= Pennsylvania Route 477 =

State highway in Pennsylvania, US

Pennsylvania Route 477

Route information
- Maintained by PennDOT
- Length: 17.681 mi (28.455 km)

Major junctions
- South end: PA 192 in Miles Township
- PA 880 in Loganton; I-80 near Loganton; Future I-99 / US 220 near Mill Hall
- North end: PA 64 near Mill Hall

Location
- Country: United States
- State: Pennsylvania
- Counties: Centre, Clinton

Highway system
- Pennsylvania State Route System; Interstate; US; State; Scenic; Legislative
← PA 476	→ PA 478

Pennsylvania Route 477 (PA 477) is a 17.7-mile-long (28.5 km) state highway located in Centre and Clinton counties in Pennsylvania. The southern terminus is at PA 192 in Miles Township. The northern terminus is at PA 64 near Mill Hall.

== Route description ==
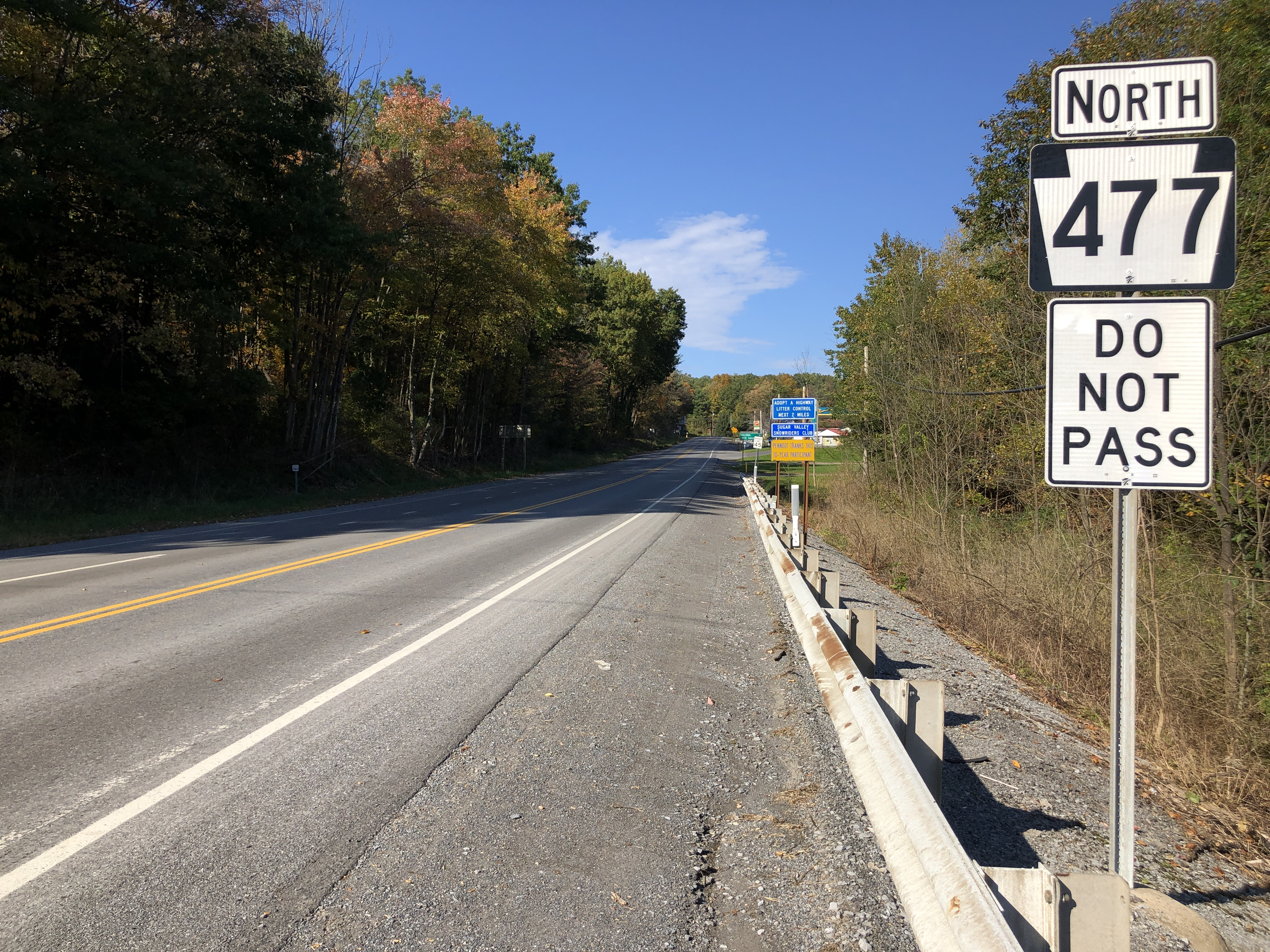
PA 477 northbound past I-80 in Greene Township

PA 477 begins at an intersection with PA 192 in the community of Livonia in Miles Township, Centre County, heading north on two-lane undivided Apple Ridge Road. The road heads across Nittany Mountain in the Bald Eagle State Forest, turning to the west before heading northwest. The route heads into Greene Township in Clinton County and heads north on Bull Run Road, leaving the state forest and heading through more wooded areas with some fields. PA 477 turns east onto West Winter Road and heads through agricultural areas in the Sugar Valley. The route turns north onto South Mill Street and passes through more rural areas before entering the borough of Loganton. Here, the road passes homes and crosses PA 880, becoming North Mill Street. PA 477 heads back into Greene Township and passes through a gap in forested Sugar Valley Mountain. The road reaches an interchange with I-80 and passes a few businesses, turning west onto Long Run Road and heading through Rosecrans.

The route runs west-northwest through farmland with occasional residences before heading into another section of the Bald Eagle State Forest. PA 477 heads into Lamar Township and runs a short distance to the north of I-80. The road turns northwest and heads away from the interstate as it passes through wooded residential areas and runs through Rote. Following this, the route winds west through farmland and woodland with some homes. The road passes through the residential community of Salona before crossing Fishing Creek and reaching an interchange with the US 220 freeway. A short distance later, PA 477 ends at an intersection with PA 64.

== Major intersections ==
County	Location	mi	km	Destinations	Notes
Centre	Miles Township	0.0	0.0	PA 192 (Brush Valley Road) – Lewisburg, Centre Hall	Southern terminus
Clinton	Loganton	6.0	9.7	PA 880 (Main Street) – Jersey Shore, Rebersburg	
Clinton	Greene Township	7.2	11.6	I-80 – Williamsport, Bellefonte	Exit 185 on I-80
Clinton	Lamar Township	17.5	28.2	Future I-99 / US 220 to I-80 – Lock Haven, State College	Exit 107 on US 220
Clinton	Lamar Township	17.6	28.3	PA 64 (Fernberg Road) – Lock Haven, Lamar, State College	Northern terminus
1.000 mi = 1.609 km; 1.000 km = 0.621 mi
