= Pennsylvania Route 880 =

State highway in Pennsylvania, US

Pennsylvania Route 880

Route information
- Maintained by PennDOT
- Length: 24.957 mi (40.164 km)

Major junctions
- South end: PA 192 in Miles Township
- PA 477 / I-80 in Loganton
- North end: PA 44 in Limestone Township

Location
- Country: United States
- State: Pennsylvania
- Counties: Centre, Clinton, Lycoming

Highway system
- Pennsylvania State Route System; Interstate; US; State; Scenic; Legislative
← PA 879	→ PA 881

Pennsylvania Route 880 (PA 880) is a 25-mile-long (40 km) state highway located in Centre, Clinton, and Lycoming counties in Pennsylvania. The southern terminus is at PA 192 in Miles Township. The northern terminus is at PA 44 in Limestone Township Though it does not have a direct junction with Interstate 80 (I-80), it underpasses the highway in Carroll and drivers can enter I-80 one mile (1.6 km) east by turning left onto East Valley Road. South of this intersection, PA 880 is known as East Valley Road until Loganton, where it becomes Main Street. South of Loganton it continues as West Valley Road until the Centre County line. From there until its southern terminus it serves as Broad Street in Rebersburg. North of the East Valley Road intersection, PA 880 becomes Rauchtown Road until entering Lycoming County.

== Route description ==
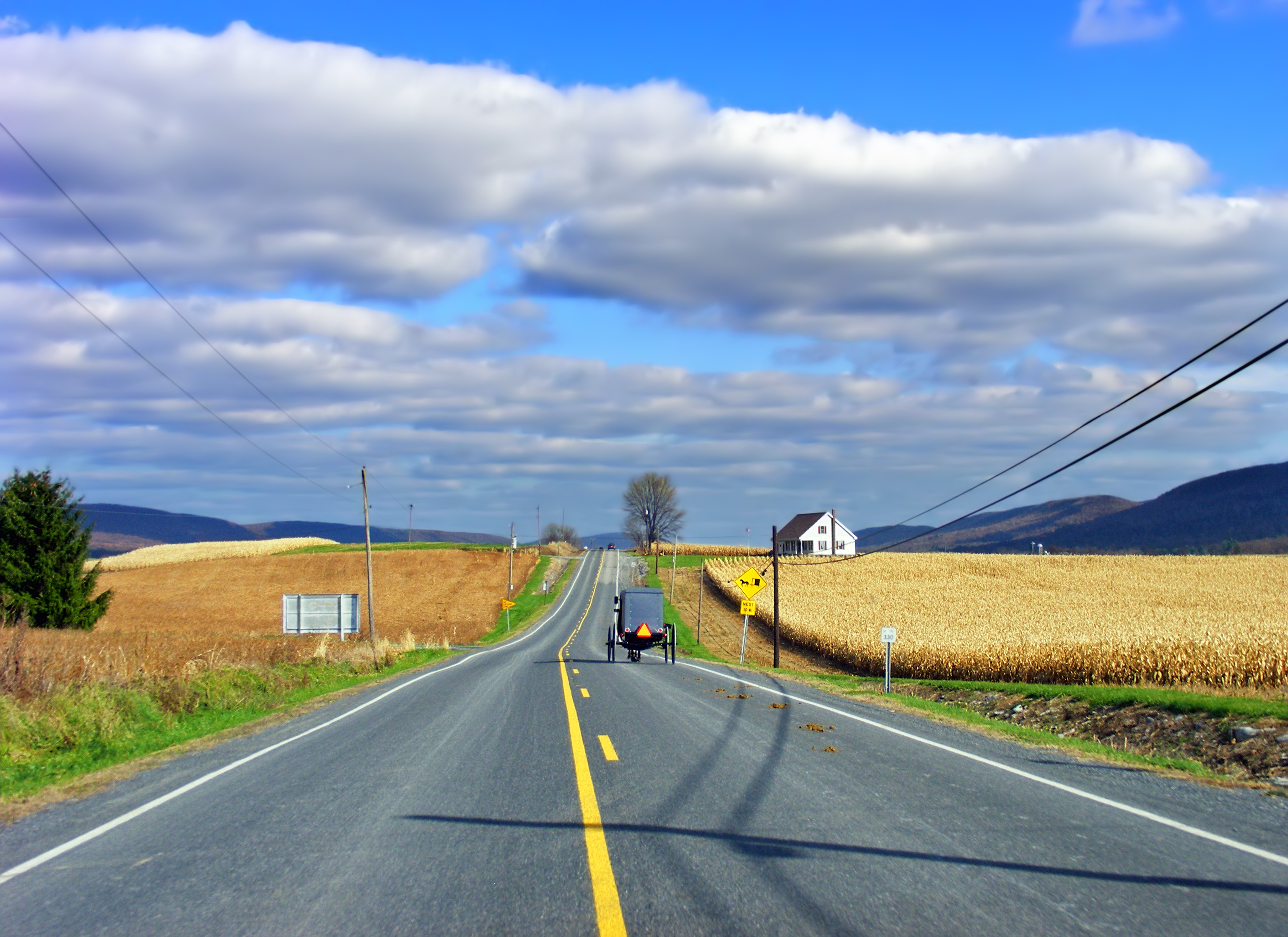
PA 880 in Logan Township

PA 880 begins at an intersection with PA 192 in the community of Rebersburg in Miles Township, Centre County, heading north on two-lane undivided Broad Street. The road heads through agricultural areas with some homes in the Brush Valley before turning northeast and crossing forested Nittany Mountain.

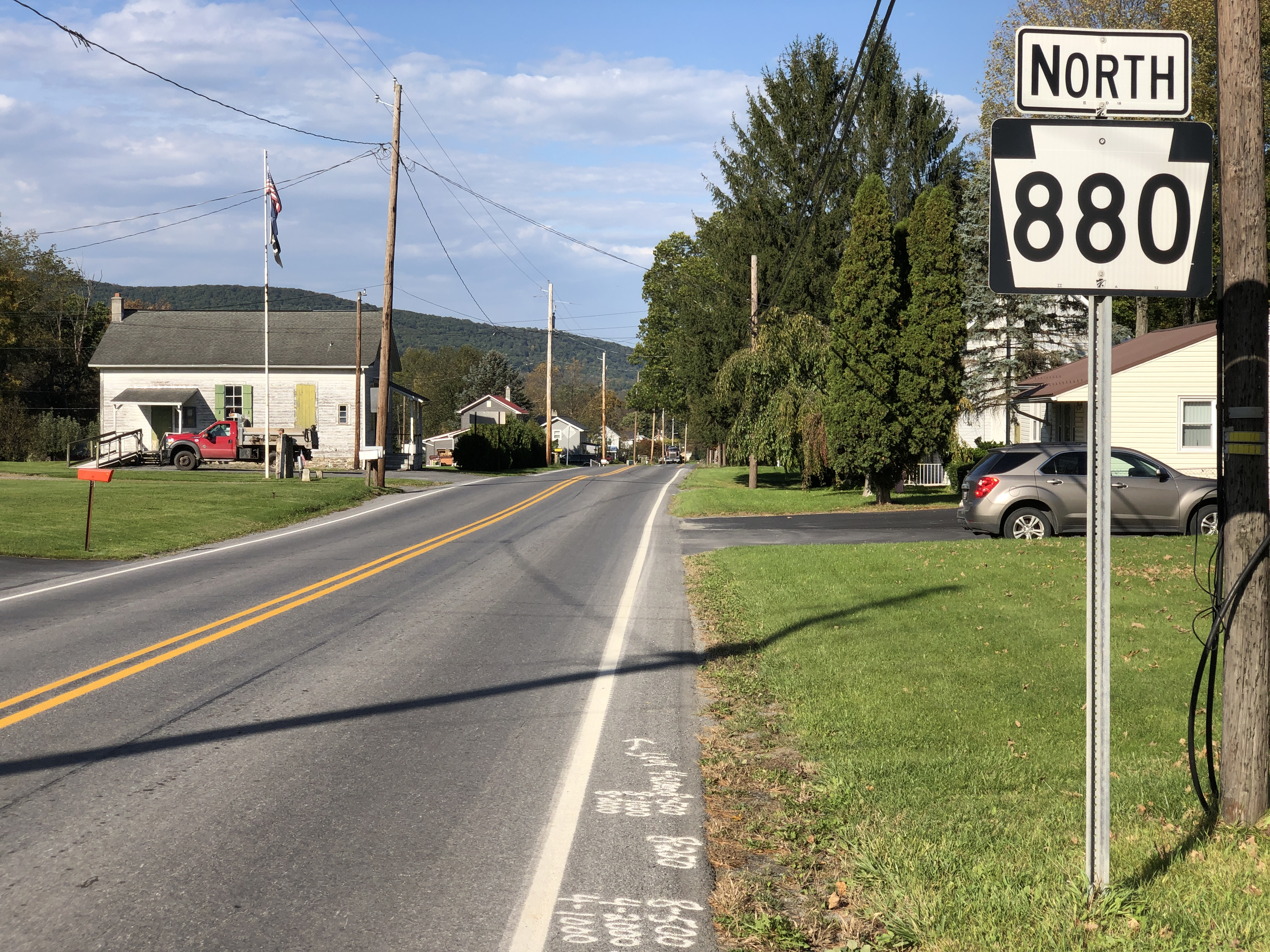
PA 880 northbound in Crawford Township

At the top of the mountain, PA 880 enters Logan Township in Clinton County and becomes West Valley Road, turning north to descend the mountain. The route heads into the agricultural Sugar Valley and turns east in Tylersville, soon curving to the northeast. The road continues east-northeast through more farmland with some trees and homes, passing through Booneville and heading into Greene Township. Farther east, PA 880 crosses into the borough of Loganton and becomes West Main Street, passing homes. In the center of town, the route crosses PA 477 and becomes East Main Street, running through more residential areas. The road crosses back into Greene Township and becomes East Valley Road, continuing through more agricultural areas with some woods and homes a short distance to the south of forested Sugar Valley Mountain. In Carroll, PA 880 turns north onto Rauchtown Road, with East Valley Road continuing east to an interchange with I-80. The route heads through wooded areas with some residences, crossing a gap in Sugar Valley Mountain. At this point, the road passes under the eastbound lanes of I-80, running within the wide median of the interstate for a distance before passing under the westbound lanes. After this, PA 880 passes a few fields as it turns northwest, crossing into the Tiadaghton State Forest and heading into Crawford Township. The route turns to the north and runs through more of the state forest before passing through Big Rock and running near Ravensburg State Park. Farther north, the road leaves the state forest and passes through residential Rauchtown, heading through more wooded areas.

PA 880 crosses into Limestone Township in Lycoming County and becomes an unnamed road, heading north-northwest into agricultural areas before turning northeast. The route passes through more farmland with some woods and development before ending at PA 44.

== Major intersections ==
County	Location	mi	km	Destinations	Notes
Centre	Miles Township	0.000	0.000	PA 192 (Brush Valley Road) – Lewisburg, Centre Hall	Southern terminus
Clinton	Loganton	10.756	17.310	PA 477 (Mill Street) to I-80 – Salona, Livonia	
Lycoming	Limestone Township	24.957	40.164	PA 44 – Jersey Shore	Northern terminus
1.000 mi = 1.609 km; 1.000 km = 0.621 mi
