= Pennsylvania Route 445 =

State highway in Centre County, Pennsylvania, US

Pennsylvania Route 445

Route information
- Maintained by PennDOT
- Length: 11.998 mi (19.309 km)
- Existed: 1928–present

Major junctions
- South end: PA 45 in Millheim
- PA 192 near Millheim
- North end: PA 64 in Nittany

Location
- Country: United States
- State: Pennsylvania
- Counties: Centre

Highway system
- Pennsylvania State Route System; Interstate; US; State; Scenic; Legislative
← PA 443	→ PA 446

Pennsylvania Route 445 (PA 445) is a 12-mile-long (19 km) state highway located in Centre County, Pennsylvania. The southern terminus is at PA 45 in Millheim. The northern terminus is at PA 64 in Nittany.

== Route description ==
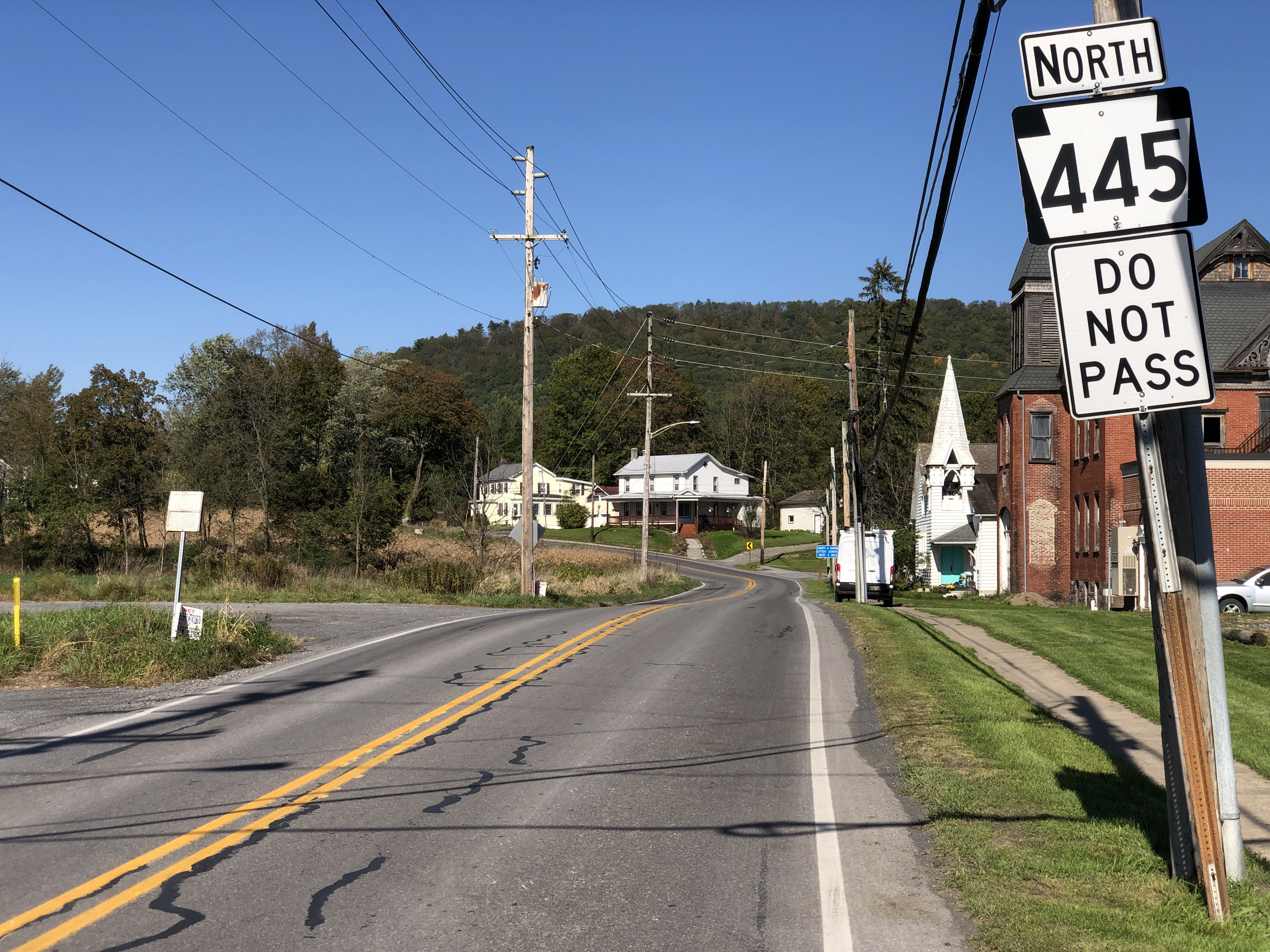
PA 445 northbound in Millheim

PA 445 begins at an intersection with PA 45 in the borough of Millheim in the Penns Valley, heading north on two-lane undivided North Street. The road heads through residential areas with some farms, running to the west of Elk Creek. The route crosses into Penn Township and becomes an unnamed road, heading north across forested Brush Mountain. PA 445 enters Miles Township and continues into the agricultural Brush Valley, passing through Spring Bank and reaching an intersection with PA 192. At this point, the route turns west to form a concurrency with PA 192 on Brush Valley Road, passing more farms. PA 445 splits from PA 192 by heading north on Madisonburg Park through the residential community of Madisonburg. The route heads north across forested Nittany Mountain, becoming Madisonburg Pike Road. The road ascends the mountain by making a sharp turn to the west, a hairpin turn to the northeast, and a hairpin turn to the west. The route turns north and crosses into Walker Township. PA 445 becomes Gingerick Gap Road and winds north across more of the mountain. After crossing Nittany Mountain, the route turns northwest and passes through a mix of farms, woods, and homes before ending at PA 64 in Nittany.

== Major intersections ==
The entire route is in Centre County.

Location	mi	km	Destinations	Notes
Millheim	0.000	0.000	PA 45 (Main Street) – Boalsburg, Lewisburg	Southern terminus
Miles Township	3.091	4.974	PA 192 east (Brush Valley Road) – Rebersburg	Southern end of PA 192 concurrency
Miles Township	4.596	7.397	PA 192 west (Brush Valley Road) – Centre Hall	Northern end of PA 192 concurrency
Walker Township	11.998	19.309	PA 64 (Nittany Valley Drive) – Bellefonte, State College, Lock Haven	Northern terminus
1.000 mi = 1.609 km; 1.000 km = 0.621 mi: Concurrency terminus
