= Clintondale, Pennsylvania =

Unincorporated community in Pennsylvania, US

- Census-designated place
- Location within Pennsylvania Location within the United States
- Coordinates: 41°1′3″N 77°31′7″W
- Country: United States
- State: Pennsylvania
- County: Clinton
- Township: Porter

Area
  - Total: 0.40 sq mi (1.03 km^{2})
  - Land: 0.39 sq mi (1.00 km^{2})
  - Water: 0.015 sq mi (0.04 km^{2})
- Elevation: 769 ft (234 m)

Population (2020)
  - Total: 110
  - Density: 286.3/sq mi (110.54/km^{2})
- Time zone: UTC-5 (Eastern (EST))
  - Summer (DST): UTC-4 (EDT)
- ZIP Code: 17751 (Mill Hall)
- Area codes: 570/272
- FIPS code: 42-14368
- GNIS feature ID: 2805476

Clintondale is an unincorporated community and census-designated place (CDP) in Clinton County, Pennsylvania, United States. It was first listed as a CDP prior to the 2020 census.

The CDP is in southern Clinton County, in the west-central part of Porter Township. It is bordered to the southwest by Fishing Creek, across which is the CDP of Lamar. Fishing Creek is a northeast-flowing tributary of Bald Eagle Creek, part of the West Branch Susquehanna River watershed.

Pennsylvania Route 64 forms the northwest boundary of Clintondale; it leads northeast 6 miles (10 km) to Mill Hall and southwest 26 miles (42 km) to State College. Interstate 80 passes just north of Clintondale, with access from Exit 173 (PA 64). I-80 leads east 38 miles (61 km) to the Milton area and west 56 miles (90 km) to Clearfield.

Clintondale is in the northeast part of the Nittany Valley, with 2,100-foot (640 m) Big Mountain rising 1 mile (1.6 km) to the south and 1,680-foot (510 m) Bald Eagle Mountain 3 miles (5 km) to the north.

== Demographics ==
Historical population
Census	Pop.	Note	%±
2020	110		—
U.S. Decennial Census
