= Madisonburg, Pennsylvania =

Unincorporated community in Pennsylvania, US

- Census designated place
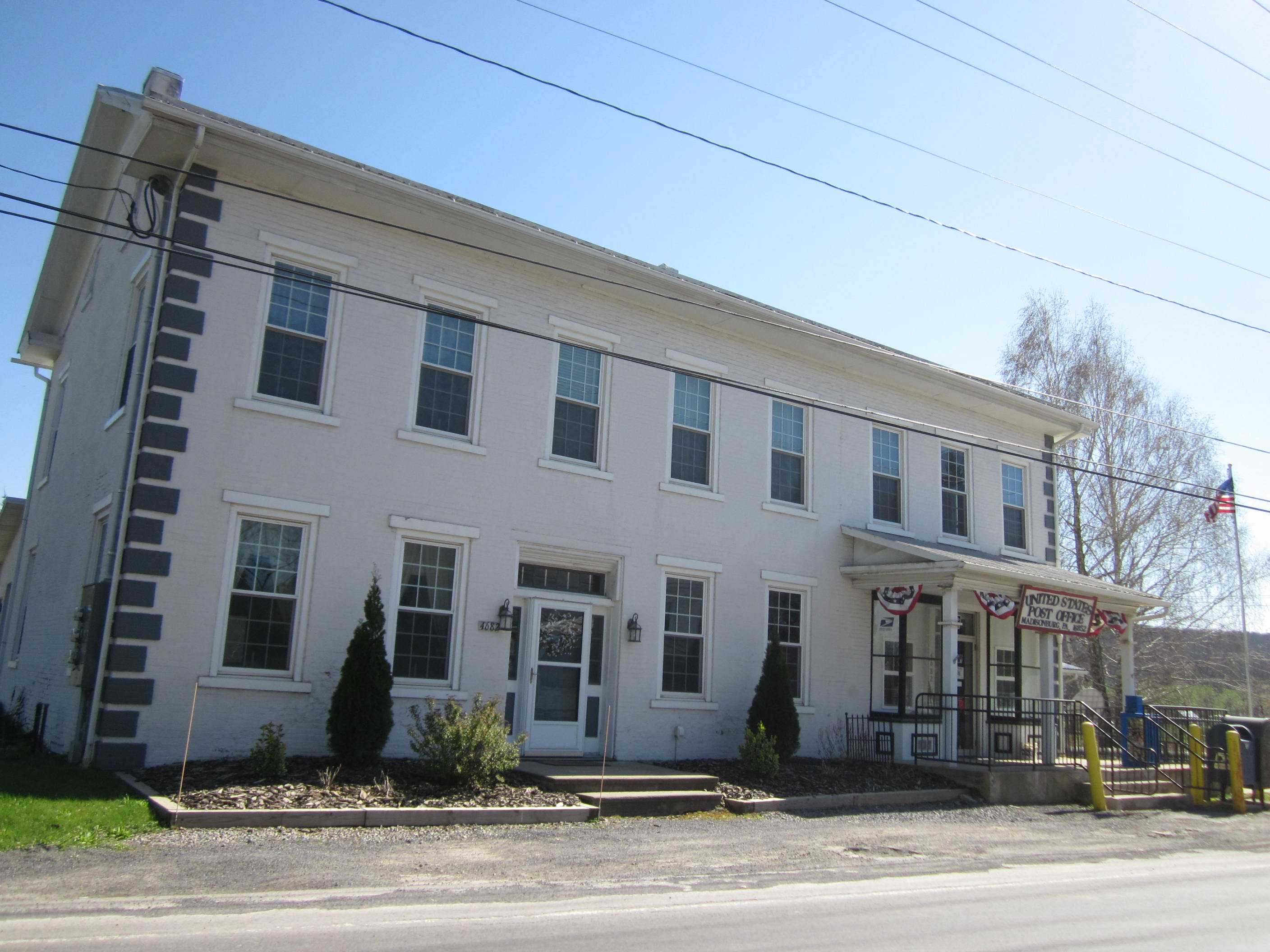
- The post office in Madisonburg

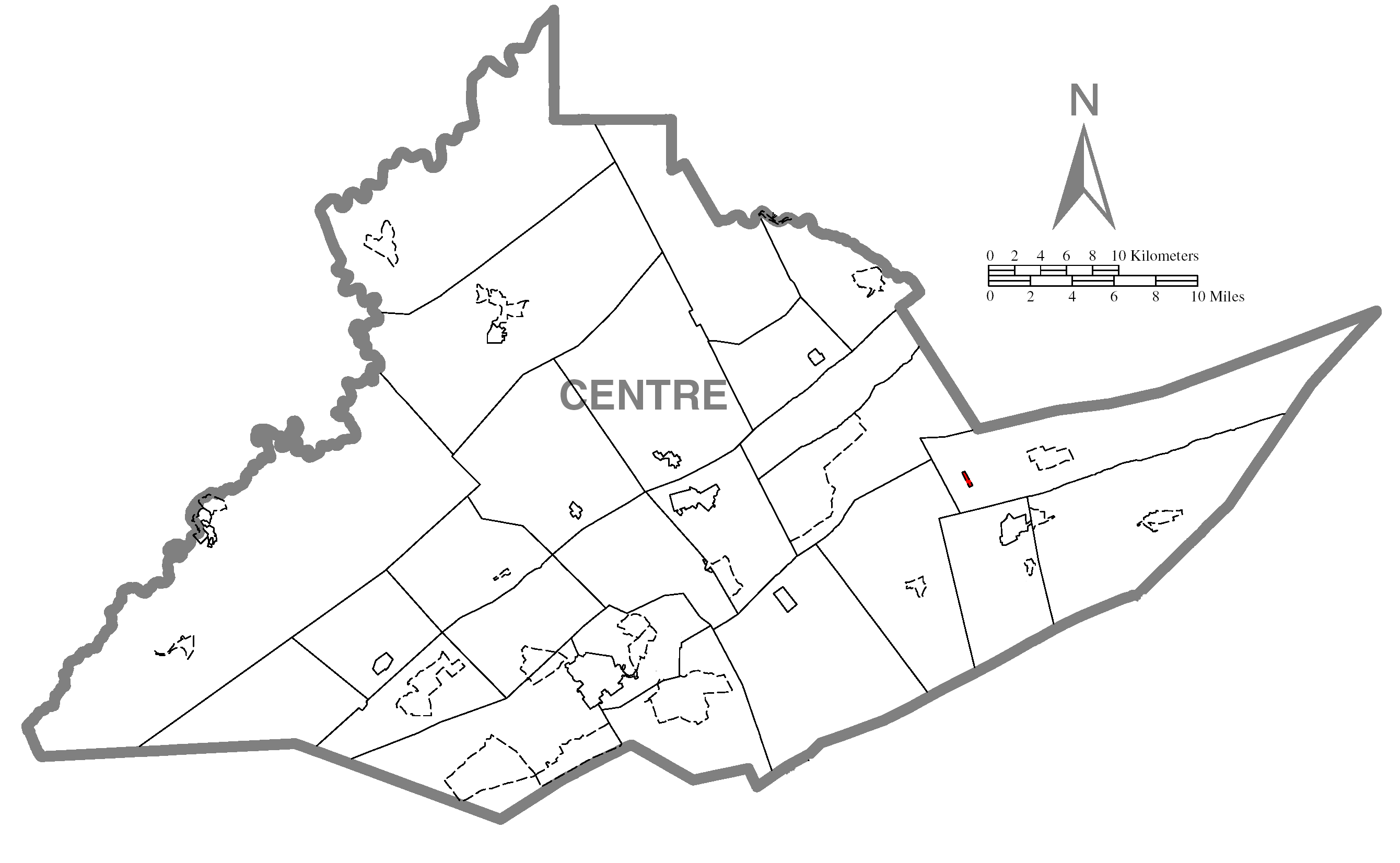
- Location within Centre County

- Location within the U.S. state of Pennsylvania Madisonburg (the United States)
- Coordinates: 40°55′37″N 77°31′2″W
- Country: United States
- State: Pennsylvania
- County: Centre
- Township: Miles

Area
  - Total: 0.22 sq mi (0.56 km^{2})
  - Land: 0.22 sq mi (0.56 km^{2})
  - Water: 0 sq mi (0.00 km^{2})
- Elevation: 1,290 ft (390 m)

Population (2020)
  - Total: 209
  - Density: 969.2/sq mi (374.22/km^{2})
- Time zone: UTC-5 (Eastern (EST))
  - Summer (DST): UTC-4 (EDT)
- ZIP code: 16852
- FIPS code: 42-46504
- GNIS feature ID: 1180186

Madisonburg is an unincorporated community and census-designated place (CDP) in Miles Township, Pennsylvania, United States. It is part of the State College, Pennsylvania Metropolitan Statistical Area. The population was 168 at the 2010 census.

== Geography ==
Madisonburg is located in eastern Centre County at 40°55′37″N 77°31′2″W (40.927049, -77.517123), in the western part of Miles Township. It is in the Brush Valley, part of the Ridge-and-Valley Province of the Appalachian Mountains. The valley lies between the parallel ridges of Nittany Mountain to the north and Brush Mountain to the south.

Pennsylvania Route 445 is the main street of the town, leading north across Nittany Mountain 7 miles (11 km) to Pennsylvania Route 64 in Nittany, which itself is 3 miles (5 km) southwest of Interstate 80. PA 445 intersects PA 192 at the southern end of Madisonburg; PA 192 leads east 4 miles (6 km) to Rebersburg and southwest 10 miles (16 km) to Centre Hall, while PA 445 follows PA 192 east for a short distance, then leads south through Brush Mountain and Shriner Mountain 4 miles (6 km) to Millheim.

According to the United States Census Bureau, Madisonburg has a total area of 0.08 square miles (0.20 km^{2}), all land.

== Demographics ==
Historical population
Census	Pop.	Note	%±
2020	209		—
U.S. Decennial Census

As of the census of 2000, there were 135 people, 53 households, and 41 families residing in the CDP. The population density was 1,085.2 people per square mile (419.0 people/km^{2}). There were 56 housing units at an average density of 450.2 per square mile (173.8/km^{2}). The racial makeup of the CDP was 100.00% White.

There were 53 households, out of which 32.1% had children under the age of 18 living with them, 66.0% were married couples living together, 11.3% had a female householder with no husband present, and 22.6% were non-families. 17.0% of all households were made up of individuals, and 7.5% had someone living alone who was 65 years of age or older. The average household size was 2.55 and the average family size was 2.90.

In the CDP, the population was spread out, with 25.9% under the age of 18, 4.4% from 18 to 24, 28.1% from 25 to 44, 23.0% from 45 to 64, and 18.5% who were 65 years of age or older. The median age was 40 years. For every 100 females, there were 82.4 males. For every 100 females age 18 and over, there were 85.2 males.

The median income for a household in the CDP was $37,750, and the median income for a family was $39,750. Males had a median income of $30,313 versus $18,750 for females. The per capita income for the CDP was $16,231. There were no families and 2.4% of the population living below the poverty line, including no under eighteens and 12.0% of those over 64.
