= Pennsylvania Route 192 =

State highway in Pennsylvania, US

Pennsylvania Route 192

Route information
- Maintained by PennDOT
- Length: 45.4 mi (73.1 km)

Major junctions
- West end: PA 144 in Centre Hall
- PA 445 in Madisonburg; PA 880 in Rebersburg; PA 477 in Livonia
- East end: US 15 in Lewisburg

Location
- Country: United States
- State: Pennsylvania
- Counties: Centre, Union

Highway system
- Pennsylvania State Route System; Interstate; US; State; Scenic; Legislative
← PA 191	→ PA 193
← I-95	PA 95	→ PA 96

Pennsylvania Route 192 (PA 192) is a state highway located in central Pennsylvania. The western terminus of the route is at PA 144 in Centre Hall. The eastern terminus is at U.S. Route 15 (US 15) in Lewisburg.

== Route description ==
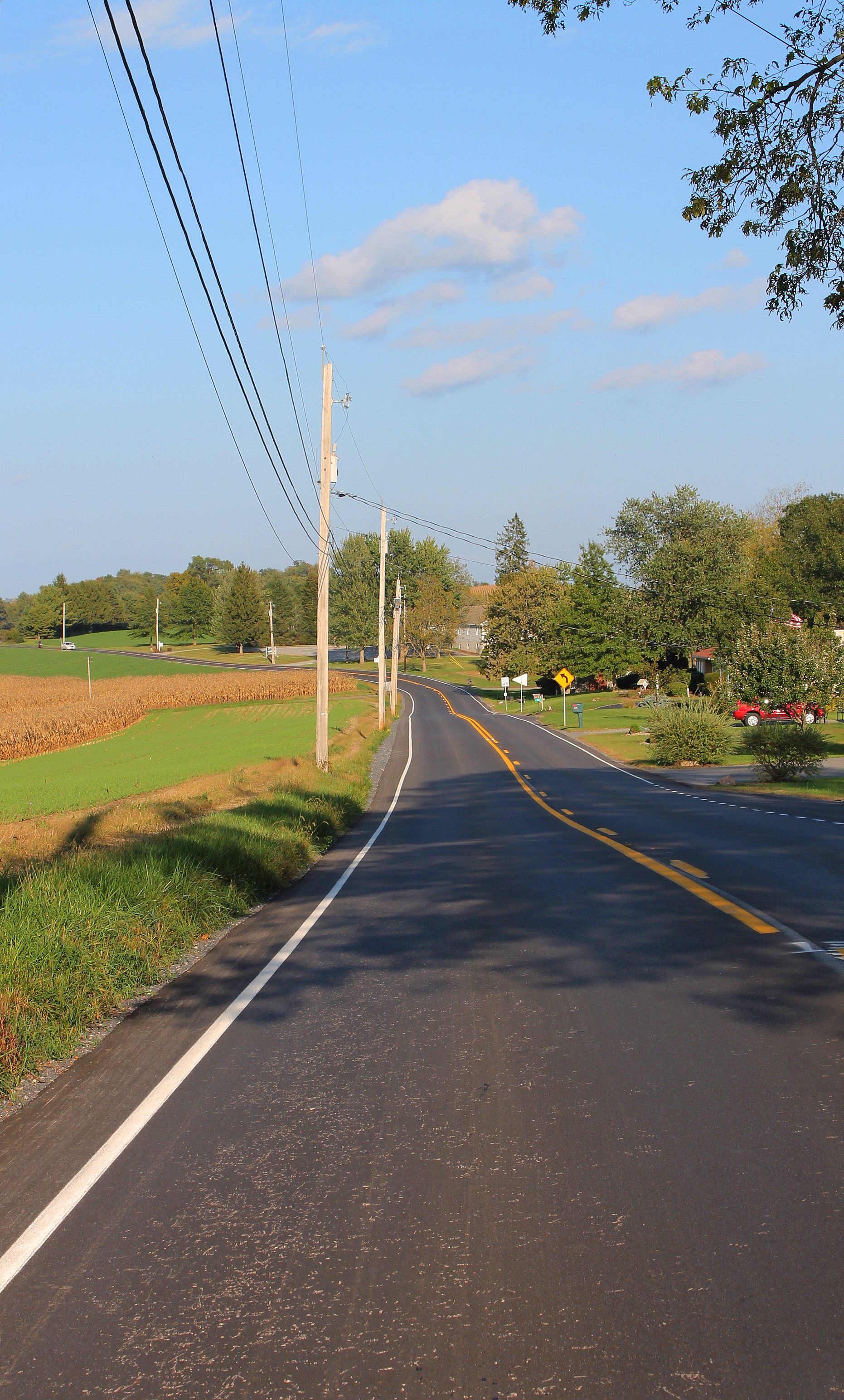
PA 192 east

PA 192 begins at an intersection with PA 144 in the borough of Centre Hall in Centre County, heading northeast on two-lane undivided East Church Street. The road passes homes before crossing into Potter Township, where it becomes Upper Brush Valley Road and heads into agricultural areas with some residences located in the Brush Valley to the southeast of forested Nittany Mountain. The route passes through more rural areas as it enters Gregg Township, where the name changes to Brush Valley Road. PA 192 runs through more farmland with occasional trees, passing to the north of Penn's Cave and Hotel and Penns Cave Airport. The road continues east-northeast through the agricultural Brush Valley bounded by Nittany Mountain to the north and Brush Mountain to the south as it heads into Miles Township and reaches an intersection with PA 445 in the community of Madisonburg. At this point, PA 445 turns east to form a concurrency with PA 192, passing more farms. PA 445 splits to the south and PA 192 runs through more open agricultural areas with some homes, passing through Rockville before heading into the residential community of Rebersburg and becoming Main Street. In this community, the route intersects PA 880. Upon leaving Rebersburg, the road becomes Brush Valley Road again and heads through open farmland with occasional homes, running through Wolfs Store. Farther east, PA 192 heads into forested areas and comes to a junction with PA 477 in Livonia. After this intersection, the route heads into the Bald Eagle State Forest.

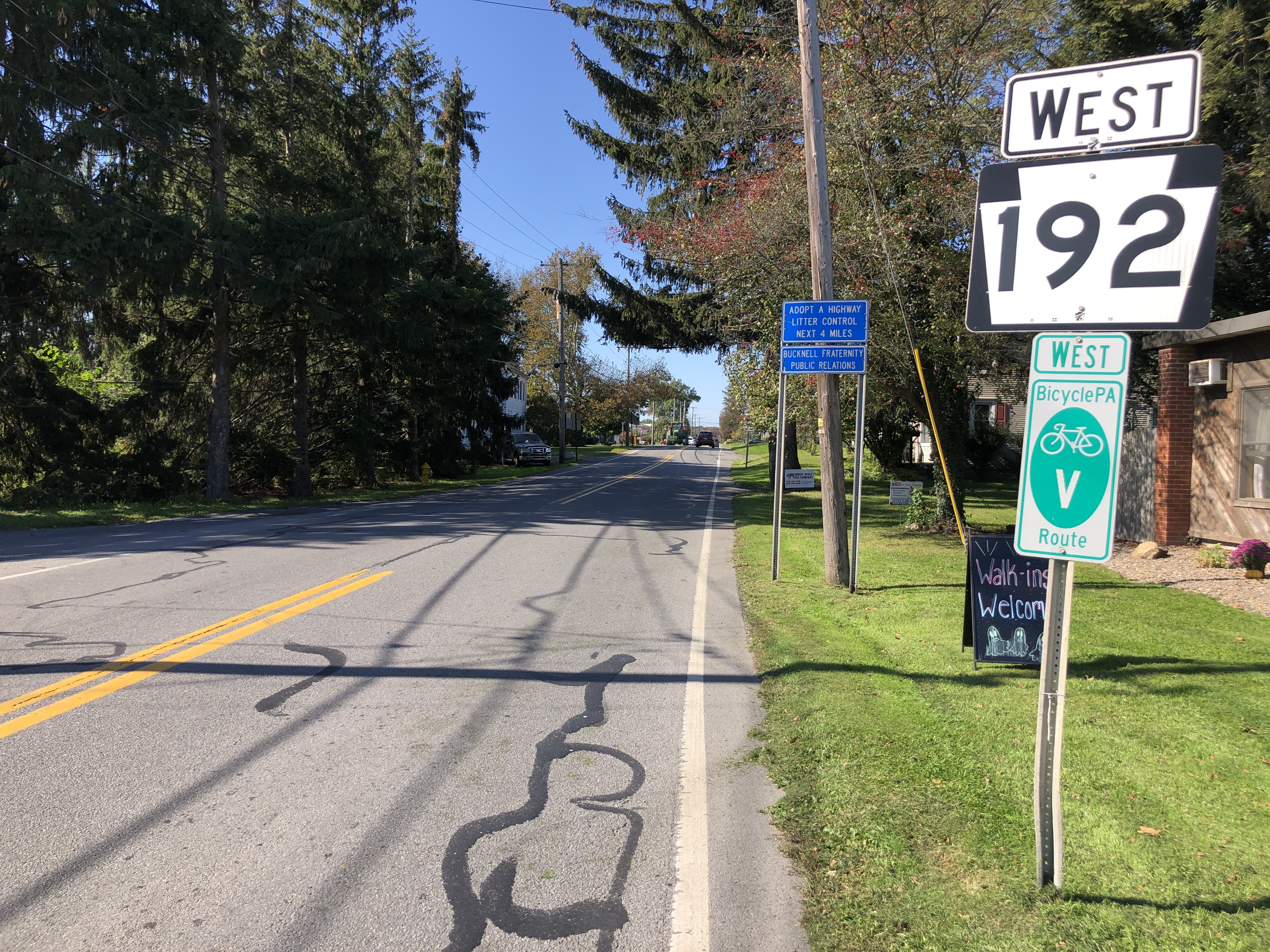
PA 192 westbound past US 15 in Lewisburg

PA 192 enters Hartley Township in Union County and becomes Buffalo Road, heading into R. B. Winter State Park and curving southeast. The road heads through more of the Bald Eagle State Forest and turns east again, passing between Naked Mountain to the north and Seven Notch Mountain to the south and heading into Lewis Township. Here, the route passes Sand Bridge State Park before leaving the state forest, at which point it runs through more forests and crosses into West Buffalo Township, passing to the north of Jones Mountain. PA 192 curves to the southeast near some wooded residential areas and heads into a mix of fields and woods with occasional homes, passing through Forest Hill and Tannertown. The road heads into Buffalo Township and passes through Cowan, at which point it crosses Buffalo Creek and turns east into open agricultural areas with a few homes. The route passes through Buffalo Cross Roads and continues through more rural areas with occasional residential and commercial development. Farther east, PA 192 becomes the border between Buffalo Township to the north and the borough of Lewisburg to the south, passing through residential areas with a few businesses. The route fully enters Lewisburg and passes more homes before ending at US 15.

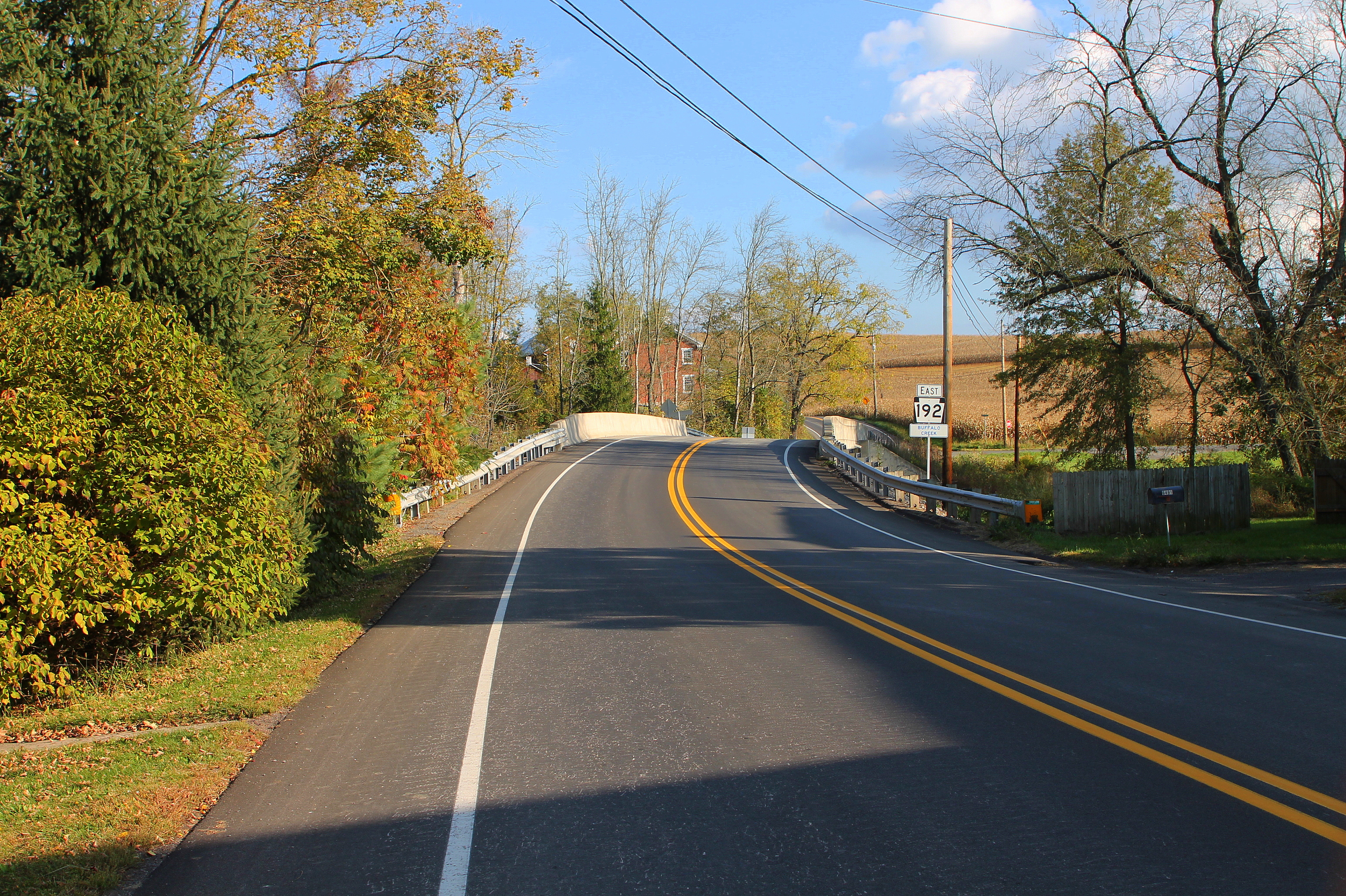
PA 192 near Cowan

== History ==
Until 1961, PA 192 was designated Pennsylvania Route 95 along its entire length. Its name was likely changed to avoid confusion with Interstate 95 in Philadelphia.

== Major intersections ==
County	Location	mi	km	Destinations	Notes
Centre	Centre Hall	0.0	0.0	PA 144 (Pennsylvania Avenue) – State College, Lewistown, Bellefonte	Western terminus of PA 192
Centre	Miles Township	10.5	16.9	PA 445 north (Madisonburg Mountain Road) – Lamar	West end of PA 445 concurrency
Centre	Miles Township	12.0	19.3	PA 445 south – Millheim	East end of PA 445 concurrency
Centre	Miles Township	14.4	23.2	PA 880 east (Broad Street) – Loganton	Western terminus of PA 880
Centre	Miles Township	22.7	36.5	PA 477 north – Loganton	Southern terminus of PA 477
Union	Lewisburg	45.4	73.1	US 15 (Derr Drive) – Williamsport, Selinsgrove	Eastern terminus of PA 192
1.000 mi = 1.609 km; 1.000 km = 0.621 mi: Concurrency terminus
