= Henry Meyer (poet) =

American politician and poet (1840–1925)

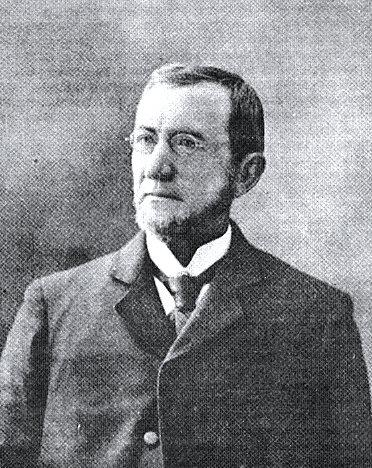
Meyer in 1904

Henry Meyer (December 5, 1840 – November 8, 1925) was a poet originally from Brush Valley, (Centre County), Pennsylvania, and a politician serving in the Pennsylvania House of Representatives. His native language was Pennsylvania Dutch, and although he learned English in school, he wrote his poetry in "Dutch".

His original career was as a wheelwright, but he lost an arm near Spottsylvania during the American Civil War. (He was a corporal in the Centre County Regiment, the 148th Pennsylvania Infantry.) In the war he began the diary he would keep the rest of his life, and after the war spent time as a teacher, county superintendent, state representative and justice of the peace during the 58 years he was in Rebersburg. He was a teacher of the poet Calvin Ziegler and was active in community organizations. While Meyer's collected poems have apparently yet to be published together, at least one ("For Was Er So Freundlich Is") was published in The Millheim Journal of 14 August 1907.

== Sources ==
- Macneal, Douglas. A Penns Creek Companion. Aaronsburg, Pennsylvania: Penns Valley Conservation Association, 2005. ISBN 0-9771697-0-7
