= Rote, Pennsylvania =

Unincorporated community in Pennsylvania, US

- Census-designated place
- Location in Clinton County and the state of Pennsylvania.
- Coordinates: 41°04′44″N 77°25′12″W
- Country: United States
- State: Pennsylvania
- County: Clinton
- Township: Lamar

Area
  - Total: 1.1 sq mi (2.8 km^{2})
  - Land: 1.1 sq mi (2.8 km^{2})
  - Water: 0 sq mi (0.0 km^{2})
- Elevation: 755 ft (230 m)

Population (2010)
  - Total: 507
  - Density: 466/sq mi (179.9/km^{2})
- Time zone: UTC-5 (Eastern (EST))
  - Summer (DST): UTC-4 (EDT)
- ZIP code: 17751
- FIPS code: 42-66384
- GNIS feature ID: 2630037

Rote is a census-designated place located in Lamar Township in southern Clinton County, Pennsylvania, United States. As of the 2010 census, the population was 507.

Rote is located near the center of Lamar Township in southern Clinton County, along Pennsylvania Route 477 near the northeastern end of the Nittany Valley. PA 477 leads west 3 miles (5 km) to U.S. Route 220 at Cedar Springs, and east 7 miles (11 km) to Exit 185 on Interstate 80 near Loganton. Exit 178 on I-80 is 2.5 miles (4.0 km) southwest of Rote, via a local road and US 220.
