= Pennsylvania Route 64 =

State highway in Pennsylvania, US

Pennsylvania Route 64

Route information
- Maintained by PennDOT
- Length: 21.3 mi (34.3 km)
- Existed: 1934–present

Major junctions
- South end: PA 26 in Spring Township
- PA 550 in Zion: PA 445 in Nittany; I-80 / Future I-99 / US 220 in Porter Township; PA 477 near Salona
- North end: PA 150 in Mill Hall

Location
- Country: United States
- State: Pennsylvania
- Counties: Centre, Clinton

Highway system
- Pennsylvania State Route System; Interstate; US; State; Scenic; Legislative
| ← PA 63 | → PA 65 |

Pennsylvania Route 64 (PA 64) is a 21.3-mile-long (34.3 km) north–south state route located in central Pennsylvania. At its southern terminus in Spring Township, PA 64 continues north from where Pennsylvania Route 26 turns to join Interstate 99 and U.S. Route 220. The northern terminus is at Pennsylvania Route 150 in Mill Hall. During its run, PA 64 carries the names Nittany Valley Drive and Water Street.

== Route description ==
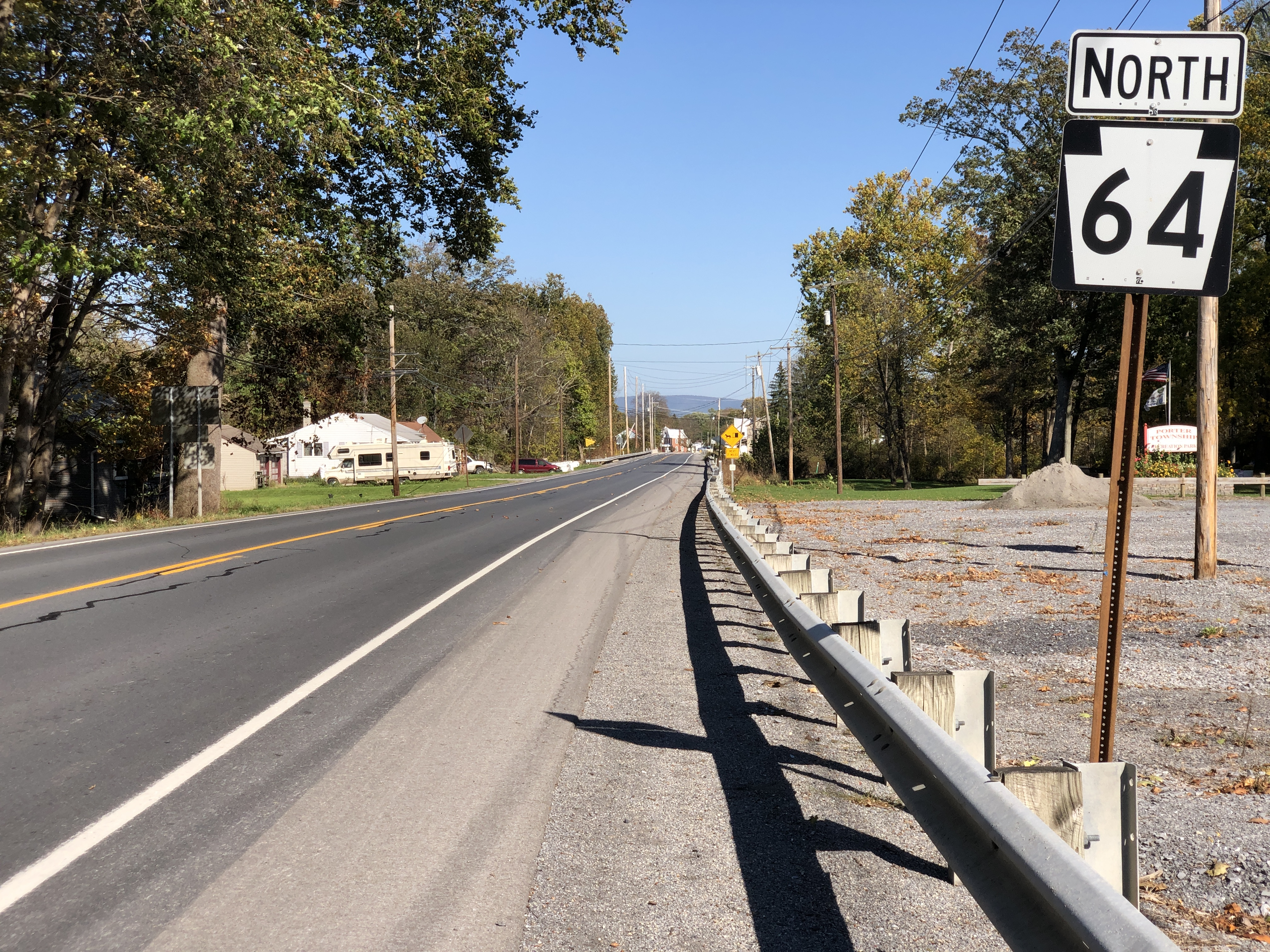
PA 64 northbound in Porter Township

PA 64 begins at an intersection with PA 26 in Spring Township, Centre County at the point PA 26 turns north onto a freeway. From here, the route heads northeast on two-lane undivided East College Avenue, heading through farmland with a few quarries. The road heads through more open agricultural areas with some housing developments as it crosses into Walker Township and intersects the northern terminus of PA 550. At this point, PA 64 becomes Nittany Valley Drive and heads through more farmland and homes. Farther northeast, the route passes through Hublersburg and runs through more rural areas. The road heads through farmland with some woods and homes as it reaches a junction with the northern terminus of PA 445 in the residential community of Nittany.

PA 64 enters Porter Township in Clinton County and runs through more rural residential areas, crossing Fishing Creek before passing through Lamar. After this, the road crosses the creek again and heads into agricultural areas before gaining a center left-turn lane as it interchanges with I-80/US 220 in a commercial area. Following this interchange, the route becomes a two-lane road again and runs through more open farmland with a few homes. PA 64 heads into Lamar Township and heads north-northeast. The road continues into wooded areas with some development, heading north onto Fernberg Road at Cedar Springs. The route intersects PA 477 and heads through a gap in forested Bald Eagle Mountain along with Fishing Creek and the US 220 freeway to the east, crossing into the borough of Mill Hall. PA 64 turns northwest and becomes South Water Street, passing between homes to the west and the Fishing Creek to the east. The road turns north and passes businesses along North Water Street, crossing a Nittany and Bald Eagle Railroad line. The route passes more residential and commercial establishments before ending at PA 150.

== Major intersections ==
| County | Location | mi | km | Destinations | Notes |
|---|---|---|---|---|---|
| Centre | Spring Township | 0.0 | 0.0 | PA 26 (College Avenue) to I-99 / US 220 – Pleasant Gap, State College | Southern terminus |
| Centre | Walker Township | 3.6 | 5.8 | PA 550 south (Zion Road) – Bellefonte | Northern terminus of PA 550 |
| Centre | Walker Township | 12.4 | 20.0 | PA 445 south (Madisonburg Mountain Road) – Millheim | Northern terminus of PA 445 |
| Clinton | Porter Township | 15.2 | 24.5 | I-80 / Future I-99 / US 220 – Williamsport, Bellefonte | Exit 173 on I-80 |
| Clinton | Lamar Township | 19.9 | 32.0 | PA 477 south (Long Run Road) – Salona, Loganton | Northern terminus of PA 477 |
| Clinton | Mill Hall | 21.3 | 34.3 | PA 150 (Hogan Boulevard) – Milesburg, Lock Haven | Northern terminus |
1.000 mi = 1.609 km; 1.000 km = 0.621 mi

== PA 64 Truck ==
Pennsylvania Route 64 Truck
- Location: Lamar, Pennsylvania
- Existed: 2013–2019

Pennsylvania Route 64 Truck was a truck route around a weight-restricted bridge over the Big Fishing Creek near Lamar, Pennsylvania. The route followed PA 26 and I-80. The route was signed in 2013; six years later, a new bridge was constructed, and the truck route was removed.
