= Snydertown, Centre County, Pennsylvania =

Unincorporated community in Pennsylvania, US

Snydertown (Centre County), Pennsylvania
- Census-designated place
- Map showing Centre County in Pennsylvania

- Location in Pennsylvania Snydertown (the United States)
- Coordinates: 40°59′2″N 77°35′10″W
- Country: United States
- State: Pennsylvania
- County: Centre
- Townships: Walker, Marion

Area
  - Total: 3.05 sq mi (7.91 km^{2})
  - Land: 3.05 sq mi (7.91 km^{2})
  - Water: 0 sq mi (0.0 km^{2})
- Elevation: 893 ft (272 m)

Population (2010)
  - Total: 483
  - Density: 160/sq mi (61/km^{2})
- Time zone: UTC-5 (Eastern (EST))
  - Summer (DST): UTC-4 (EDT)
- ZIP code: 16910
- FIPS code: 42-71694
- GNIS feature ID: 1187972

Snydertown is an unincorporated community and census-designated place in Walker and Marion townships in Centre County, Pennsylvania, United States. As of the 2010 census, the population was 483.

The village center lies in Walker Township in the Nittany Valley, between the communities of Hublersburg and Nittany near Pennsylvania Route 64. The CDP boundaries extend west to include a residential development on the summit and slopes of Sand Ridge. Interstate 80 in Marion Township on the northwestern side of Sand Ridge forms the northwestern boundary of the CDP, although there is no direct access at this point.
