= Livonia, Pennsylvania =

Unincorporated community in Pennsylvania, US

- Unincorporated community
- Location within the state of Pennsylvania
- Coordinates: 40°58′50″N 77°17′30″W
- Country: United States
- State: Pennsylvania
- County: Centre County
- Township: Miles Township
- Settled: ~1840
- Elevation: 1,499 ft (457 m)
- Time zone: Eastern (EST)
  - Summer (DST): EDT
- ZIP code: 16872
- Area code: 570

Livonia is an unincorporated community in the Appalachian Mountains of central Pennsylvania, United States. Livonia is in Miles Township, Centre County, near the head of Brush Valley, just west of Hough Mountain and just north of Elk Creek. It is located on Railroad Creek at the intersection of Pennsylvania Routes PA 477 and PA 192. Elevation is 1,499 feet. The nearest post office is in Loganton, Pennsylvania, but mail in handled out of Rebersburg.

Nearby is Bald Eagle State Forest and White Deer Creek is known for its fly-fishing.

== History ==
Livonia was first settled in the 1840s, but the economy did not flourish until the railroad spur reached them about 1900 during a logging boom. There was a Civilian Conservation Corps camp there from 1933 to 1942.
