= Porter Township, Clinton County, Pennsylvania =

Township in Pennsylvania, US

Coordinates: 41°02′30″N 77°31′29″W

- Township
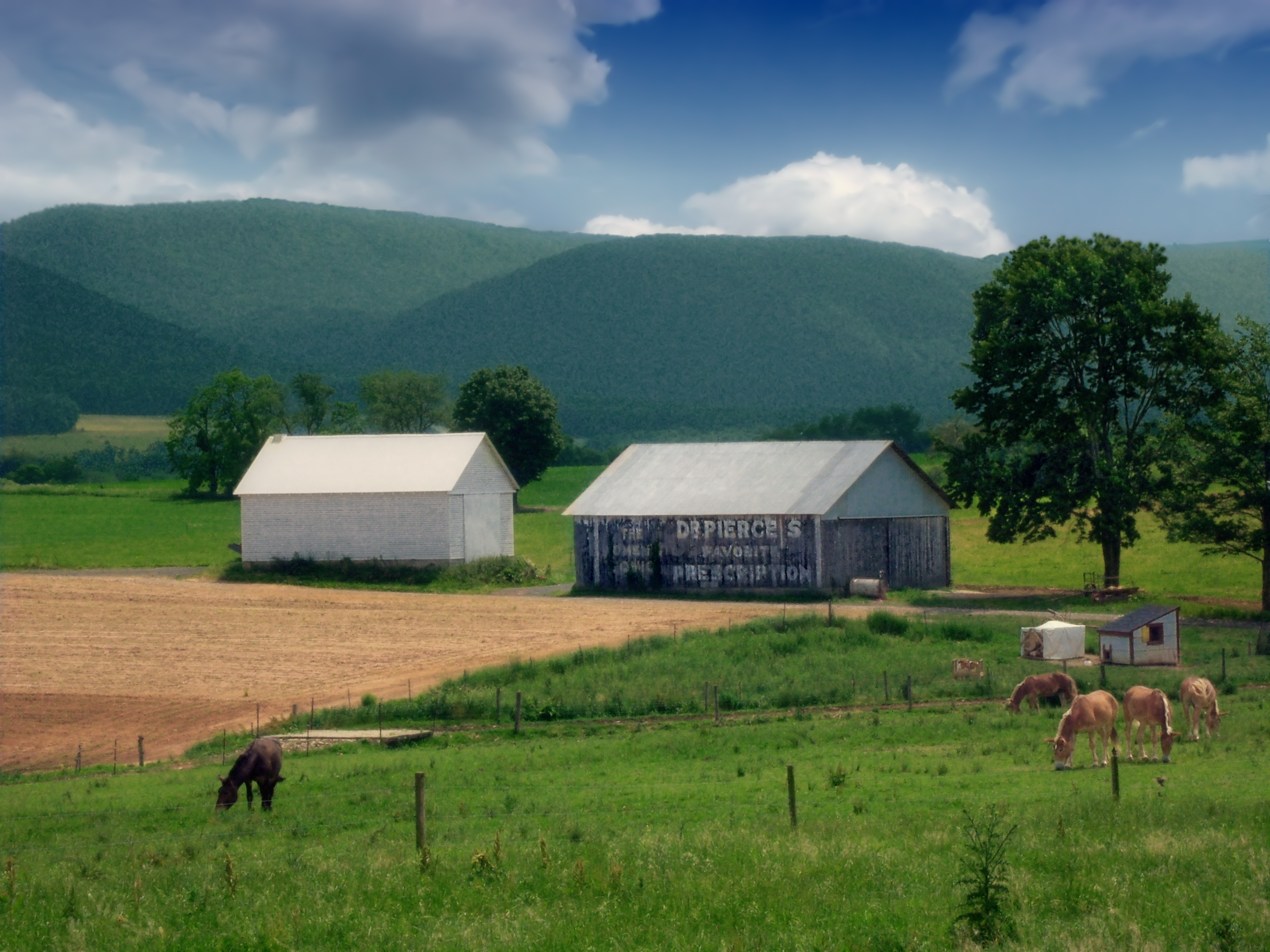
- A farm in the Nittany Valley in the township

- Location in Clinton County and the state of Pennsylvania.
- Country: United States
- State: Pennsylvania
- County: Clinton
- Settled: 1795
- Incorporated: 1840

Area
  - Total: 25.67 sq mi (66.49 km^{2})
  - Land: 25.56 sq mi (66.19 km^{2})
  - Water: 0.12 sq mi (0.30 km^{2})

Population (2020)
  - Total: 1,481 ▲
  - Estimate (2021): 1,482
  - Density: 58.6/sq mi (22.62/km^{2})
- FIPS code: 42-035-62152
- Website: portertownshippa.com

Porter Township is a township that is located in Clinton County, Pennsylvania, United States. The population was 1,481 at the time of the 2020 census.

== Geography ==
Porter Township is located in southern Clinton County and is bordered to the southwest by Centre County. The unincorporated community of Lamar is located in the western part of the township next to the county line, and Clintondale is adjacent to it to the northeast.

Interstate 80 passes through the township, with access from Exit 173 (Pennsylvania Route 64).

According to the United States Census Bureau, the township has a total area of 25.7 square miles (66.5 km^{2}), of which 25.6 square miles (66.2 km^{2}) is land and 0.1 square miles (0.3 km^{2}), or 0.45%, is water.

== Demographics ==
Historical population
| Census | Pop. | Note | %± |
|---|---|---|---|
| 1980 | 1,492 | | — |
| 1990 | 1,437 | | −3.7% |
| 2000 | 1,419 | | −1.3% |
| 2010 | 1,460 | | 2.9% |
| 2020 | 1,481 | | 1.4% |
| 2021 (est.) | 1,482 | | 0.1% |

As of the census of 2000, there were 1,419 people, 559 households, and 427 families residing in the township. The population density was 55.3 inhabitants per square mile (21.4/km^{2}). There were 615 housing units at an average density of 23.9/sq mi (9.2/km^{2}). The racial makeup of the township was 99.37% White, 0.07% African American, 0.14% Asian, and 0.42% from two or more races. Hispanic or Latino of any race were 0.35% of the population.

There were 559 households, out of which 29.5% had children under the age of 18 living with them, 64.9% were married couples living together, 8.1% had a female householder with no husband present, and 23.6% were non-families. 20.0% of all households were made up of individuals, and 9.5% had someone living alone who was 65 years of age or older. The average household size was 2.54 and the average family size was 2.89.

In the township the population was spread out, with 23.5% under the age of 18, 7.3% from 18 to 24, 27.0% from 25 to 44, 26.8% from 45 to 64, and 15.4% who were 65 years of age or older. The median age was 40 years. For every 100 females, there were 106.6 males. For every 100 females age 18 and over, there were 101.1 males.

The median income for a household in the township was $35,833, and the median income for a family was $41,125. Males had a median income of $29,866 versus $20,720 for females. The per capita income for the township was $16,161. About 7.6% of families and 11.5% of the population were below the poverty line, including 16.9% of those under age 18 and 6.5% of those age 65 or over.
