= Nathan Harvey House =

Historic house in Pennsylvania, United States

- U.S. National Register of Historic Places
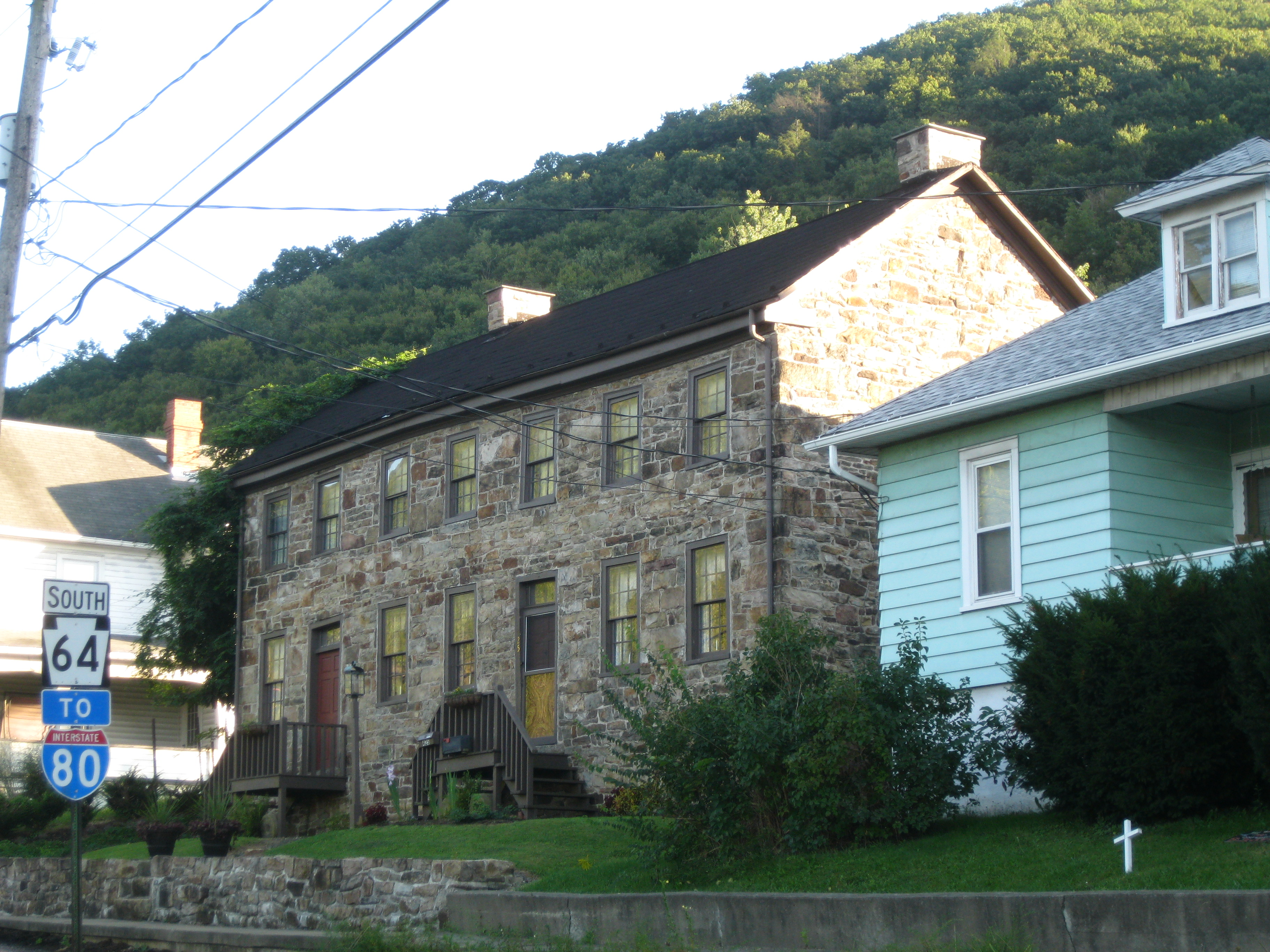
- The Nathan Harvey House in August 2012

- Location within Pennsylvania Location within the United States
- Location: 425-427 S. Water St., Mill Hall, Pennsylvania
- Coordinates: 41°6′36″N 77°29′6″W
- Area: 0.2 acres (0.081 ha)
- Built: c. 1804
- Architectural style: Georgian
- NRHP reference No.: 85000034
- Added to NRHP: January 3, 1985

Nathan Harvey House is a historic home located at Mill Hall in Clinton County, Pennsylvania, United States. It was built about 1804, and is a two-story, rectangular stone dwelling, seven bays wide. It has a gable roof and exemplifies Georgian style design characteristics. It features a full-width front porch. It was built by Mill Hall's first settler and founding father Nathan Harvey.

It was listed on the National Register of Historic Places in 1985.
