= Tannertown, Pennsylvania =

Extinct town in Pennsylvania, U.S.

Tannertown
- Extinct town
- Location in Pennsylvania
- Coordinates: 40°58′15″N 77°02′16″W
- Country: United States
- State: Pennsylvania
- County: Union County
- Township: West Buffalo Township

Tannertown is an extinct town in Central Pennsylvania. It lay between the small villages of Forest Hill and Cowan on Buffalo Road (Pennsylvania Route 192) in West Buffalo Township, Pennsylvania.
