= Greene Township, Clinton County, Pennsylvania =

Township in Pennsylvania, US

Coordinates: 40°59′30″N 77°19′59″W

- Township
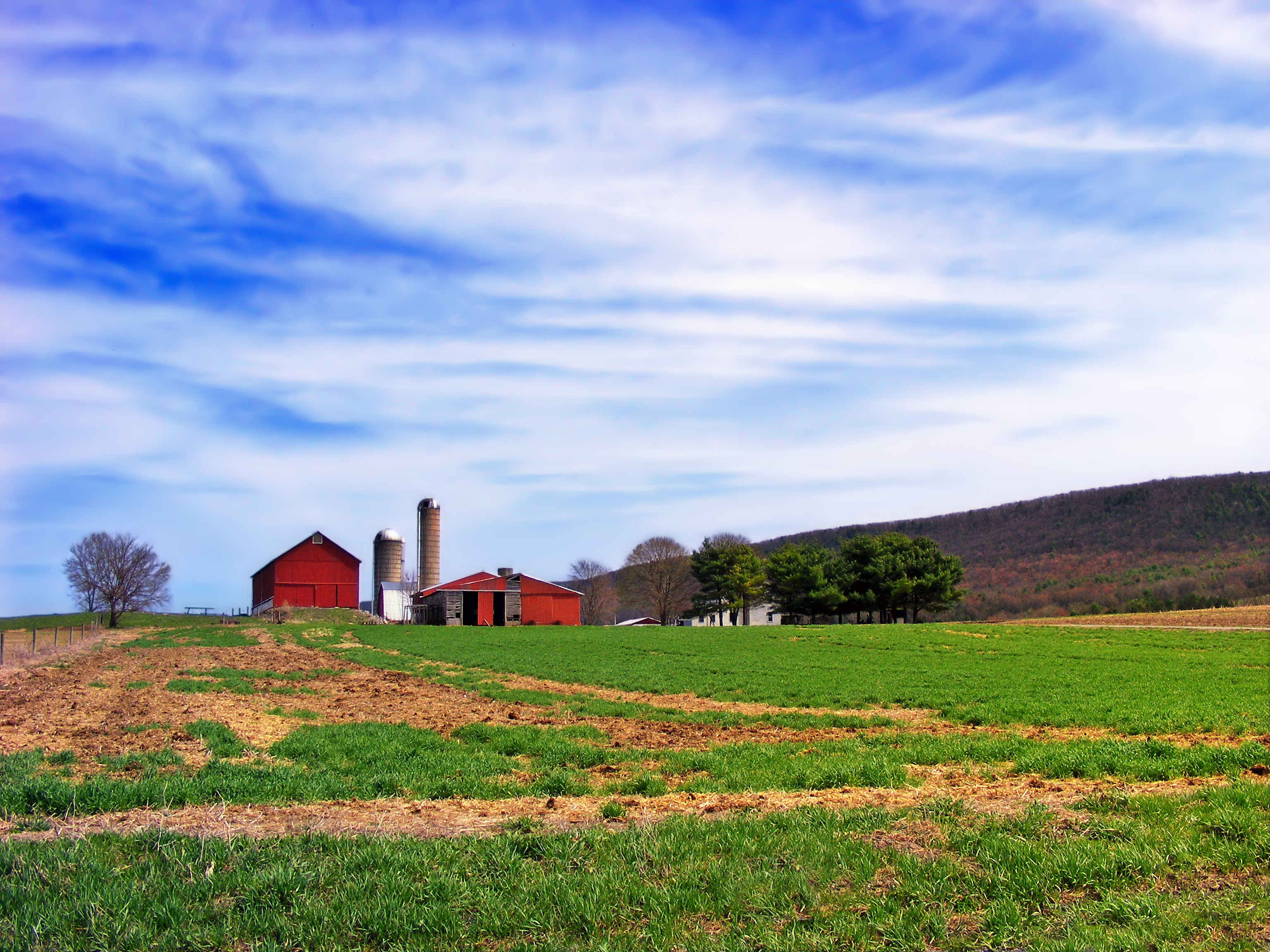
- A farm in Greene Township

- Location in Clinton County and the state of Pennsylvania.
- Country: United States
- State: Pennsylvania
- County: Clinton
- Settled: 1830
- Incorporated: 1840

Area
  - Total: 46.99 sq mi (121.71 km^{2})
  - Land: 46.77 sq mi (121.14 km^{2})
  - Water: 0.22 sq mi (0.58 km^{2})

Population (2020)
  - Total: 1,750 ▲
  - Estimate (2021): 1,766
  - Density: 37.1/sq mi (14.34/km^{2})
- FIPS code: 42-035-30928
- Website: www.greenetwpclintonpa.gov

Greene Township is a township in Clinton County, Pennsylvania, United States. The population was 1,750 at the 2020 census, up from 1,695 in 2010.

== Geography ==
Greene Township is located in the southeastern corner of Clinton County, and is bordered to the northeast by Lycoming County, to the east by Union County, and to the south by Centre County. The township surrounds the borough of Loganton, a separate municipality. Interstate 80 runs from east to west the length of the township, with access from Exits 185 and 192.

According to the United States Census Bureau, the township has a total area of 47.0 square miles (121.7 km^{2}), of which 46.8 square miles (121.1 km^{2}) is land and 0.23 square miles (0.6 km^{2}), or 0.47%, is water.

== Demographics ==
Historical population
Census	Pop.	Note	%±
1980	1,002		—
1990	1,153		15.1%
2000	1,464		27.0%
2010	1,695		15.8%
2020	1,750		3.2%
2021 (est.)	1,766		0.9%

As of the census of 2000, there were 1,464 people, 480 households, and 392 families residing in the township. The population density was 31.3 inhabitants per square mile (12.1/km^{2}). There were 647 housing units at an average density of 13.8/sq mi (5.3/km^{2}). The racial makeup of the township was 99.11% White, 0.20% African American, 0.07% Native American, 0.14% Pacific Islander, and 0.48% from two or more races. Hispanic or Latino of any race were 0.75% of the population.

There were 480 households, out of which 39.0% had children under the age of 18 living with them, 74.0% were married couples living together, 5.0% had a female householder with no husband present, and 18.3% were non-families. 16.0% of all households were made up of individuals, and 7.3% had someone living alone who was 65 years of age or older. The average household size was 3.05 and the average family size was 3.44.

In the township the population was spread out, with 31.8% under the age of 18, 9.2% from 18 to 24, 28.1% from 25 to 44, 20.3% from 45 to 64, and 10.6% who were 65 years of age or older. The median age was 33 years. For every 100 females, there were 105.6 males. For every 100 females age 18 and over, there were 104.5 males.

The median income for a household in the township was $35,278, and the median income for a family was $37,772. Males had a median income of $30,417 versus $20,875 for females. The per capita income for the township was $14,500. About 9.5% of families and 13.7% of the population were below the poverty line, including 22.3% of those under age 18 and 10.4% of those age 65 or over.
