= Rebersburg, Pennsylvania =

Unincorporated community in Pennsylvania, US

- Census-designated place
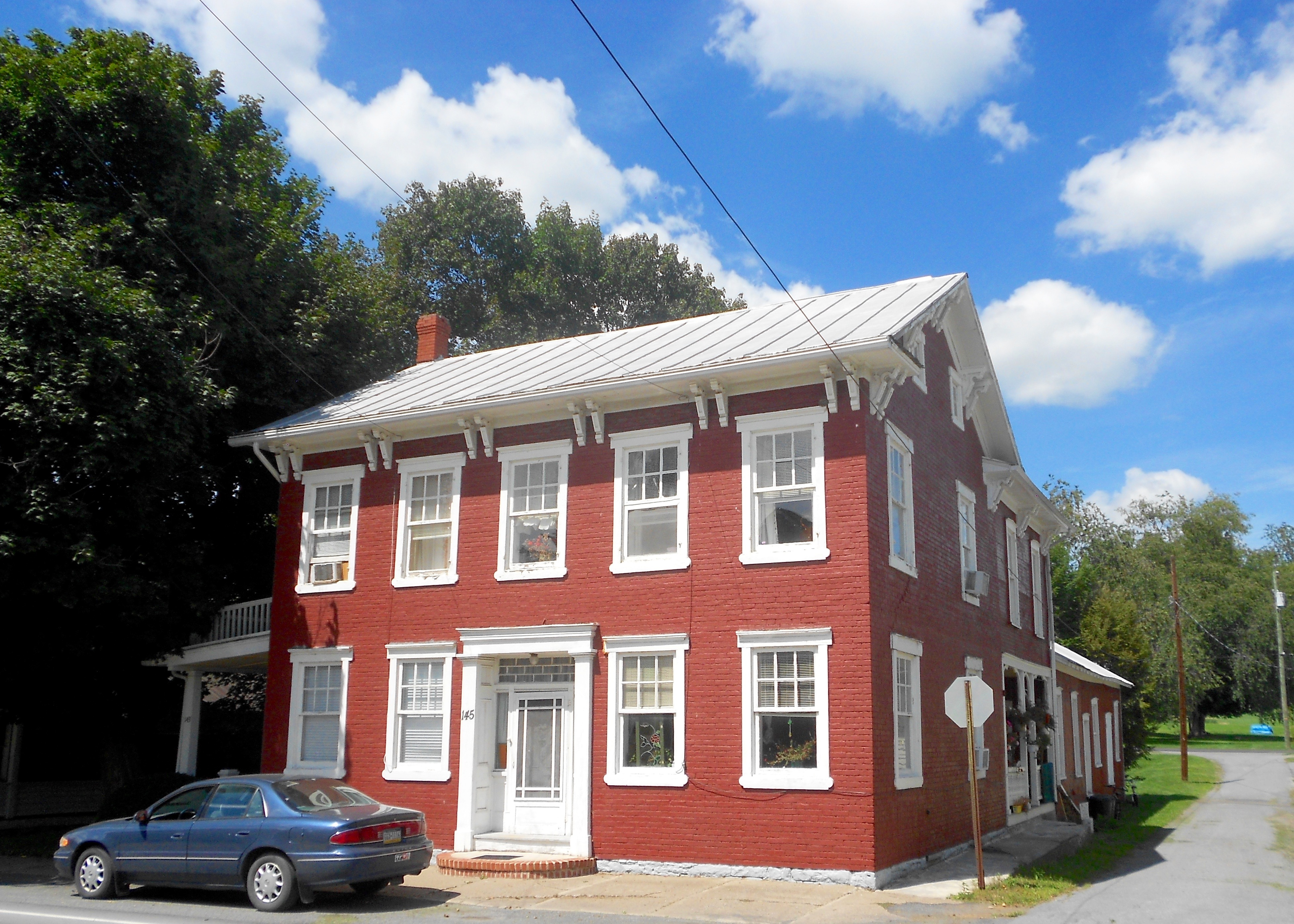
- House in Rebersburg

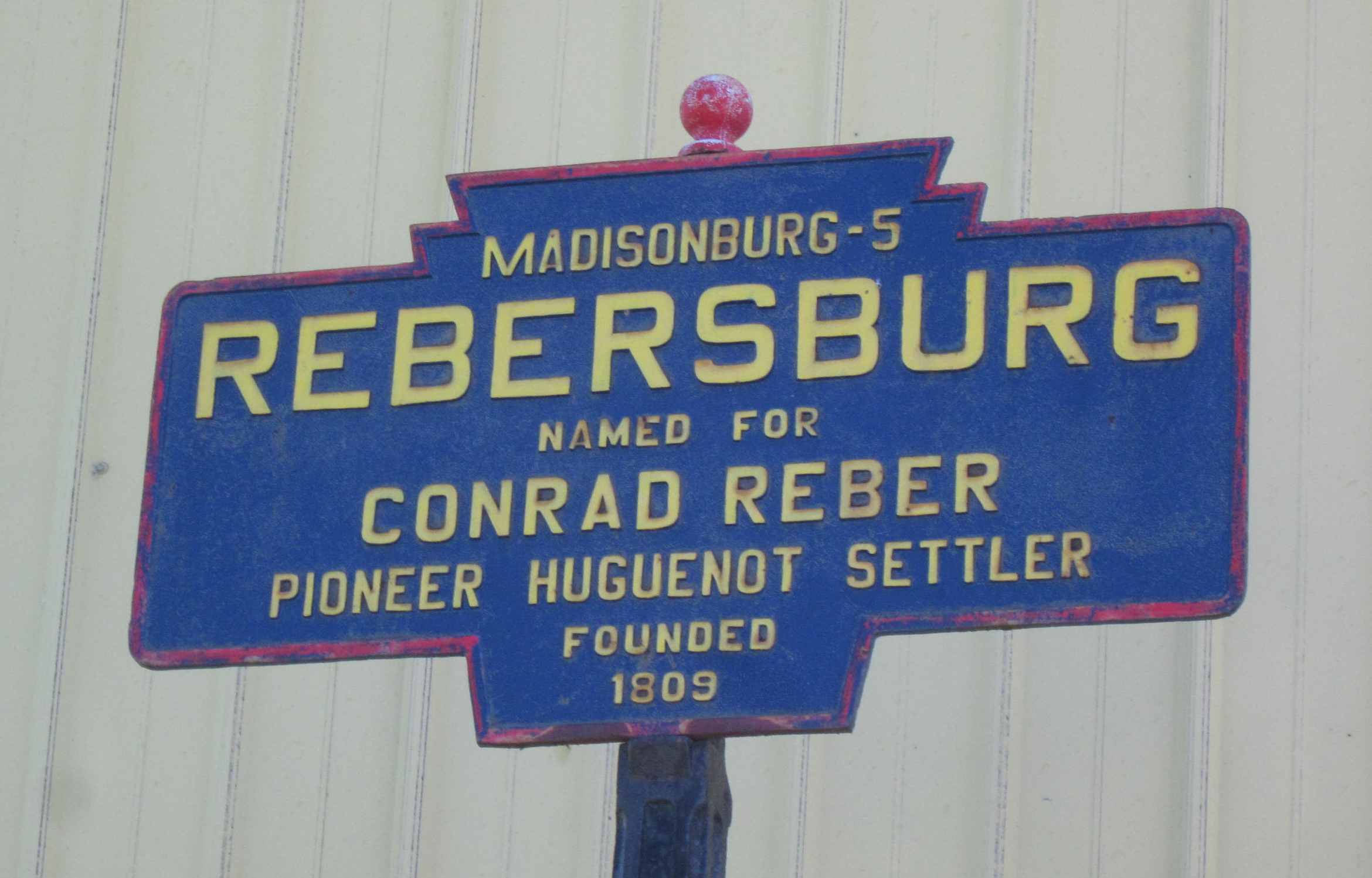
- Keystone Marker

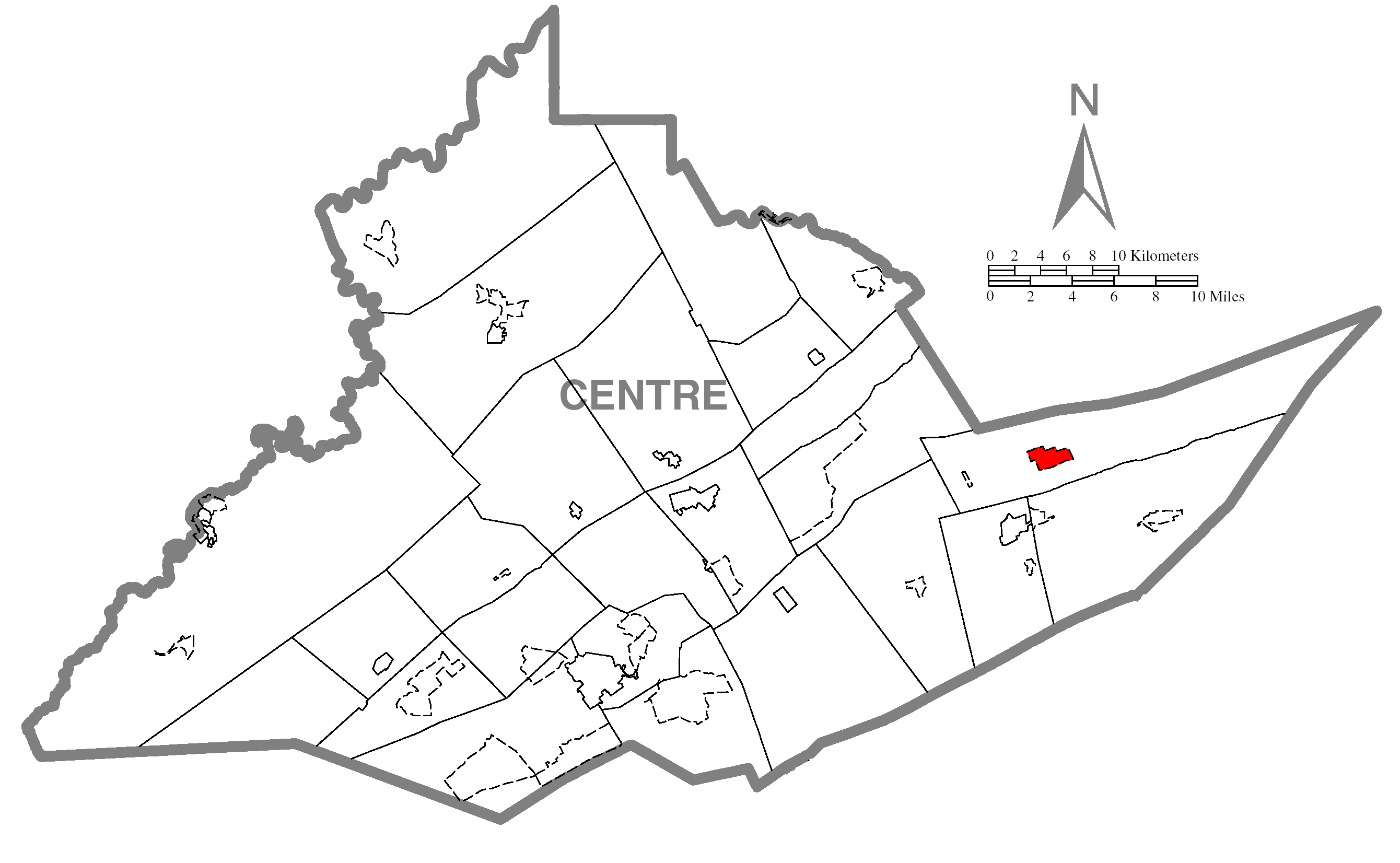
- Location within Centre County

- Location within the U.S. state of Pennsylvania Rebersburg (the United States)
- Coordinates: 40°56′49″N 77°26′38″W
- Country: United States
- State: Pennsylvania
- County: Centre
- Township: Miles

Area
  - Total: 1.36 sq mi (3.52 km^{2})
  - Land: 1.36 sq mi (3.52 km^{2})
  - Water: 0 sq mi (0.00 km^{2})
- Elevation: 1,290 ft (390 m)

Population (2020)
  - Total: 488
  - Density: 358.9/sq mi (138.56/km^{2})
- Time zone: UTC-5 (Eastern (EST))
  - Summer (DST): UTC-4 (EDT)
- ZIP code: 16872
- Area code: 814
- FIPS code: 42-63688
- GNIS code: 1184745

Rebersburg is an unincorporated community and census-designated place (CDP) in Centre County, Pennsylvania, United States. Rebersburg is part of the State College, Pennsylvania Metropolitan Statistical Area. The population was 494 at the 2010 census and includes many Amish in the area.

== Geography ==
Rebersburg is located in eastern Centre County at 40°56′49″N 77°26′38″W (40.946852, -77.443835), in the western part of Miles Township. It is in the Brush Valley, part of the Ridge-and-Valley Province of the Appalachian Mountains, sitting between Nittany Mountain to the north and Brush Mountain/Shriner Mountain to the south.

Pennsylvania Route 192 passes through the town as it runs the length of Brush Valley, leading west 4 miles (6 km) to Madisonburg and 14 miles (23 km) to Centre Hall, and east 31 miles (50 km) to Lewisburg. Pennsylvania Route 880 leads north from Rebersburg over Mount Nittany into Sugar Valley and the borough of Loganton.

According to the United States Census Bureau, Rebersburg has a total area of 1.36 square miles (3.52 km^{2}), all land.

== Demographics ==
Historical population
Census	Pop.	Note	%±
2020	488		—
U.S. Decennial Census

As of the census of 2010, there were 494 people, 179 households, and 134 families residing in the CDP. The population density was 328.1 inhabitants per square mile (126.7/km^{2}). There were 195 housing units at an average density of 128.9/sq mi (49.8/km^{2}). The racial makeup of the CDP was 97.8% White, 0.4% Black or African American, 0.2% Native American, 0.6% Asian, and 1.0% from two or more races.

There were 179 households, out of which 36.3% had children under the age of 18 living with them, 62.0% were married couples living together, 5.0% had a male householder with no wife present, 7.8% had a female householder with no husband present, and 25.1% were non-families. 20.7% of all households were made up of individuals, and 8.3% had someone living alone who was 65 years of age or older. The average household size was 2.76 and the average family size was 3.23.

In the CDP, the population was spread out, with 29.8% under the age of 18, 7.5% from 18 to 24, 21.3% from 25 to 44, 24.2% from 45 to 64, and 17.2% who were 65 years of age or older. The median age was 38 years. For every 100 females, there were 87.1 males. For every 100 females age 18 and over, there were 85.6 males.

The median income for a household in the CDP was $31,417, and the median income for a family was $41,458. The per capita income for the CDP was $21,702. About 3.0% of families and 7.7% of the population were below the poverty line, including 5.6% of those under age 18 and 4.4% of those age 65 or over.

== Notable people ==
- Henry Meyer, Pennsylvania Dutch poet
- Calvin Ziegler, Pennsylvania Dutch poet
