= Calvin Ziegler =

German-American poet (1854–1930)

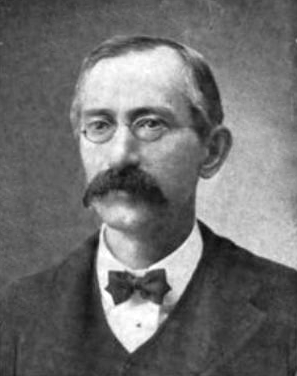
- Born: Charles Calvin Ziegler; June 19, 1854; Rebersburg, Pennsylvania, US
- Died: April 23, 1930 (aged 75); St. Louis, Missouri, US
- Occupation: German-American poet
- Known for: Poetry written in "Pennsylvania Dutch" language

Charles Calvin Ziegler (1854–1930) was a German-American poet from Rebersburg, Pennsylvania. His native language was Pennsylvania Dutch, and although he learned English in school, he wrote his poetry in the Pennsylvania Dutch language. He is said to have been the most accomplished poet to write in it, and may have written the only Pennsylvania Dutch sonnet on record.

== Biography ==
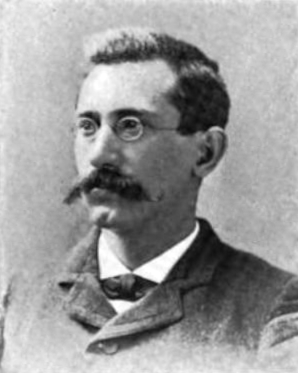
As a Harvard undergraduate

Ziegler was born on a farm on June 19, 1854, to a 39-year-old mother and an even older father. He had at least one older brother, Samuel, who moved to Iowa when Calvin was still young. When he was sixteen, Calvin went to join Samuel, eventually graduating the University of Iowa in 1878. He returned to Rebersburg and pursued teaching, but left again in October 1881 to study Greek and Latin at Harvard. In 1884 he graduated magna cum laude and returned briefly to Rebersburg. He left for good in 1885, settling in St. Louis.

Ziegler published a volume of poems with a Leipzig publisher in 1891, Drauss un Deheem, helping spur a revival of Pennsylvania Dutch literature. Included in the volume in a set of nineteen poems devoted to his mother, who died weeks before his Harvard graduation. The volume was republished in Pennsylvania in 1936, with some additional material.

Calvin Ziegler died in St. Louis on April 23, 1930.

== Bibliography ==
- Drauss un Deheem: Gedichte in Pennsylvänisch Deitsch (Hesse & Becker, 1891)
- Snowflakes (translation from Longfellow)
