= Nittany, Pennsylvania =

Unincorporated community in Pennsylvania, US

- Census designated place
- Map showing Centre County in Pennsylvania

- Location in Pennsylvania Nittany (the United States)
- Coordinates: 40°59′52″N 77°33′22″W
- Country: United States
- State: Pennsylvania
- County: Centre
- Township: Walker

Area
  - Total: 1.42 sq mi (3.67 km^{2})
  - Land: 1.42 sq mi (3.67 km^{2})
  - Water: 0 sq mi (0.00 km^{2})
- Elevation: 894 ft (272 m)

Population (2020)
  - Total: 624
  - Density: 440.6/sq mi (170.12/km^{2})
- Time zone: UTC-5 (Eastern (EST))
  - Summer (DST): UTC-4 (EDT)
- ZIP Code: 16841
- Area code: 814
- FIPS code: 42-54520
- GNIS feature ID: 1182480

Nittany is an unincorporated community and census-designated place in Walker Township, Centre County, Pennsylvania, United States. As of the 2010 census, the population was 658.

It is located along the northeastern border of Centre County, next to Lamar in Clinton County. It lies in the Nittany Valley, between the long ridge of Nittany Mountain to the southeast and lower Sand Ridge to the northwest. The center of Nittany is at the intersections of PA Routes 64 and 445. PA 64 leads northeast through Lamar 3 miles (5 km) to Interstate 80 and southwest 9 miles (14 km) to Zion, while PA 445 leads southeast across Nittany and Brush mountains 12 miles (19 km) to Millheim.

Historical population
Census	Pop.	Note	%±
2020	624		—
U.S. Decennial Census

== Education ==
The CDP is in Bellefonte Area School District.
