= Lamar Township, Pennsylvania =

Township in Pennsylvania, US

Coordinates: 41°05′00″N 77°30′00″W

- Township
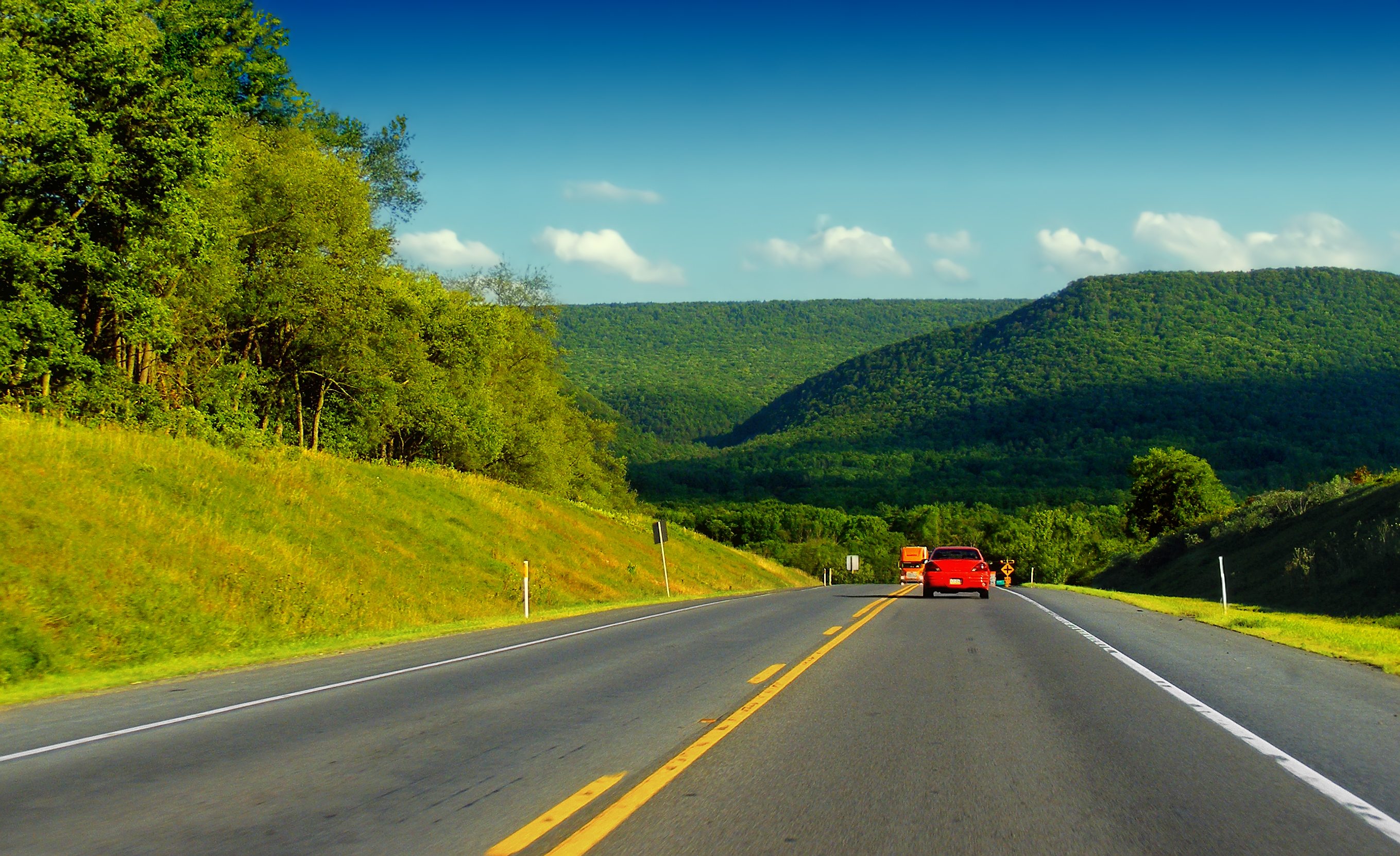
- U.S. Route 220 as it passes through Lamar Township

- Location in Clinton County and the state of Pennsylvania.
- Country: United States
- State: Pennsylvania
- County: Clinton
- Settled: 1800
- Incorporated: 1817

Area
  - Total: 41.00 sq mi (106.20 km^{2})
  - Land: 40.89 sq mi (105.91 km^{2})
  - Water: 0.11 sq mi (0.29 km^{2})

Population (2020)
  - Total: 2,600 ▲
  - Estimate (2021): 2,598
  - Density: 62.5/sq mi (24.13/km^{2})
- FIPS code: 42-035-41112
- Website: https://www.lamartownship.com/

Lamar Township is a township in Clinton County, Pennsylvania, United States. The population was 2,600 at the time of the 2020 census.

== Geography ==
The township is located in southern Clinton County and includes the census-designated places of Rote and Salona. Interstate 80 runs east–west through the township, with one interchange (Exit 178): U.S. Route 220, which leads north to Mill Hall and Lock Haven, the county seat.

According to the United States Census Bureau, Lamar Township has a total area of 41.0 square miles (106.2 km^{2}), of which 40.9 square miles (105.9 km^{2}) is land and 0.12 square miles (0.3 km^{2}), or 0.27%, is water.

== Demographics ==
Historical population
| Census | Pop. | Note | %± |
|---|---|---|---|
| 1980 | 2,384 | | — |
| 1990 | 2,345 | | −1.6% |
| 2000 | 2,450 | | 4.5% |
| 2010 | 2,517 | | 2.7% |
| 2020 | 2,600 | | 3.3% |
| 2021 (est.) | 2,598 | | −0.1% |

As of the census of 2000, there were 2,450 people, 901 households, and 718 families residing in the township.

The population density was 59.8 inhabitants per square mile (23.1/km^{2}). There were 967 housing units at an average density of 23.6/sq mi (9.1/km^{2}).

The racial makeup of the township was 99.10% White, 0.16% African American, 0.12% Native American, 0.16% Asian, and 0.45% from two or more races. Hispanic or Latino of any race were 0.37% of the population.

There were 901 households, out of which 32.4% had children under the age of eighteen living with them; 70.5% were married couples living together, 6.0% had a female householder with no husband present, and 20.2% were non-families. 16.8% of all households were made up of individuals, and 9.7% had someone living alone who was sixty-five years of age or older.

The average household size was 2.72 and the average family size was 3.05.

Within the township, the population was spread out, with 24.7% who were under the age of eighteen, 8.4% who were aged eighteen to twenty-four, 27.3% who were aged twenty-five to forty-four, 25.0% who were aged forty-five to sixty-four, and 14.6% who were sixty-five years of age or older. The median age was forty years.

For every one hundred females, there were 98.5 males. For every one hundred females who were aged eighteen or older, there were 95.1 males.

The median income for a household in the township was $35,332, and the median income for a family was $38,235. Males had a median income of $30,516 compared with that of $19,278 for females.

The per capita income for the township was $15,464.

Approximately 7.8% of families and 9.9% of the population were living below the poverty line, including 12.6% of those who were under the age of eighteen and 13.8% of those who were aged sixty-five or older.
