= Brush Valley (Pennsylvania) =

Valley in Pennsylvania, United States

- Location within Pennsylvania
- Length: 16 miles (26 km) northeast-southwest
- Width: 1 mile (1.6 km) average

Geography
- Location: Centre County, Pennsylvania
- Population centers: Madisonburg and Rebersburg
- Borders on: Nittany Mountain (west/north); Brush Mountain (east/south)
- Coordinates: 40°56′N 77°28′W
- Interactive map of Brush Valley

Brush Valley is a southwest to northeast narrow valley of the Ridge-and Valley Province of the Appalachian Mountains in central Pennsylvania. The valley is bordered by Nittany Mountain to the north and Brush Mountain to the south in Gregg and Miles Townships in eastern Centre County. The main route of travel through the valley is PA Route 192 which starts at Centre Hall and travels the entirety of the valley before the valley ends near the village of Livonia in the Bald Eagle State Forest near R.B. Winter State Park. The valley is a little over 16 mi (26 km) in length and averages around 1 mi (1.6 km) in width. At its widest point it reaches only around 1.5 mi (2.4 km).

== Geography ==
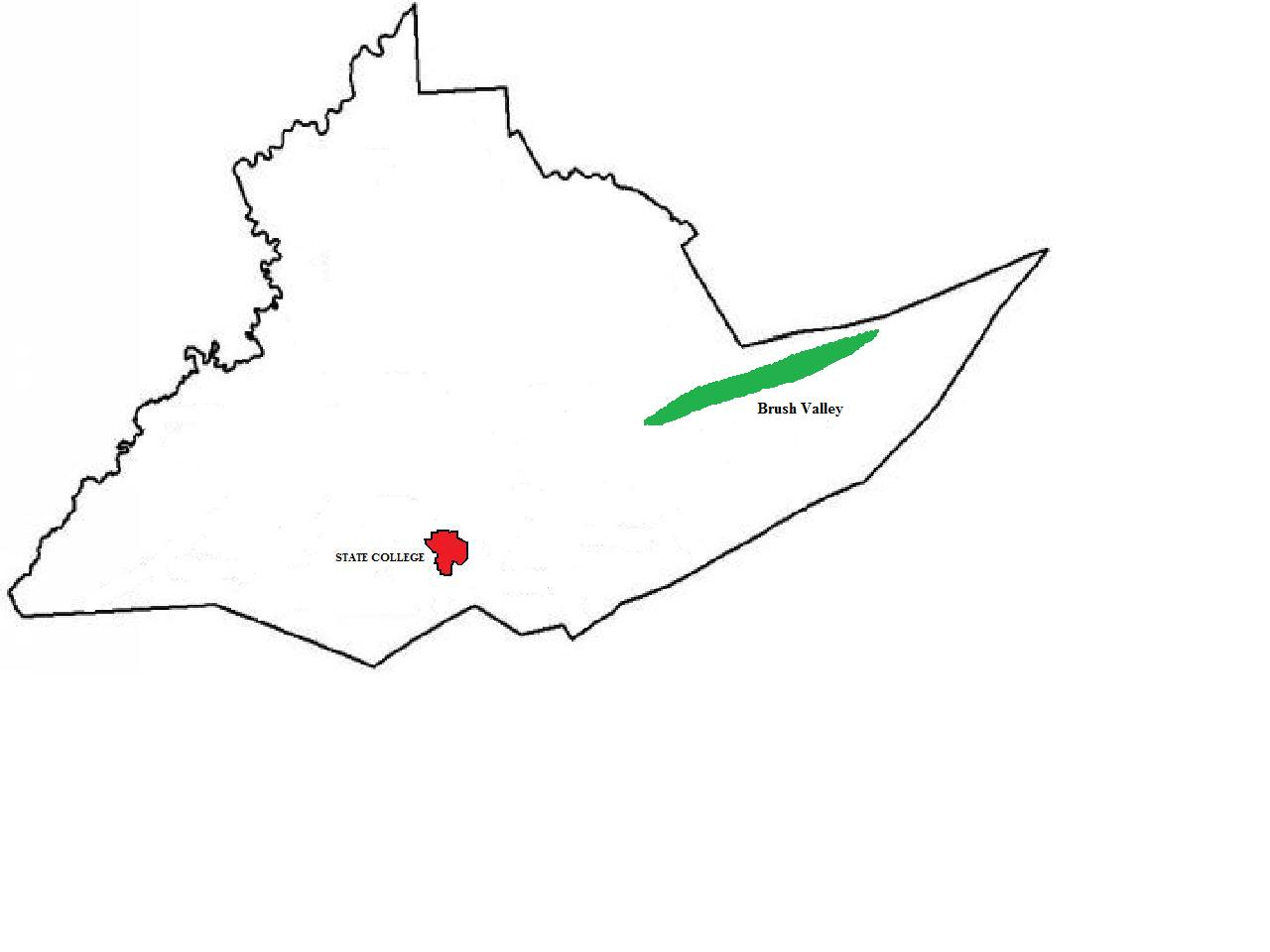
Location of Brush Valley in Centre County, Pennsylvania

Location of Centre County in Pennsylvania
