= Salona, Pennsylvania =

Unincorporated community in Pennsylvania, US

- Unincorporated community
- Location within Pennsylvania
- Coordinates: 41°05′03″N 77°27′47″W
- Country: United States
- State: Pennsylvania
- County: Clinton
- Elevation: 614 ft (187 m)
- Time zone: UTC-5 (Eastern (EST))
  - Summer (DST): UTC-4 (EDT)
- Area codes: 272 & 570
- GNIS feature ID: 1214008

Salona is an unincorporated community in Lamar Township, Clinton County, Pennsylvania, United States. The community is located along Pennsylvania Route 477, 3.7 miles (6.0 km) south of Lock Haven. It was named for the Greek city of Thessalonica.
