= Lamar, Pennsylvania =

Unincorporated community in Pennsylvania, US

- Census-designated place
- Location in Clinton County and the state of Pennsylvania.
- Coordinates: 41°00′54″N 77°31′50″W
- Country: United States
- State: Pennsylvania
- County: Clinton
- Township: Porter

Area
  - Total: 1.13 sq mi (2.92 km^{2})
  - Land: 1.12 sq mi (2.89 km^{2})
  - Water: 0.012 sq mi (0.03 km^{2})
- Elevation: 795 ft (242 m)

Population (2020)
  - Total: 561
  - Density: 503.3/sq mi (194.32/km^{2})
- Time zone: UTC-5 (Eastern (EST))
  - Summer (DST): UTC-4 (EDT)
- ZIP code: 16848
- FIPS code: 42-41104
- GNIS feature ID: 2634235

Lamar is a census-designated place in Porter Township in southern Clinton County, Pennsylvania, United States. As of the 2010 census the population was 562.

The community is located along Pennsylvania Route 64 in southern Clinton County and is bordered on the west by Nittany in Walker Township, Centre County. PA 64 leads northeast 1 mile (2 km) to Exit 173 on Interstate 80 and 11 miles (18 km) to Lock Haven, the Clinton County seat, and southwest through Nittany 23 miles (37 km) to State College.

The community is named for Revolutionary War Major Marien Lamar, who was killed in the Battle of Paoli, as stated in the "History of Centre and Clinton Counties, Pennsylvania" by John Blair Linn. Major Lamar was born in Maryland.

== Demographics ==
Historical population
Census	Pop.	Note	%±
2020	561		—
U.S. Decennial Census
