= Mill Hall, Pennsylvania =

Borough in Pennsylvania, US

- Borough
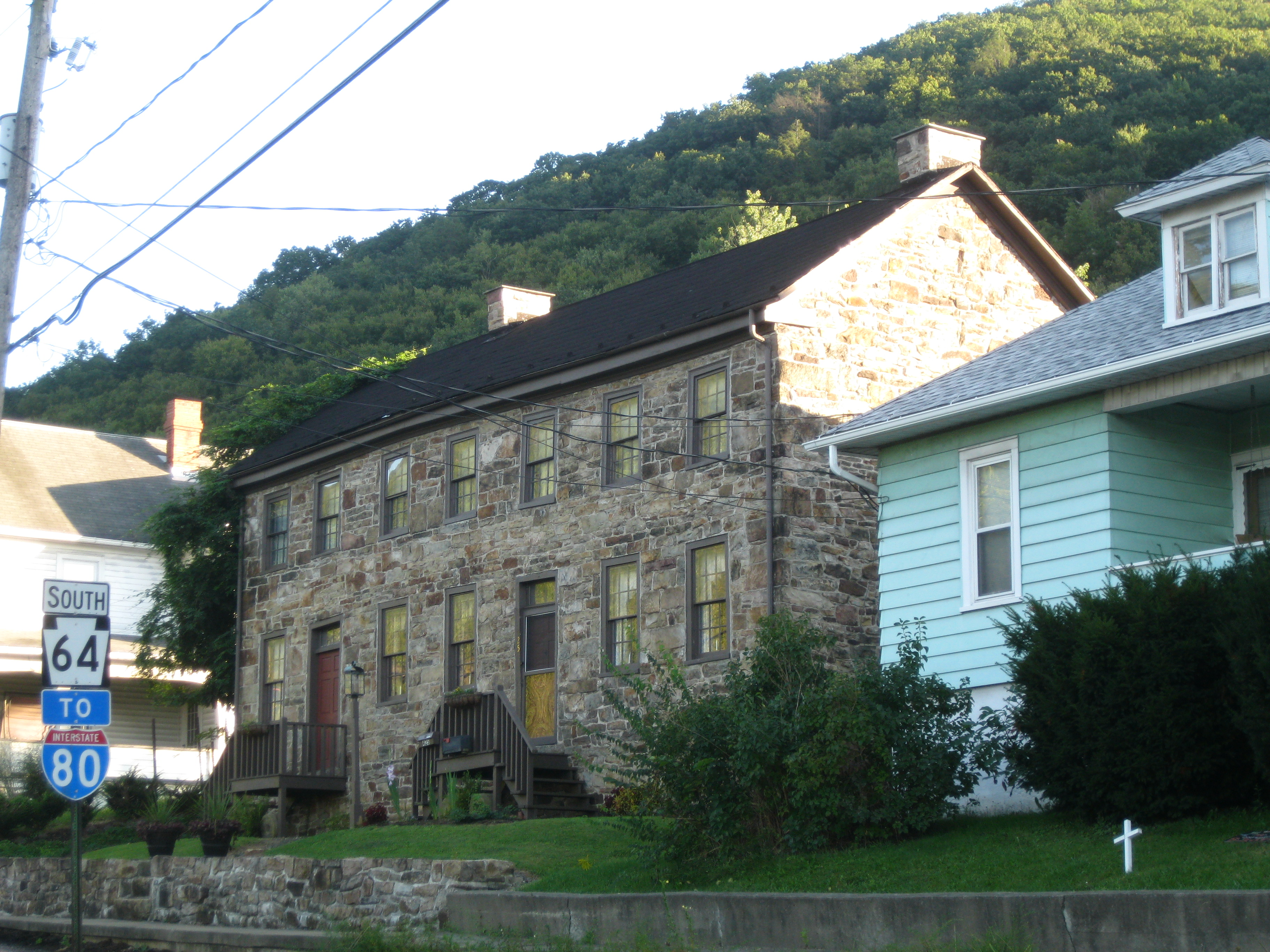
- The Nathan Harvey House, a historic site in the borough

- Location in Clinton County and the U.S. state of Pennsylvania.
- Coordinates: 41°06′26″N 77°29′3″W
- Country: United States
- State: Pennsylvania
- County: Clinton
- Settled: 1806
- Incorporated (borough): 1849

Government
  - Type: Borough Council

Area
  - Total: 0.95 sq mi (2.45 km^{2})
  - Land: 0.92 sq mi (2.39 km^{2})
  - Water: 0.027 sq mi (0.07 km^{2})
- Elevation: 568 ft (173 m)

Population (2020)
  - Total: 1,479
  - Density: 1,605.4/sq mi (619.85/km^{2})
- Time zone: Eastern (EST)
  - Summer (DST): EDT
- ZIP code: 17751
- Area codes: 570 and 272
- FIPS code: 42-49760
- Website: https://millhallboroughpa.org/

Mill Hall is a borough in Clinton County, Pennsylvania, United States. As of the 2020 census, Mill Hall had a population of 1,479.

== History ==
The Nathan Harvey House was listed on the National Register of Historic Places in 1985.

== Geography ==
Mill Hall is located in southern Clinton County at 41°6′23″N 77°29′16″W (41.105359, -77.487804), on both sides of Fishing Creek between its exit from a water gap through Bald Eagle Mountain to the south and its mouth at Bald Eagle Creek to the north.

U.S. Route 220, a four-lane freeway, follows Fishing Creek through the Bald Eagle Mountain water gap and crosses the southeastern corner of Mill Hall, with access from Exit 109. Pennsylvania Route 64 passes through the center of Mill Hall, also leading south through the water gap and ending to the north at Pennsylvania Route 150, which follows the northern boundary of the borough. Via PA 150, it is 3 miles (5 km) northeast to Lock Haven, the Clinton County seat. US 220 leads south 5 miles (8 km) to Interstate 80 Exit 178.

According to the United States Census Bureau, Mill Hall has a total area of 0.95 square miles (2.45 km^{2}), of which 0.92 square miles (2.39 km^{2}) is land and 0.03 square miles (0.07 km^{2}), or 2.80%, is water.

== Demographics ==
Historical population
Census	Pop.	Note	%±
1850	491		—
1860	400		−18.5%
1870	452		13.0%
1880	398		−11.9%
1890	503		26.4%
1900	1,010		100.8%
1910	1,043		3.3%
1920	1,238		18.7%
1930	1,421		14.8%
1940	1,513		6.5%
1950	1,677		10.8%
1960	1,891		12.8%
1970	1,838		−2.8%
1980	1,744		−5.1%
1990	1,702		−2.4%
2000	1,568		−7.9%
2010	1,613		2.9%
2020	1,479		−8.3%

As of the census of 2000, there were 1,568 people, 662 households, and 456 families residing in the borough. The population density was 1,554.8 inhabitants per square mile (600.3/km^{2}). There were 710 housing units at an average density of 704.0 per square mile (271.8/km^{2}). The racial makeup of the borough was 99.17% White, 0.06% African American, 0.06% Native American, 0.26% Asian, 0.06% from other races, and 0.38% from two or more races. Hispanic or Latino of any race were 0.13% of the population.

There were 662 households, out of which 28.7% had children under the age of 18 living with them, 54.2% were married couples living together, 10.6% had a female householder with no husband present, and 31.0% were non-families. 26.4% of all households were made up of individuals, and 14.4% had someone living alone who was 65 years of age or older. The average household size was 2.37 and the average family size was 2.85.

In the borough the population was spread out, with 22.6% under the age of 18, 7.5% from 18 to 24, 27.2% from 25 to 44, 22.6% from 45 to 64, and 20.2% who were 65 years of age or older. The median age was 40 years. For every 100 females there were 92.9 males. For every 100 females age 18 and over, there were 83.7 males.

The median income for a household in the borough was $31,083, and the median income for a family was $36,250. Males had a median income of $27,283 versus $18,800 for females. The per capita income for the borough was $16,593. About 9.2% of families and 10.8% of the population were below the poverty line, including 15.7% of those under age 18 and 5.4% of those age 65 or over.
