= Walker Township, Centre County, Pennsylvania =

Township in Pennsylvania, US

Coordinates: 40°55′00″N 77°39′59″W

- Township
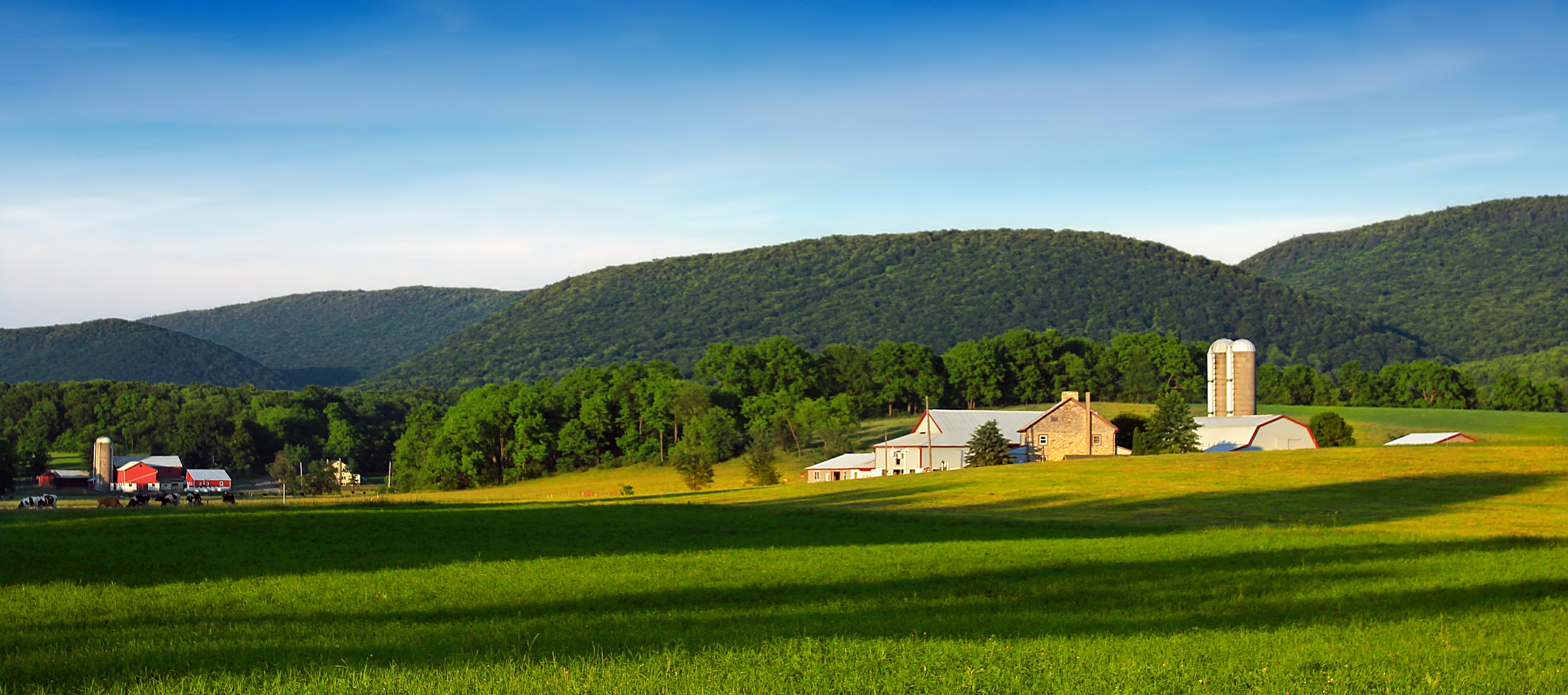
- Farms in the Nittany Valley

- Logo

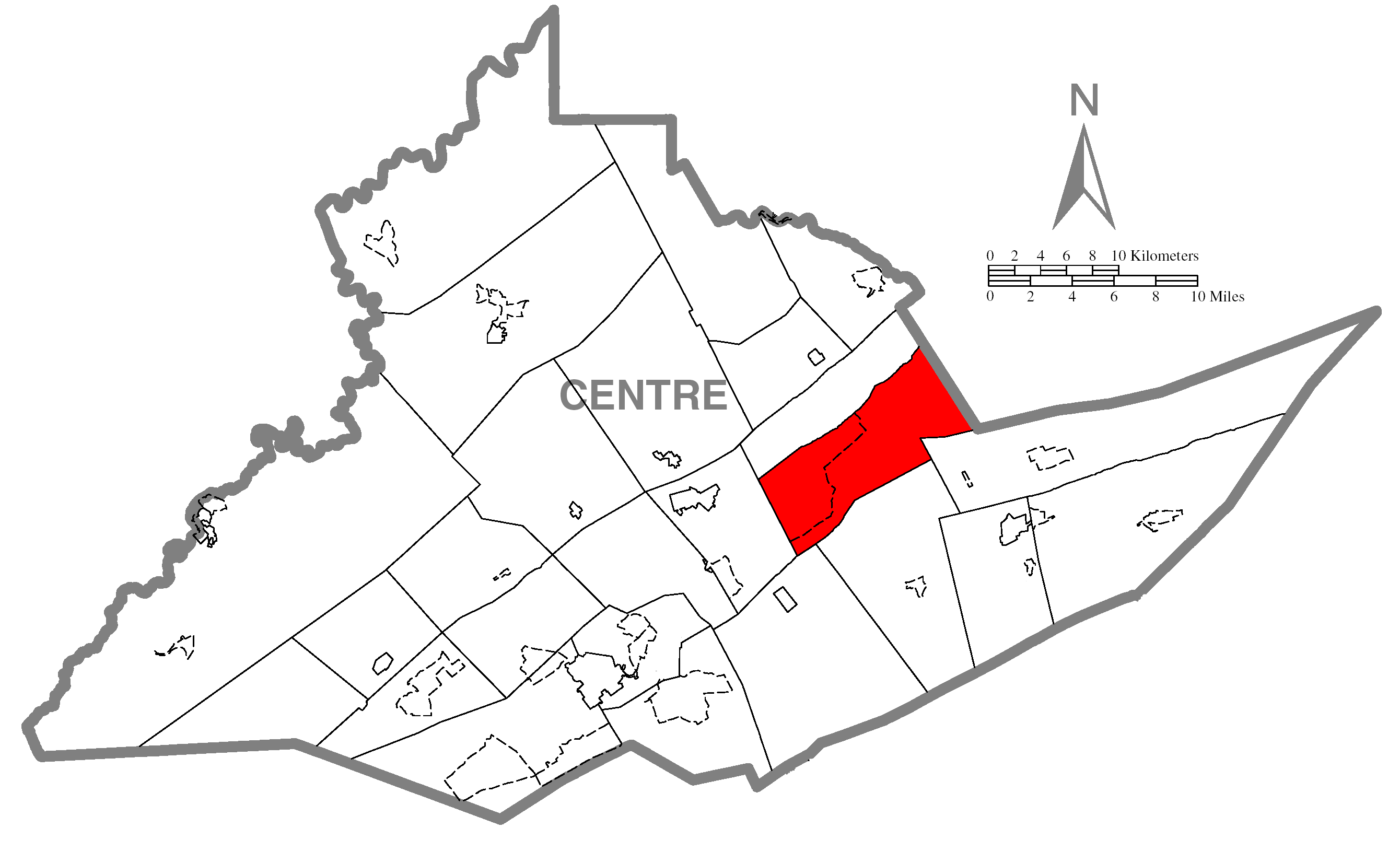
- Map of Centre County, Pennsylvania highlighting Walker Township

- Map of Centre County, Pennsylvania
- Country: United States
- State: Pennsylvania
- County: Centre
- Settled: 1792
- Incorporated: 1810

Area
  - Total: 38.36 sq mi (99.35 km^{2})
  - Land: 38.36 sq mi (99.35 km^{2})
  - Water: 0 sq mi (0.00 km^{2})

Population (2020)
  - Total: 4,639 ▲
  - Estimate (2021): 4,629
  - Density: 121.3/sq mi (46.84/km^{2})
- FIPS code: 42-027-80552
- Website: walkertownship.com

Walker Township is a township in Centre County, Pennsylvania, United States. It is part of the State College, Pennsylvania Metropolitan Statistical Area. The population was 4,639 at the 2020 census, an increase over the figure of 3,433 tabulated in 2010.

== Geography ==
According to the United States Census Bureau, the township has a total area of 38.3 square miles (99.3 km^{2}), all land.

Walker Township is bordered by Marion Township to the northwest, Clinton County to the northeast, Miles Township to the south and east, Gregg Township to the southeast, and Spring Township to the southwest.

The township contains the census-designated places of Hublersburg, Mingoville, Nittany, and parts of Snydertown and Zion.

== Demographics ==
Historical population
| Census | Pop. | Note | %± |
|---|---|---|---|
| 2000 | 3,299 | | — |
| 2010 | 4,433 | | 34.4% |
| 2020 | 4,639 | | 4.6% |
| 2021 (est.) | 4,629 | | −0.2% |
U.S. Decennial Census

As of the census of 2000, there were 3,299 people, 1,205 households, and 972 families residing in the township. The population density was 81.4 inhabitants per square mile (31.4/km^{2}). There were 1,257 housing units at an average density of 31.0 per square mile (12.0/km^{2}). The racial makeup of the township was 99.06% White, 0.09% African American, 0.06% Native American, 0.21% Asian, 0.12% from other races, and 0.45% from two or more races. Hispanic or Latino of any race were 0.36% of the population.

There were 1,205 households, out of which 33.4% had children under the age of 18 living with them, 72.8% were married couples living together, 5.1% had a female householder with no husband present, and 19.3% were non-families. 15.9% of all households were made up of individuals, and 7.1% had someone living alone who was 65 years of age or older. The average household size was 2.73 and the average family size was 3.06.

In the township the population was spread out, with 25.4% under the age of 18, 7.0% from 18 to 24, 29.4% from 25 to 44, 26.9% from 45 to 64, and 11.3% who were 65 years of age or older. The median age was 38 years. For every 100 females, there were 100.2 males. For every 100 females age 18 and over, there were 98.6 males.

The median income for a household in the township was $48,835, and the median income for a family was $54,613. Males had a median income of $36,578 versus $26,196 for females. The per capita income for the township was $19,130. About 4.0% of families and 6.1% of the population were below the poverty line, including 6.1% of those under age 18 and 15.6% of those age 65 or over.
