= Loganton, Pennsylvania =

Borough in Pennsylvania, US

- Borough
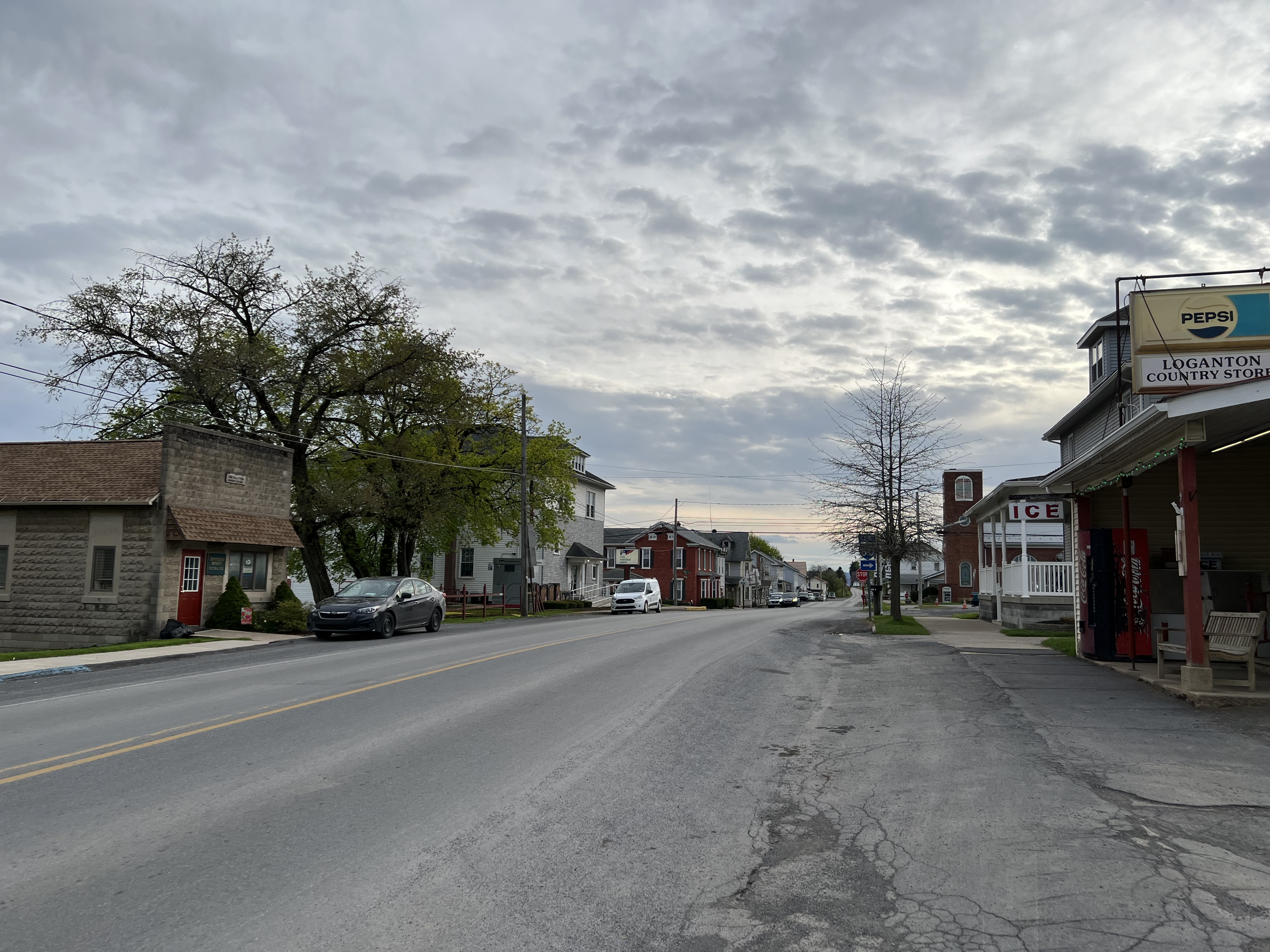
- East Main Street

- Location in Clinton County and the U.S. state of Pennsylvania.
- Coordinates: 41°02′03″N 77°18′23″W
- Country: United States
- State: Pennsylvania
- County: Clinton
- Settled: 1840
- Incorporated (borough): 1864

Government
  - Type: Borough Council
  - Mayor: Ashleigh Shadle
  - Council President: Arthur Slaterbeck
  - Council VP: Dianne Fye
  - Secretary/Treasurer: Samantha Tressler

Area
  - Total: 1.05 sq mi (2.73 km^{2})
  - Land: 1.05 sq mi (2.73 km^{2})
  - Water: 0.0039 sq mi (0.01 km^{2})
- Elevation: 1,297 ft (395 m)

Population (2020)
  - Total: 469
  - Density: 445.6/sq mi (172.03/km^{2})
- Time zone: Eastern (EST)
  - Summer (DST): EDT
- ZIP code: 17747
- Area code: 570
- FIPS code: 42-44400
- Website: https://www.logantonborough.org/

Loganton is a borough in Clinton County, Pennsylvania, United States. The population was 469 at the 2020 census. Loganton is named after Chief James Logan.

== Geography ==
Loganton is located in southern Clinton County in the Sugar Valley, part of the Ridge-and-Valley Appalachians, and is situated at the northern base of Sugar Valley Mountain. Pennsylvania Route 477 and Pennsylvania Route 880 cross in the center of Loganton.

According to the United States Census Bureau, Loganton has a total area of 1.0 square mile (2.7 km^{2}), all land.

== History ==
In 1800, Sugar Valley (where Loganton is in) was part of Miles Township, Centre County. By 1819, Logan Township was formed out of Miles Township and all of Sugar Valley was called Logan Township, Centre County. In 1840, Clinton County was formed and that part that was Logan Township, Centre County was included in Clinton County. At this time, Logan Township, Clinton County was divided into two townships, Logan and Greene and Logansville was completely surrounded by Greene Township.

Dr. Caspar Wistar (1761-1818), celebrated Professor of Anatomy at the University of Pennsylvania in Philadelphia, was listed in 1790 as owning and having surveyed several thousand acres of “unseated lands” of what would later become part of Logansville. The portion of the Wistar tract of land on which Logansville eventually stood was bought by John Kleckner (who, in about 1800, built Sugar Valley’s earliest grist mill and a sawmill). He, in turn, passed the Wistar tract on to his son, Colonel Anthony Kleckner (1793-1860).

On the original survey maps the village was to be called Alpine but was officially called Logansville deriving its name from Logan Township and in turn was named after the Native American Indian, Chief James Logan, son of Chief Shikellamy.

== Demographics ==
Historical population
Census	Pop.	Note	%±
1850	243		—
1870	414		—
1880	423		2.2%
1890	385		−9.0%
1900	432		12.2%
1910	375		−13.2%
1920	254		−32.3%
1930	264		3.9%
1940	297		12.5%
1950	346		16.5%
1960	385		11.3%
1970	436		13.2%
1980	474		8.7%
1990	443		−6.5%
2000	435		−1.8%
2010	468		7.6%
2020	469		0.2%

As of the census of 2000, there were 435 people, 170 households, and 123 families residing in the borough. The population density was 411.7 inhabitants per square mile (159.0/km^{2}). There were 176 housing units at an average density of 166.6 per square mile (64.3/km^{2}). The racial makeup of the borough was 98.85% White, 0.23% African American, 0.69% Asian, and 0.23% from two or more races.

There were 170 households, out of which 29.4% had children under the age of 18 living with them, 62.4% were married couples living together, 7.6% had a female householder with no husband present, and 27.6% were non-families. 23.5% of all households were made up of individuals, and 14.1% had someone living alone who was 65 years of age or older. The average household size was 2.56 and the average family size was 2.98.

In the borough the population was spread out, with 23.0% under the age of 18, 6.4% from 18 to 24, 28.7% from 25 to 44, 24.8% from 45 to 64, and 17.0% who were 65 years of age or older. The median age was 40 years. For every 100 females there were 104.2 males. For every 100 females age 18 and over, there were 98.2 males.

The median income for a household in the borough was $38,250, and the median income for a family was $43,750. Males had a median income of $28,295 versus $19,688 for females. The per capita income for the borough was $16,773. About 3.6% of families and 4.4% of the population were below the poverty line, including 12.1% of those under age 18 and none of those age 65 or over.

== Government ==
- State Senate - District 25, Cris Dush (R)
- State House of Representatives - District 76, Stephanie Borowicz (R)
- U.S. House of Representatives - District 15, Glenn Thompson (R)
- U.S. Senate - John Fetterman (D), David McCormick (R)
