= Mount Nittany =

Mountain in Pennsylvania, United States

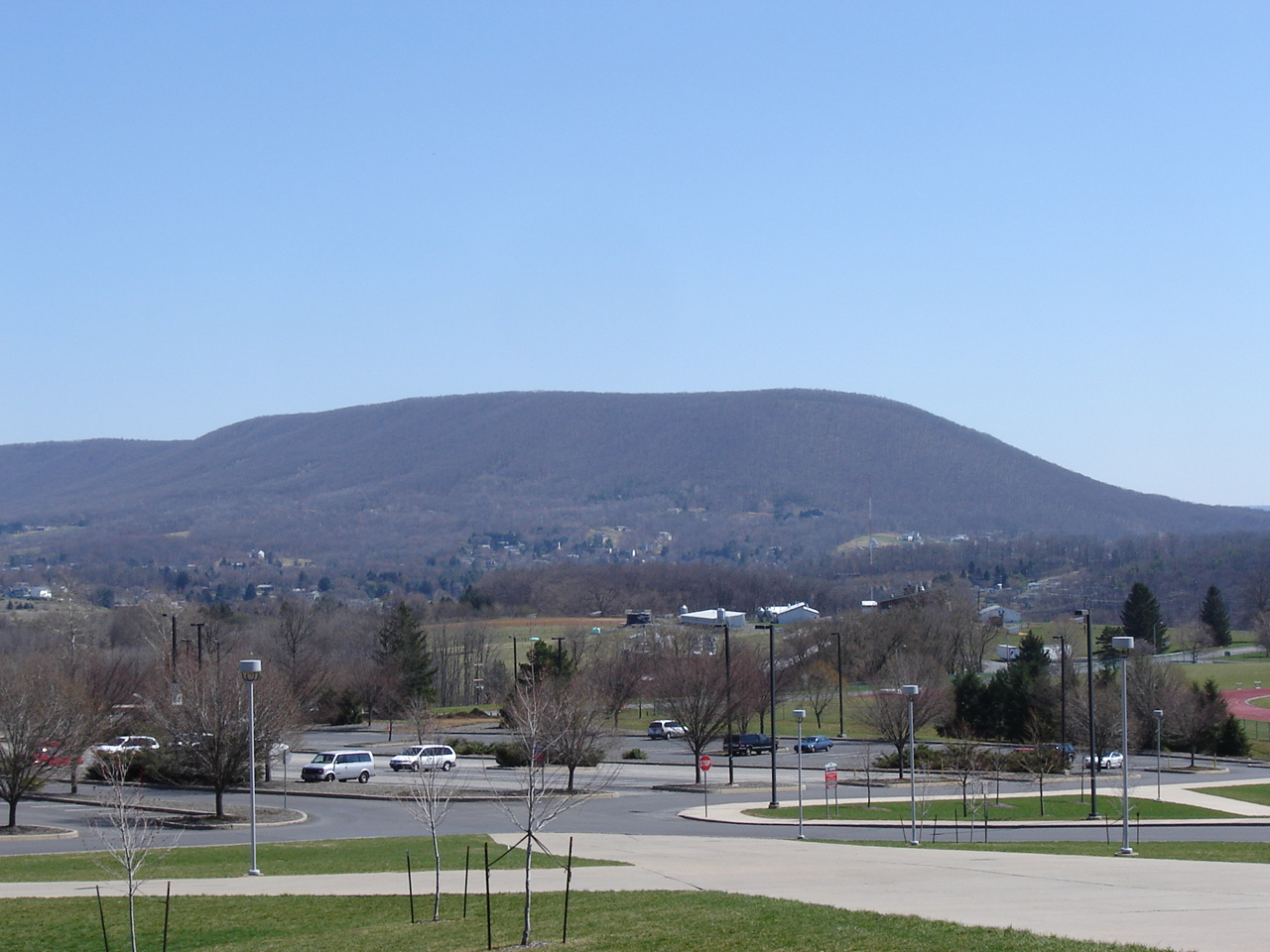
- Southern terminus of Mount Nittany ridge, looking east from the Bryce Jordan Center near State College, Pennsylvania

Highest point
- Elevation: 2,077 ft (633 m)
- Coordinates: 40°48′41″N 77°48′25″W

Geography
- Location: Centre County, Pennsylvania
- Parent range: Appalachian Mountains
- Topo map: USGS State College Quadrangle

Climbing
- Easiest route: White Trail

Nittany Mountain, commonly known as Mount Nittany, is a prominent geographic feature in Centre County, Pennsylvania. The mount is not a mountain but is part of a ridge that separates Nittany Valley from Penns Valley, with the enclosed Sugar Valley between them. On USGS topographic maps, Nittany Mount is generally too small to be considered a mountain and is shown as the lower ridge line that runs below Big Mountain on the west and Big Kettle Mountain on the east side, coming together to form a single ridge line at the southern terminus. This nomenclature is not always consistently applied to the same geologic formation, and there is a shorter Nittany Mountain ridge shown above the Sugar Valley as well.

Penn State University lies at the foot of Mount Nittany; the athletic teams and the mascot of the school, the Nittany Lion, are named for the mountain, as are Mount Nittany Elementary and Mount Nittany Middle School.

== Etymology ==
The word "Nittany" is derived from the Algonquian word Nit-A-Nee meaning "single mountain". According to Penn State folklore, Nit-A-Nee is also the name of a Native American maiden whose actions caused Mount Nittany to be formed. The original inhabitants of the area used Nit-A-Nee to describe the mountain, and it likely became commonly known as "Nittany" by the first Europeans to settle the area in the 18th century. The word "Nittany" was already in use by the time Pennsylvania State University was founded. Some sources cite the word Nit-A-Nee as meaning "barrier against the wind".

== History ==
In 1945, the landowners of Mount Nittany were preparing to sell the mountain, allegedly to use timber rights. The alumni of the Lion's Paw Senior Society who heard of this bought an option to buy the mountain. It took the Lion's Paw alumni until May 1946 to raise the money needed to make the purchase. In 1981, Lion's Paw established the Mount Nittany Conservancy, an organization intended to raise money from the general public in addition to the money raised by Lion's Paw members. Since its establishment, the Mount Nittany Conservancy has purchased hundreds of additional acres on Mount Nittany.

In 2013, Conserving Mount Nittany: A Dynamic Environmentalism, a book by Tom Shakely on the history of Mount Nittany and local conservation efforts, was published, incorporating histories of the mountain and valley.

== Geology ==
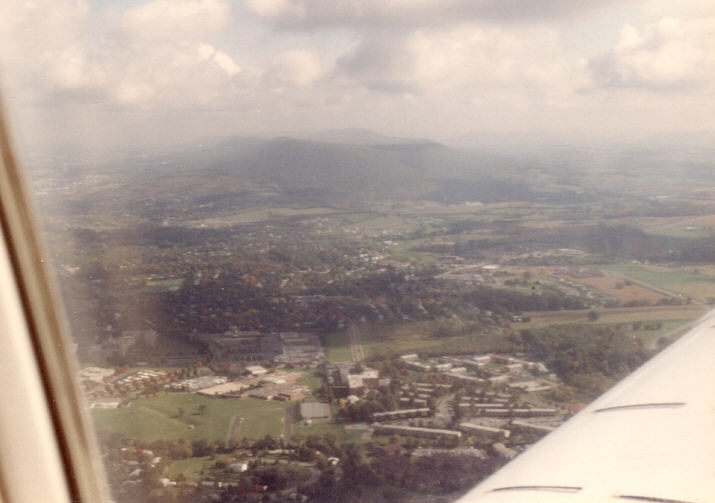
Aerial view of Mount Nittany as seen from State College

Mount Nittany is part of the Ridge and Valley province of the Appalachian Mountains. The neighboring Bald Eagle, Tussey and Shriner mountains are part of the same sedimentary formation, consisting of, from youngest to oldest, Tuscarora Formation quartzite, Juniata Formation shale, and Bald Eagle Formation sandstone. These layers were folded during the Appalachian orogeny.

Nittany Mountain is part of a synclinal depression of the anticlinal Nittany Arch, which originally formed a huge mountain, since eroded, that towered over what is now Nittany Valley. The present Nittany and Big Mountain ridges were originally a valley in this ancient mountain. The Nittany ridge line is topped by the erosion-resistant Bald Eagle Sandstone. The more durable Tuscarora Quartzite formations are found exposed on the higher ridges of the northern end of the same syncline: Big Mountain to "Riansares Mountain" and Big Kettle Mountain to "The Winehead". The more easily eroded Juniata Shale forms the depression between the lower and higher ridges, and the drainage from this area cut small ravines in the Nittany ridge line. The same three rock layers are exposed in the neighboring ridges.

Beneath the sedimentary layers is a formation of dolomite and limestone. The Bald Eagle Sandstone topping Mount Nittany prevents the erosion of the underlying limestone to the same level as the surrounding limestone valleys.
