= Bellefonte Area High School =

Coordinates: 40.91403°N 77.76082°W

Location
- 830 East Bishop Street; Bellefonte, (Centre County), Pennsylvania 16823; United States

Information
- Type: Public high school
- Principal: Michael Fedisson
- Staff: 63.33 (FTE)
- Enrollment: 844 (2023-24)
- Student to teacher ratio: 13.33
- Colors: Red and white
- Nickname: Red Raiders
- Website: Bellefonte Area High School

Bellefonte Area High School (previously known as Bellefonte High School) is a high school serving Bellefonte, Pennsylvania. It is a part of the Bellefonte Area School District.

The district (this is the sole comprehensive high school of the district) covers the Borough of Bellefonte and the townships of Marion, Spring, and Walker, as well as most of Benner Township, in Centre County, Pennsylvania. It includes the following census-designated places: Continental Courts, Hublersburg, Jacksonville, Mingoville, Nittany, Peru, Pleasant Gap, Snyderville, and Zion.

== Facilities ==
In 2011, several energy companies worked together to install a photovoltaic solar array on the roof of Bellefonte Area High School.

== Notable people ==
Bellefonte has graduated several figures notable on the state level. Anna Keichline, Pennsylvania's first female architect, graduated from Bellefonte High School in 1906. Pennsylvania's 21st governor, Daniel H. Hastings, served as principal of the school in the late 1860s.

Jeremy Rose was a top wrestler at Bellefonte High before he went on to be a horse jockey. He and his horse, Afleet Alex, won the Belmont Stakes and Preakness Stakes in 2005, receiving the Best Jockey ESPY Award that year.
