= Bellefonte Airport =

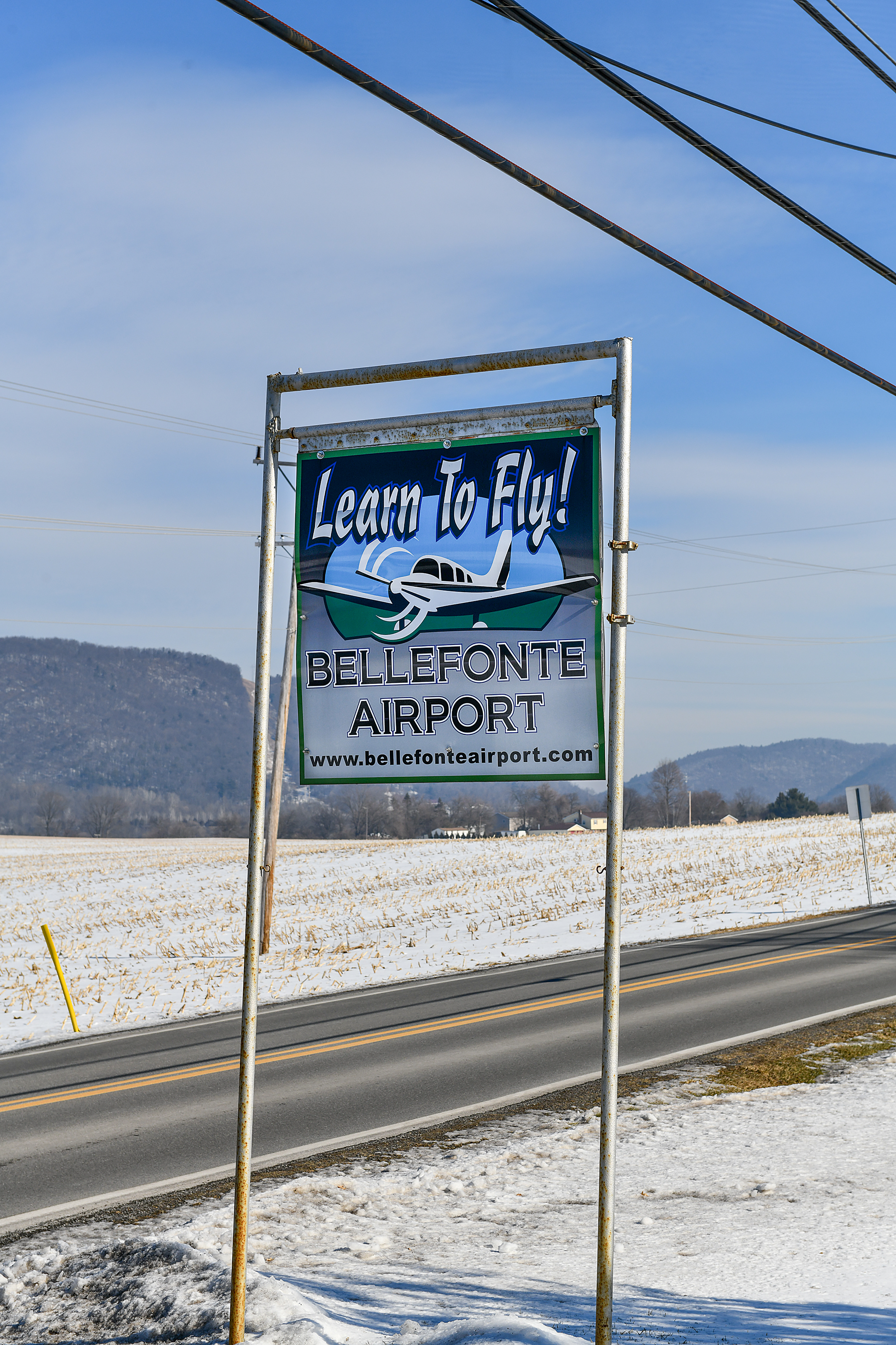
- IATA: none; ICAO: none; FAA LID: N96

Summary
- Airport type: Private
- Serves: Bellefonte, Pennsylvania
- Location: Benner Township, Pennsylvania
- Elevation AMSL: 1,071 ft (326 m)
- Coordinates: 40°53′08″N 077°48′58″W

Map
- Location within Pennsylvania Location within the United States

Runways
Direction	Length		Surface
Direction	ft	m	Surface
7/25	3,632	1,107	Asphalt

Helipads
Number	Length		Surface
Number	ft	m	Surface
H1	50 x 50	15 × 15	Concrete

Statistics (2016)
- Based aircraft: 23

Bellefonte Airport (FAA LID N96) is a privately owned and operated airport in Benner Township, Pennsylvania, with a Bellefonte post office address.

It serves as a general aviation airport in the State College metropolitan area.

== History ==
Bellefonte Airport was founded in 1971 by Robert Elnitski as a private airfield, and other than short periods in the 1990s has been a private airport since. It sits just over three miles from State College Regional Airport which serves as the major airport for Centre County.

== See also ==
- List of airports in Pennsylvania
- Aviation in Pennsylvania
