= Continental Courts, Pennsylvania =

Unincorporated community in Pennsylvania, US

- Census-designated place
- Location within Pennsylvania Location within the United States
- Coordinates: 40°52′16″N 77°52′0″W
- Country: United States
- State: Pennsylvania
- County: Centre
- Township: Benner

Area
  - Total: 0.29 sq mi (0.75 km^{2})
  - Land: 0.29 sq mi (0.75 km^{2})
  - Water: 0 sq mi (0.00 km^{2})
- Elevation: 1,040 ft (320 m)

Population (2020)
  - Total: 705
  - Density: 2,442.0/sq mi (942.85/km^{2})
- Time zone: UTC-5 (Eastern (EST))
  - Summer (DST): UTC-4 (EDT)
- ZIP Code: 16823 (Bellefonte)
- Area codes: 814/582
- FIPS code: 42-15860
- GNIS feature ID: 2805477

Continental Courts is a mobile home park and census-designated place (CDP) in Centre County, Pennsylvania, United States. It was first listed as a CDP prior to the 2020 census.

The CDP is in central Centre County, in the west part of Benner Township. It is bordered to the south by Pennsylvania Route 550, which leads northeast 6 miles (10 km) to Bellefonte, the county seat, and southwest 10 miles (16 km) to Stormstown. State College is 7 miles (11 km) to the south via local roads.

The community is in the valley of Buffalo Run, which flows northeast to Spring Creek at Bellefonte and is part of the Bald Eagle Creek watershed leading to the West Branch Susquehanna River. Bald Eagle Mountain rises 700 feet (210 m) above the community to the northwest.

== Demographics ==
Historical population
Census	Pop.	Note	%±
2020	705		—
U.S. Decennial Census

== Education ==
The CDP is in Bellefonte Area School District. Bellefonte Area High School is the district's comprehensive high school.
