= Brockerhoff Hotel =

- U.S. National Register of Historic Places
- U.S. Historic district – Contributing property
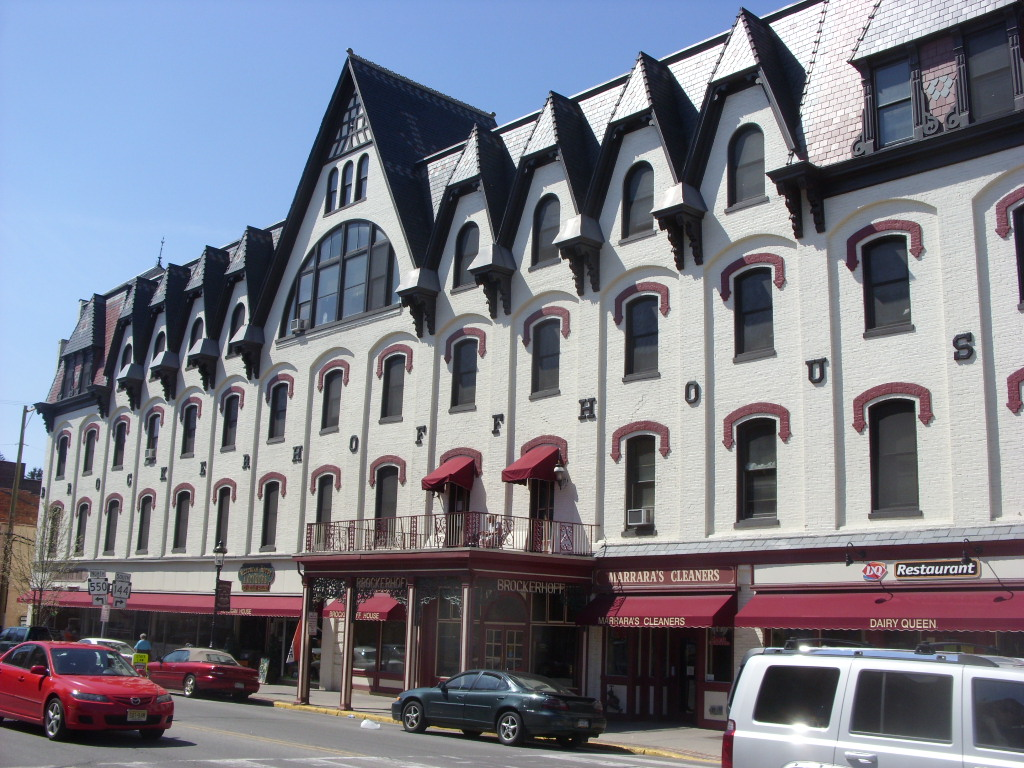
- Brockerhoff Hotel, April 2009

- Location within Pennsylvania Location within the United States
- Map showing the location of Brockerhoff Hotel
- Location: High and Allegheny Sts., Bellefonte, Pennsylvania
- Coordinates: 40°54′42″N 77°46′42″W
- Area: 0.3 acres (0.12 ha)
- Built: 1866
- Architectural style: Second Empire, Italianate, Queen Anne
- NRHP reference No.: 77001137
- Added to NRHP: April 11, 1977

Brockerhoff Hotel is a historic hotel located at Bellefonte, Centre County, Pennsylvania. It was built in 1866, and is a large brick building on a stone foundation, measuring 170 feet by 60 feet. The original building was executed in the Italianate style. It was renovated in the 1880s to have a mansard roof in a combined Second Empire / Queen Anne style. The roof features multicolored slate. The building was built by Henry Brockerhoff (1794-1878), who also built the Brockerhoff Mill.

It was added to the National Register of Historic Places on April 11, 1977. It is located in the Bellefonte Historic District.

== See also ==
- Contributing property
- Cultural landscape
- Historic preservation
- Keeper of the Register
- List of heritage registers
- Property type (National Register of Historic Places)
- United States National Register of Historic Places listings
- State Historic Preservation Office
