= Brockerhoff Mill =

- U.S. National Register of Historic Places
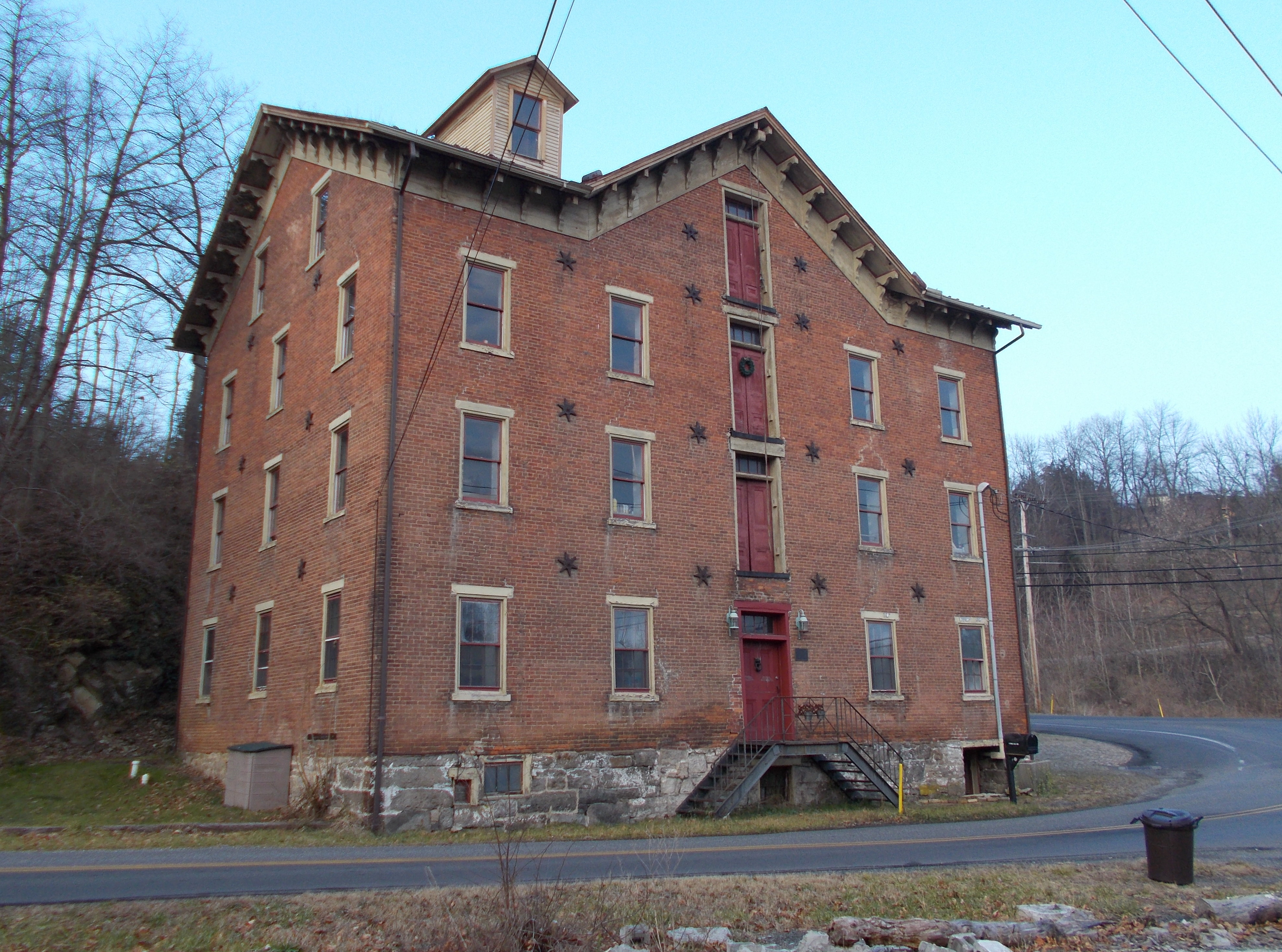
- Brockerhoff Mill in December 2012

- Location within Pennsylvania Location within the United States
- Nearest city: Southwest of Bellefonte on Pennsylvania Route 550, Benner Township, Pennsylvania, U.S.
- Coordinates: 40°54′1″N 77°47′58″W
- Area: 1.8 acres (0.73 ha)
- Built: 1862
- NRHP reference No.: 79002180
- Added to NRHP: May 1, 1979

Brockerhoff Mill, also known as Roopsburg Mill, is a historic grist mill located at Benner Township, Centre County, Pennsylvania. It was built about 1862, and is a four-story brick building on a limestone foundation. It measures 56 feet by 40 feet, and has a gable roof. Also on the property are the remains of the mill race. The mill was built by Henry Brockerhoff (1794-1878), who also built the Brockerhoff Hotel.

It was added to the National Register of Historic Places in 1979.
