= Fishermans Paradise, Pennsylvania =

Fishermans Paradise
- Location within Pennsylvania
- Coordinates: 40°52′50″N 77°47′34″W
- Country: United States
- State: Pennsylvania
- County: Centre
- Township: Benner
- Elevation: 830 ft (250 m)
- Time zone: UTC-5 (Eastern (EST))
  - Summer (DST): UTC-4 (EDT)
- GNIS feature ID: 1203572

Fishermans Paradise is a hamlet in Benner Township Centre County, Pennsylvania, United States. It is part of the Nittany Valley.

Fishermans Paradise is located on the east bank of Spring Creek. The Bellefonte Fish Culture Station is located on the west bank.

The area is noted for its fishing, and Spring Creek contains high concentrations of wild brown trout at this location. Fishermans Paradise once had a "ladies only" fishing area.
