= Jacksonville, Centre County, Pennsylvania =

Unincorporated community in Pennsylvania, US

Jacksonville, Pennsylvania
- Census-designated place
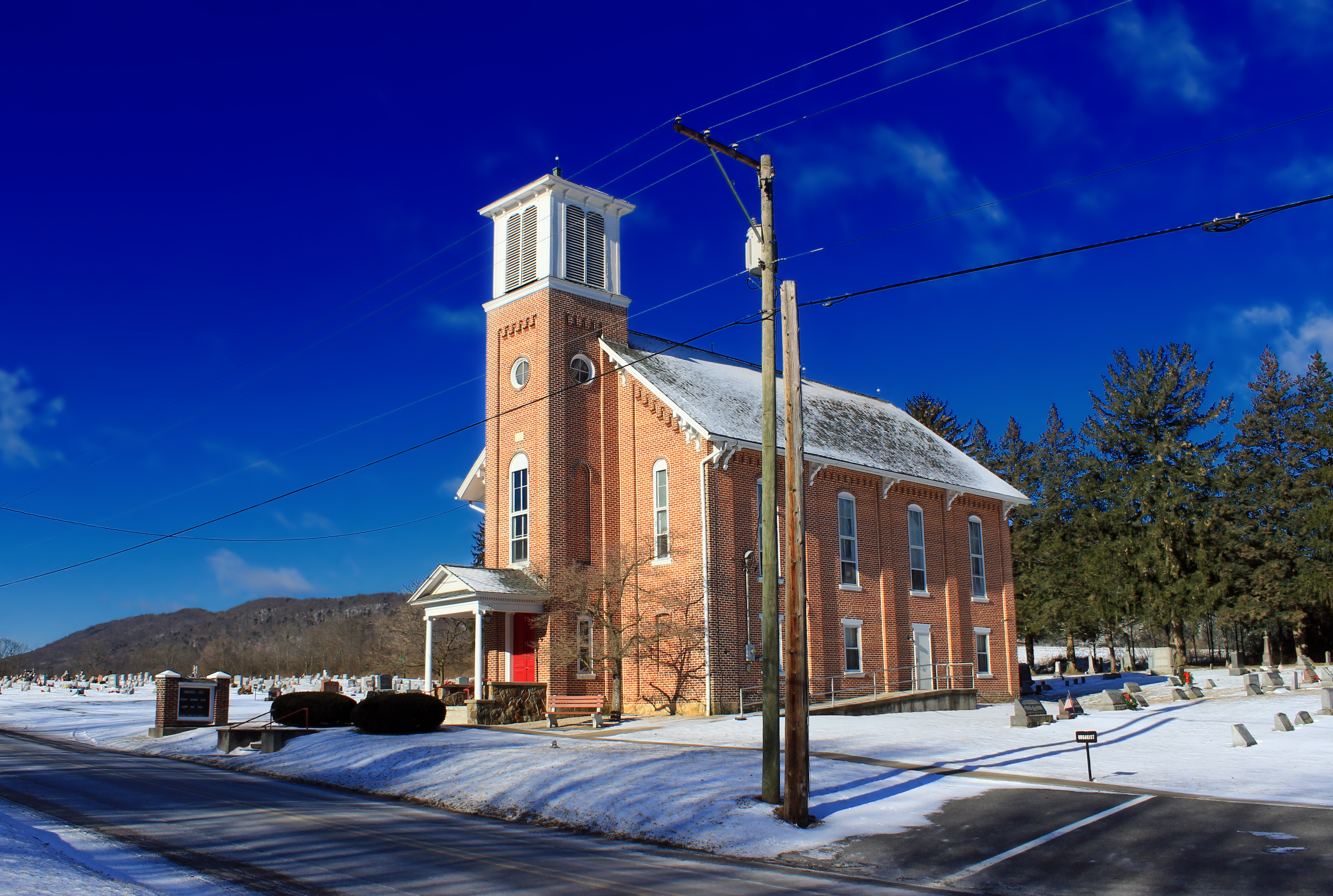
- Emmanuel United Church of Christ

- Map showing Centre County in Pennsylvania

- Location within Pennsylvania Location within the United States
- Coordinates: 40°59′32″N 77°37′55″W
- Country: United States
- State: Pennsylvania
- County: Centre
- Township: Marion

Area
  - Total: 0.14 sq mi (0.37 km^{2})
  - Land: 0.14 sq mi (0.37 km^{2})
  - Water: 0 sq mi (0.0 km^{2})
- Elevation: 902 ft (275 m)

Population (2010)
  - Total: 95
  - Density: 668/sq mi (258.1/km^{2})
- Time zone: UTC-5 (Eastern (EST))
  - Summer (DST): UTC-4 (EDT)
- FIPS code: 42-37545
- GNIS feature ID: 2584473

Jacksonville is an unincorporated American community and census-designated place that is located in Marion Township, Centre County, Pennsylvania.

As of the 2010 census, the population was 95 residents.

== History and geography ==
The town is located in the Little Nittany Valley, 10 miles (16 km) northeast of Bellefonte, the Centre County seat.

Howard Gap in Bald Eagle Mountain is located just to the northwest of the town. Pennsylvania Route 26 passes through the gap, leading 2.5 miles (4.0 km) to the borough of Howard. Interstate 80 passes through the Little Nittany Valley just southeast of Jacksonville. Newly added Exit 163 serves Jacksonville and Howard.

== Education ==
The CDP is in Bellefonte Area School District.

== Gallery ==
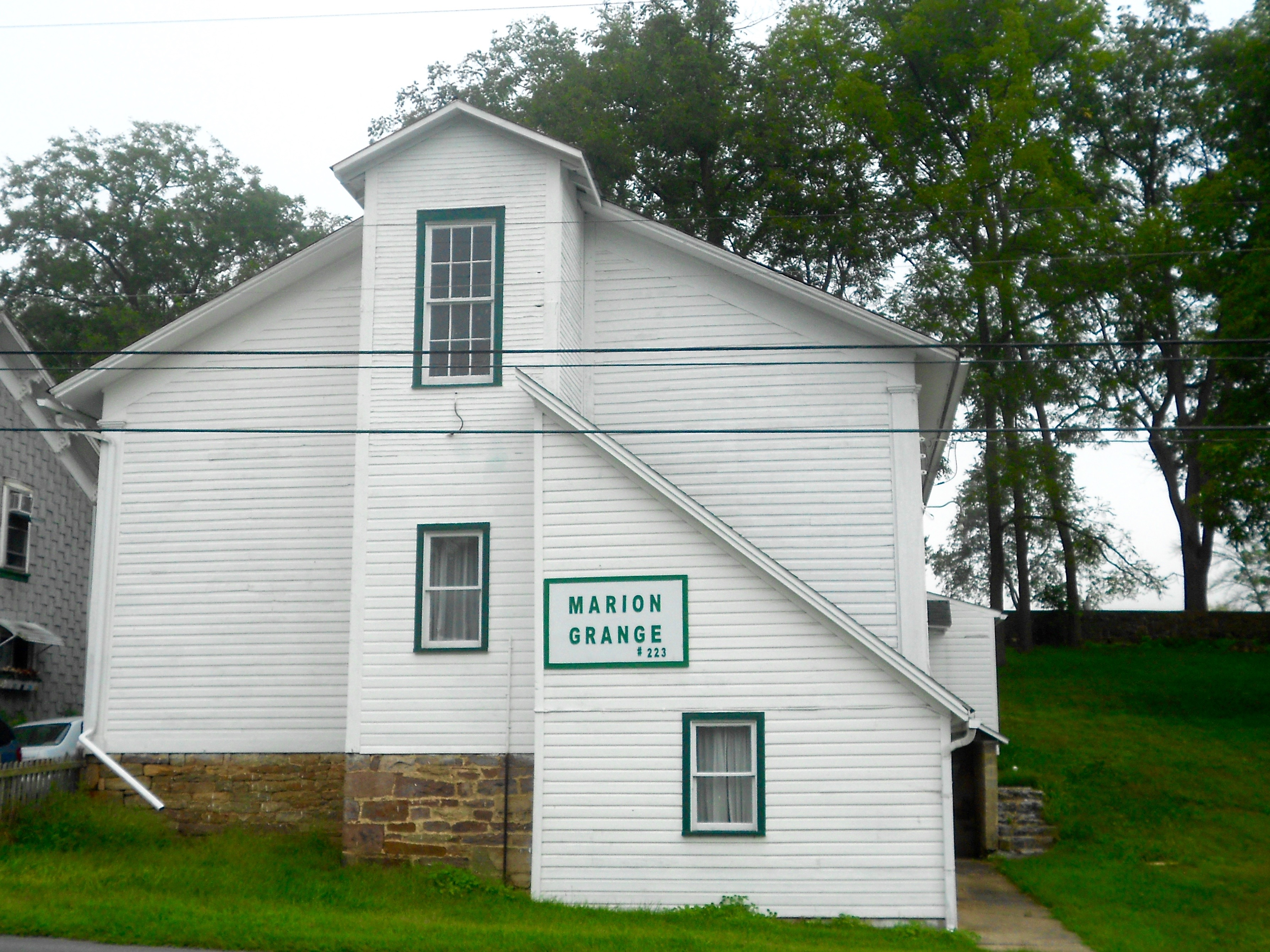
Grange
