= Benner Township, Pennsylvania =

Township in Pennsylvania, US

Coordinates: 40°54′48″N 77°45′53″W

- Township
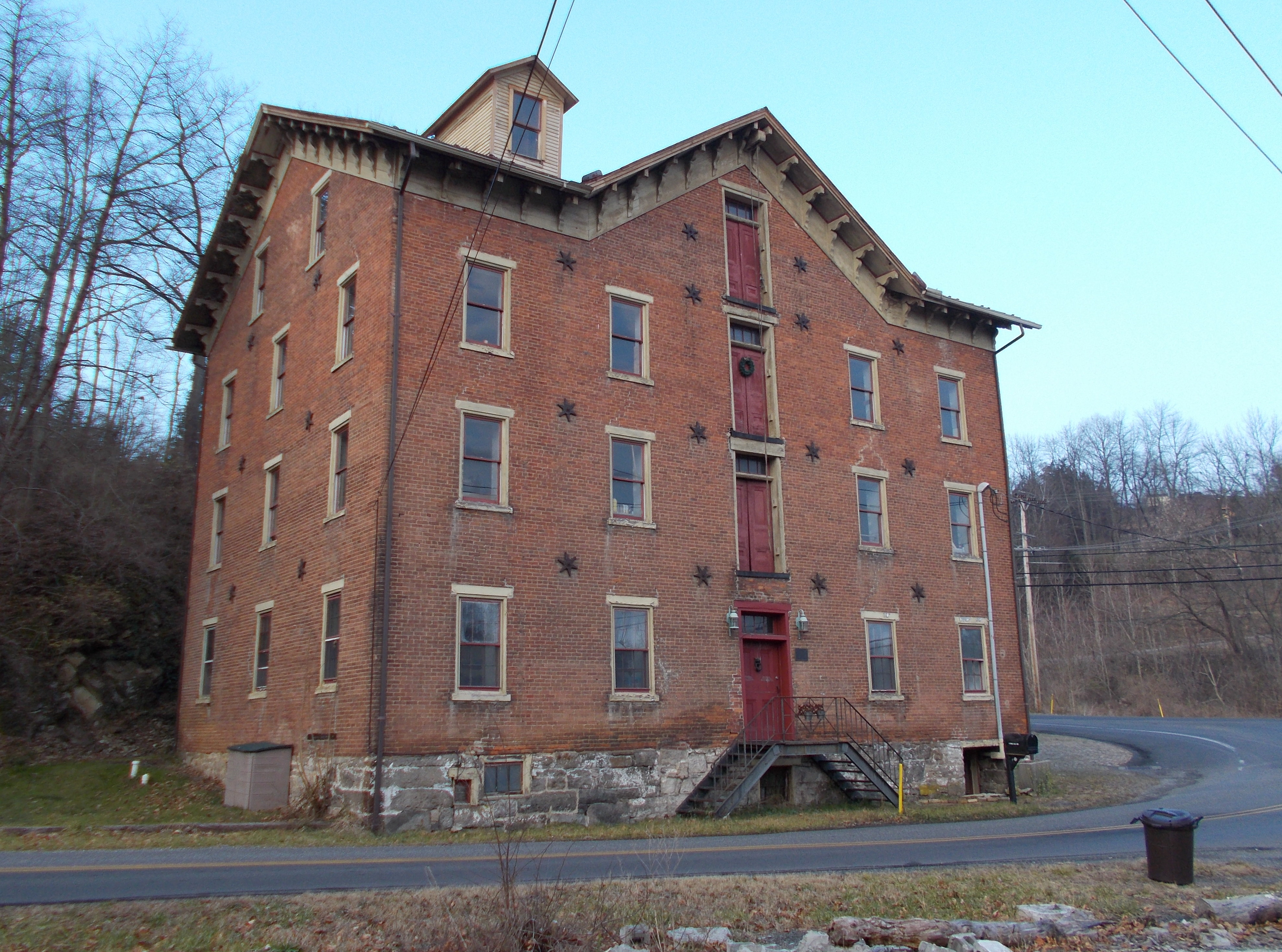
- Brockerhoff Mill

- Logo

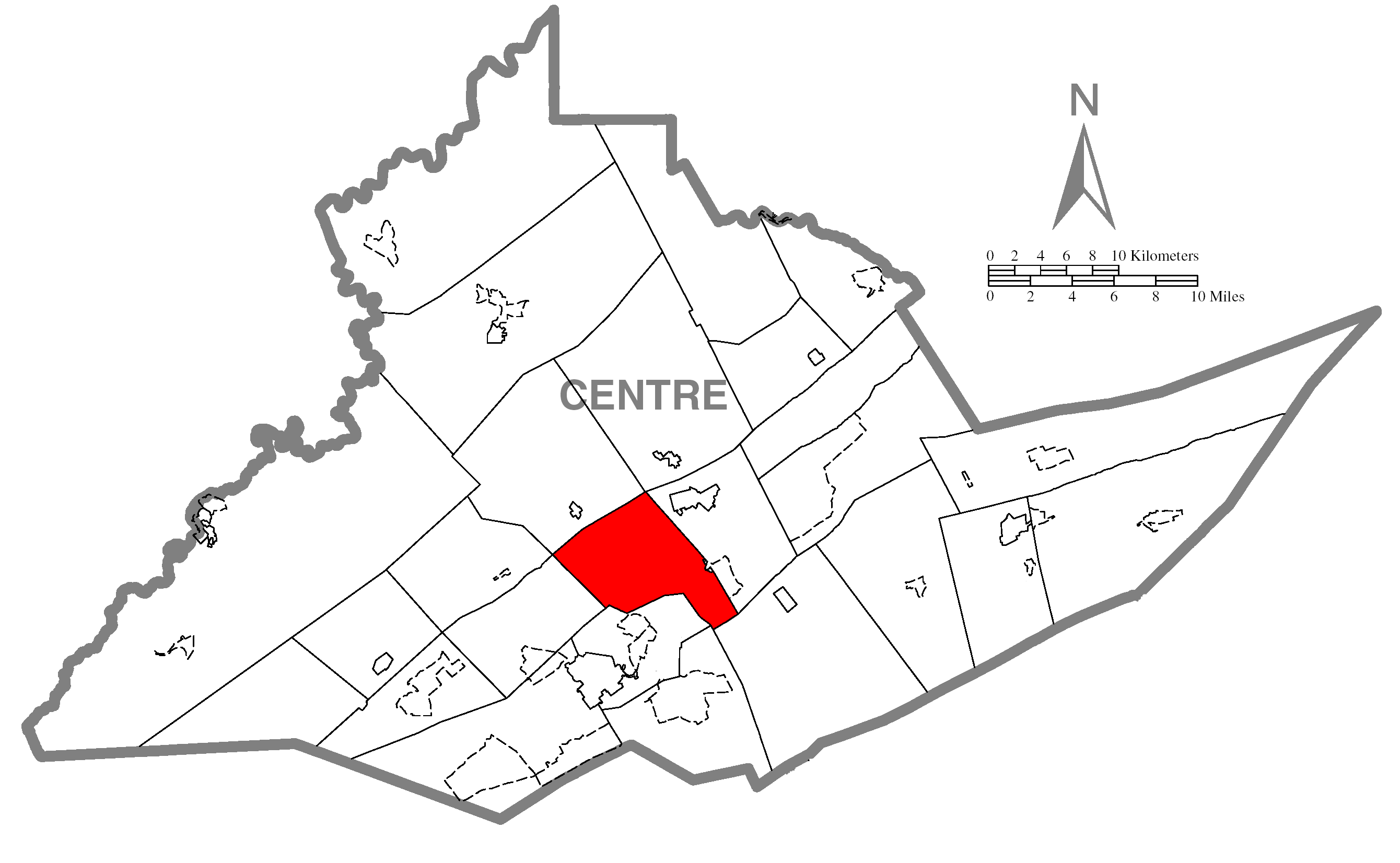
- Map of Centre County, Pennsylvania highlighting Benner Township

- Map of Centre County, Pennsylvania
- Country: United States
- State: Pennsylvania
- County: Centre
- Settled: 1793
- Incorporated: 1853

Government
  - Type: Board of Supervisors
  - Chair: Randy Moyer
  - Vice-chair: David Wise
  - Supervisor: Mark J. Capriani
  - Auditor: Rory Spangler
  - Auditor: Thomas Strouse

Area
  - Total: 28.36 sq mi (73.44 km^{2})
  - Land: 28.36 sq mi (73.44 km^{2})
  - Water: 0 sq mi (0.00 km^{2})

Population (2020)
  - Total: 8,964
  - Density: 324.8/sq mi (125.39/km^{2})
- Time zone: UTC-5 (EST)
  - Summer (DST): UTC-4 (EDT)
- FIPS code: 42-027-05608
- Website: Township website

Historical population
Census	Pop.	Note	%±
2000	5,217		—
2010	6,188		18.6%
2020	8,964		44.9%
U.S. Decennial Census

Benner Township is a township in Centre County, Pennsylvania, United States. It is part of the State College, Pennsylvania Metropolitan Statistical Area. It is located approximately at along Buffalo Run Road (Pennsylvania Route 550), near Bellefonte.

The population was 8,964 at the 2020 census, which is an 44.9% increase over the 6.188 recorded in 2010.

== History ==
Benner Township was settled in 1793 with the establishment of an iron furnace. It is named for General Phillip Benner who built the furnace along Spring Creek near the settlement of Rock. Benner built a nail mill and slitting mill in the area as well.

Buffalo were seen in the area as late as 1769. Other wild game that inhabited the area prior to settlement were bears, gray wolves and cougars. It is noted that these three animals were so abundant in the area that men dared not venture into the woods after dark.

The Brockerhoff Mill was added to the National Register of Historic Places in 1979.

== Geography ==
According to the United States Census Bureau, the township has a total area of 28.5 square miles (74 km^{2}), all land.

Benner Township is bordered by Spring Township to the northeast, College Township to the south, Patton Township to the southwest and Union Township to the northwest. There are three census-designated places in the township, Continental Courts and Peru, and a portion of Pleasant Gap. The township is home to the communities of Chemical, Fillmore, and Fishermans Paradise.

== Demographics ==
As of the census of 2010, there were 6,188 people, 1,612 households, and 1,095 families residing in the township. The population density was 217.1 inhabitants per square mile (83.8/km^{2}). There were 1,759 housing units at an average density of 61.7/sq mi (23.8/km^{2}). The racial makeup of the township was 78.8% White, 16.2% Black or African American, 0.1% Native American, 0.4% Asian, 0.1% Pacific Islander, 3.6% from other races, and 0.8% from two or more races. Hispanic or Latino of any race were 4.2% of the population.

There were 1,612 households, out of which 28.2% had children under the age of 18 living with them, 56.5% were married couples living together, 4.0% had a male householder with no wife present, 7.4% had a female householder with no husband present, and 32.1% were non-families. 26.2% of all households were made up of individuals, and 8.3% had someone living alone who was 65 years of age or older. The average household size was 2.38 and the average family size was 2.88.

In the township the population was spread out, with 13.3% under the age of 18, 8.9% from 18 to 24, 38.7% from 25 to 44, 29.2% from 45 to 64, and 9.9% who were 65 years of age or older. The median age was 40 years. For every 100 females there were 218.8 males. For every 100 females age 18 and over, there were 245.4 males.

The median income for a household in the township was $54,566, and the median income for a family was $67,687. The per capita income for the township was $24,092. About 2.6% of families and 5.4% of the population were below the poverty line, including 9.6% of those under age 18 and 11.0% of those age 65 or over.

== Government and infrastructure ==
State Correctional Institution – Rockview is mostly located in Benner Township. It houses the state execution chamber. Also located in Benner Township are State Correctional Institution - Benner Township, which was constructed adjacent to SCI Rockview in the early 2010s, the Centre County Correctional Facility, and Pennsylvania State Police Troop G Rockview Station.

== Transportation ==
Bellefonte Airport and State College Regional Airport (formerly University Park Airport) are in the township.

== Education ==
Most of the township is in Bellefonte Area School District, while a section is in the State College Area School District.
