= Bellefonte Area School District =

School district in Pennsylvania

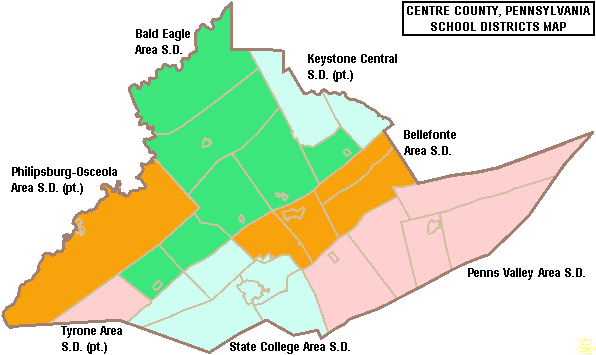

Address
- 318 North Allegheny Street Bellefonte, Centre County, Pennsylvania, 15010; United States

Other information
- Website: http://www.basd.net/

The Bellefonte Area School District is a midsized, rural, public school district in Centre County, Pennsylvania.

The district covers the Borough of Bellefonte and the townships of Marion, Spring, and Walker, as well as most of Benner Township, in Centre County, Pennsylvania. It includes the following census-designated places: Continental Courts, Hublersburg, Jacksonville, Mingoville, Nittany, Peru, Pleasant Gap, Snyderville, and Zion.

Bellefonte Area School District encompasses approximately 115 square miles (300 km^{2}). According to 2000 federal census data, it served a resident population of 21,480. By 2010, the district's population increased to 25,351 people. In 2009, the district residents' per capita income was $18,308 a year, while the median family income was $46,786.

== Schools ==
=== Secondary ===
- Bellefonte Area High School (Grades 9-12)
- Bellefonte Area Middle School (Grades 6-8)

=== Elementary ===
All Elementary Schools are Grades K-5.

- Bellefonte Elementary School
- Benner Elementary School
- Marion Walker Elementary School
- Pleasant Gap Elementary School

== Mascot ==
The mascot for the Bellefonte Area School District has been the Red Raider, a Native American, since 1936. In 2015, the district made its primary logo a red "B", while the red, headdressed Native American was made a secondary logo. A petition to replace the mascot was started in June 2020 following the George Floyd protests. On Tuesday, April 13, 2021, the Bellefonte Area School District Board of Directors voted by a vote of 8-1 to retire the “Red Raider” logo after hearing from two dozen community members in support of the change.

== Extracurriculars ==
The district provides a wide variety of clubs, activities and interscholastic sports.

=== Athletics ===
The district funds:

Boys:

- Baseball – AAAA, 2016 PIAA AAA State Champions
- Basketball- AAA
- Bowling – AAAA
- Cross Country – AA
- Football – AAA
- Golf – AAA
- Lacrosse – AA (club)
- Soccer – AA
- Swimming and Diving – AA
- Track and Field – AAA
- Wrestling – AAA

Girls:

- Basketball – AAA
- Bowling – AAAA
- Cheer – AAAA
- Cross Country – AA
- Golf – AAA
- Gymnastics – AAAA
- Lacrosse – AAAA
- Soccer (Fall) – AA
- Softball – AAA 2010 PIAA State Champions
- Swimming and Diving – AA
- Track and Field – AAA
- Volleyball – AA

Middle School sports:

Boys:

- Basketball
- Football
- Soccer
- Wrestling
- Lacrosse

Girls:

- Basketball
- Cheer
- Softball
- Soccer
- Lacrosse

According to PIAA directory July 2013
