= Peru, Pennsylvania =

Unincorporated community in Pennsylvania, US

- Unincorporated community
- Location within Pennsylvania
- Coordinates: 40°51′17″N 77°46′00″W
- Country: United States
- State: Pennsylvania
- County: Centre
- Township: Benner

Area
  - Total: 0.035 sq mi (0.09 km^{2})
  - Land: 0.035 sq mi (0.09 km^{2})
  - Water: 0 sq mi (0.00 km^{2})

Population (2020)
  - Total: 26
  - Density: 779.5/sq mi (300.97/km^{2})
- Demonym: Peruvian
- Time zone: Eastern (EST)
  - Summer (DST): EDT
- Area code: 814
- FIPS code: 42-59580

Peru is an unincorporated community in Benner Township, Centre County, Pennsylvania, United States. Peru is alternatively known unofficially as Lauvertown. Peru is located northeast of State College and southwest of Pleasant Gap along Pennsylvania Route 26 near the Pennsylvania State Correctional Institution at Rockview.

== Demographics ==
Historical population
Census	Pop.	Note	%±
2020	26		—
U.S. Decennial Census

== Education ==
The CDP is in Bellefonte Area School District.
