= Mingoville, Pennsylvania =

Unincorporated community in Pennsylvania, US

- Census-designated place
- Map showing Centre County in Pennsylvania

- Location in Pennsylvania Mingoville (the United States)
- Coordinates: 40°55′56″N 77°38′52″W
- Country: United States
- State: Pennsylvania
- County: Centre
- Township: Walker

Area
  - Total: 1.83 sq mi (4.74 km^{2})
  - Land: 1.83 sq mi (4.74 km^{2})
  - Water: 0 sq mi (0.00 km^{2})
- Elevation: 1,035 ft (315 m)

Population (2020)
  - Total: 527
  - Density: 287.8/sq mi (111.12/km^{2})
- Time zone: UTC-5 (Eastern (EST))
  - Summer (DST): UTC-4 (EDT)
- ZIP code: 16856
- FIPS code: 42-50104
- GNIS feature ID: 1181335

Mingoville is an unincorporated community and census-designated place (CDP) in Walker Township, Centre County, Pennsylvania, United States. As of the 2010 census, the population was 503 residents.

Mingoville is located in eastern Centre County, west of the center of Walker Township, in the Nittany Valley between Nittany Mountain to the southeast and Sand Ridge to the northwest. It is 3 miles (5 km) southwest of the community of Hublersburg and 2 miles (3 km) northeast of Zion, along Pennsylvania Route 64. State College is 15 miles (24 km) to the southwest.

Mingoville lies on Logan's Path and was named after Logan, a Cayuga orator affiliated with the Mingo tribe.

== Demographics ==
Historical population
Census	Pop.	Note	%±
2020	527		—
U.S. Decennial Census

== Education ==
The CDP is in Bellefonte Area School District.
