= Pleasant Gap, Pennsylvania =

Unincorporated community in Pennsylvania, US

- Census-designated place
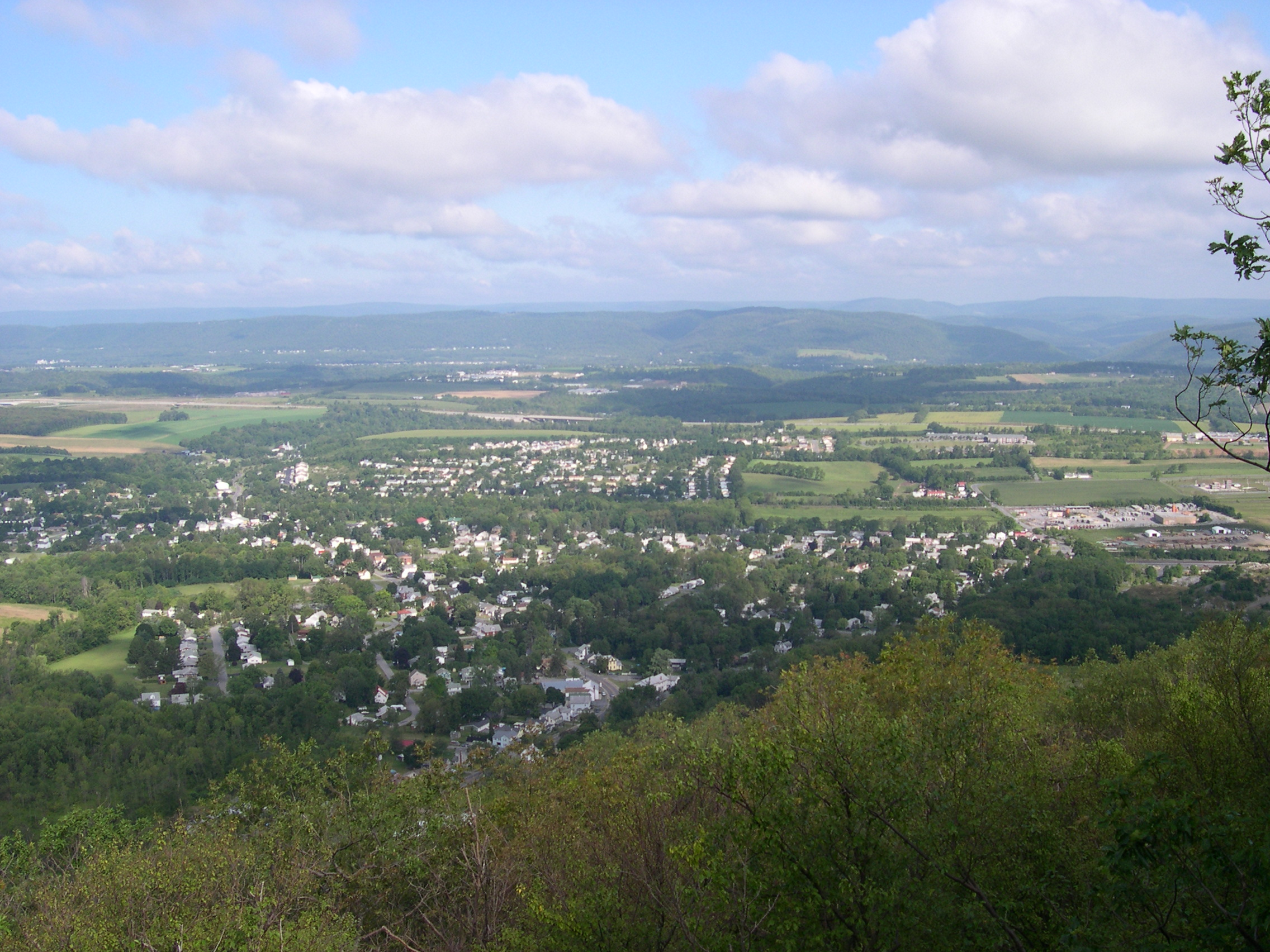
- Pleasant Gap as seen from Big Rock

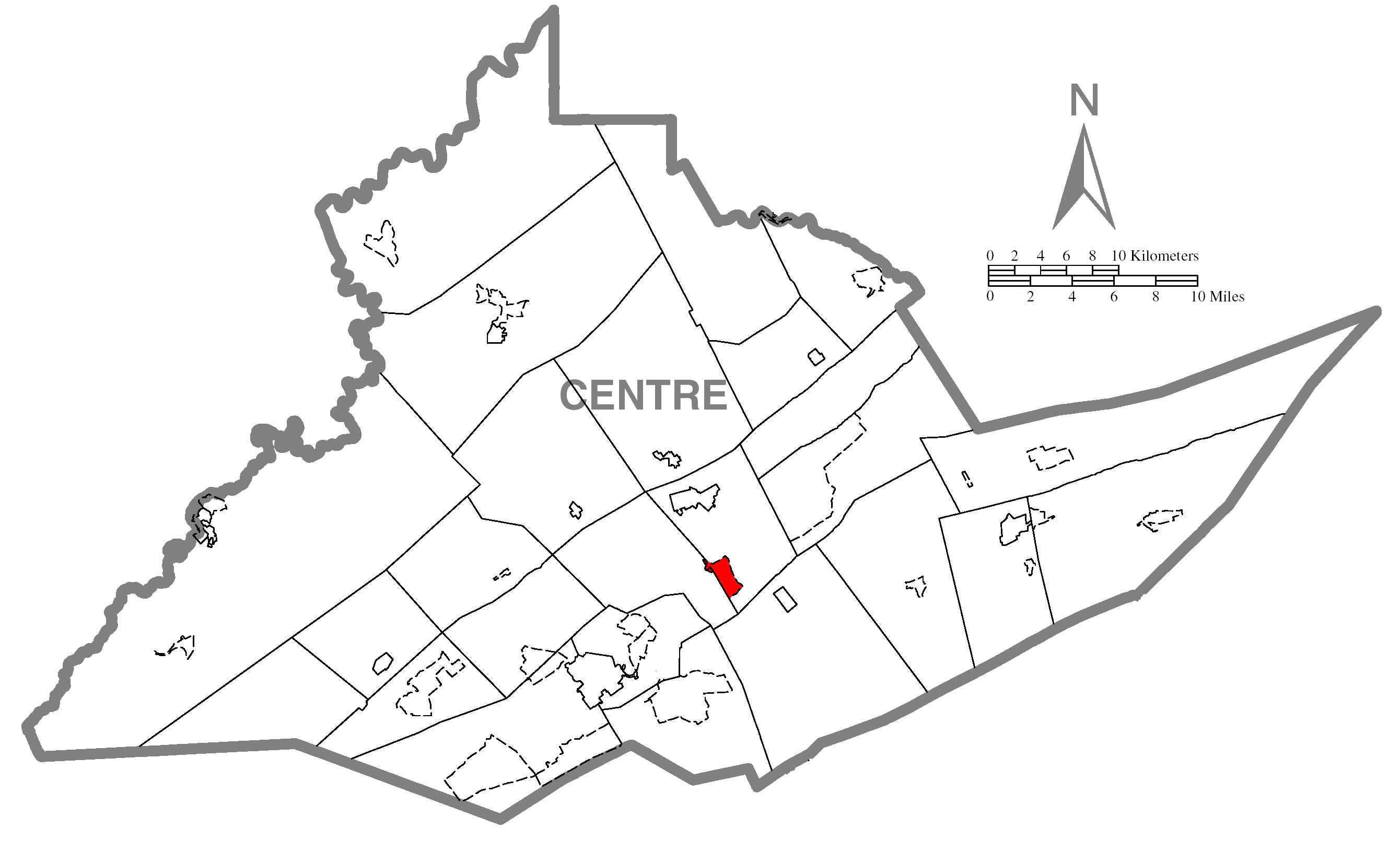
- Location within Centre County

- Location within the U.S. state of Pennsylvania Pleasant Gap (the United States)
- Coordinates: 40°52′1″N 77°44′37″W
- Country: United States
- State: Pennsylvania
- County: Centre
- Townships: Spring, Benner

Area
  - Total: 1.59 sq mi (4.13 km^{2})
  - Land: 1.59 sq mi (4.13 km^{2})
  - Water: 0 sq mi (0.00 km^{2})
- Elevation: 1,020 ft (310 m)

Population (2020)
  - Total: 2,945
  - Density: 1,846.2/sq mi (712.81/km^{2})
- Time zone: UTC-5 (Eastern (EST))
  - Summer (DST): UTC-4 (EDT)
- ZIP code: 16823
- Area code: 814
- FIPS code: 42-61232
- GNIS code: 1184007

Pleasant Gap is an unincorporated community and census-designated place (CDP) in Centre County, Pennsylvania, United States. It is part of the State College, Pennsylvania Metropolitan Statistical Area. The population was 2,879 at the 2010 census.

== Geography ==
Pleasant Gap is located south of the center of Centre County at 40°52′1″N 77°44′37″W (40.866926, -77.743539). It is primarily in southern Spring Township, with a small portion extending west into Benner Township. The community is located in the Nittany Valley, along the northwestern base of Nittany Mountain. Gap Run flows off the mountain through the physical Pleasant Gap and continues through the town, entering the Logan Branch, a northward-flowing tributary of Spring Creek, on the northwestern side of town.

According to the United States Census Bureau, the Pleasant Gap CDP has a total area of 1.63 square miles (4.21 km^{2}), all land.

== Demographics ==
Historical population
Census	Pop.	Note	%±
2020	2,945		—
U.S. Decennial Census

As of the census of 2010, there were 2,879 people, 1,198 households, and 794 families residing in the CDP. The population density was 1,818.7 inhabitants per square mile (702.2/km^{2}). There were 1,238 housing units at an average density of 782.1/sq mi (302.0/km^{2}). The racial makeup of the CDP was 95.7% White, 1.9% Black or African American, 0.2% Native American, 1.0% Asian, and 1.2% from two or more races. Hispanic or Latino of any race were 0.8% of the population.

There were 1,198 households, out of which 31.2% had children under the age of 18 living with them, 51.8% were married couples living together, 4.3% had a male householder with no wife present, 10.2% had a female householder with no husband present, and 33.7% were non-families. 27.4% of all households were made up of individuals, and 9.2% had someone living alone who was 65 years of age or older. The average household size was 2.40 and the average family size was 2.93.

In the CDP, the population was spread out, with 23.9% under the age of 18, 6.7% from 18 to 24, 32.0% from 25 to 44, 25.2% from 45 to 64, and 12.2% who were 65 years of age or older. The median age was 37 years. For every 100 females, there were 96.1 males. For every 100 females age 18 and over, there were 94.1 males.

The median income for a household in the CDP was $49,728, and the median income for a family was $73,224. The per capita income for the CDP was $25,350. About 3.1% of families and 4.9% of the population were below the poverty line, including 7.2% of those under age 18 and 2.5% of those age 65 or over.

== Education ==
The CDP is in Bellefonte Area School District.

== Images ==
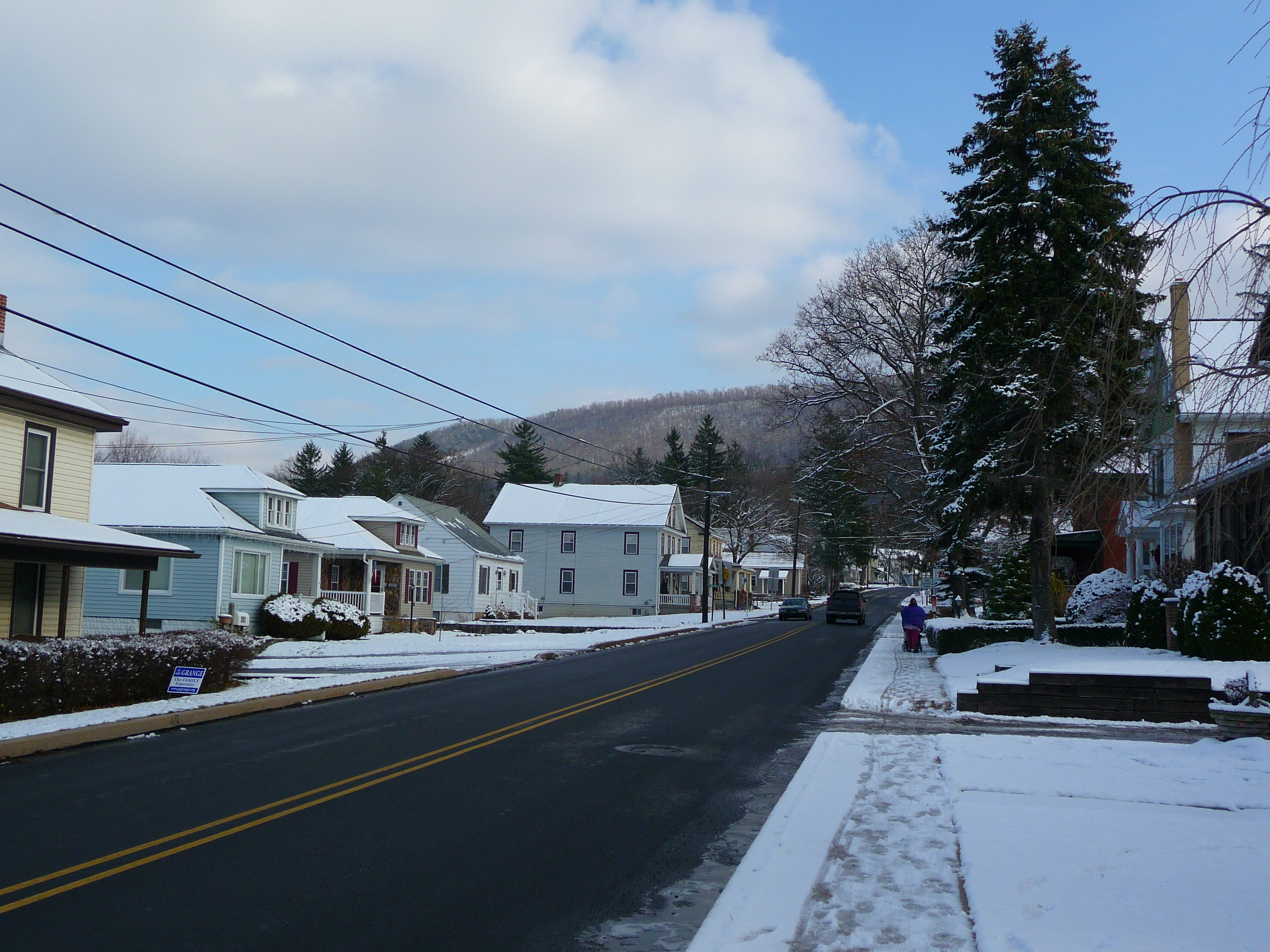
Main Street (PA 144) - Looking southbound toward Mount Nittany
