= Hublersburg, Pennsylvania =

Unincorporated community in Pennsylvania, US

- Census-designated place
- Map showing Centre County in Pennsylvania

- Location in Pennsylvania Hublersburg (the United States)
- Coordinates: 40°57′39″N 77°36′35″W
- Country: United States
- State: Pennsylvania
- County: Centre
- Township: Walker

Area
  - Total: 0.24 sq mi (0.61 km^{2})
  - Land: 0.24 sq mi (0.61 km^{2})
  - Water: 0 sq mi (0.00 km^{2})
- Elevation: 940 ft (290 m)

Population (2020)
  - Total: 121
  - Density: 512.8/sq mi (197.98/km^{2})
- Time zone: UTC-5 (Eastern (EST))
  - Summer (DST): UTC-4 (EDT)
- ZIP code: 16823
- FIPS code: 42-36064
- GNIS feature ID: 1177540

Hublersburg is an unincorporated community and census-designated place in Walker Township, Centre County, Pennsylvania, United States. It is located about 3 miles (5 km) northeast of the community of Mingoville, along Pennsylvania Route 64. As of the 2010 census, the population was 104 residents. The founder of Hublersburg was Jacob Hubler.

== Demographics ==
Historical population
Census	Pop.	Note	%±
2020	121		—
U.S. Decennial Census

== Education ==
The CDP is in Bellefonte Area School District.
