= Zion, Pennsylvania =

Unincorporated community in Pennsylvania, US

- Census-designated place
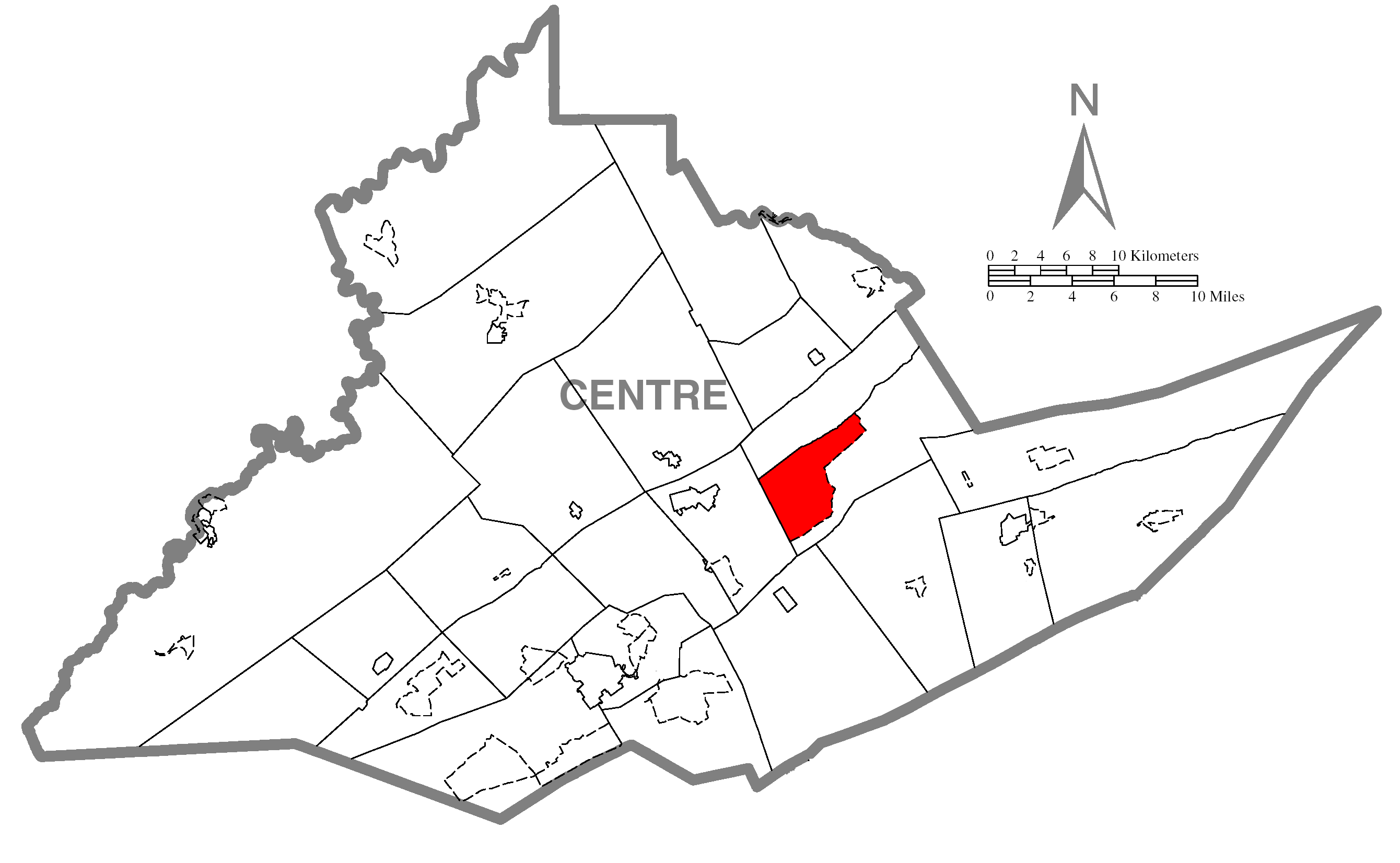
- Location within Centre County

- Location within the U.S. state of Pennsylvania Zion (the United States)
- Coordinates: 40°54′57″N 77°40′50″W
- Country: United States
- State: Pennsylvania
- County: Centre
- Townships: Walker, Spring

Area
  - Total: 2.88 sq mi (7.46 km^{2})
  - Land: 2.88 sq mi (7.46 km^{2})
  - Water: 0 sq mi (0.0 km^{2})
- Elevation: 1,010 ft (310 m)

Population (2022)
  - Total: 2,036
  - Density: 705/sq mi (272.1/km^{2})
- Demonym: Zionist
- Time zone: UTC-5 (Eastern (EST))
  - Summer (DST): UTC-4 (EDT)
- ZIP code: 16823
- Area code: 814
- FIPS code: 42-87320
- GNIS feature ID: 1191960

Zion is an unincorporated community and census-designated place (CDP) in Centre County, Pennsylvania, United States.

== Geography ==
Zion is located in the northeast of the center of Centre County at 40°54′57″N 77°40′50″W (40.915741, -77.680467). The village center is in southwestern Walker Township, but the CDP extends southwest into Spring Township. Zion is in the Nittany Valley, between Nittany Mountain to the southeast and the lower Sand Ridge to the north.

Pennsylvania Routes 64 and 550 join in the eastern part of Zion. PA 64 leads northeast up the Nittany Valley 12 miles (19 km) to Interstate 80 at Lamar and southwest 12 miles (19 km) to State College. PA 550 leads west 3 miles (5 km) to Interstate 99 and 5 miles (8 km) to Bellefonte, the Centre County seat.

According to the United States Census Bureau, the Zion CDP has a total area of 2.88 square miles (7.46 km^{2}), all land.

== Demographics ==
As of the census of 2010, there were 2,030 people, 776 households, and 607 families residing in the CDP. The population density was 155.1 inhabitants per square mile (59.9/km^{2}). There were 821 housing units at an average density of 62.7/sq mi (24.2/km^{2}). The racial makeup of the CDP was 98.2% White, 0.4% Black or African American, 0.1% Native American, 0.2% Asian, 0.1% from other races, and 1.0% from two or more races. Hispanic or Latino of any race were 0.8% of the population.

There were 776 households, out of which 35.7% had children under the age of 18 living with them, 70.0% were married couples living together, 3.5% had a male householder with no wife present, 4.8% had a female householder with no husband present, and 21.7% were non-families. 17.5% of all households were made up of individuals, and 5.0% had someone living alone who was 65 years of age or older. The average household size was 2.61 and the average family size was 2.96.

In the CDP, the population was spread out, with 23.4% under the age of 18, 7.1% from 18 to 24, 31.1% from 25 to 44, 27.8% from 45 to 64, and 10.6% who were 65 years of age or older. The median age was 39 years. For every 100 females, there were 97.5 males. For every 100 females age 18 and over, there were 95.5 males.

The median income for a household in the CDP was $57,477, and the median income for a family was $59,200. The per capita income for the CDP was $27,810. About 2.9% of families and 4.9% of the population were below the poverty line, including 10.0% of those under age 18 and none age 65 or over.

== Education ==
The CDP is in Bellefonte Area School District.
