= State College Regional Airport =

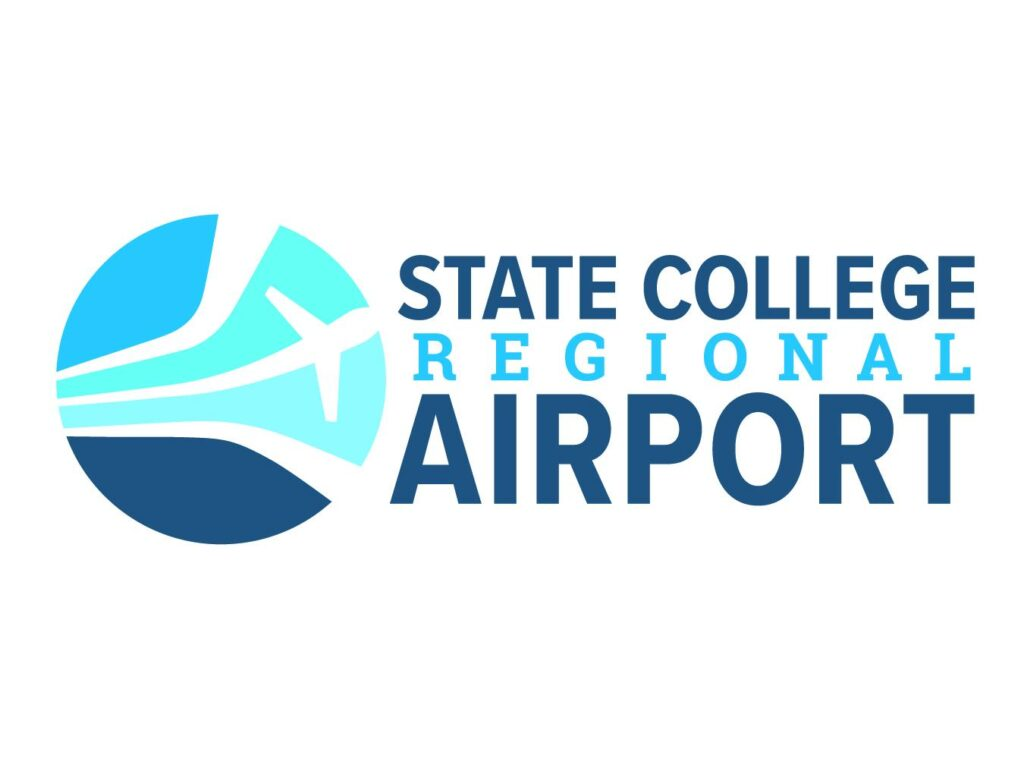

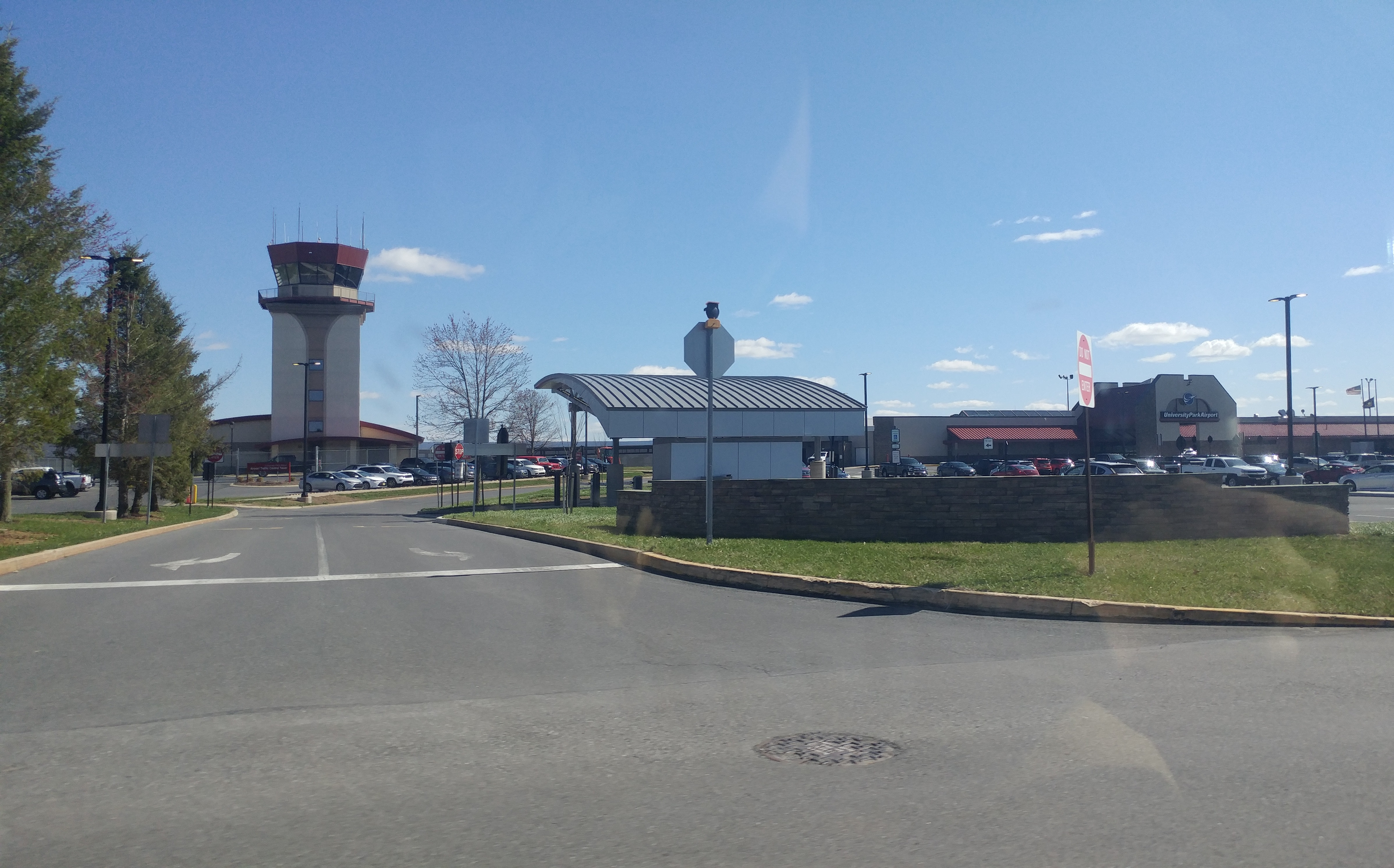
- IATA: SCE; ICAO: KUNV; FAA LID: UNV

Summary
- Airport type: Public
- Operator: Pennsylvania State University; Centre County Airport Authority
- Serves: Central Pennsylvania
- Location: Benner Township, Pennsylvania, U.S.
- Time zone: (UTC -4 EDT/EST)
- Elevation AMSL: 1,239 ft (378 m)
- Coordinates: 40°50′57″N 77°50′55″W
- Website: www.flysce.com

Maps
- FAA airport diagram
- Interactive map of State College Regional Airport

Runways
Direction	Length		Surface
Direction	ft	m	Surface
6/24	6,701	2,042	Asphalt

Statistics (2022)
- Aircraft Movements: 41,759
- Based Aircraft: 53
- Source: FAA

State College Regional Airport (IATA: SCE, ICAO: KUNV, FAA LID: UNV), formerly University Park Airport, is a public airport in Benner Township, Centre County, Pennsylvania, serving State College and Central Pennsylvania. The airport covers 1,105 acres (447 ha) and has one active runway.

The airport is owned by The Pennsylvania State University, but the terminal building and parking areas are owned and operated by the Centre County Airport Authority. On February 26, 2026, Penn State and the airport authority announced a deal to sell the airport to the Centre County Airport Authority. It is currently served by United Express and American Eagle, connecting to hubs in Pennsylvania, Virginia, Illinois and North Carolina.

== History ==
In the 1950's, a small airport was built on land leased from Penn State, just north of State College. The Centre County Airport Authority was created to manage the development of the airport. The October 1959 chart shows a 2350-foot runway 6; the August 1965 chart shows 3000 feet; the November 1967 chart adds 2350-foot runway 16. (The intersection of those two 50-foot runways is still visible at 40.8492°N 77.85315°W). The present runway was built parallel to the old runway 6 in 1973-1974; it was then 5000 feet long.

In 1965, Harrisburg Commuter began flights from State College to Harrisburg, two flights each weekday. The 1965 Official Airlines Guide does not state which airport they served, but starting in 1978, Allegheny Commuter flights were at University Park. Penn State assumed the lease and assets of the airport in 1972. A permanent passenger terminal was built in 1985. A new passenger terminal was completed in 1993, and cargo operations moved to the old terminal. In 1997, the runway was lengthened to 6,701 ft (2,042 m). A new general aviation hangar was built in 2001.

Construction on the control tower began on January 8, 2010 and was completed in August 2011. The Airport Traffic Control Tower (ATCT) went operational on September 1, 2011, and is operated by Midwest Air Traffic Control under the Federal Contract Tower Program.

There were 148,196 enplanements in 2025, making State College Regional Airport the 6th busiest airport in Pennsylvania, after Wilkes Barre/Scranton (AVP), Allentown/Lehigh Valley (ABE), Harrisburg (MDT), Pittsburgh (PIT), and Philadelphia (PHL).

On November 3, 2023, the Centre County Airport Authority announced that University Park Airport had been renamed State College Regional Airport.

== Services ==
The Centre County Airport Authority owns and operates the commercial airline terminal. The terminal consists of a restaurant, vending machines, free Wi-Fi, charging stations for mobile devices, and a conference room. Taxi, limousine services, and car rentals are available. The airport does not have jet bridges, and all aircraft board from ground-level hardstands. However, there are plans to add two boarding bridges in the future. The airport plans to submit an application for a grant from the FAA for the project when funding opportunities are available.

Penn State University fixed-base operator (FBO) offers fuel, flight planning services, aircraft repair, and hangar rental.

Airlines that operate to each destination are listed below:

- Piedmont Airlines and occasionally PSA Airlines operate American Eagle service to Philadelphia.
- Piedmont Airlines operates American Eagle service to Charlotte.
- CommuteAir and occasionally GoJet Airlines and Republic Airways operate United Express service to Washington.
- GoJet Airlines, SkyWest Airlines, and occasionally Republic Airways operate United Express service to Chicago.

As of October 2026, there are four daily flights to Washington-Dulles, three daily flights to Philadelphia, two daily flights to Charlotte, and four daily flights to Chicago.

United Airlines

United currently flies from State College to Chicago O'Hare and Washington Dulles with daily service aboard Bombardier CRJ-550, CRJ-200, and Embraer ERJ-145 regional aircraft. They occasionally utilize the Embraer 175 during peak demand periods.

United Airlines cut Washington Dulles service and added service to Newark in March 2022 to "closely match supply with demand" amid labor and aircraft shortages. This was a temporary shift, and in June 2024, Washington Dulles service was reinstated and Newark service was discontinued.

American Airlines

American currently flies from State College to Philadelphia and Charlotte with daily service aboard Embraer 145 aircraft operated by Piedmont Airlines. PSA Airlines occasionally operates flights onboard CRJ-900 and CRJ-700 aircraft during peak travel periods.

American Eagle operated twice daily service to Chicago from April 2019 to November 2023. This service was operated by Envoy Air onboard Embraer 145 aircraft.

Delta Air Lines

Delta Air Lines operated between State College and Detroit until January 8, 2023, when the service was replaced with service to New York LaGuardia. Delta later suspended service from State College to New York LaGuardia on June 5, 2023, citing personnel shortages. A spokesperson for Delta Air Lines confirmed that Delta was going to "temporarily suspend" service to State College.

Allegiant Air

Allegiant Air operated 2-4 flights per week to Orlando-Sanford and St. Petersburg/Clearwater from October 2019 to May 2022 using Airbus A319 and A320 aircraft. Allegiant suspended all service at State College due to "labor and demand constraints affecting the entire airline industry" in May 2022.

Cargo Flights

At this time, there are no regularly scheduled cargo flights to or from State College Regional Airport. Mountain Air Cargo previously operated Cessna Caravan 208 flights between State College and Pittsburgh under the FedEx Feeder brand. Cargo flights to and from Pittsburgh concluded on May 2, 2026.

Other Offerings

Flixbus has a stop at State College Regional Airport with service from New York City to Chicago.

Private aircraft are serviced by fixed-base operator Penn State Aviation Center.

Tech Aviation Flight School is located at the T-Hangars.

== Facilities ==
=== Runways ===
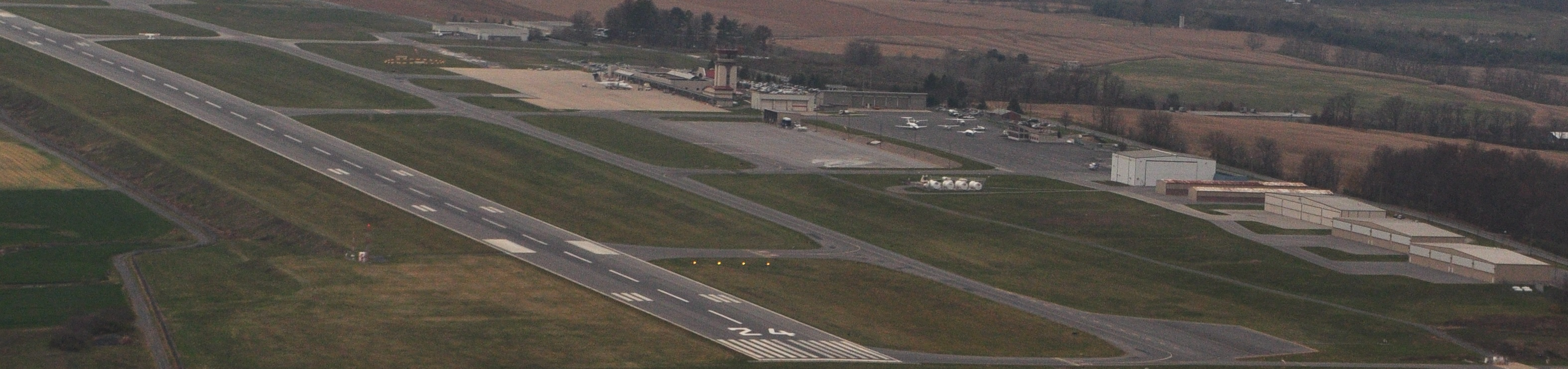
Runway 24 at University Park Airport

State College Regional Airport features one active runway. The end closest to Rock Road is Runway 24, bearing a magnetic heading of 243 degrees. Runway 24 is equipped with an instrument landing system (ILS) and is used as the primary landing and departing runway. Runway 6 is used as a visual runway; however, infrastructure has been considered to improve satellite-based approaches. Runway 16 and 34 was formerly used for general aviation but was closed.

=== Aircraft ===
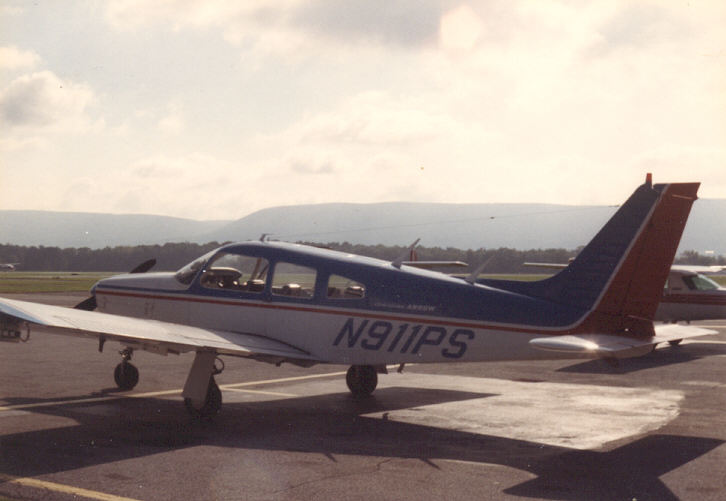
A Piper Cherokee parked at the airport

State College Regional Airport regularly operates the Bombardier CRJ family, Embraer ERJ145s, and Embraer E175s. American Eagle and United Express operate regional jets to the airport. Most commonly, flights are operated on Embraer ERJ-145, Bombardier CRJ-550, Bombardier CRJ-200, and occasionally Embraer E-175 and Bombardier CRJ-900 aircraft. De Havilland Canada Dash 8s were common until their replacement by regional jets. Geisinger operates an Airbus H145 helicopter as a LifeFlight service, with a hangar at the airport. The airport sees numerous general aviation aircraft; Piper PA-28 Cherokees and business jets are common, while larger aircraft up to Boeing 757s can be seen as charter jets along with members of the Boeing 737 and Airbus A320 families.

== Airlines and destinations ==
=== Passenger ===
Airlines	Destinations
American Eagle	Charlotte, Philadelphia
United Express	Chicago–O'Hare, Washington–Dulles

== Statistics ==
=== Top destinations ===
Busiest routes from SCE (July 2025 - June 2026)
Rank	City	Passengers	Carrier
1	Chicago–O'Hare, Illinois	60,660	United
2	Washington–Dulles, Virginia	46,730	United
3	Philadelphia, Pennsylvania	46,160	American

Top Destinations (June 2025 - May 2026)
1. Chicago (39.4%)
2. Philadelphia (30.3%)
3. Washington (30.3%)

=== Carrier shares ===
Regional carrier shares (June 2025 - May 2026) Based on passengers both departing and arriving.
Carrier	Passengers (arriving and departing)
Piedmont	91,990(30.17%)
CommuteAir	89,740(29.43%)
GoJet	78,680(25.8%)
SkyWest	38,730(12.7%)
Republic Airways	4,770(1.56%)

Airline Market Share at SCE (June 2025 - May 2026)
Rank	Airline	Passengers	Market Share
1	United Airlines	211,920	69.73%
2	American Airlines	91,990	30.27%

Carrier Shares (June 2025 - May 2026)
1. United (69.7%)
2. American (30.3%)

=== Annual traffic ===
Year	Passengers	Year	Passengers	Year	Passengers	Year	Passengers
2008	201,898	2014	270,891	2020	143,000	2026	
2009	209,777	2015	277,128	2021	240,000	2027	
2010	211,154	2016	262,260	2022	215,000	2028	
2011	213,929	2017	267,530	2023	267,000	2029	
2012	230,121	2018	298,800	2024	257,000	2030	
2013	229,923	2019	379,100	2025	291,400	2031	

== Military ==
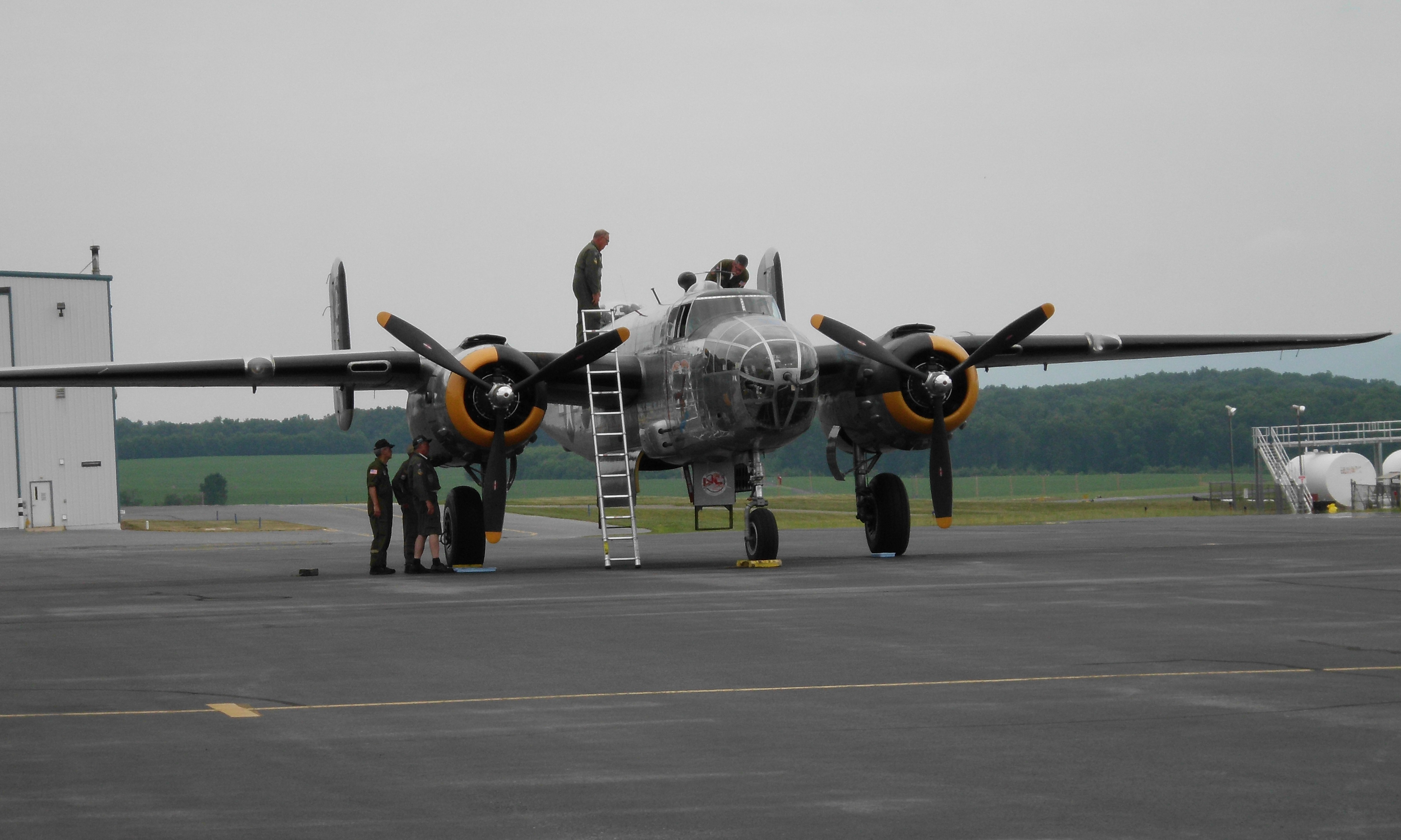
B-25 Mitchell "Yankee Warrior"

State College Regional Airport is home to Civil Air Patrol Nittany Composite Squadron PA-338. The squadron operates a Cessna 182 Skylane registered as N848CP.

The United States Army and Air National Guard routinely fly Sikorsky UH-60 Black Hawk helicopters and Lockheed C-130 Hercules aircraft into UNV for training missions. Aircraft such as the F/A-18 Hornet and A-10 Thunderbolt II have staged at the airport to participate in flyovers of Beaver Stadium.

U.S. Presidents have flown into UNV aboard Boeing C-32s operating as Air Force One.

== See also ==
- List of airports in Pennsylvania
