= Muff, Pennsylvania =

Unincorporated community in Pennsylvania, US

- Unincorporated community
- Location within Pennsylvania
- Coordinates: 40°53′04″N 79°20′17″W
- Country: United States
- State: Pennsylvania
- County: Armstrong
- Elevation: 1,499 ft (457 m)
- Time zone: UTC-5 (Eastern (EST))
  - Summer (DST): UTC-4 (EDT)
- GNIS feature ID: 1204242

Muff is an unincorporated community in Armstrong County, Pennsylvania, United States. The highest natural point in Armstrong County is located near Muff.

A post office called Muff was established in 1879, and remained in operation until it was discontinued in 1908. A variant name is "Snyderville".
