= Spring Creek (Bald Eagle Creek tributary) =

Coordinates: 40°56′35″N 77°47′14″W

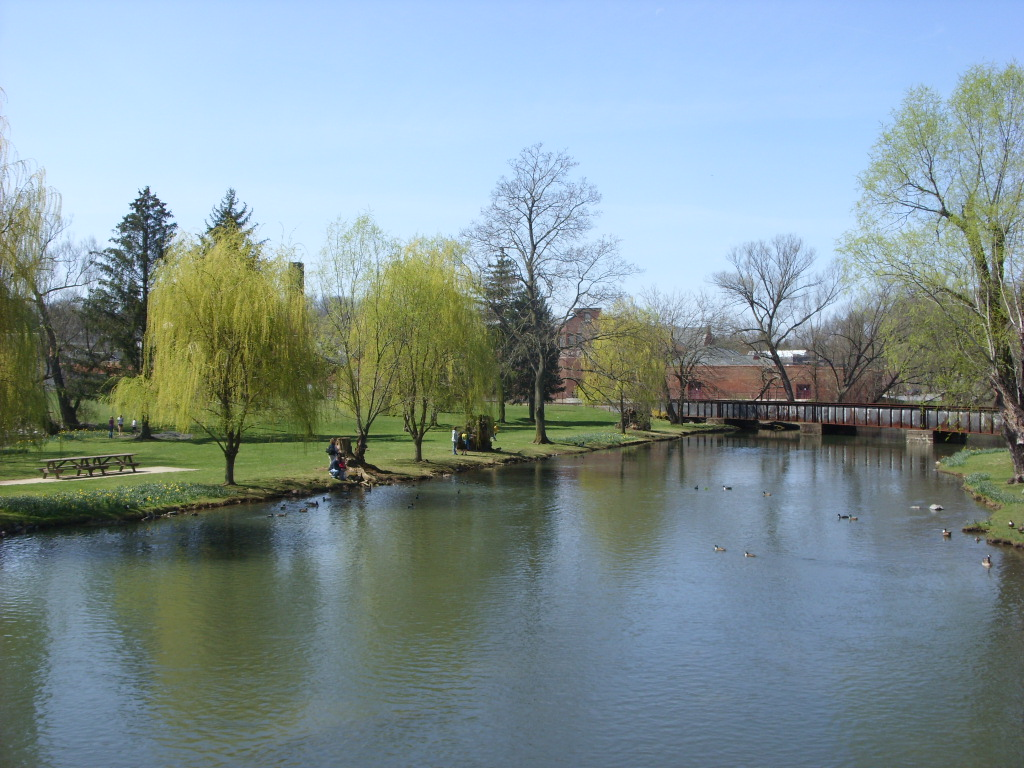
- View of Spring Creek in Bellefonte, Pennsylvania

Physical characteristics
- Source
  - location: Potter Township, Centre County, Pennsylvania
- Mouth
  - location: Bald Eagle Creek in Milesburg, Pennsylvania
- Length: 25.2 mi (40.6 km)

Basin features
- Progression: Bald Eagle Creek; West Branch Susquehanna River; Susquehanna River; Chesapeake Bay
- River system: Susquehanna River system

Spring Creek is a 25.2-mile-long (40.6 km) tributary of Bald Eagle Creek in Centre County, Pennsylvania in the United States.

Formed by springs near the base of Tussey Mountain, Spring Creek flows through Nittany Valley past State College. It then flows through Spring Creek Canyon and through the town of Bellefonte, before eventually passing through a water gap in Bald Eagle Mountain. The stream joins Bald Eagle Creek in the town of Milesburg.

== Recreation ==
Spring Creek is a popular outdoor recreation destination for kayaking, hiking, and fly fishing. Throughout most of Spring Creek Canyon, the stream is paralleled by the Spring Creek Canyon Trail, offering public access.

=== Fly Fishing ===
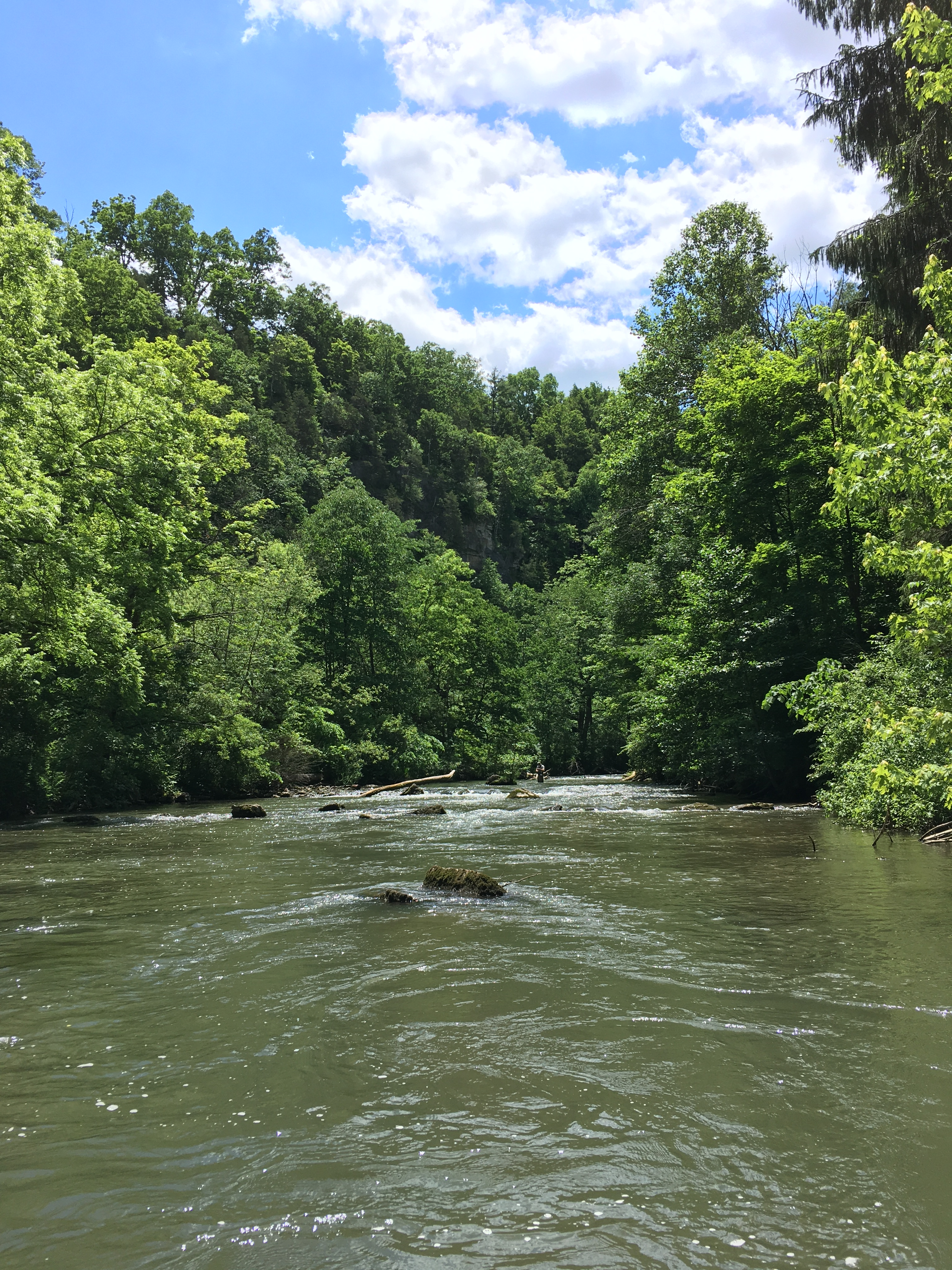
View of Spring Creek in Bellefonte, Pennsylvania

Spring Creek is renowned as a popular fly fishing destination in the Northeast. The stream is well-known for Fisherman's Paradise, a 1.12 mile section owned and managed by the Pennsylvania Fish and Boat Commission. The majority of Spring Creek is managed under Catch and Release, All-Tackle fishing regulations, however Fisherman's Paradise is specially managed under Catch and Release, Fly Fishing Only regulations.

Benner Spring State Fish Hatchery, a 40 acre trout hatchery operated by the Pennsylvania Fish and Boat Commission, is situated on Spring Creek. The stream, as well as nearby Benner Spring, provide water to the facility.

=== Kayaking ===
Spring Creek is the site of a kayak and canoe slalom training center, located in Bellefonte. Additionally, a class I whitewater run of roughly 2 miles exists from Bellefonte to the stream's mouth in Milesburg.

== Tributaries ==
- Cedar Run
- Slab Cabin Run
- Logan Branch
- Buffalo Run

== See also ==
- List of rivers of Pennsylvania
