= Centre County, Pennsylvania =

County in Pennsylvania, United States

- County
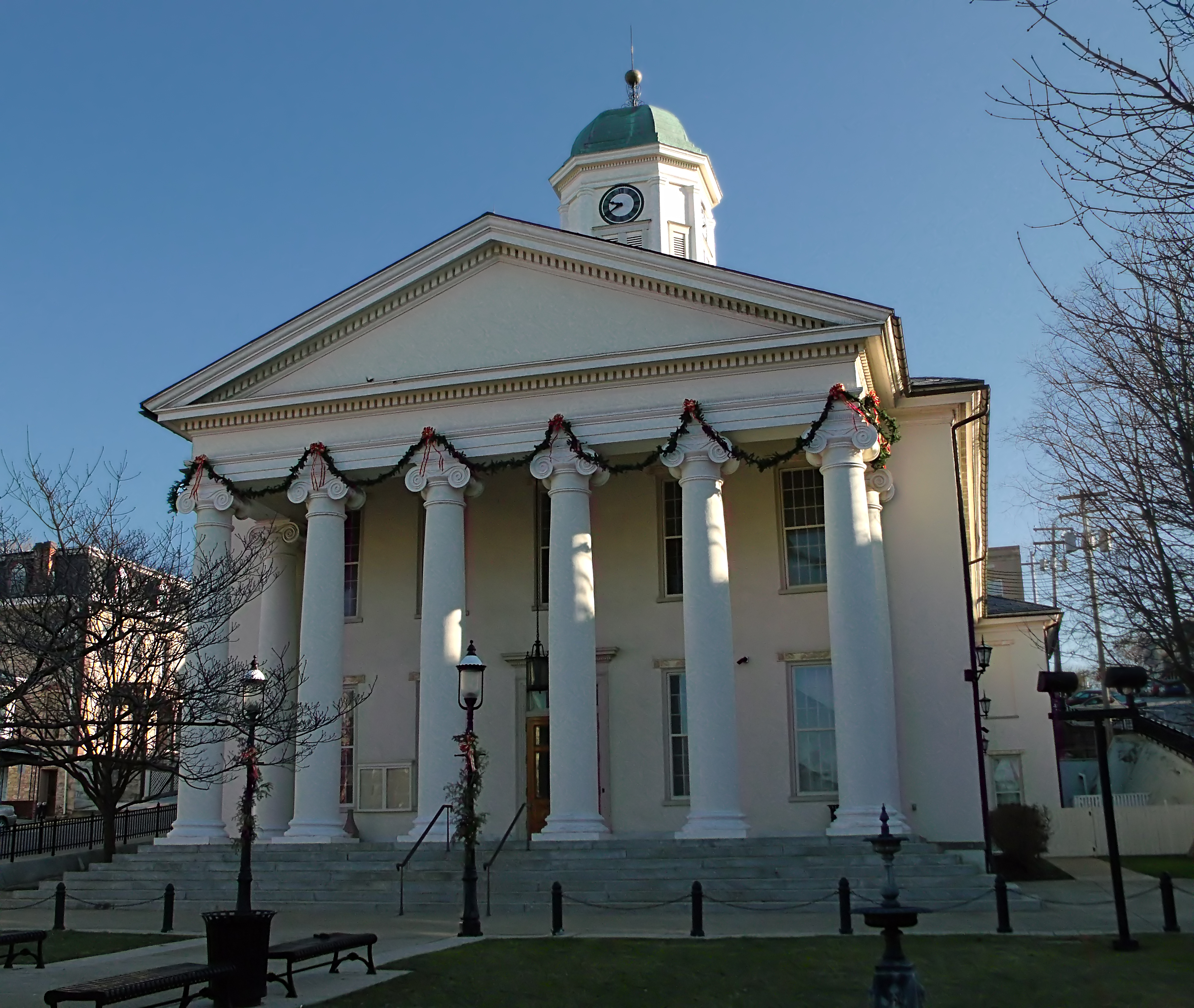
- The Centre County Courthouse in Bellefonte, 2009

- Flag Seal Logo

- Location within the U.S. state of Pennsylvania
- Coordinates: 40°55′N 77°49′W
- Country: United States
- State: Pennsylvania
- Founded: February 13, 1800
- Named for: Centre Furnace, the first industrial facility in the area
- Seat: Bellefonte
- Largest borough: State College

Area
  - Total: 1,113 sq mi (2,880 km^{2})
  - Land: 1,110 sq mi (2,900 km^{2})
  - Water: 3.0 sq mi (7.8 km^{2}) 0.3%

Population (2020)
  - Total: 158,172
  - Estimate (2025): 157,393 ▼
  - Density: 144/sq mi (56/km^{2})
- Time zone: UTC−5 (Eastern)
  - Summer (DST): UTC−4 (EDT)
- Congressional district: 15th
- Website: centrecountypa.gov

Pennsylvania Historical Marker
- Designated: May 10, 1982

Centre County is a county in the Commonwealth of Pennsylvania, United States. As of the 2020 census, the population was 158,172. Its county seat is Bellefonte. Centre County is composed of the State College, PA Metropolitan Statistical Area. The county is part of the Central region of the commonwealth. (Note: Includes Centre, Lycoming, Northumberland, Columbia, Mifflin, Union, Snyder, Clinton, Juniata and Montour Counties)

== History ==
The land of the future Centre County was first recorded by James Potter in 1764. Potter reached the top of Nittany Mountain and "seeing the prairies and noble forest beneath him, cried out to his attendant, 'By heavens, Thompson, I have discovered an empire!'" Centre County was created on February 13, 1800 by Act 2092 of the Pennsylvania Legislature from parts of Huntingdon, Lycoming, Mifflin, and Northumberland counties. The act said that its inhabitants "labour under great hardships, by reason of their great distance from the present seats of justice, and the public offices" of their current counties. Its population was 4,112. Centre was among ten new counties carved from the existing twenty-six in early 1800. The county was named after the Centre Furnace.

== Geography ==
According to the U.S. Census Bureau, the county has a total area of 1,113 square miles (2,880 km^{2}), of which 1,110 square miles (2,900 km^{2}) is land and 3.0 square miles (7.8 km^{2}) (0.3%) is water. Centre County is one of the 423 counties served by the Appalachian Regional Commission. It is the fifth-largest county in Pennsylvania by area and its area code is 814.

Centre County has a humid continental climate (Dfb/Dfa at lower elevations).

State College

Climate chart (precipitation, max. and min. temperature)
| J | F | M | A | M | J | J | A | S | O | N | D |
| 2.7 34 20 | 2.5 38 22 | 3.4 46 28 | 3.2 60 39 | 3.5 70 49 | 4.1 78 59 | 3.5 82 63 | 3.8 80 61 | 3.7 72 53 | 3.1 61 42 | 3.4 50 34 | 2.9 38 25 |
- █ Average max. and min. temperatures in °F
- █ Precipitation totals in inches
- Source: Pennsylvania State Climatologist
Metric conversion
| J | F | M | A | M | J | J | A | S | O | N | D |
| 70 1 −7 | 64 3 −6 | 87 8 −2 | 81 15 4 | 88 21 10 | 104 26 15 | 89 28 17 | 98 27 16 | 93 22 12 | 78 16 6 | 85 10 1 | 73 3 −4 |
- █ Average max. and min. temperatures in °C
- █ Precipitation totals in mm

=== Features ===
- Bald Eagle Valley
- Bald Eagle Mountain
- Nittany Valley
- Mount Nittany
- Penns Valley
- Tussey Mountain

=== Adjacent counties ===
- Clinton County (north)
- Union County (east)
- Mifflin County (southeast)
- Huntingdon County (south)
- Blair County (south)
- Clearfield County (west)

== Demographics ==
Historical population
| Census | Pop. | Note | %± |
|---|---|---|---|
| 1810 | 10,681 | | — |
| 1820 | 13,796 | | 29.2% |
| 1830 | 18,879 | | 36.8% |
| 1840 | 20,492 | | 8.5% |
| 1850 | 23,355 | | 14.0% |
| 1860 | 27,000 | | 15.6% |
| 1870 | 34,418 | | 27.5% |
| 1880 | 37,922 | | 10.2% |
| 1890 | 43,269 | | 14.1% |
| 1900 | 42,894 | | −0.9% |
| 1910 | 43,424 | | 1.2% |
| 1920 | 44,304 | | 2.0% |
| 1930 | 46,294 | | 4.5% |
| 1940 | 52,608 | | 13.6% |
| 1950 | 65,922 | | 25.3% |
| 1960 | 78,580 | | 19.2% |
| 1970 | 99,267 | | 26.3% |
| 1980 | 112,760 | | 13.6% |
| 1990 | 123,786 | | 9.8% |
| 2000 | 135,760 | | 9.7% |
| 2010 | 153,990 | | 13.4% |
| 2020 | 158,172 | | 2.7% |
| 2025 (est.) | 157,393 | ▼ | −0.5% |

=== Racial and ethnic composition ===
Centre County, Pennsylvania – Racial and ethnic composition Note: the US Census treats Hispanic/Latino as an ethnic category. This table excludes Latinos from the racial categories and assigns them to a separate category. Hispanics/Latinos may be of any race.
| Race / Ethnicity (NH = Non-Hispanic) | Pop 1980 | Pop 1990 | Pop 2000 | Pop 2010 | Pop 2020 | % 1980 | % 1990 | % 2000 | % 2010 | % 2020 |
|---|---|---|---|---|---|---|---|---|---|---|
| White alone (NH) | 108,690 | 115,655 | 123,055 | 135,427 | 129,668 | 96.39% | 93.43% | 90.64% | 87.95% | 81.98% |
| Black or African American alone (NH) | 1,439 | 2,726 | 3,469 | 4,456 | 5,306 | 1.28% | 2.20% | 2.56% | 2.89% | 3.35% |
| Native American or Alaska Native alone (NH) | 113 | 171 | 155 | 153 | 120 | 0.10% | 0.14% | 0.11% | 0.10% | 0.08% |
| Asian alone (NH) | 1,201 | 3,817 | 5,354 | 7,934 | 11,373 | 1.07% | 3.08% | 3.94% | 5.15% | 7.19% |
| Native Hawaiian or Pacific Islander alone (NH) | x | x | 91 | 42 | 39 | x | x | 0.07% | 0.03% | 0.02% |
| Other race alone (NH) | 487 | 67 | 123 | 202 | 596 | 0.43% | 0.05% | 0.09% | 0.13% | 0.38% |
| Mixed race or Multiracial (NH) | x | x | 1,268 | 2,086 | 5,419 | x | x | 0.93% | 1.35% | 3.43% |
| Hispanic or Latino (any race) | 830 | 1,350 | 2,243 | 3,690 | 5,651 | 0.74% | 1.09% | 1.65% | 2.40% | 3.57% |
| Total | 112,760 | 123,786 | 135,758 | 153,990 | 158,172 | 100.00% | 100.00% | 100.00% | 100.00% | 100.00% |

=== 2020 census ===
As of the 2020 census, the county had a population of 158,172. The median age was 31.5 years. 15.0% of residents were under the age of 18 and 15.1% of residents were 65 years of age or older. For every 100 females there were 107.9 males, and for every 100 females age 18 and over there were 108.6 males age 18 and over.

The racial makeup of the county was 83.0% White, 3.5% Black or African American, 0.1% American Indian and Alaska Native, 7.2% Asian, <0.1% Native Hawaiian and Pacific Islander, 1.3% from some other race, and 4.9% from two or more races. Hispanic or Latino residents of any race comprised 3.6% of the population.

65.4% of residents lived in urban areas, while 34.6% lived in rural areas.

There were 59,357 households in the county, of which 21.8% had children under the age of 18 living in them. Of all households, 43.8% were married-couple households, 24.3% were households with a male householder and no spouse or partner present, and 26.3% were households with a female householder and no spouse or partner present. About 30.8% of all households were made up of individuals and 10.0% had someone living alone who was 65 years of age or older.

There were 65,408 housing units, of which 9.3% were vacant. Among occupied housing units, 57.7% were owner-occupied and 42.3% were renter-occupied. The homeowner vacancy rate was 1.0% and the rental vacancy rate was 5.5%.

=== 2010 census ===
As of the 2010 census, there were 153,990 people, 57,573 households, and 31,256 families residing in the county. The population density was 139 people per square mile (54 people/km^{2}). There were 63,297 housing units at an average density of 57 units per square mile (22/km^{2}). The racial makeup of the county was 89.4% White, 3.0% Black or African American, 0.1% Native American, 5.2% Asian, 0.1% Pacific Islander, 0.7% from other races, and 1.5% from two or more races. 2.4% of the population were Hispanic or Latino of any race.

There were 57,573 households, out of which 23.3% had children under the age of 18 living with them, 44.6% were married couples living together, 3.3% had a male householder with no wife present, 6.4% had a female householder with no husband present, and 45.7% were non-families. 28.7% of all households were made up of individuals, and 8.3% had someone living alone who was 65 years of age or older. The average household size was 2.38 and the average family size was 2.91.

In the county, 15.9% of the population was under the age of 18, 28.9% was from 18 to 24, 22.6% from 25 to 44, 21.3% from 45 to 64, and 11.3% was 65 years of age or older. The median age was 29 years. For every 100 females there were 107.5 males. For every 100 females age 18 and over, there were 108.1 males.

== Metropolitan statistical area ==
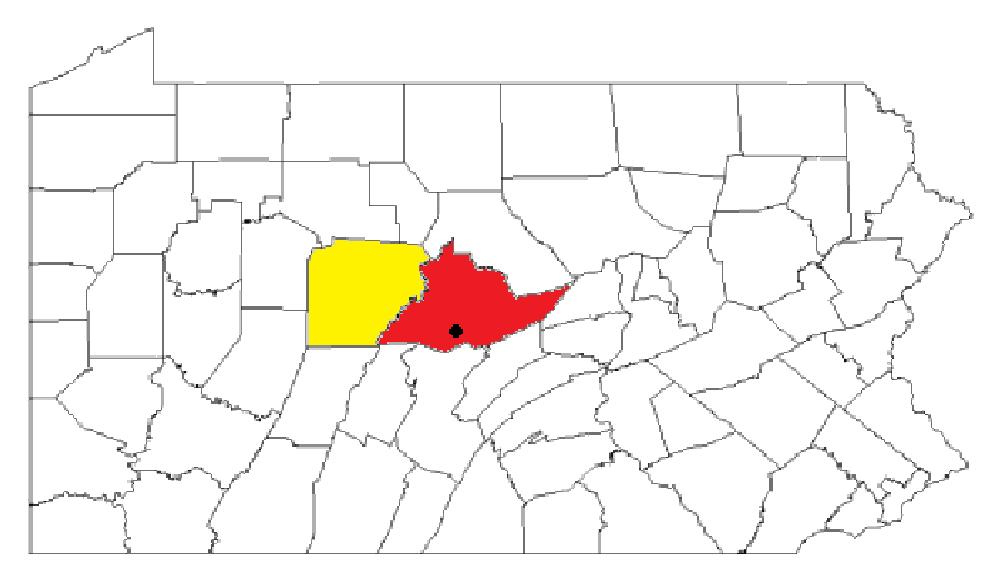
Map of the State College-DuBois, PA Combined Statistical Area (CSA), composed of the following parts: State College, PA Metropolitan Statistical Area DuBois, PA Micropolitan Statistical Area

The United States Office of Management and Budget has designated Centre County as the State College, PA Metropolitan Statistical Area (MSA). As of the 2010 U.S. census the metropolitan area ranked 13th most populous in Pennsylvania and the 259th most populous in the United States with a population of 155,403. Centre County is also a part of the larger State College–DuBois, PA Combined Statistical Area (CSA), which combines the populations of Centre County as well as Clearfield County to the west. The combined statistical area ranked ninth in Pennsylvania and 123rd most populous in the United States with a population of 236,577.

== Law and government ==
=== County commissioners ===
- Mark Higgins, Chairman (Democrat)
- Amber Concepcion, Vice-chair (Democrat)
- Steven G. Dershem, Commissioner (Republican)

=== Other county offices ===
- Clerk of Courts and Prothonotary, Jeremy Breon, Democrat
- Controller, Jason Moser, Democrat
- Coroner, Scott Sayers, Democrat
- District Attorney, Bernie Cantorna, Democrat
- Recorder of Deeds, Joe Davidson, Republican
- Register of Wills, Christine Millinder, Republican
- Sheriff, Bryan Sampsel, Republican
- Treasurer, Colleen Kennedy, Democrat

=== State senate ===
- Cris Dush, Republican, Pennsylvania's 35th Senatorial District

=== State House of Representatives ===
- Scott Conklin, Democrat, Pennsylvania's 77th Representative District
- Paul Takac, Democrat, Pennsylvania's 82nd Representative District
- Kerry Benninghoff, Republican, Pennsylvania's 171st Representative District

=== United States House of Representatives ===
- Glenn "G.T." Thompson, Republican, Pennsylvania's 15th congressional district

=== United States Senate ===
- Dave McCormick, Republican
- John Fetterman, Democrat

== Politics ==
Chart of Voter Registration
1. Democratic (40.5%)
2. Republican (41.3%)
3. Independent (15.2%)
4. Other Parties (3.00%)

United States presidential election results for Centre County, Pennsylvania
| Year | Republican | | Democratic | | Third party(ies) | |
| Year | No. | % | No. | % | No. | % |
|---|---|---|---|---|---|---|
| 1880 | 3,602 | 43.30% | 4,598 | 55.28% | 118 | 1.42% |
| 1884 | 4,057 | 46.66% | 4,495 | 51.70% | 143 | 1.64% |
| 1888 | 4,574 | 48.29% | 4,712 | 49.75% | 185 | 1.95% |
| 1892 | 3,698 | 42.72% | 4,624 | 53.42% | 334 | 3.86% |
| 1896 | 4,880 | 49.93% | 4,546 | 46.51% | 348 | 3.56% |
| 1900 | 4,684 | 50.64% | 4,339 | 46.91% | 226 | 2.44% |
| 1904 | 5,291 | 55.18% | 4,015 | 41.87% | 283 | 2.95% |
| 1908 | 4,927 | 53.12% | 3,998 | 43.10% | 351 | 3.78% |
| 1912 | 1,507 | 19.01% | 3,445 | 43.46% | 2,974 | 37.52% |
| 1916 | 4,392 | 50.02% | 4,120 | 46.92% | 269 | 3.06% |
| 1920 | 7,615 | 57.82% | 4,783 | 36.31% | 773 | 5.87% |
| 1924 | 7,723 | 59.13% | 4,443 | 34.01% | 896 | 6.86% |
| 1928 | 12,005 | 77.17% | 3,431 | 22.05% | 121 | 0.78% |
| 1932 | 8,264 | 52.55% | 7,053 | 44.85% | 409 | 2.60% |
| 1936 | 9,869 | 45.24% | 11,734 | 53.79% | 211 | 0.97% |
| 1940 | 10,665 | 51.75% | 9,869 | 47.88% | 76 | 0.37% |
| 1944 | 10,048 | 55.08% | 8,064 | 44.21% | 130 | 0.71% |
| 1948 | 10,416 | 61.52% | 6,515 | 38.48% | 0 | 0.00% |
| 1952 | 14,700 | 66.31% | 7,391 | 33.34% | 77 | 0.35% |
| 1956 | 15,412 | 67.18% | 7,483 | 32.62% | 45 | 0.20% |
| 1960 | 18,357 | 67.98% | 8,601 | 31.85% | 46 | 0.17% |
| 1964 | 9,481 | 36.19% | 16,556 | 63.20% | 158 | 0.60% |
| 1968 | 15,865 | 55.61% | 11,163 | 39.13% | 1,499 | 5.25% |
| 1972 | 20,683 | 60.48% | 13,194 | 38.58% | 320 | 0.94% |
| 1976 | 21,177 | 52.37% | 17,867 | 44.18% | 1,393 | 3.44% |
| 1980 | 20,605 | 48.33% | 15,987 | 37.50% | 6,039 | 14.17% |
| 1984 | 27,802 | 62.85% | 16,194 | 36.61% | 240 | 0.54% |
| 1988 | 23,875 | 56.14% | 18,357 | 43.17% | 295 | 0.69% |
| 1992 | 20,478 | 39.98% | 21,177 | 41.34% | 9,570 | 18.68% |
| 1996 | 20,935 | 44.71% | 21,145 | 45.16% | 4,746 | 10.14% |
| 2000 | 26,172 | 52.79% | 21,409 | 43.19% | 1,994 | 4.02% |
| 2004 | 33,133 | 51.47% | 30,733 | 47.74% | 508 | 0.79% |
| 2008 | 32,992 | 43.35% | 41,950 | 55.12% | 1,169 | 1.54% |
| 2012 | 34,001 | 48.65% | 34,176 | 48.90% | 1,709 | 2.45% |
| 2016 | 35,274 | 45.63% | 37,088 | 47.97% | 4,945 | 6.40% |
| 2020 | 36,372 | 46.70% | 40,055 | 51.42% | 1,464 | 1.88% |
| 2024 | 38,829 | 47.85% | 41,119 | 50.67% | 1,205 | 1.48% |

United States Senate election results for Centre County, Pennsylvania1
| Year | Republican | | Democratic | | Third party(ies) | |
| Year | No. | % | No. | % | No. | % |
|---|---|---|---|---|---|---|
| 1994 | 18,827 | 54.91% | 14,284 | 41.66% | 1,173 | 3.42% |
| 2000 | 30,002 | 61.92% | 16,706 | 34.48% | 1,741 | 3.59% |
| 2006 | 18,639 | 43.12% | 24,582 | 56.88% | 0 | 0.00% |
| 2012 | 32,112 | 46.89% | 34,156 | 49.88% | 2,212 | 3.23% |
| 2018 | 24,332 | 40.11% | 34,778 | 57.33% | 1,554 | 2.56% |
| 2024 | 38,054 | 47.32% | 40,382 | 50.22% | 1,979 | 2.46% |

United States Senate election results for Centre County, Pennsylvania3
| Year | Republican | | Democratic | | Third party(ies) | |
| Year | No. | % | No. | % | No. | % |
|---|---|---|---|---|---|---|
| 1992 | 23,626 | 46.70% | 23,863 | 47.16% | 3,106 | 6.14% |
| 1998 | 20,909 | 67.74% | 9,041 | 29.29% | 917 | 2.97% |
| 2004 | 33,633 | 53.84% | 24,261 | 38.84% | 4,574 | 7.32% |
| 2010 | 23,111 | 51.69% | 21,602 | 48.31% | 0 | 0.00% |
| 2016 | 36,527 | 47.82% | 35,487 | 46.45% | 4,378 | 5.73% |
| 2022 | 27,902 | 44.96% | 32,597 | 52.52% | 1,562 | 2.52% |

Pennsylvania Gubernatorial election results for Centre County
| Year | Republican | | Democratic | | Third party(ies) | |
| Year | No. | % | No. | % | No. | % |
|---|---|---|---|---|---|---|
| 1970 | 11,448 | 48.07% | 11,762 | 49.39% | 606 | 2.54% |
| 1974 | 12,950 | 49.64% | 12,891 | 49.42% | 246 | 0.94% |
| 1978 | 18,529 | 61.34% | 11,343 | 37.55% | 337 | 1.12% |
| 1982 | 19,117 | 59.36% | 12,610 | 39.16% | 476 | 1.48% |
| 1986 | 17,294 | 56.52% | 13,029 | 42.58% | 273 | 0.89% |
| 1990 | 11,925 | 40.61% | 17,442 | 59.39% | 0 | 0.00% |
| 1994 | 17,087 | 49.84% | 12,569 | 36.66% | 4,629 | 13.50% |
| 1998 | 20,175 | 65.15% | 7,295 | 23.56% | 3,497 | 11.29% |
| 2002 | 19,027 | 54.52% | 14,557 | 41.71% | 1,315 | 3.77% |
| 2006 | 20,051 | 46.13% | 23,415 | 53.87% | 0 | 0.00% |
| 2010 | 24,458 | 54.51% | 20,407 | 45.49% | 0 | 0.00% |
| 2014 | 16,489 | 42.41% | 22,393 | 57.59% | 0 | 0.00% |
| 2018 | 24,353 | 40.13% | 34,961 | 57.62% | 1,364 | 2.25% |
| 2022 | 25,201 | 40.64% | 35,653 | 57.49% | 1,163 | 1.88% |

Centre County for many years has been a strongly Republican county, like most of central Pennsylvania. By the 21st century however, it became more competitive, in line with college towns around the country. Democratic strength is largely around the Happy Valley (home of Penn State University Park) and county seat Bellefonte, with the rest of the county being Republican.

In 2000 George W. Bush defeated Al Gore with 52% of the vote to Gore's 43%. In 2004 Bush won the county by a much smaller margin. Bush won 51% to Kerry's 47%, a margin of only 4%. In 2006, Governor Ed Rendell and Bob Casey Jr. both carried Centre, and Democrat Scott Conklin decisively won the State House seat left open by the retirement of Republican Lynn Herman in the 77th district. In 2008, Democrats captured the countywide registration edge, Barack Obama carried the county with 55% of the vote to McCain's 44%, and Democratic statewide winners (Rob McCord for Treasurer and Jack Wagner for Auditor General also carried Centre).

2024 presidential election, shaded by city and township Harris: 50–60% 60–70% Trump: 50–60% 60–70% 70–80% 80–90%

In 2012, Barack Obama won the county in his reelection campaign by a very narrow margin, 48.9% to 48.65%, a difference of just 175 votes. In 2016, Democrat Hillary Clinton beat Republican nominee Donald Trump 47.76% to 45.86%. In the same election, incumbent Republican Senator Pat Toomey beat Democratic opponent Katie McGinty 47.91% to 46.2% in the county.

=== Voter registration ===
As of October 19, 2026, there were 102,972 registered voters in Centre County. For the first time since the end of 2024, there are more registered Democrats than Republicans as of this date.

- Democratic: 42,054 (40.84%)
- Republican: 41,869 (40.66%)
- No affiliation: 16,531 (16.05%)
- Other: 2,698 (2.62%)

== Education ==
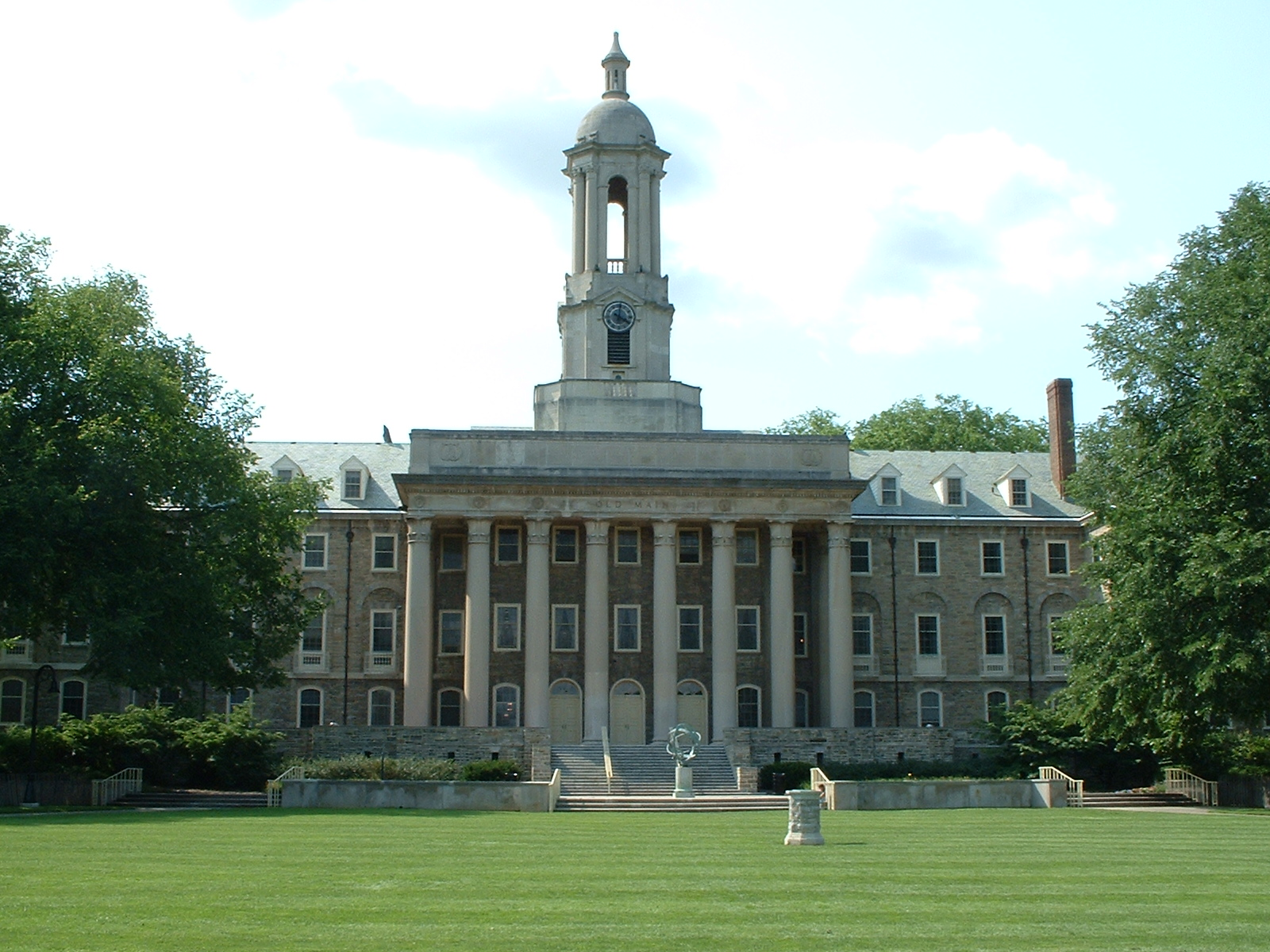
Old Main, the main administrative building of Penn State, at University Park, July 2006

=== Colleges and universities ===
- Pennsylvania State University

=== Community, junior, and technical colleges ===
- South Hills School of Business & Technology
- Central Pennsylvania Institute of Science and Technology, public Vo Tech in Pleasant Gap

=== Public school districts ===
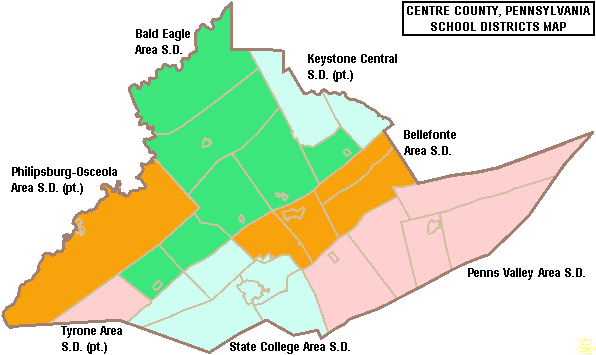
Map of Centre County, Pennsylvania Public School Districts

School districts include:

- Bald Eagle Area School District
- Bellefonte Area School District
- Keystone Central School District (also in Clinton County)
- Penns Valley Area School District
- Philipsburg-Osceola Area School District (also in Clearfield County)
- State College Area School District
- Tyrone Area School District (also in Blair County and Huntingdon County)

=== Public charter schools ===
- Young Scholars of Central PA Charter School
- Centre Learning Community Charter School
- Nittany Valley Charter School
- There are 13 public cyber charter schools in Pennsylvania that are available for free statewide, to children K-12. See: Education in Pennsylvania.

=== Private schools ===
As reported by the Pennsylvania Department of Education 2010.

- Bower Hollow Parochial School – Woodward
- Elk Creek School – Rebersburg
- Faith Christian Academy – Philipsburg
- Grace Prep – Ferguson
- Hill Side School – Rebersburg
- Hubler Ridge School – Bellefonte
- Kramer Gap School – Spring Mills
- Little Nittany Amish Parochial School – Howard
- Mountain View School – Rebersburg
- Nittany Christian School – State College
- Our Lady of Victory School – State College
- Park Forest Montessori School - Patton
- Peach Lane Amish School – Madisonburg
- Penns Valley Amish Paroch School – Woodward
- Rockville School – Rebersburg
- Spring Bank School – Rebersburg
- St John Evangelist School – Bellefonte
- St. Joseph's Academy – Boalsburg
- State College Friends School – State College
- Sunny Meadow Parochial School – Howard
- Sunset View School – Howard
- Sunset View School – Rebersburg
- Windy Poplars School – Centre Hall
- Woodside Amish School – Spring Mills

=== Libraries ===
- Centre County Libraries
  - Centre County Library & Historical Museum – Bellefonte
  - Centre Hall Area Branch Library – Centre Hall
  - Holt Memorial Library – Philipsburg
  - Centre County Bookmobile
- American Philatelic Research Library
- Schlow Centre Region Library

==== Pennsylvania State University libraries ====
- Pattee Library
- Paterno Library
- Architecture and Landscape Architecture Library
- Earth and Mineral Sciences Library
- Engineering Library
- Physical and Mathematical Sciences Library

== Transportation ==
=== Airport ===
State College Regional Airport offers daily commercial and general aviation flights. United Express and American Eagle service the airport currently with nonstop flights to Philadelphia, Washington-Dulles, and Chicago-O'Hare.

=== Major highways ===
- I-80
- I-99
- US 322
- US 322 Bus.
- US 220
- US 220 Alt.
- PA 26
- PA 45
- PA 64
- PA 144
- PA 150
- PA 192

== Recreation ==
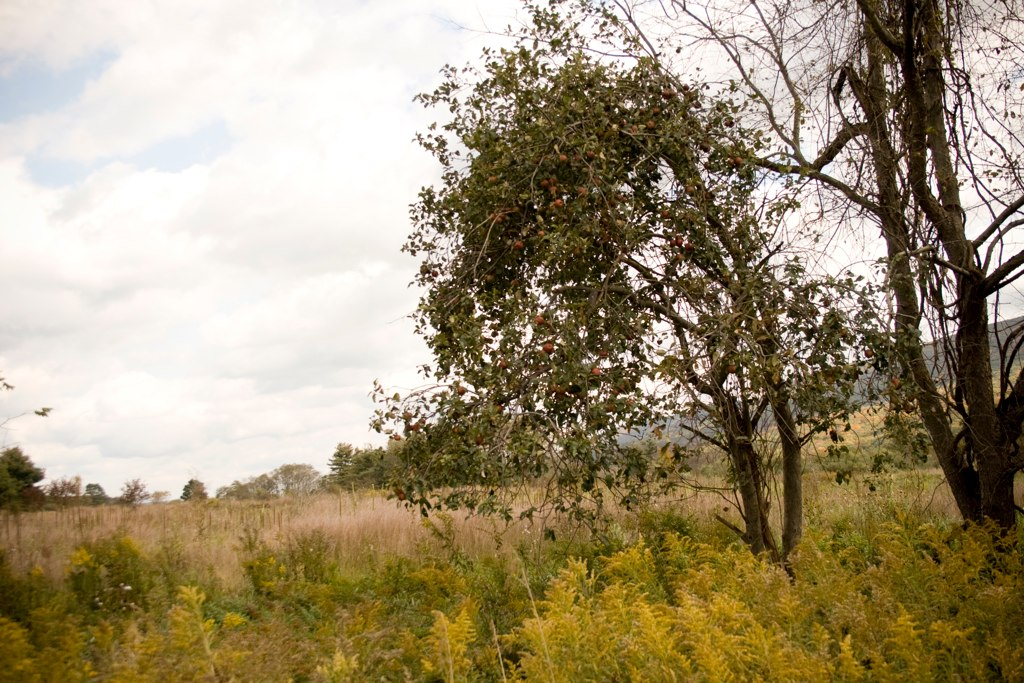
An apple tree and meadow at Bald Eagle State Park, October 2009

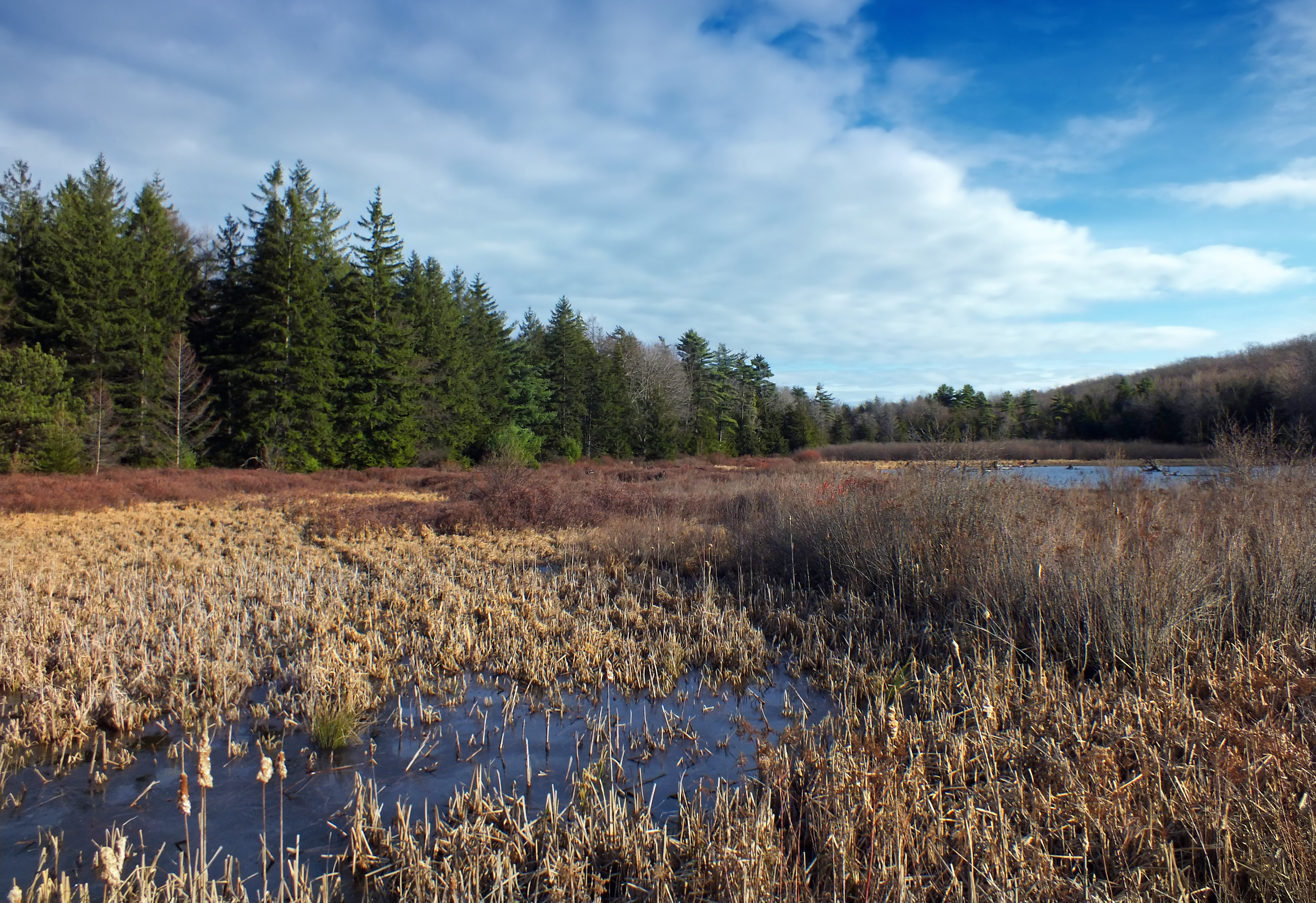
Black Moshannon State Park, December 2011

There are six Pennsylvania state parks in Centre County.

- Bald Eagle State Park is the largest state park in Centre County with 5,900-acre (2,400-hectare). It is on Pennsylvania Route 150 between Milesburg and Lock Haven.
- Black Moshannon State Park, west of State College has a bog with three species of carnivorous plants and 17 orchid varieties.
- McCalls Dam State Park is a small park on a dirt road in the easternmost area of the eastern tip of the county.
- Penn-Roosevelt State Park is the site of a former segregated CCC camp for African American men.
- Poe Paddy State Park is at the confluence of Big Poe Creek and Penns Creek.
- Poe Valley State Park is in an isolated valley surrounding 25 acre Poe Lake.

== Media ==
Centre County's main daily newspaper is the Centre Daily Times (part of the McClatchy Company chain). Alternative newspapers include the Centre County Gazette and State College City Guide. Newspapers of Pennsylvania State University's main campus include the student-run Daily Collegian. Magazines in the area include Town & Gown, State College Magazine, Good Life in Happy Valley, Blue White Illustrated, Pennsylvania Business Central, and Voices of Central Pennsylvania. The radio market of Centre County is ranked #257 in the nation. Some of the more popular stations include WPSU, WKPS, WZWW, WLEJ, WFGE, WNLI, WRSC-FM, WBHV, WOWY, and WBUS.

Centre County is part of the Johnstown/Altoona/State College television market, which is currently ranked #99 in the nation. Television stations broadcasting out of State College are WPSU (PBS) and WHVL-LD (MyNetworkTV) as well as C-NET, Centre County's Government and Education Access Television Network, which broadcasts on two channels: CGTV (Government Access TV) and CETV (Educational Access TV). Johnstown-based WJAC-TV (NBC) and Altoona-based WTAJ-TV (CBS) maintain satellite studios and offices.

== Communities ==
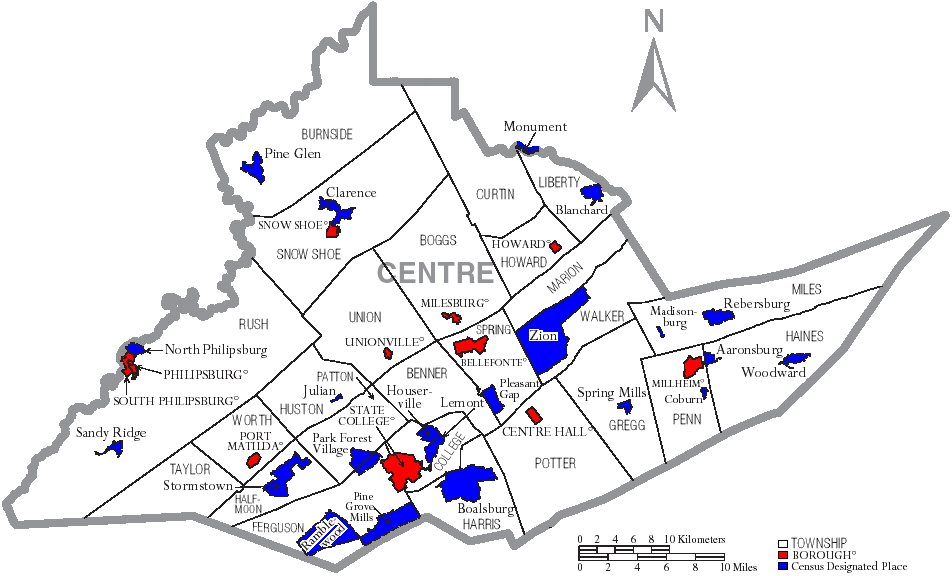
Map of Centre County, Pennsylvania with municipal labels showing boroughs (red), townships (white), and census-designated places (blue)

Under Pennsylvania law, there are five types of incorporated municipalities: cities, home rule municipalities, boroughs, townships, and in at most two cases, towns. These are the municipalities, boroughs and townships in Centre County:

=== Home rule municipalities ===
- Ferguson Township (Happy Valley)
- State College (Happy Valley)

=== Boroughs ===
- Bellefonte (county seat)
- Centre Hall
- Howard
- Milesburg
- Millheim
- Philipsburg
- Port Matilda
- Snow Shoe
- Unionville

=== Townships ===
- Benner
- Boggs
- Burnside
- College (Happy Valley)
- Curtin
- Ferguson (Happy Valley)
- Gregg
- Haines
- Halfmoon
- Harris (Happy Valley)
- Howard
- Huston
- Liberty
- Marion
- Miles
- Patton (Happy Valley)
- Penn
- Potter
- Rush
- Snow Shoe
- Spring
- Taylor
- Union
- Walker
- Worth

=== Census-designated places ===
Census-designated places are geographical areas designated by the U.S. Census Bureau for the purposes of compiling demographic data. They are not actual jurisdictions under Pennsylvania law. Other unincorporated communities, such as villages, may also be listed here.

- Aaronsburg
- Baileyville
- Blanchard
- Boalsburg
- Casanova
- Clarence
- Coburn
- Continental Courts
- Eagle Creek
- Eagleville
- Holters Crossing
- Houserville
- Hublersburg
- Jacksonville
- Julian
- Lemont
- Madisonburg
- Mingoville
- Monument
- Moose Run
- Moshannon
- Mount Eagle
- Nittany
- North Philipsburg
- Orviston
- Park Forest Village
- Peru
- Pine Glen
- Pine Grove Mills
- Pleasant Gap
- Potters Mills
- Ramblewood
- Rebersburg
- Runville
- Sandy Ridge
- Snydertown
- South Philipsburg
- Spring Mills
- Stormstown
- Toftrees
- Woodward
- Yarnell
- Zion

=== Other communities ===
- Axemann
- Cato
- Centennial
- Chemical
- Coleville
- Colyer
- Fillmore
- Fishermans Paradise
- Gatesburg
- Graysdale
- Gum Stump
- Ingleby (ghost town)
- Linden Hall
- Livonia
- Marengo
- Millbrook
- Oak Hall
- Old Fort
- Overlook Heights
- Panorama
- Penn Five
- Pine Hall
- Rock Springs
- Scotia (ghost town)
- Shingletown
- Skytop
- Spike Island
- Struble
- Tusseyville
- University Park
- Waddle
- Woodycrest

=== Population ranking ===
The population ranking of the following table is based on the 2010 census of Centre County.

† county seat

| Rank | City/Town/etc. | Municipal type | Population (2010 Census) |
|---|---|---|---|
| 1 | State College | Borough | 42,034 |
| 2 | Park Forest Village | CDP | 9,660 |
| 3 | † Bellefonte | Borough | 6,187 |
| 4 | Boalsburg | CDP | 3,722 |
| 5 | Pleasant Gap | CDP | 2,879 |
| 6 | Philipsburg | Borough | 2,770 |
| 7 | Stormstown | CDP | 2,366 |
| 8 | Lemont | CDP | 2,270 |
| 9 | Toftrees | CDP | 2,053 |
| 10 | Zion | CDP | 2,030 |
| 11 | Houserville | CDP | 1,814 |
| 12 | Pine Grove Mills | CDP | 1,502 |
| 13 | Centre Hall | Borough | 1,265 |
| 14 | Milesburg | Borough | 1,123 |
| 15 | Millheim | Borough | 904 |
| 16 | Ramblewood | CDP | 849 |
| 17 | Snow Shoe | Borough | 765 |
| 18 | Blanchard | CDP | 740 |
| 19 | Howard | Borough | 720 |
| 20 | North Philipsburg | CDP | 660 |
| 21 | Nittany | CDP | 658 |
| 22 | Clarence | CDP | 626 |
| 23 | Aaronsburg | CDP | 613 |
| 24 | Port Matilda | Borough | 606 |
| 25 | Mingoville | CDP | 503 |
| 26 | Rebersburg | CDP | 494 |
| 27 | Snydertown | CDP | 483 |
| 28 | South Philipsburg | CDP | 410 |
| 29 | Sandy Ridge | CDP | 407 |
| 30 | Eagleville | CDP | 324 |
| 31 | Unionville | Borough | 291 |
| 32 | Moshannon | CDP | 281 |
| 33 | Spring Mills | CDP | 268 |
| 34 | Coburn | CDP | 236 |
| 35 | Baileyville | CDP | 201 |
| 36 | Pine Glen | CDP | 190 |
| 37 | Madisonburg | CDP | 168 |
| 38 | Julian | CDP | 152 |
| 39 | Monument | CDP | 150 |
| 40 | Woodward | CDP | 110 |
| 41 | Hublersburg | CDP | 104 |
| 42 | Mount Eagle | CDP | 103 |
| T-43 | Jacksonville | CDP | 95 |
| T-43 | Orviston | CDP | 95 |

== See also ==
- National Register of Historic Places listings in Centre County, Pennsylvania
