= State college =

State College is a town in central Pennsylvania, United States.

State College may also refer to:

== Related to the town of State College, Pennsylvania ==
- State College Area School District, a school district serving State College
- State College Area High School, a high school inside State College
- State College Spikes, a minor league baseball team based in State College
- State College, PA Metropolitan Statistical Area
- State College-DuBois, PA Combined Statistical Area

== In Australia ==
=== Secondary schools in Queensland ===
- Capalaba State College
- Chancellor State College
- Earnshaw State College
- Innisfail State College
- Kawana Waters State College
- Kelvin Grove State College
- Meridan State College
- North Lakes State College
- Spinifex State College

== In Dominica ==
- Dominica State College

== In Ghana ==
- Abuakwa State College, a secondary school

== In Indonesia ==
- Indonesian State College of Accountancy

== In Nigeria ==
- Ogun State College of Health Technology
- Nasarawa State College of Education, Akwanga
- Rivers State College of Arts and Science, now Port Harcourt Polytechnic
- Rivers State College of Health Science and Technology

== In the Philippines ==
- Multiple State Colleges in the Philippines, most of which award graduate degrees in at least one academic area

=== Institutions formerly named "State College" ===
- Cebu State College, now Cebu Normal University, in the Philippines
- Mindanao Polytechnic State College, now University of Science and Technology of Southern Philippines
- Rizal State College, now University of Rizal System

== In the United States ==
=== Institutions offering bachelor's degrees ===
- Bluefield State College, in West Virginia
- Charter Oak State College, in Connecticut
- Evergreen State College, in Washington state
- State colleges in the University System of Georgia
- Glenville State College, in West Virginia
- Johnson State College, in Vermont
- Keene State College, in New Hampshire
- Lewis-Clark State College, in Idaho
- Lyndon State College, in Vermont
- Palm Beach State College, in Florida
- State colleges in the Nebraska State College System
- Nevada State College
- State colleges in the University System of New Hampshire
- State colleges in the State University of New York

=== Community colleges offering a limited number of bachelor's degrees ===
- Bismarck State College, in North Dakota
- State colleges in the Florida College System

=== Community colleges offering associate degrees ===
- Carl Albert State College, in Oklahoma
- Connors State College, in Oklanoma
- James A. Rhodes State College, in Ohio
- Lake Region State College, in North Dakota
- Lamar State College–Port Arthur, in Texas
- Lamar State College–Orange, in Texas
- Murray State College, in Oklahoma
- North Central State College, in Ohio
- North Dakota State College of Science
- Potomac State College of West Virginia University
- Prairie State College, in Illinois
- Rose State College, in Oklahoma
- Seminole State College (Oklahoma)
- Stark State College, in Ohio
- Western Oklahoma State College
- Williston State College, in North Dakota
- Zane State College, in Ohio

=== Institutions formerly named "State College" ===
- Armstrong State College, now the Armstrong campus of Georgia Southern University
- Bainbridge State College, merged into Abraham Baldwin Agricultural College (ABAC)
- Bay State College, defunct
- Boston State College, now part of the University of Massachusetts Boston
- Cameron State College, now Cameron University, in Oklahoma
- Castleton State College, now Castleton University, in Vermont
- Clarion State College, now Clarion University of Pennsylvania
- Central State College, now University of Central Oklahoma
- Central Washington State College, now Central Washington University
- Connecticut State College, now University of Connecticut
- Darton State College, now The Darton College of Health Professions at Albany State University, in Georgia
- East Central State College, now East Central University, in Oklahoma
- Edinboro State College, now Edinboro University of Pennsylvania
- Eastern Oregon State College, now Eastern Oregon University
- Eastern Washington State College, now Eastern Washington University
- Fitchburg State College, now Fitchburg State University, Massachusetts
- Framingham State College, now Framingham State University, Massachusetts
- Gainesville State College, now part of University of North Georgia
- Glassboro State College, now Rowan University, in New Jersey
- Indiana State College, now Indiana University of Pennsylvania
- Kearney State College, now University of Nebraska at Kearney
- Lamar State College, now Lamar University, in Texas
- Lowell State College, now part of University of Massachusetts Lowell
- Macon State College, now part of Middle Georgia State University
- Maine State College, now University of Maine
- Mansfield State College, now Mansfield University of Pennsylvania
- Two institutions named Maryland State College:
  - From 1916 to 1920, now University of Maryland, College Park
  - From 1948 to 1970, now University of Maryland Eastern Shore
- Memphis State College, now University of Memphis, in Tennessee
- Mesa State College, now Colorado Mesa University
- Mississippi State College for Women, now Mississippi University for Women-Milwaukee
- New Hampshire State College, now University of New Hampshire
- New York State College for Teachers, now University at Albany - State University of New York
- North Texas State College, now University of North Texas
- North Adams State College, now Massachusetts College of Liberal Arts
- Pennsylvania State College, now Pennsylvania State University
- Prairie View State College, now Prairie View A&M University, in Texas
- Salem State College, now Salem State University, Massachusetts
- Shippensburg State College, now Shippensburg University of Pennsylvania
- Two institutions named Southern State College:
  - From 1951 to 1976, now Southern Arkansas University
  - From 1964 to 1971, now University of South Dakota-Springfield
- Southern Utah State College, now Southern Utah University
- State College of Iowa, now the University of Northern Iowa
- State College of Physicians and Surgeons of Indiana, now Indiana University School of Medicine
- State College of Washington, now Washington State University
- Stockton State College, now Stockton University, in New Jersey
- Texas State College for Women, now Texas Woman's University
- Towson State College, now Towson University, in Maryland
- Troy State College, Troy University in Alabama
- Utah Valley State College, now Utah Valley State University
- West Liberty State College, now West Liberty University, in West Virginia
- Western Kentucky State College, now Western Kentucky University
- Western Oregon State College, now Western Oregon University
- Western State College, now Western Colorado University
- Western Washington State College, now Western Washington University
- Westfield State College, now Westfield State University, Massachusetts
- Wisconsin State College, now part of University of Wisconsin System
- Wisconsin State College of Milwaukee, now University of Wisconsin-Milwaukee
- Worcester State College, now Worcester State University, Massachusetts
- Multiple schools that became part of the California State University

== See also ==
- State university, a type of educational institution
- State university (disambiguation)
