= Millbrook, Pennsylvania =

Unincorporated community in Pennsylvania, US

- Unincorporated community
- Location within the U.S. state of Pennsylvania Millbrook (the United States)
- Coordinates: 40°48′48.4″N 77°50′20.1″W
- Country: United States
- State: Pennsylvania
- County: Centre
- Township: College
- Time zone: UTC-5 (Eastern (EST))
  - Summer (DST): UTC-4 (EDT)
- ZIP code: 16801

Millbrook (also Puddintown) is a neighborhood and an unincorporated community in College Township, Centre County, Pennsylvania, United States. It is part of Happy Valley and the larger Nittany Valley.

== Etymology ==
The name "Puddintown" derives from a local family that liked boiled and seasoned white pudding.

== Geography ==
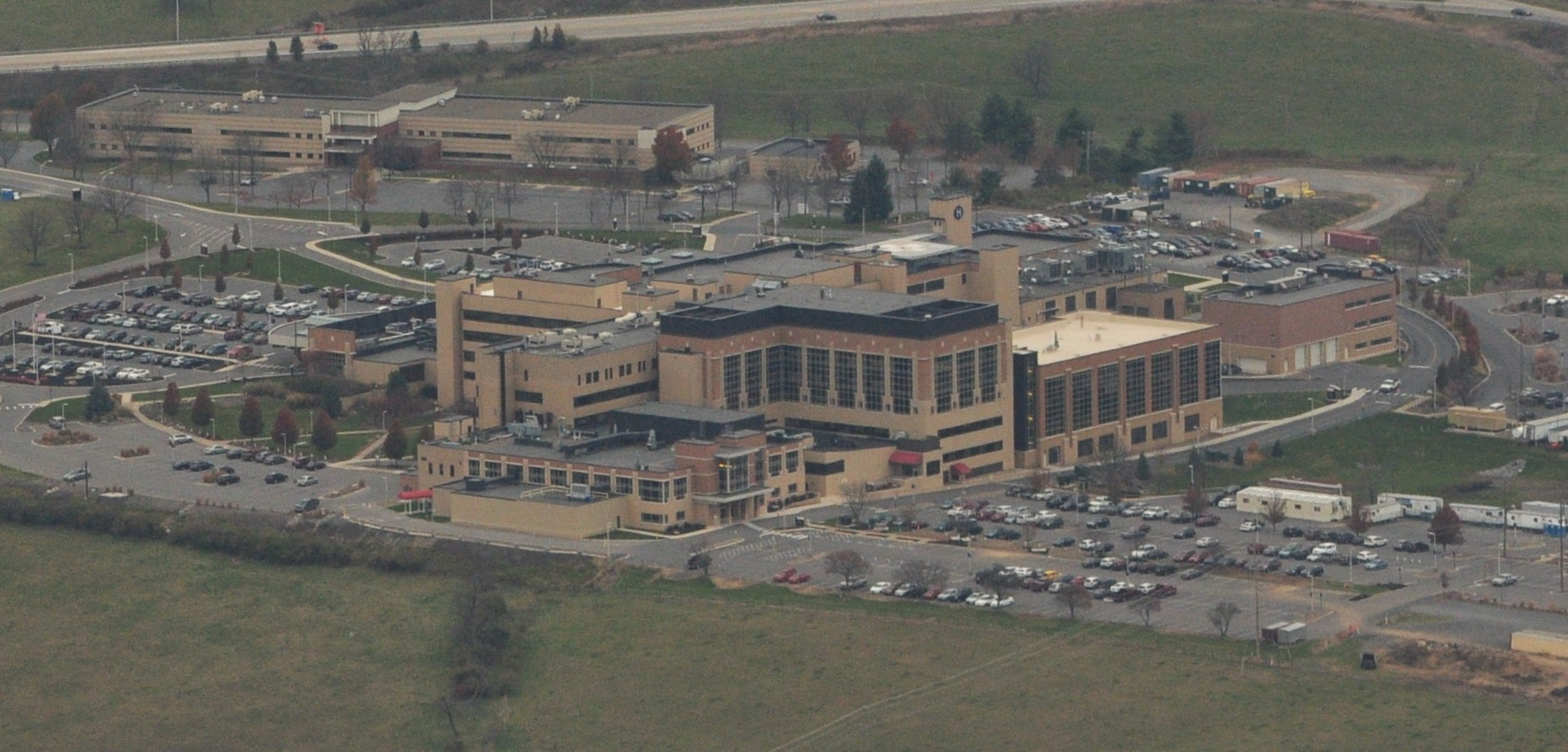
Mount Nittany Medical Center

Millbrook is north of Squirrel Hill, west of Houserville, and east of University Park. The portion of the neighborhood adjacent to Pennsylvania Route 26, locally known as East College Avenue, is zoned as a gateway commercial district. The district is home to the Centre Furnace, Centre County Historical Society, three hotels, Alpha Fire Company, and the College Township Municipal Building, among other businesses, offices, and houses. The northern section of Puddintown is home to the Mount Nittany Medical Center.

Puddintown is also home to the Houserville, the Tudek archeological sites, and the 50-acre Millbrook Marsh. The marsh is part of the Houserville Site, which was a prehistoric stone workshop Native Americans used ten thousand years ago. Bathgate Springs, Slab Cabin Run, and Thompson Run all flow through the marsh.

Puddintown is served by the College Avenue Connector operated by CATA which runs from Cato to Shiloh via Downtown.
