= Houserville, Pennsylvania =

Unincorporated community in Pennsylvania, US

- Census-designated place
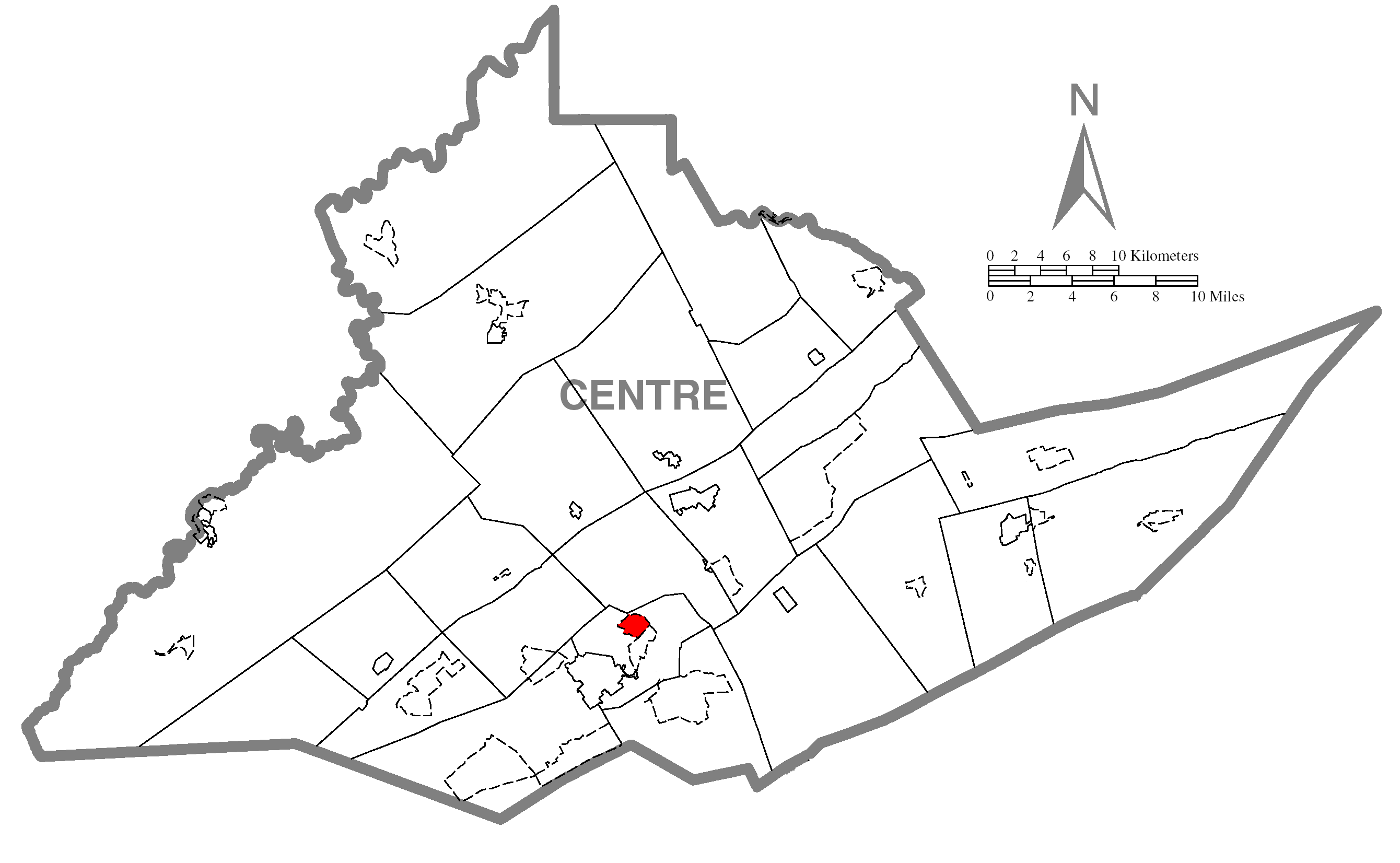
- Location within Centre County

- Location within the U.S. state of Pennsylvania Houserville (the United States)
- Coordinates: 40°49′41″N 77°49′42″W
- Country: United States
- State: Pennsylvania
- County: Centre
- Township: College

Area
  - Total: 1.10 sq mi (2.84 km^{2})
  - Land: 1.10 sq mi (2.84 km^{2})
  - Water: 0 sq mi (0.00 km^{2})
- Elevation: 980 ft (300 m)

Population (2020)
  - Total: 1,978
  - Density: 1,806.9/sq mi (697.65/km^{2})
- Time zone: UTC-5 (Eastern (EST))
  - Summer (DST): UTC-4 (EDT)
- ZIP code: 16801
- Area code: 814
- FIPS code: 42-35888
- GNIS feature ID: 1177510

Houserville is an unincorporated community and census-designated place (CDP) in Centre County, Pennsylvania, United States. It is part of the State College, Pennsylvania Metropolitan Statistical Area. The population was 1,814 at the 2010 census.

== History ==
Two archaeological sites, known as the Houserville and Tudek sites, are located between Houserville and State College. Once used in the production of stone tools, the sites may be 10,000 years old. Both are listed on the National Register of Historic Places.

Houserville is named after Jacob Houser, who settled in the village in 1788. Houser owned a woolen mill and factory in the area that produced blankets and fabrics and shipped its products as far as Baltimore until 1912.

== Geography ==
Houserville is located in southern Centre County at 40°49′41″N 77°49′42″W (40.828129, -77.828301), in the northern part of College Township. It is bordered to the south by the community of Lemont, also in College Township.

Houserville is 3 miles (5 km) northeast of the center of the borough of State College. Interstate 99 and U.S. Route 322 merge just to the west of Houserville; the most direct access to the highways is from Pennsylvania Route 26 in Lemont.

According to the United States Census Bureau, the Houserville CDP has a total area of 1.10 square miles (2.84 km^{2}), all land. Spring Creek forms the western edge of the CDP, flowing northward towards Bald Eagle Creek, a tributary of the West Branch Susquehanna River.

== Demographics ==
Historical population
Census	Pop.	Note	%±
2020	1,978		—
U.S. Decennial Census

As of the census of 2010, there were 1,814 people, 734 households, and 508 families residing in the CDP. The population density was 1,677.9 people per square mile (647.8 people/km^{2}). There were 759 housing units at an average density of 694.4 per square mile (268.1/km^{2}). The racial makeup of the CDP was 92.9% White, 1.9% Black or African American, 1.8% Asian, 0.5% from other races, and 2.9% from two or more races. Hispanic or Latino of any race were 1.5% of the population.

There were 734 households, out of which 31.3% had children under the age of 18 living with them, 60.1% were married couples living together, 2.2% had a male householder with no wife present, 6.9% had a female householder with no husband present, and 30.8% were non-families. 23.8% of all households were made up of individuals, and 5.6% had someone living alone who was 65 years of age or older. The average household size was 2.47 and the average family size was 2.99.

In the CDP, the population was spread out, with 22.4% under the age of 18, 7.5% from 18 to 24, 30.0% from 25 to 44, 30.1% from 45 to 64, and 10.0% who were 65 years of age or older. The median age was 39 years. For every 100 females, there were 101.3 males. For every 100 females age 18 and over, there were 101.3 males.

The median income for a household in the CDP was $57,976, and the median income for a family was $72,981. The per capita income for the CDP was $29,246. About 2.6% of families and 4.3% of the population were below the poverty line, including 7.3% of those under age 18 and none of those age 65 or over.

== Transportation ==
Houserville is along the College Avenue Connector bus route which is operated by the Centre Area Transportation Authority.

Pennsylvania Route 26 marks the border between Houserville and Lemont.

== Education ==
Houserville is part of the State College Area School District. The village is served by the Mount Nittany Middle School in Panorama and State High in Parkway.

In 2019 the Spring Creek Elementary School opened in Houserville.
