= Lemont, Pennsylvania =

Unincorporated community in Pennsylvania, US

- Census-designated place
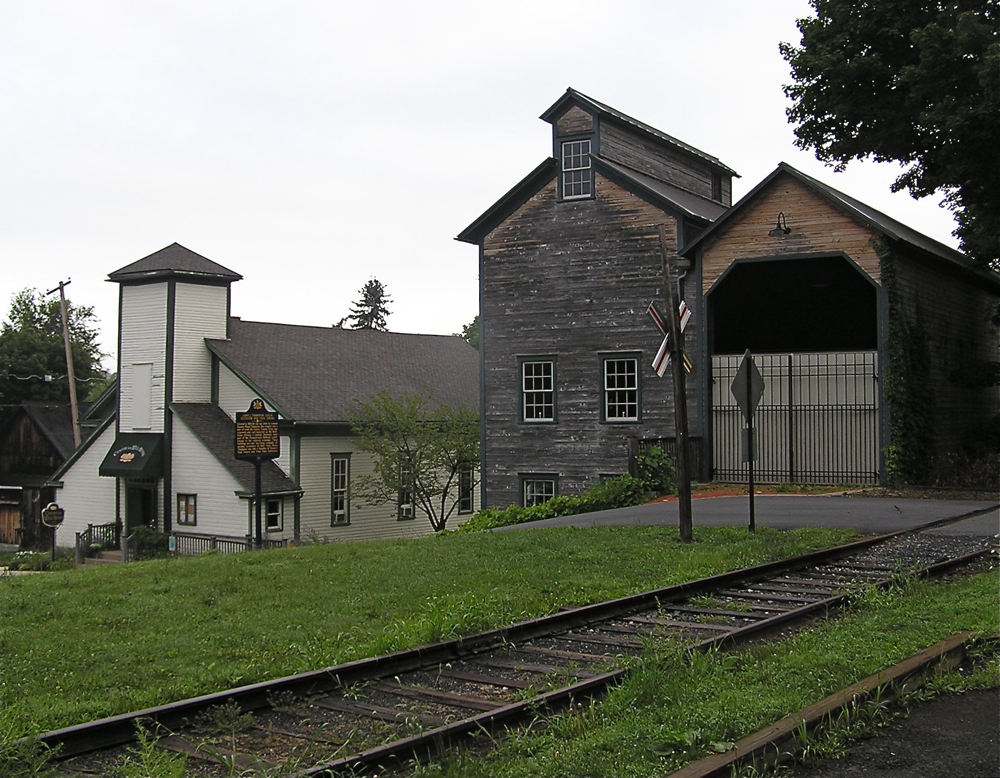
- John I. Thompson Grain Elevator and Coal Sheds in Lemont
- Nickname: "The End of the Mountain"
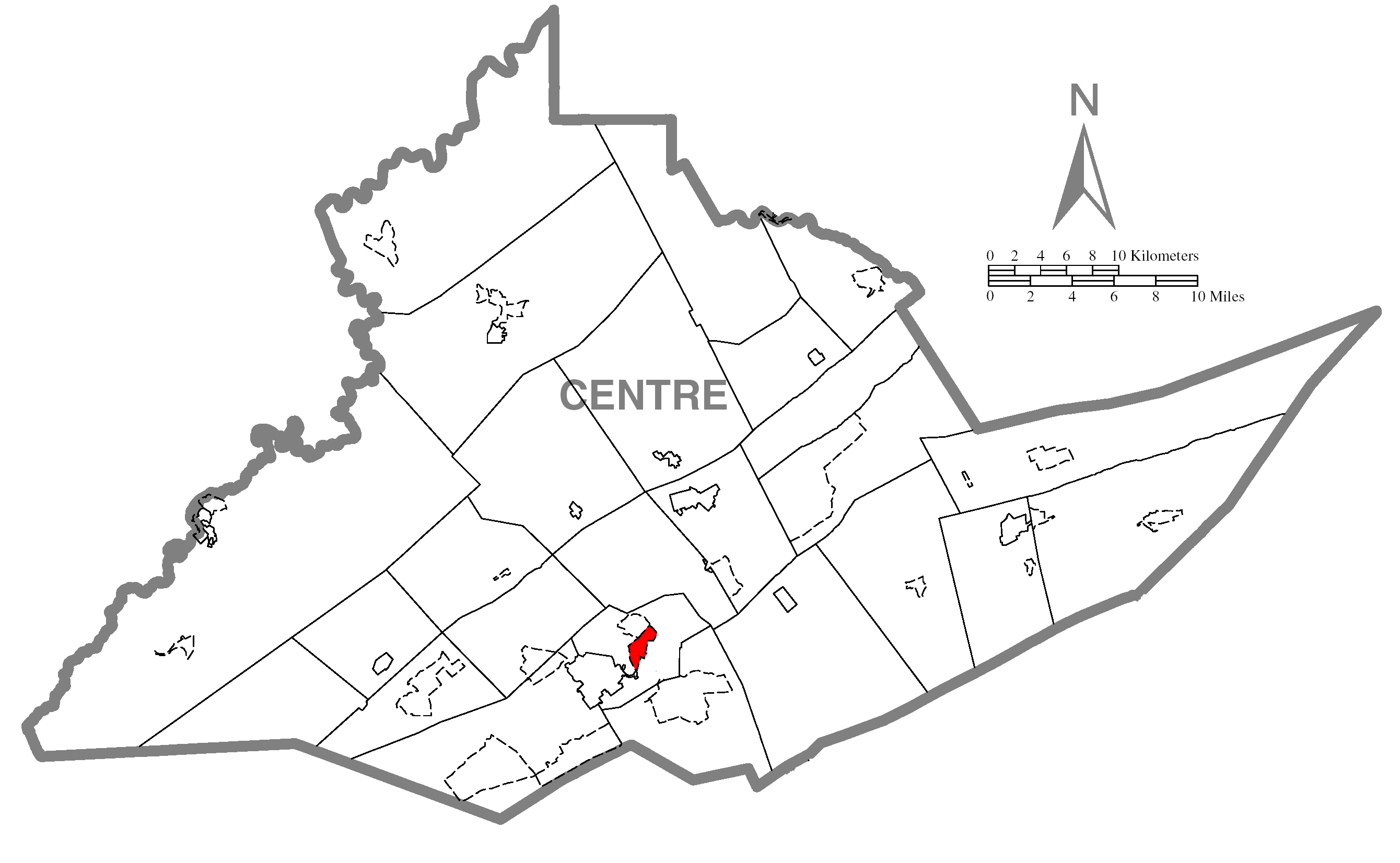
- Location of Lemont in Centre County, Pennsylvania

- Location within the U.S. state of Pennsylvania Lemont (the United States)
- Coordinates: 40°48′36″N 77°49′5″W
- Country: United States
- State: Pennsylvania
- County: Centre
- Township: College

Area
  - Total: 1.25 sq mi (3.23 km^{2})
  - Land: 1.25 sq mi (3.23 km^{2})
  - Water: 0 sq mi (0.00 km^{2})
- Elevation: 1,046 ft (319 m)

Population (2020)
  - Total: 2,276
  - Density: 1,827.4/sq mi (705.58/km^{2})
- Time zone: UTC-5 (Eastern (EST))
  - Summer (DST): UTC-4 (EDT)
- ZIP Code: 16851
- Area code: 814
- FIPS code: 42-42632
- GNIS feature ID: 1198221

Lemont is a census-designated place in College Township, Pennsylvania, United States, within the State College–DuBois combined statistical area. The population was 2,270 as of the 2010 census. Nicknamed "The End of the Mountain," the village sits at the base of Mount Nittany, along Spring Creek. Lemont is two miles away from State College and the main campus of the Pennsylvania State University. It is part of Happy Valley and the larger Nittany Valley, as well as the State College–DuBois combined statistical area.

Lemont is home to the John I. Thompson Grain Elevator and Coal Sheds, the last remaining granary in Pennsylvania. It is part of the Lemont Historic District. Public transit is serviced by the Centre Area Transportation Authority.

== History ==
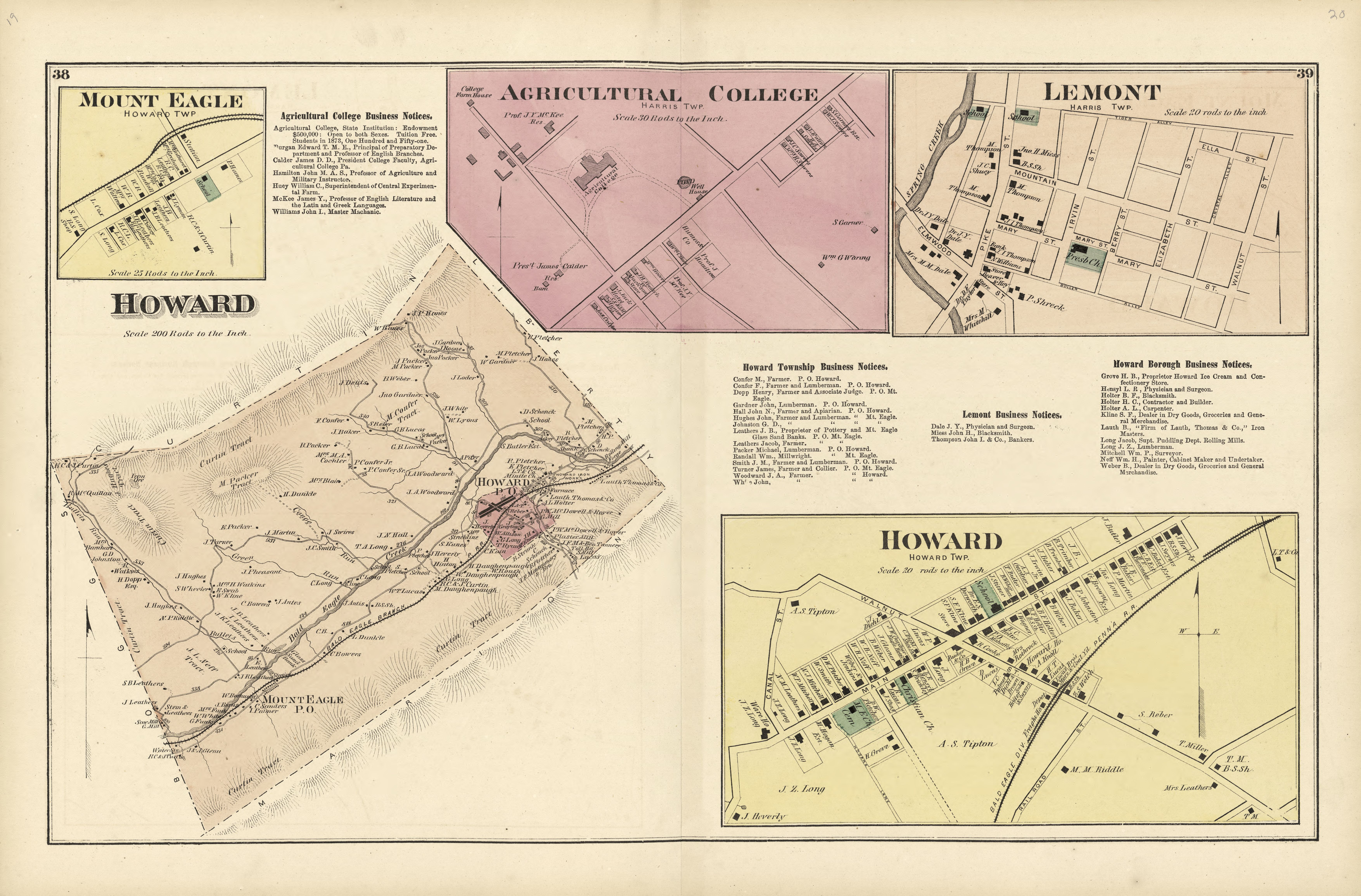
Atlas of Lemont, 1874

The first inhabitants of the area came towards the end of the last glacial period. They lived a nomadic hunter-gatherer lifestyle for thousands of years. Nearby archaeological sites suggest campsites and jasper mines have been in the area since approximately 8000 to 3500 BC. The Lenape, Haudenosaunee, Mingo, and Shawnee were among the native inhabitants who began establishing settlements, farms, and trails throughout the surrounding valleys.

James Potter led the first recorded expedition of Spring Creek in 1764. Upon reaching an overlook on Mount Nittany, he exclaimed "By heavens, Thompson, I have discovered an empire!" The first Europeans to settle in present-day Lemont arrived in 1789, setting up farms, a grist mill, and a saw mill.

The land that would make up the village, historically known as “The End of the Mountain,” was bought by Centre Furnace ironmaster Moses Thompson in 1870. As the iron industry flourished in Centre County, so to did the Bellefonte Central Railroad. Lemont was given its French name as a train station between Bellefonte and Lewisburg in 1885. Although a plan to extend a line from Lemont to Scotia via State College never came to fruition, students, faculty, and visitors would use Lemont's train station, and catch a buggy to connect to State College or University Park. Lemont would grow as a prominent railway town and crossroads between the Penns and Nittany Valleys with a bank, blacksmith, general store, school, hotels, and churches opening up along the main streets.

In Spring of 1885 the Lemont Hotel, owned by Thompson's son, burned down. The insurance money he acquired was used to build the John I. Thompson Grain Elevator and Coal Sheds. As trucking was replacing freight hauling the granary shut down in the 1950s. In the 1970s a Penn State student doing a study of Lemont wrote "The once very important buildings have been neglected and deteriorating." The Lemont Historic District was added to the National Register of Historic Places in 1979. In 1994 the Lemont Village Association purchased the lot for preservation.

== Culture ==
The Art Alliance of Central Pennsylvania was formed in 1968, and has been housed in the former home of the Lemont Band ever since.

The Lemont Village Green hosts many community events, including small concerts and the Strawberry Festival a tradition dating back to 1982. The festival attracted 1,000 visitors in 2024 and featured railroad speeder rides on the historic tracks.

== Geography ==
Lemont sits at the end of Mount Nittany which is part of the geologic ridge-and-valley province of the Appalachian Mountains. Spring Creek, a northward-flowing tributary of Bald Eagle Creek part of the larger Susquehanna River watershed, connects the village to Houserville and Rock Forges to the north, and Oak Hall and Boalsburg to the south.

== Sports ==
The village is represented by the Lemont Ducks, although the Ducks play at the Community Fields in State College. The team is a part of the Centre County Baseball League, Pennsylvania's oldest amateur baseball league, which began in 1932. Spencer Bivens played for the Lemont Ducks for a time before signing to the San Francisco Giants in Major League Baseball.

== Demographics ==
Historical population
Census	Pop.	Note	%±
2020	2,276		—
U.S. Decennial Census

As of the census of 2020, there were 2,276 people, 996 housing units, and 951 families residing in the CDP. The population density was 1,837.3 people per square mile (709.4 people/km^{2}). The racial makeup of the CDP was 84.7% White, 2.4% Black or African American, 0.4% Native American, 3.5% Asian, 0.2% from other races, and 4.9% from two or more races. Hispanic or Latino of any race were 4.1% of the population.

There were 951 households, out of which 18.8% had children under the age of 18 living with them, 53.8% were married couples living together, 3.5% had a male householder with no wife present, 7.0% had a female householder with no husband present, and 35.7% were non-families. 25.2% of all households were made up of individuals, and 20% had someone living alone who was 65 years of age or older. The average household size was 2.45 and the average family size was 3.00.

In the CDP, the population was spread out, with 22.1% under the age of 18, 8.4% from 18 to 24, 27.4% from 25 to 44, 31.0% from 45 to 64, and 11.1% who were 65 years of age or older. The median age was 39 years. For every 100 females, there were 100.2 males. For every 100 females age 18 and over, there were 103.9 males.

The median income for a household in the CDP was $63,945, and the median income for a family was $94,383. The per capita income for the CDP was $44,550. About 3.6% of families and 8.6% of the population were below the poverty line, including 6.4% of those under age 18 and none of those age 65 or over.

== Transportation ==
The Centre Area Transportation Authority (CATA) operates the College Avenue Connector, a fixed bus route which connects Lemont to State College and Ferguson Township. In 2024, CATA planned to replace the fixed route with an on-demand service for Lemont and Houserville. CATA decided to keep both the fixed and on-demand services after locals complained.

Highways include:

- U.S. Route 322 Business, locally known as the Mount Nittany Expressway.
- Pennsylvania Route 26

== Education ==
Lemont is part of the State College Area School District. The village is served by Mount Nittany Middle School and the State College Area High School.

The Lemont Elementary School was built in 1938. In 2019 the Spring Creek Elementary School opened in Houserville to serve both Houserville and Lemont. In 2021 the former Lemont Elementary School building was sold to New Story Schools, a private school which focuses on students with behavioral and educational difficulties.
