= James W. Hatch Archaeological Site =

James Hatch Site
- Site 36CE0544
- Satellite of: Tudek Site
- Location: Along the Puddintown Road Bike Trail in College Township, Centre County, Pennsylvania

Site notes
- Excavation dates: May 2017

The James W. Hatch Archeological Site (36CE0544) is an archaeological site in Centre County, Pennsylvania, United States.

== History ==
The nearby Tudek Site, a jasper quarry, was initially recorded in the 1970s during regional surveys conducted by Penn State University and led by professor James W. Hatch. In 2015, PennDOT initiated archaeological surveys in advance of a bike trail project along Puddintown Road in College Township. Phase I and Phase II surveys met criteria to establish a Trinomial Site Number and led to its official naming after James Hatch. In May 2017, the PennDOT Highway Archaeological Survey Team (PHAST) and Juniata College conducted an excavation which revealed thousands of stone artifacts—mostly debitage—but also stone tools and two hammerstones. Because of its relation to the Tudek Quarry, the James Hatch site was eligible for a National Register of Historic Places designation.
