= Centre Furnace Mansion House =

Historic house in Pennsylvania, United States

- Centre Furnace Mansion
- U.S. National Register of Historic Places
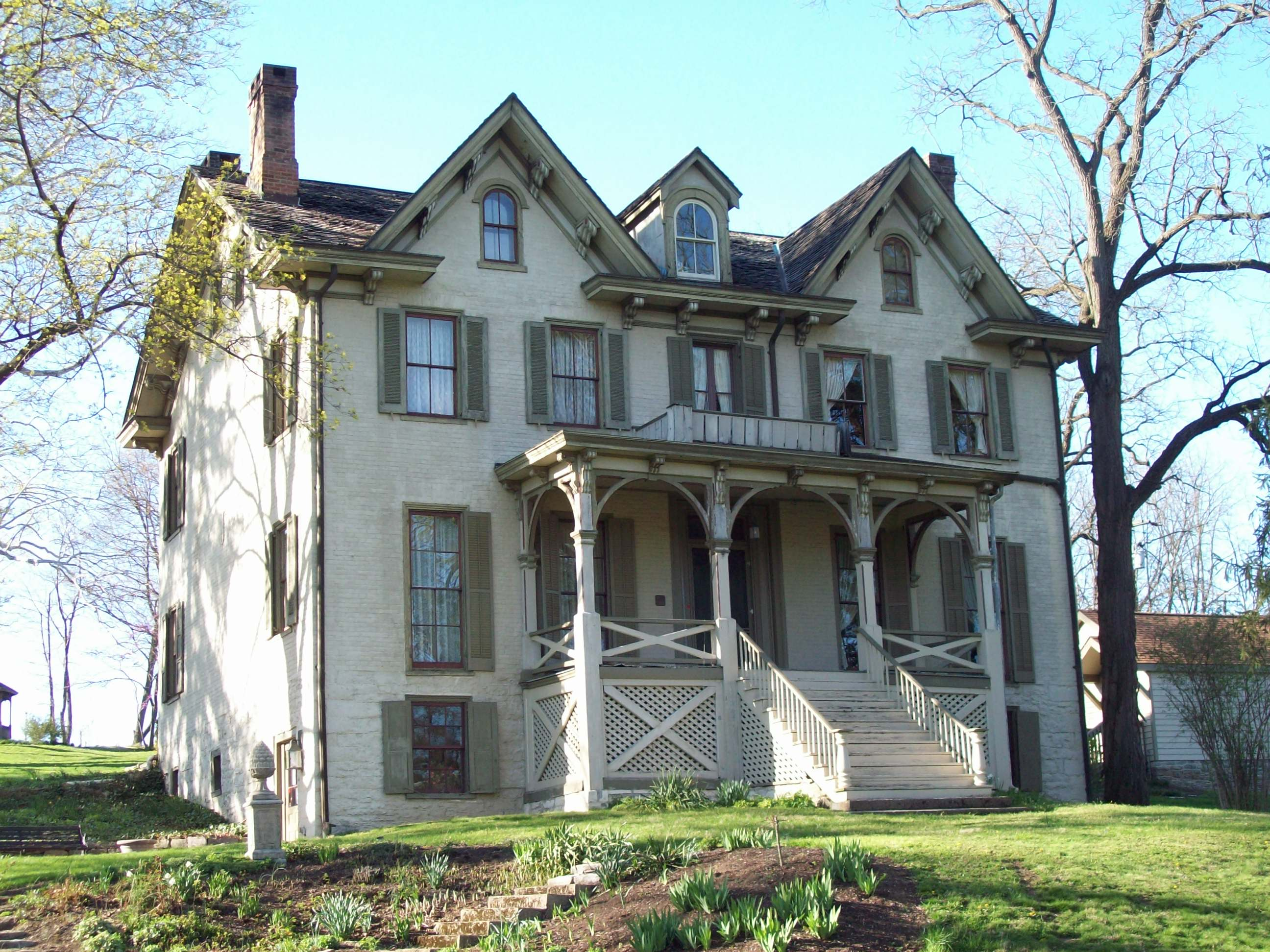
- Centre Furnace Mansion House, April 2012

- Location within Pennsylvania Location within the United States
- Location: 1001 E College Ave, State College, Pennsylvania
- Coordinates: 40°48′23″N 77°50′33″W
- Area: 3.5 acres (1.4 ha)
- Built: 1830
- Architectural style: Late Victorian, Georgian
- NRHP reference No.: 79002193
- Added to NRHP: December 27, 1979

The Centre Furnace Mansion is listed on the National Register of Historic Places and is the headquarters of the Centre County Historical Society, located in College Township, Pennsylvania. The Mansion, the ironmaster's residence for Centre Furnace, has been restored and is furnished to reflect the period of residency of ironmaster Moses Thompson and his family, 1842–1891. A mansion in miniature, identical to the original and scaled one inch to one foot, is on permanent display. This mansion and nearby iron furnace stack represent the 18th century beginnings of the charcoal iron industry in the central Pennsylvania area, and the 19th century beginnings of the Pennsylvania State University.

Centre Furnace site includes the Centre Furnace Mansion, furnace stack, and surrounding eight acres. This National Register site represents a small portion of the late 18th-century ironmaking village once located here. Its interpretation is based on historical documentation and archaeological research, and includes carefully landscaped grounds with walkways and period gardens.

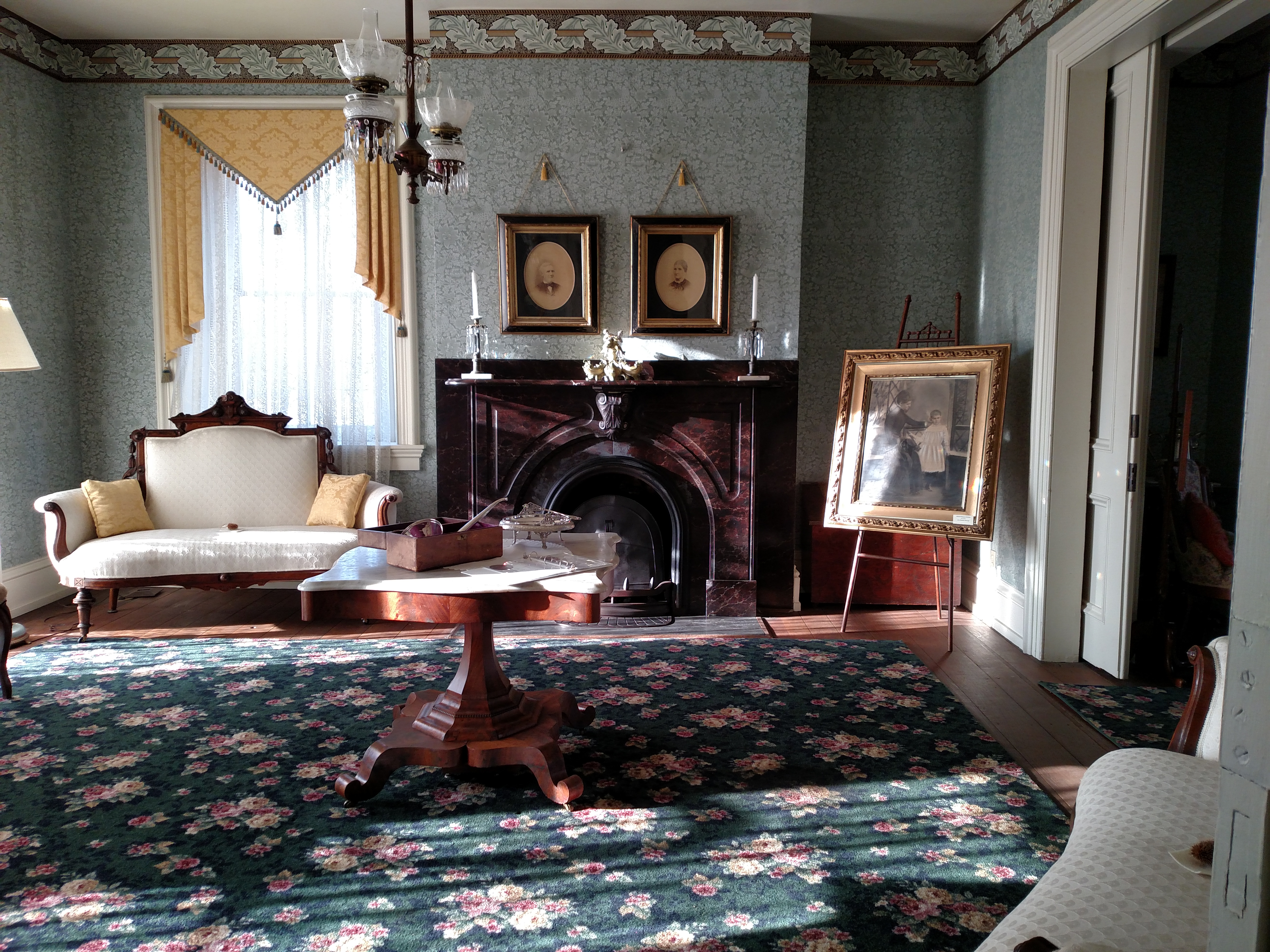
Moses Parlor in the Centre Furnace Mansion

The Mansion is home to various exhibits, programs, and fundraisers throughout the year.

Mansion Tours are open between 1 PM and 4 PM on Sunday, Wednesday, Friday by reservation. Each tour takes approximately one hour. The CCHS office is closed with no tours the week between Christmas and New Year's.

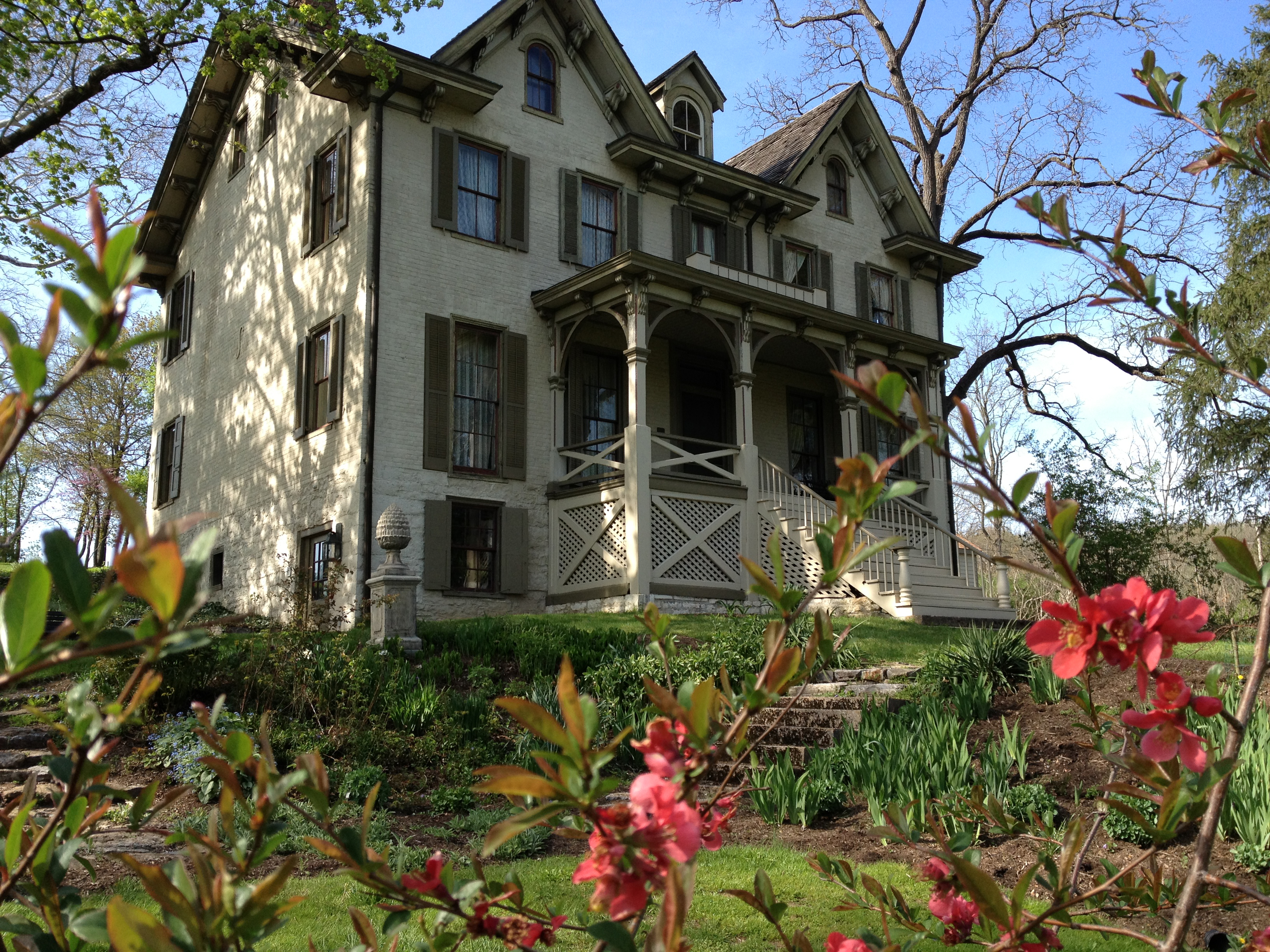
