= Delaware Line =

Colonial military unit in the American Revolutionary War

The Delaware Line was a formation within the Continental Army during the American Revolutionary War. The term "Delaware Line" referred to the quota of one infantry regiment which was assigned to Delaware at various times by the Continental Congress. This, together with similar contingents from the other twelve states, formed the Continental Line. The concept was particularly important in relation to the promotion of commissioned officers. Officers of the Continental Army below the rank of brigadier general were ordinarily ineligible for promotion except in the line of their own state.

Not all Continental infantry regiments raised in a state were part of a state quota, however. On December 27, 1776, the Continental Congress gave George Washington temporary control over certain military decisions that the Congress ordinarily regarded as its own prerogative. These "dictatorial powers" included the authority to raise sixteen additional Continental infantry regiments at large.

Early in 1777, Washington offered command of one of these additional regiments to John Patton of Pennsylvania, who accepted. McLane's Company, originally in Patton's Regiment, was drawn from Delaware.

Grayson's, Hartley's, and Patton's Regiments were also partially drawn from Delaware.

Still other Continental infantry regiments and smaller units, also unrelated to a state quota, were raised as needed for special or temporary service.

The Delaware Regiment was a part of the Continental Army.
