= Centre Furnace =

- U.S. National Register of Historic Places
- Pennsylvania state historical marker
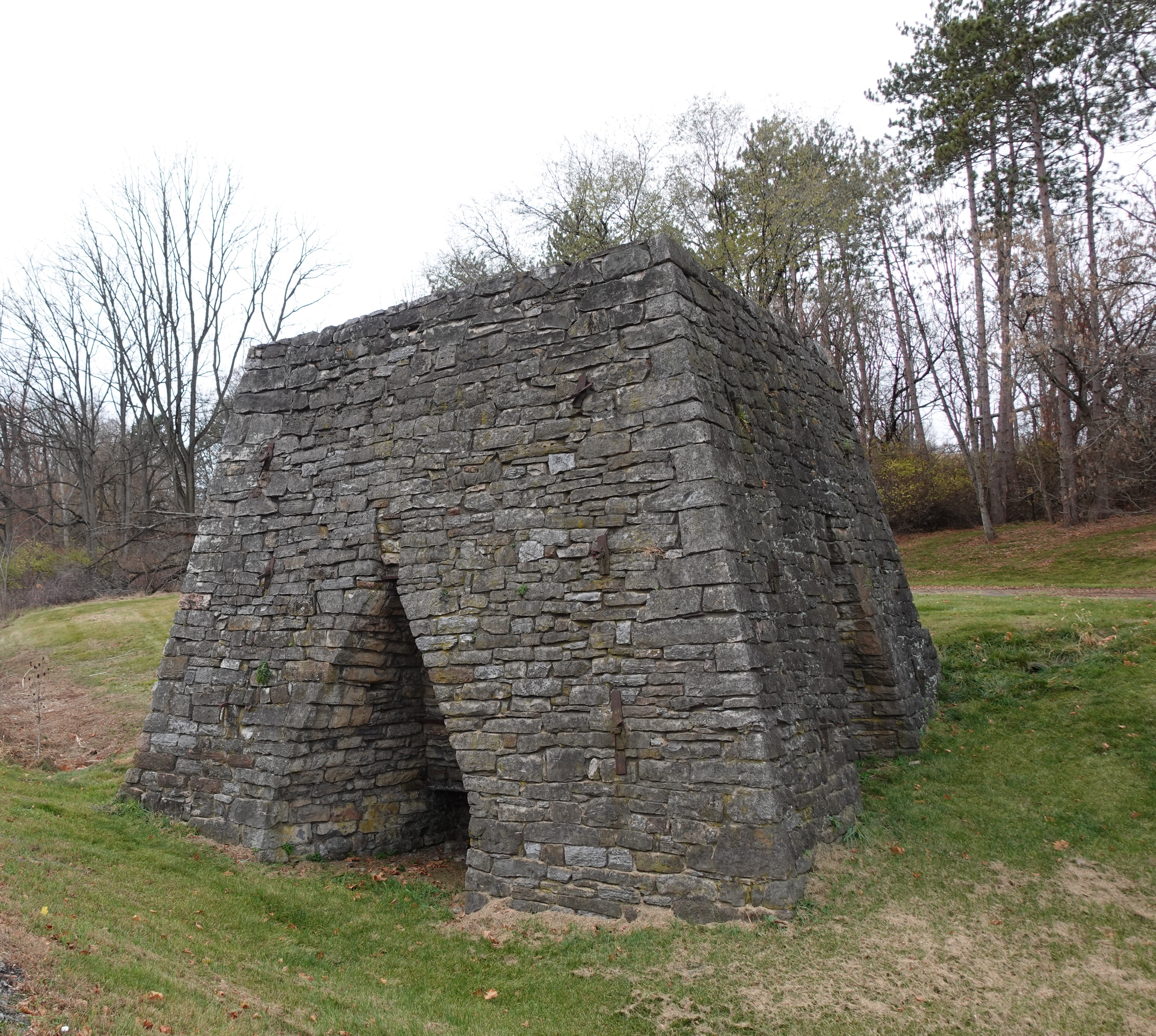
- Centre Furnace

- Location within Pennsylvania Location within the United States
- Location: Millbrook, College Township, Pennsylvania
- Coordinates: 40°48′19.1″N 77°50′35.7″W
- Area: less than one acre
- Built: 1790-91
- Architectural style: Iron furnace
- MPS: Iron and Steel Resources of Pennsylvania MPS
- NRHP reference No.: 91001131
- Added to NRHP: 1979

Centre Furnace is an iron furnace located in College Township, Centre County, in the Nittany Valley. It was the first charcoal iron furnace built west of the Susquehanna River in 1790-91 by war generals Samuel Miles and John Patton. The furnace was central to the development of the Nittany Valley. The furnace is across Porter Road from the Centre Furnace Mansion House.

The furnace is the namesake for Centre County.

== Gallery ==
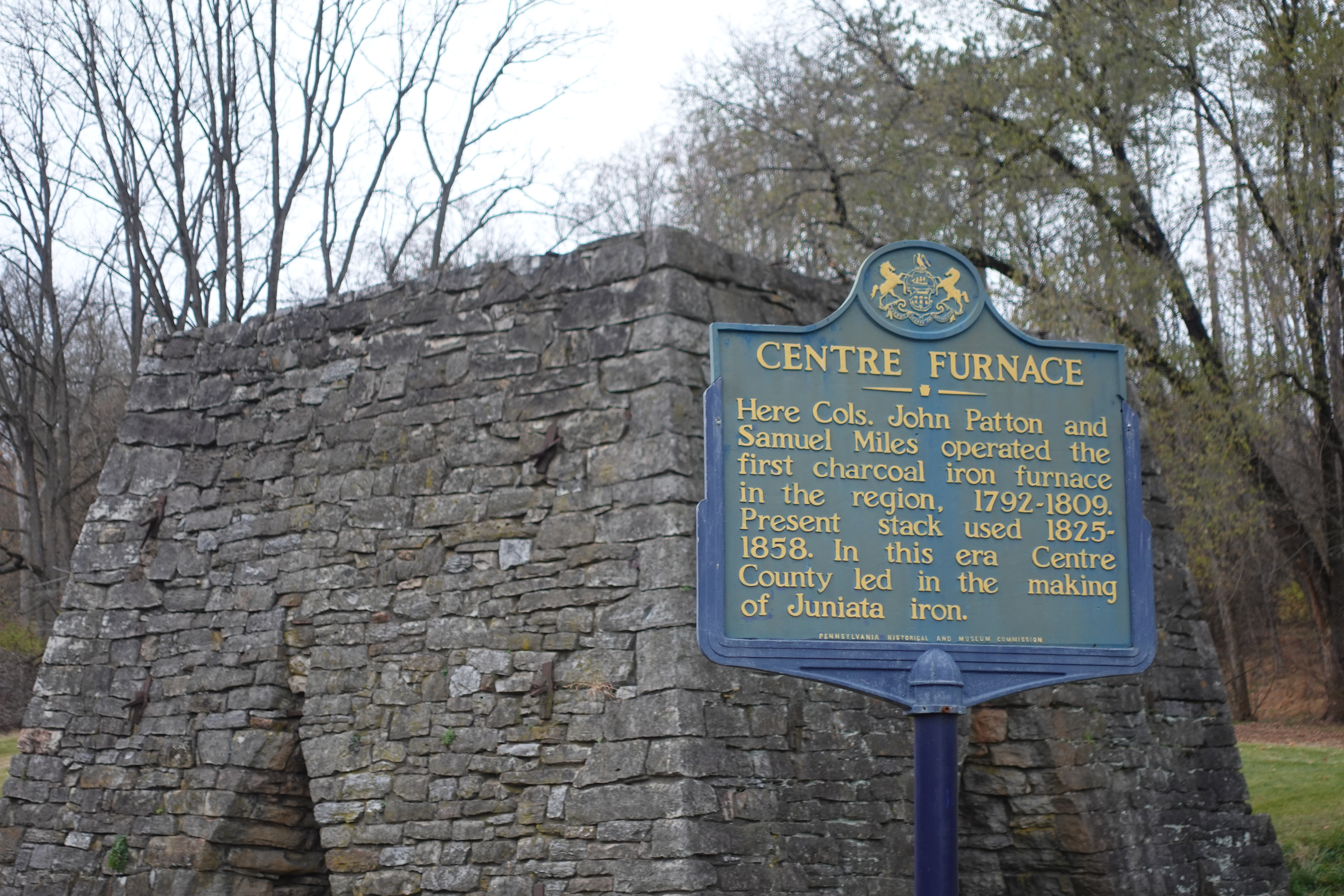
Centre Furnace Historical Marker

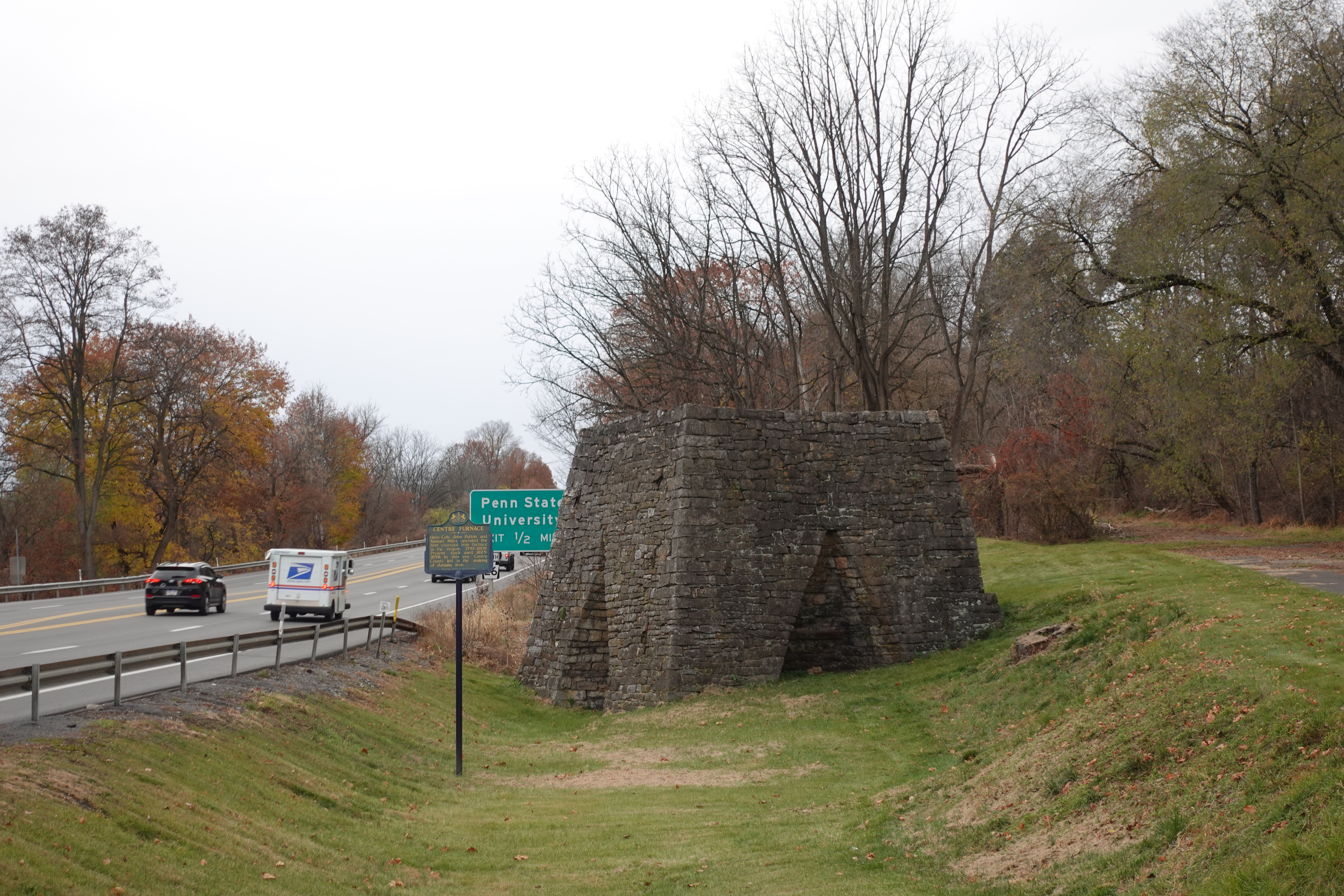
Centre Furnace along East College Avenue
