= Oak Hall Historic District =

Historic district in Pennsylvania, United States

- U.S. National Register of Historic Places
- U.S. Historic district
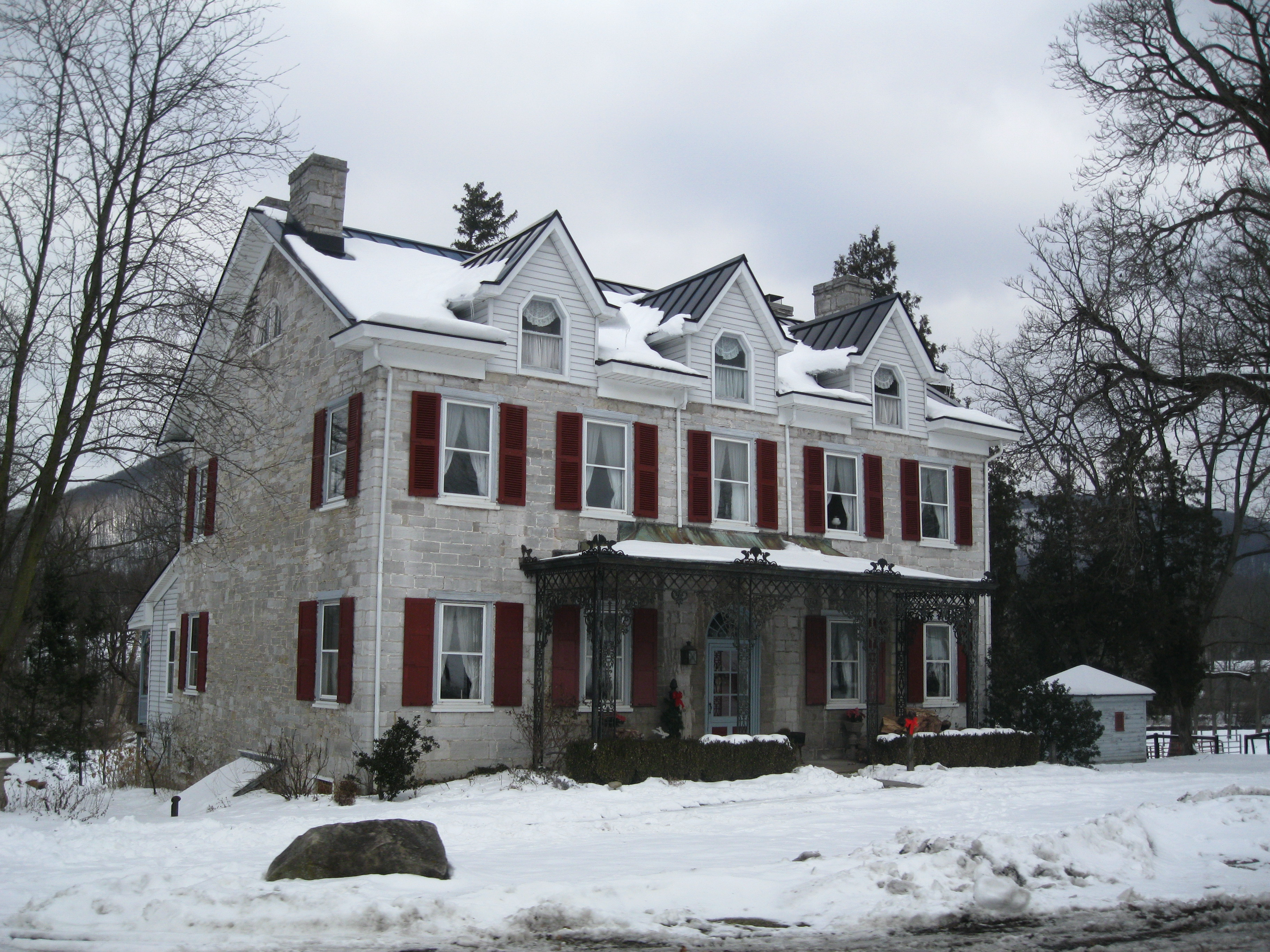
- The Irvin Mansion in the district in 2013

- Location within Pennsylvania Location within the United States
- Location: SR 871, Oak Hall, College Township, Pennsylvania
- Coordinates: 40°47′37″N 77°48′18″W
- Area: 35 acres (14 ha)
- Built: c. 1825
- Built by: Irvin, John, Sr.
- Architectural style: Late Victorian, Georgian
- NRHP reference No.: 79002185
- Added to NRHP: October 25, 1979

The Oak Hall Historic District is a national historic district that is located in Oak Hall, College Township, Centre County, Pennsylvania.

It was added to the National Register of Historic Places in 1979.

== History and architectural features ==
This district includes seventeen contributing buildings and three contributing structures that are located in Oak Hall. The district includes the mansion house that was once owned by General James Irvin, the Irvin stone barn (c. 1825), and a grist mill site. The Irvin Mansion was built circa 1825, and is a 2 1/2-story, five-bay, limestone house with a center hall plan and gable roof. It features a mix of Georgian and Late Victorian style details.

Associated with the mansion are a small shed, a wagon shed/ice house, a smokehouse, and an privy. The remains of the grist mill were rebuilt as a residence in 1961.

Also located in the district are the Johnstonbaugh House (c. 1825), Benjamin Peters House (c. 1860), and Garman House (1866).
