= Panorama, Pennsylvania =

Unincorporated community in Pennsylvania, US

Panorama Village, Pennsylvania
- Unincorporated community
- Location within the U.S. state of Pennsylvania Panorama (the United States)
- Coordinates: 40°47′3.22″N 77°48′36″W
- Country: United States
- State: Pennsylvania
- County: Centre
- Township: College and Harris
- Elevation: 1,158 ft (353 m)
- Time zone: UTC-5 (Eastern (EST))
  - Summer (DST): UTC-4 (EDT)
- ZIP code: 16801
- GNIS feature ID: 1183239

Panorama is a neighborhood and an unincorporated community split between Harris and College Township, Centre County, Pennsylvania, United States. It is part of Happy Valley and the larger Nittany Valley. Panorama is south of Oak Hall, northwest of Boalsburg, and east of Southridge.

== History ==
The Panorama Village Elementary School was built in 1959. In 1995 Mount Nittany Middle School was built in the village. After Mount Nittany Elementary School opened in the fall 2011, the Panorama Village building has been vacant.
