= Samuel Miles =

American military officer and politician

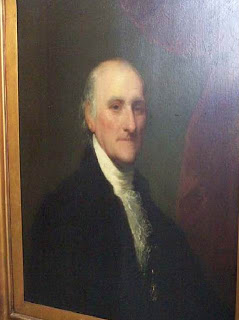
- Portrait by Gilbert Stuart, c. 1800

46th Mayor of Philadelphia
- In office 1790–1791
- Preceded by: Samuel Powel
- Succeeded by: John Barclay

Personal details
- Born: March 11, 1739 Montgomery County, Pennsylvania
- Died: December 29, 1805 (aged 66) Whitemarsh Township, Pennsylvania
- Spouse: Catherine Wister (m. 1761)
- Children: Hannah (1764–1845), Samuel (1767–1767), Abigail (1768–1823), James (1770–1797), Catherine (1771–1771), Sarah (1772–1775), Mary (1775–1835), John W. (1778–1829), Joseph (1780–1841), and Charles (1783–1814)
- Parent(s): James Miles (1705–1784) and Hannah Pugh (1715–1749)

Military service
- Rank: Brigadier General
- Unit: Pennsylvania State Rifle Regiment
- Battles/wars: American Revolution; Battle of Long Island

Samuel Miles (March 11, 1739 – December 29, 1805) was an American military officer and politician, as well as a wealthy and influential businessman, active in Pennsylvania before, during, and after the American Revolutionary War.

== Military career ==
Born in Whitemarsh in what now is Montgomery County, Pennsylvania, Miles was one of seven children of James Miles (1705–1784) and Hannah Pugh (1715–1749).

He enlisted in the military in Bethlehem, Pennsylvania, at the age of 16 (serving from October 1755 through February 1756) in Isaac Wayne's company that was part of the Pennsylvania militia during the French and Indian War. The company had been formed with the intent for "Col. Dr.” Benjamin Franklin to command. However, Franklin decided against filling that role and was succeeded by Col. William Clapham who participated in the construction of several forts in Pennsylvania during the war.

Miles became a lieutenant at age 19 and was put in charge of the small garrison in Shippensburg, a settlement that straddled Cumberland and Franklin counties. He was named a captain shortly before he turned 20. He was wounded in the Battle of Fort Ligonier in today's Westmoreland County. Shortly afterward, he was appointed commander of the garrison there. He was discharged, but then re-enlisted in Thomas Lloyd's company as a sergeant and was promoted to captain-lieutenant for the expedition to Fort Duquesne. He accepted a commission as captain in 1760 and commanded troops on Presque Isle (now Erie, Pennsylvania).

After the war, Miles went into business as a wine merchant and, on February 16, 1761, married Catherine Wister (1742–1797), the Rev.John Gano officiating. daughter of John Wister of Grumblethorpe, Philadelphia.

Miles was an early advocate for American independence from England and quickly entered politics and was elected to Pennsylvania's House of Assembly in 1772.

In the early days of the American Revolution, Miles raised a militia company. When the war began in earnest, he was made colonel of the Pennsylvania State Rifle Regiment, a state unit later adopted into the Continental Army. Before the Battle of Long Island on August 27, 1776, he received a letter from General George Washington seeking his assistance.

As a senior member of Washington's command staff, Miles took part in that battle that took place on the western end of Long Island in present-day Brooklyn. When the tide of battle turned against the Americans, Miles commanded a holding action that allowed Washington and the bulk of his outnumbered troops to escape. Miles was willingly captured by the British thinking he was George Washington, but was released as part of a prisoner exchange for captured British Lt. Col. Archibald Campbell in April 1778.

While a prisoner, Miles had been promoted to brigadier general of Pennsylvania troops, although for most of his adult life he used the title "colonel" because he was unable to take the promotion. This was because as part of his release, he had pledged to the British that he would not again take up arms, but that pledge did not disqualify him from command and administrative efforts against them. So, he retained his title of colonel and became quartermaster for the State of Pennsylvania, serving under Timothy Pickering, who himself went on to serve in several high-ranking federal positions in the fledgling United States as well as in both houses of Congress. In the summer of 1781, General Washington counted on General Miles to secure boat transport for the army as it made its way south from New York to Yorktown.

== After the war ==
In 1789, Miles was admitted as an honorary member of the Pennsylvania Society of the Cincinnati.

His post-war life included a distinguished career as a politician and public servant. He was made judge of the Appeals Court, served as an alderman and mayor of Philadelphia from 1790 to 1791. He was reelected as mayor, but declined the office. He was elected trustee for the University of Pennsylvania, resigning in 1793. He also was a member of American Philosophical Society, elected in 1768, and was very active in the First Baptist Church of Philadelphia.

As a businessman, in 1783 he operated an early sugar refinery with Colonel Jacob Morgan at 77 Vine Street in Philadelphia. Joining with financier Robert Morris, he helped underwrite the voyage of the ship Empress of China – the first American vessel to visit mainland China. In 1791, with John Patton, he co-founded Centre Furnace in College Township, Pennsylvania.

Miles also is noted in history as being the nation's first "faithless elector." In the presidential election of 1796, he was a member of the Electoral College pledged to vote for Federalist presidential candidate John Adams. Instead, he cast his vote for Democratic-Republican candidate Thomas Jefferson. This was the first contested presidential election and an angry voter wrote to The Gazette of the United States, "What! Do I chuse Samuel Miles to determine for me whether John Adams or Thomas Jefferson shall be President? No! I chuse him to act, not to think!"

== Ironworks ==
Miles started the ironworks at Centre Furnace in State College in 1791 as a joint venture with James Dunlap and John Patton. He also built the ironworks at Harmony Forge.

== Founding of Milesburg ==
Miles purchased land in Pennsylvania in 1792. The following year his brother, Richard, drew plans for a new town to be called Milesborough. The township was established as part of Mifflin County in 1797. The name was subsequently changed twice. In 1827 it was renames Milesburgh and in 1893 it became Milesburg.

== Family ==
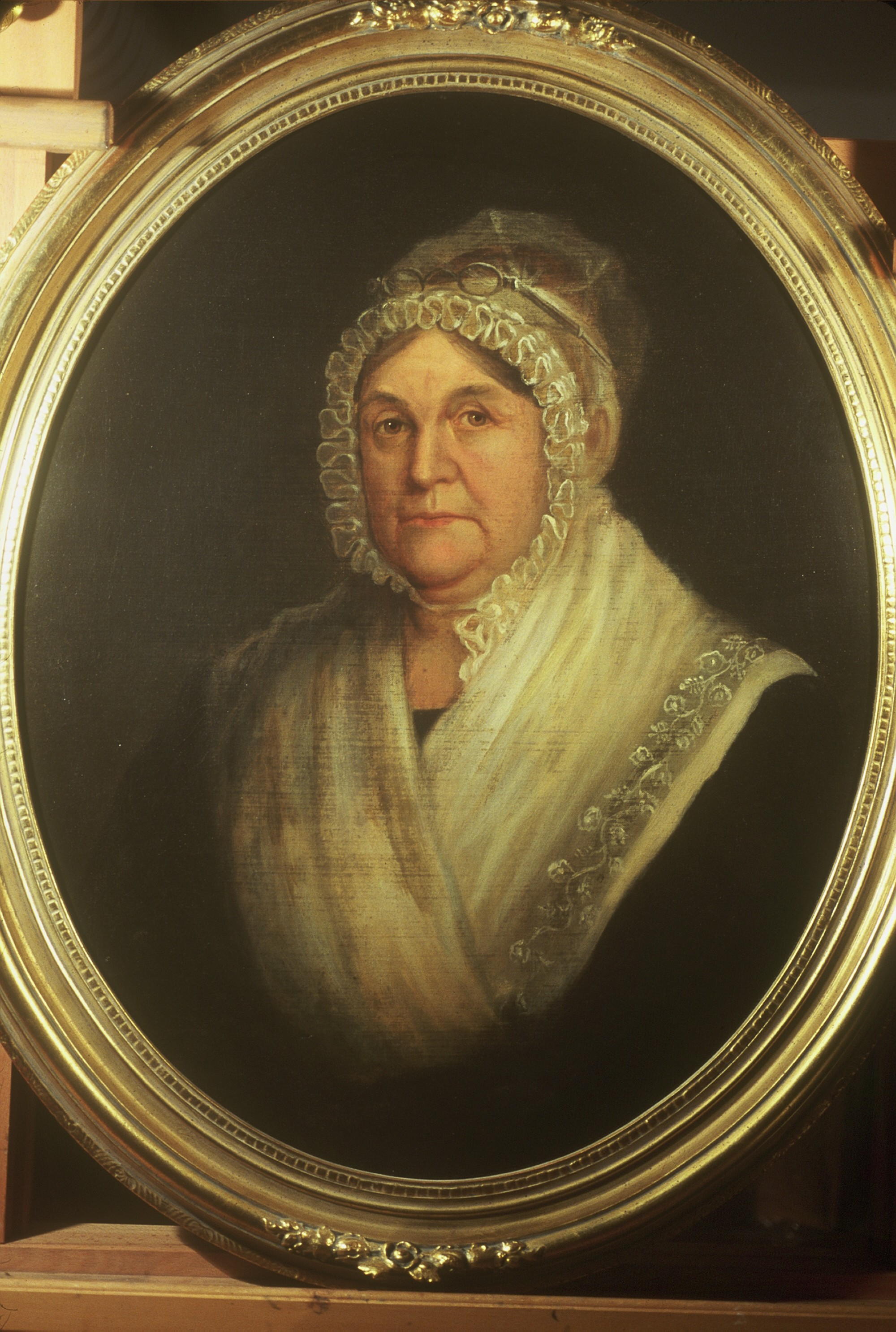
Catherine Wister Miles, portrait believed to be by Gilbert Stuart.

On February 16, 1761, in the First Church of Philadelphia, Miles married Catherine Wister (1742–1797), who was born in Philadelphia to John Caspar Wister and Catharine Rubenkam. They became the parents of 10 children, three of whom died in childhood: Hannah (1764–1845), Samuel (1767–1767), Abigail (1768–1823), James (1770–1797), Catherine (1771–1771), Sarah (1772–1775), Mary (1775–1835), John W. (1778–1829), Joseph (1780–1841), and Charles (1783–1814).

== Later years ==
As a new member of the Democratic-Republican Party, Miles ran three times for Congress. In 1794, he ran in Pennsylvania's 2nd congressional district, losing to Frederick Muhlenberg. In 1798, he ran in both the regular election and an October special election for the 1st congressional district, and lost in both races to political newcomer Robert Waln.

Miles's portrait, painted by the noted American artist Gilbert Stuart, hangs in the National Gallery of Art in Washington, DC. The portrait of his wife, Catherine Wister Miles, that may possibly have been completed by Gilbert Stuart now hangs at Grumblethorpe, the home of her father, John Wister, in the Germantown, Philadelphia, historic district. Another portrait of Samuel Miles, completed by Charles Willson Peale, hangs in the Philadelphia Museum of Art.

Miles died at the age of 66 on December 29, 1805, in Whitemarsh Township, Pennsylvania, and was interred at Mount Moriah Cemetery in Philadelphia.

Political offices
Preceded by Benjamin Franklin	Member, Supreme Executive Council of Pennsylvania, representing the City of Philadelphia; October 20, 1788 – December 20, 1790	Succeeded by position dissolved
Preceded by Samuel Powel	Mayor of Philadelphia; 1790–1791	Succeeded by John Barclay
