= John Patton (colonel) =

John Patton (Colonel) was born 1745 in Sligo, Ireland. He immigrated to Philadelphia about 1765. John Patton married Jane Davis on March 7, 1777 and they had 11 children: Rachael, Benjamin, William, John, Francis, Joseph, Edward, Anna, Jane, Samuel and Ellen. John Patton died 1804 in Centre County, Pennsylvania.

Patton was a major in Samuel Miles' Pennsylvania State Rifle Regiment and distinguished himself in command of the unit's 2nd Battalion during the New York Campaign. George Washington authorized him to raise Patton's Additional Continental Regiment. John Parke and Peter Scull became the field officers while Patton was promoted to colonel. Seven companies were recruited from Pennsylvania, New Jersey, and Delaware. From May 1777, the regiment fought as part of the 4th Virginia Brigade in the Philadelphia Campaign. In July 1778 the unit was reassigned to the Highlands Department. In January 1779, Patton's Regiment was merged with other units to become the "new" 11th Pennsylvania Regiment. However, Captain Allen McLane's Delaware company was reassigned to the 1st Delaware Regiment.

Captains John Lesher, Michael Furrer, George Miller and Michael Wolfe all served under Patton's command.

After the war he partnered with Colonel Samuel Miles and was a co-founder of the Centre Furnace. In 1794 Patton Township, Centre County, Pennsylvania was formed and named for John Patton.

John Patton was originally buried near Shingletown, Pennsylvania. In 1938 his body was moved to Riverview Cemetery in Huntington County, Pennsylvania.
