= John I. Thompson Grain Elevator and Coal Sheds =

- Pennsylvania state historical marker
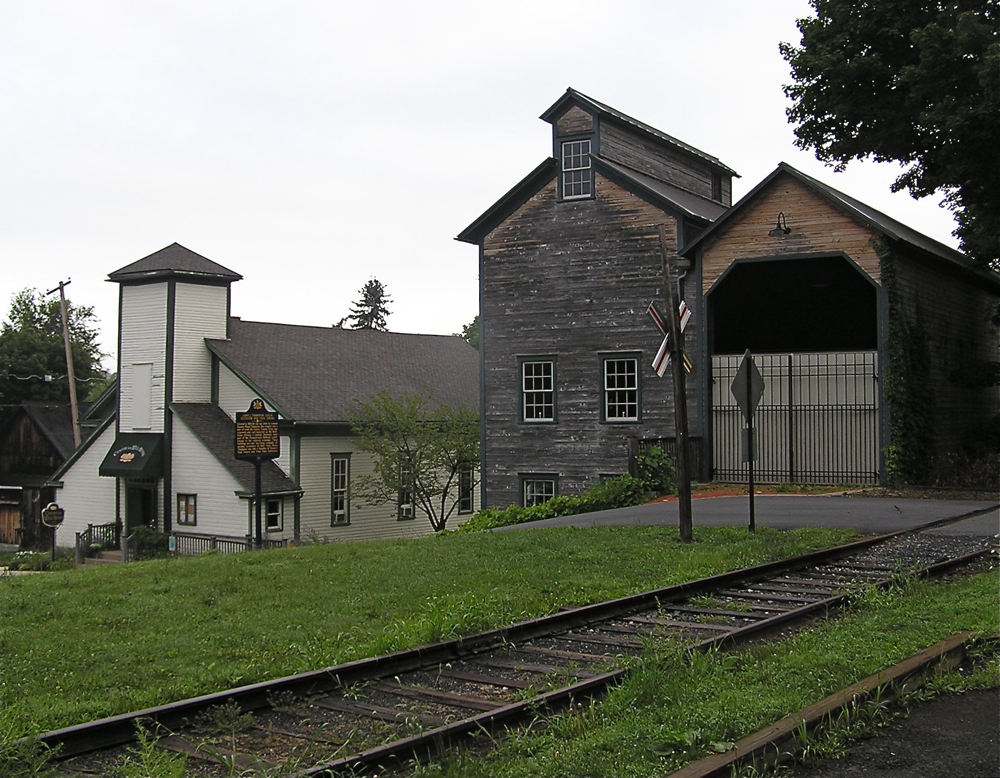
- John I. Thompson Grain Elevator and Coal Sheds in Lemont

- Location within Pennsylvania Location within the United States
- Location: 137 Mt. Nittany Rd., Lemont, Pennsylvania
- Coordinates: 40.8103°N 77.81733°W
- Built: 1885
- Designated PHMC: Jul 21, 2006

The John I. Thompson Grain Elevator and Coal Sheds was built in 1885 after the Lewisburg & Tyrone Railroad was connected to Bellefonte via Lemont. Coal was imported to the station, while grain was exported.

The grain elevator remains one of the oldest in country. The site was purchased by the Lemont Village Association in 90s and renovated by a group of more than 25 volunteers. Since then it has been used to host concerts and festivals and other activities for the village of Lemont.
