= Lemont Historic District =

Historic district in Pennsylvania, United States

- U.S. National Register of Historic Places
- U.S. Historic district
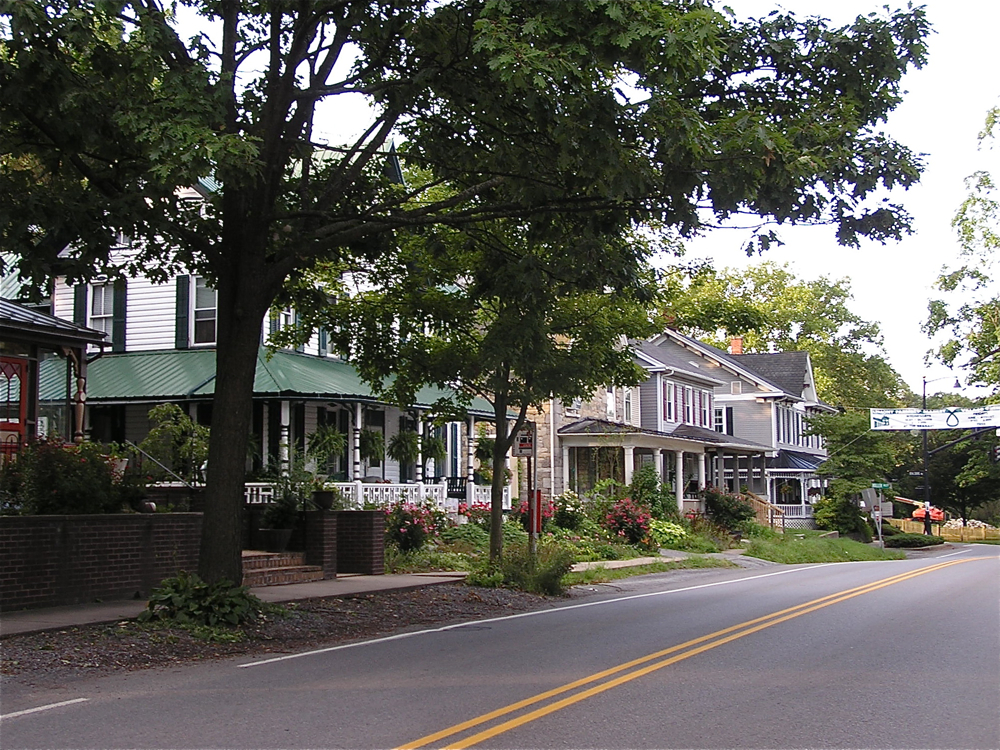
- Pike Street in the Lemont Historic District

- Location within Pennsylvania Location within the United States
- Location: Off PA 26, College Township, Pennsylvania
- Coordinates: 40°48′37″N 77°49′8″W
- Area: 41.7 acres (16.9 ha)
- Built: 1870
- Architectural style: Late 19th And 20th Century Revivals, Late Victorian, Georgian
- NRHP reference No.: 79002182
- Added to NRHP: June 6, 1979

The Lemont Historic District is a national historic district that is located in Lemont, College Township, Centre County, Pennsylvania, United States.

It was added to the National Register of Historic Places in 1979.

== History and architectural features ==
This historic district includes 103 contributing buildings that are located in Lemont. The district is almost exclusively residential with a few community buildings. Notable dwellings include the William Williams House (1840s), Dr. Benjamin Berry House (1835), J.J. Hahn House and Store (1850s), the Lemont Schoolhouse (1870s), John I. Thompson House (1880s), and Dr. J.Y. Dale House (1871). Notable non-residential buildings include the Thompson and Company Bank Building (1868), Spring Creek Presbyterian Church, and the former Lemont Methodist Church.
