= State university (disambiguation) =

A state university, in the United States, is an institution in a state university system.

State university may also refer to:

- Public university, a university that is owned or significantly funded by a government
- State university (India), state-funded public universities in India
- State University (Louisville), now Simmons College of Kentucky, a historically Black college in Louisville, Kentucky, US
- State university (Philippines), public universities in the Philippines
- State university (Russia), public universities in Russia
- Several universities in Ukraine, see List of universities in Ukraine
- State University of Bangladesh
- Belarusian State University
- Baku State University
- State University (Tbilisi Metro), a railway station in Tbilisi, Georgia

== See also ==
- National Universities
- State College (disambiguation)
