= Saxe v. State College Area School District =

- Court: United States Court of Appeals for the Third Circuit
- Full case name: David Warren Saxe; Student Doe 1, by and through his next friend, David Warren Saxe; Student Doe 2, by and through his next friend, David Warren Saxe, Appellants v. State College Area School District; Constance Martin, in her official capacity as President of the State College Area School District
- Argued: May 23, 2000
- Decided: February 14, 2001
- Citation: 240 F.3d 200

Court membership
- Judges sitting: Samuel Alito, Marjorie O. Rendell, John Malcolm Duhé, Jr. (5th Cir.)

Case opinions
- Majority: Alito, joined by Duhé
- Concurrence: Rendell

Saxe v. State College Area School District, 240 F.3d 200 (3d Cir. 2001), was a case decided by the U.S. Court of Appeals for the Third Circuit that ruled that the State College Area School District's policy restricting "unwelcome" and "offensive" speech on public school grounds violates the First Amendment’s Free Speech Clause.

== Background ==
The guardian for two students challenged a Pennsylvania school district's anti-harassment policy, contending it violated their First Amendment rights. From a free speech perspective, the guardian held that the policy prohibited students and other citizens from voicing opinions that were constitutionally protected.

Fearing that the directors of the State College Area School Board would not listen to their concerns about the Board's proposed anti-harassment policy, a group of local parents approached David Saxe, a Member of the Pennsylvania State Board of Education, to present their objections. The School Board, however, did not respond. Three months later, the School Board scheduled a town meeting to attend to the growing dissent over the proposed policy. Dr. Saxe again attempted to persuade the School Board to revise the policy. He was, however, denied the opportunity when the School Board removed his name from the official speakers list claiming that the list of speakers was too long. In order to limit the number of speakers, the Board held a lottery; Dr. Saxe was not selected as a speaker.

A month later, the School Board passed the policy without the revisions suggested by Dr. Saxe in his initial presentation to the Board or in subsequent media presentations.

The policy provided several examples of harassment, including: "any unwelcome verbal, written or physical conduct which offends, denigrates or belittles an individual" because of "race, religion, color, national origin, gender, sexual orientation, disability, or other personal characteristics." The policy protected all individuals in the school and also applied to comments/action of any individual directed at students or school personnel on or outside of school property. The broad character of the policy attracted the attention of the fundamentalist Christian advocacy organization American Family Association.

Believing they had found an ideal test case to expose unconstitutional attempts to curb student speech, AFA lawyers visited State College to discuss legal options with parents. Aligned to the case's First Amendment concerns, David Saxe agreed to take the lead position with the litigation.

The District Court in Williamsport supported the School Board's policy. Saxe then appealed to the Third Circuit Court of Appeals seated in Philadelphia.

=== Panel ===
- Samuel Alito
- Marjorie O. Rendell
- John Malcolm Duhé, Jr.

== Decision ==
In a 3-0 decision, the panel held that such a broadly-worded policy prohibits too much speech and violates the First Amendment.

The court held that the policy prohibits a substantial amount of speech that is neither vulgar within the meaning of the Fraser standard nor school-sponsored within the meaning of the Hazelwood standard. It prohibits speech that harasses someone based on "clothing, physical appearance, social skills, peer group, intellect, educational program, hobbies, or values."

The policy must be judged under the Tinker "substantial disruption" test. This policy could essentially be applied to any speech that another might find offensive. "This could include much 'core' political and religious speech," the panel wrote. "The policy, then, appears to cover substantially more speech than could be prohibited under Tinker’s substantial disruption test."

This decision is consistent with the holdings of other federal appellate courts faced with similar questions. The Third Circuit went further than other courts, however, in drawing a line between legally-sanctionable "true harassment" and speech that is unpopular and deemed "harassment" by school administrators. Although "non-expressive, physically harassing conduct is entirely outside the gambit of the free speech clause," the Court held, "there is also no question that the free speech clause protects a wide variety of speech that listeners may consider deeply offensive, including statements that impugn another's race or national origin or that denigrate religious beliefs." The Court noted that "where pure expression is involved, anti-discrimination laws steer into the territory of the First Amendment."

The Court stated that harassment laws purporting to prohibit verbal activity "that objectively denies a student equal access to a school's educational resources"—the purpose claimed by proponents of academic speech codes—are unconstitutional when what they actually do is prohibit speech seen as offensive by those who disagree with it. Furthermore, the claim that the government has the power to curtail speech when it is likely to produce "a specific and significant fear of disruption" is not enough to justify the banning of offensive speech under the First Amendment. As the Court ruled: "The Supreme Court has held time and again, both within and outside the school context, that the mere fact that someone might take offense at the content of speech is not sufficient justification for prohibiting it."

=== Alito's opinion ===
"No court or legislature has ever suggested that unwelcome speech directed at another's 'values' may be prohibited under the rubric of anti-discrimination. . . . The plaintiffs in this case challenge the constitutionality of a public school district's 'anti-harassment' policy, arguing that it violates the First Amendment's guarantee of freedom of speech. The District Court, concluding that the policy prohibited no more speech than was already unlawful under federal and state anti-discrimination laws, held that the policy is constitutional and entered judgment for the school district. We reverse."

=== Rendell's opinion ===
"I write separately only to note my strong disagreement with the notion, espoused by the District Court and discussed at length in Part II.B of the majority opinion, that the judicial analysis of permissible restrictions on speech in a given setting should be affected—let alone dictated—by legislative enactments intended to proscribe activity that could be classified as 'harassment.' Our attempt at reasoning through this postulate should demonstrate its futility, given the numerous variables that impact on any determination regarding the limits of permissible speech and the rigorous analysis that we must follow in every First Amendment case—the analysis that our opinion does in fact follow in reaching the result in this case.

"Perhaps the only way, or time, that such legislation could be a guide would be if its provisions were identical to the policy at issue, or if in a case involving an as-applied challenge to a policy, the legislative provisions addressed every aspect of the particular factual setting at issue. Even then, I submit that it would be the reasoning by a court upholding its constitutionality, rather than the legislation itself, that would provide the necessary guidance. I view the use of harassment legislation as an especially inappropriate barometer here because this case is not a harassment case. Rather, it is framed by appellants as a First Amendment speech case. Moreover, it is a school speech case. While reliance on provisions of harassment laws or policies might be an easy way to resolve difficult cases such as this one, therein lies the rub—there are no easy ways in the complex area of First Amendment jurisprudence."
