= Oak Hall, Pennsylvania =

Unincorporated community in Pennsylvania, US

- Unincorporated community
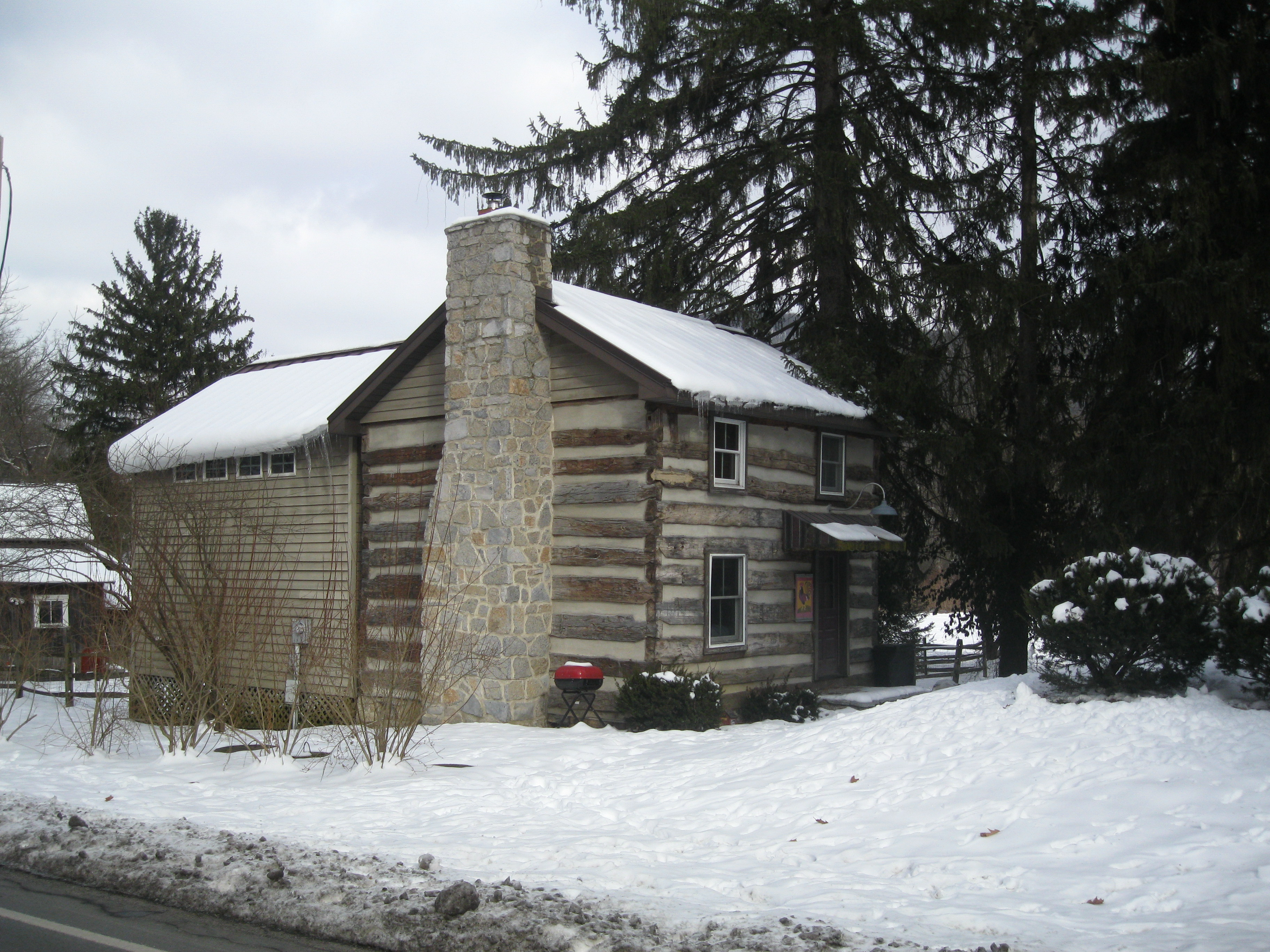
- The Johnstonbaugh House in the Oak Hall Historic District

- Location within the U.S. state of Pennsylvania Oak Hall (the United States)
- Coordinates: 40°47′38.22″N 77°48′9″W
- Country: United States
- State: Pennsylvania
- County: Centre
- Township: College
- Elevation: 1,047 ft (319 m)
- Time zone: UTC-5 (Eastern (EST))
  - Summer (DST): UTC-4 (EDT)
- ZIP code: 16827
- GNIS feature ID: 1182758

Oak Hall is a village and an unincorporated community in College Township, Centre County, Pennsylvania, United States. It is in Happy Valley and the larger Nittany Valley.

== History ==
The Oak Hall Historic District was added to the National Register of Historic Places. During the construction of U.S. Route 322, locally known as the Mount Nittany Expressway, much of the village was demolished.

== Geography ==
Oak Hall is in the foothills of Nittany Mountain halfway between Lemont and Boalsburg. Limestone soil served the agricultural community along Cedar Run. The Oak Hall Quarry, operated by Hanson Aggregates Pennsylvania LLC, is on the north side of the village. Oak Hall Regional Park is a 68-acre park that hosts regional softball tournaments among other activities.

Cedar Run flows into Spring Creek in Oak Hall. These are limestone streams making Oak Hall a popular fly fishing spot, particularly for trout.
