= Tudek Site =

Native American archaeological site (stone quarry) in Pennsylvania

- U.S. National Register of Historic Places
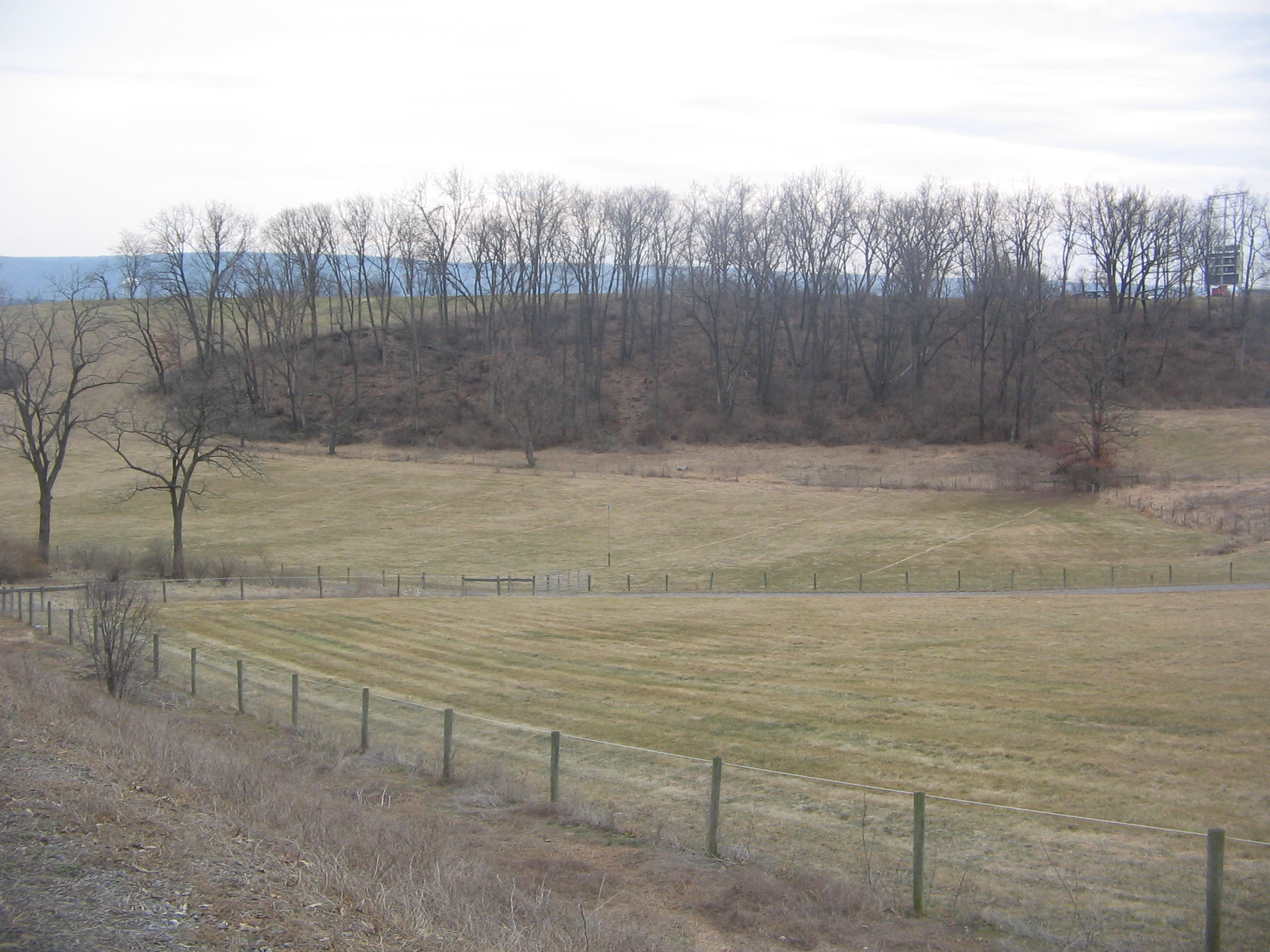

- Location within Pennsylvania Location within the United States
- Location: Along Orchard Rd., northeast of State College College Township, Centre County, Pennsylvania
- Nearest city: State College, Pennsylvania, USA
- Coordinates: 40°49′1″N 77°51′3″W
- Area: 14.8 acres (6.0 ha)
- NRHP reference No.: 82003778
- Added to NRHP: February 12, 1982

The Tudek Site is an archaeological site located near State College in Centre County, Pennsylvania, United States. Used as a stone quarry by prehistoric Native Americans ten thousand years ago, it has been recognized as a prime candidate for prehistoric preservation.

== Location ==
Located in College Township west of the community of Houserville, the site lies in rolling hills along Orchard Road. Before white settlement of the Nittany Valley, areas such as the Tudek Site were typically occupied by hardwood forests, but the site has been cultivated since the nineteenth century. Recent decades have seen increasing development in the Houserville vicinity and a consequent reduction in agriculture.

== Excavation ==
In 1978, an archaeological survey conducted by Pennsylvania State University identified multiple sites along and above Slab Cabin Run, including the Tudek Site; it was named for Bob Tudek, a graduate student who discovered it. Among the sites in the vicinity of the Tudek Site is the Houserville Site, where stone quarried at Tudek was worked. With the pressure of anticipated highway construction through the site, an archaeological investigation at the site began in May 1980; its findings included a wide range of types of jasper of a type known as "Bald Eagle Jasper." Two months later, a more detailed excavation commenced; it revealed a very high concentration of approximately 350 artifacts per cubic meter. Tudek has been dated to the Early and Middle Archaic periods, or approximately 8000 to 3500 BC. While no dateable projectile points and stone tools were found at the site, the Houserville Site has been so dated by the presence of such artifacts, and it is believed that the two sites were used contemporaneously. It is believed that the yellow Bald Eagle Jasper was mined and heated at Tudek before being transported to Houserville, approximately 1.5 kilometres (0.93 mi) to the east.

== Conclusions ==
Post-excavation analysis of Tudek and Houserville has concluded that the sites were typically occupied by transient groups primarily engaged in recovering and processing Bald Eagle Jasper. The Tudek and Houserville sites were clearly used for different purposes: while a wide range of tools and flakes was discovered at Houserville, such objects were noticeably absent from Tudek. The presence of these objects has been understood to indicate that the Archaic peoples who used the quarries would remain at Tudek only long enough to mine their jasper before returning to their campsites at Houserville. Little processing was carried out at Tudek; the objects produced were rough stone blocks, ready for shaping elsewhere.

Pennsylvania State University archaeologists have concluded that the information gathered from the Tudek Site is key to understanding central Pennsylvania's Archaic period. Objects made of Bald Eagle Jasper have been discovered at many locations in the region; consequently, the identification of the source of this type of stone may clarify the nature of the area's trade routes. Moreover, access to these sites may enable archaeologists to understand better the limitations of Bald Eagle Jasper and the reasons for its abandonment by later cultures. Finally, as cultural changes typically accompanied advances in lithic technology in early Native American societies, the evidence provided by the Houserville Site may clarify the development of Early and Middle Archaic society in central Pennsylvania.

In 1982, the Tudek Site was listed on the National Register of Historic Places in recognition of its archaeological value. Four years later, the Houserville Site was accorded a similar status.

== See also ==
- List of Native American archaeological sites on the National Register of Historic Places in Pennsylvania
