= State College–DuBois combined statistical area =

Coordinates: 41°00′N 78°15′W

State College–DuBois, CSA
- Combined statistical area
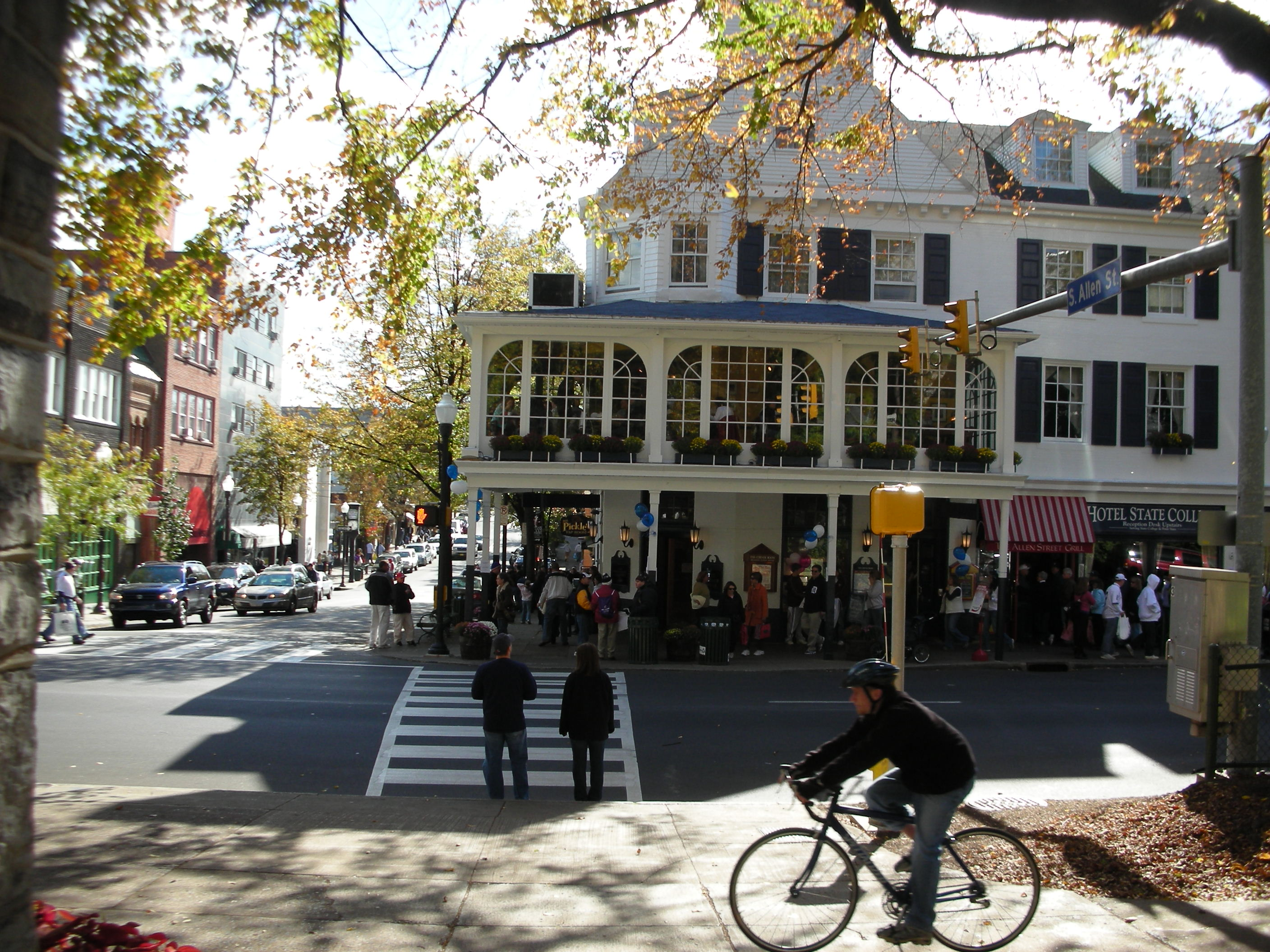
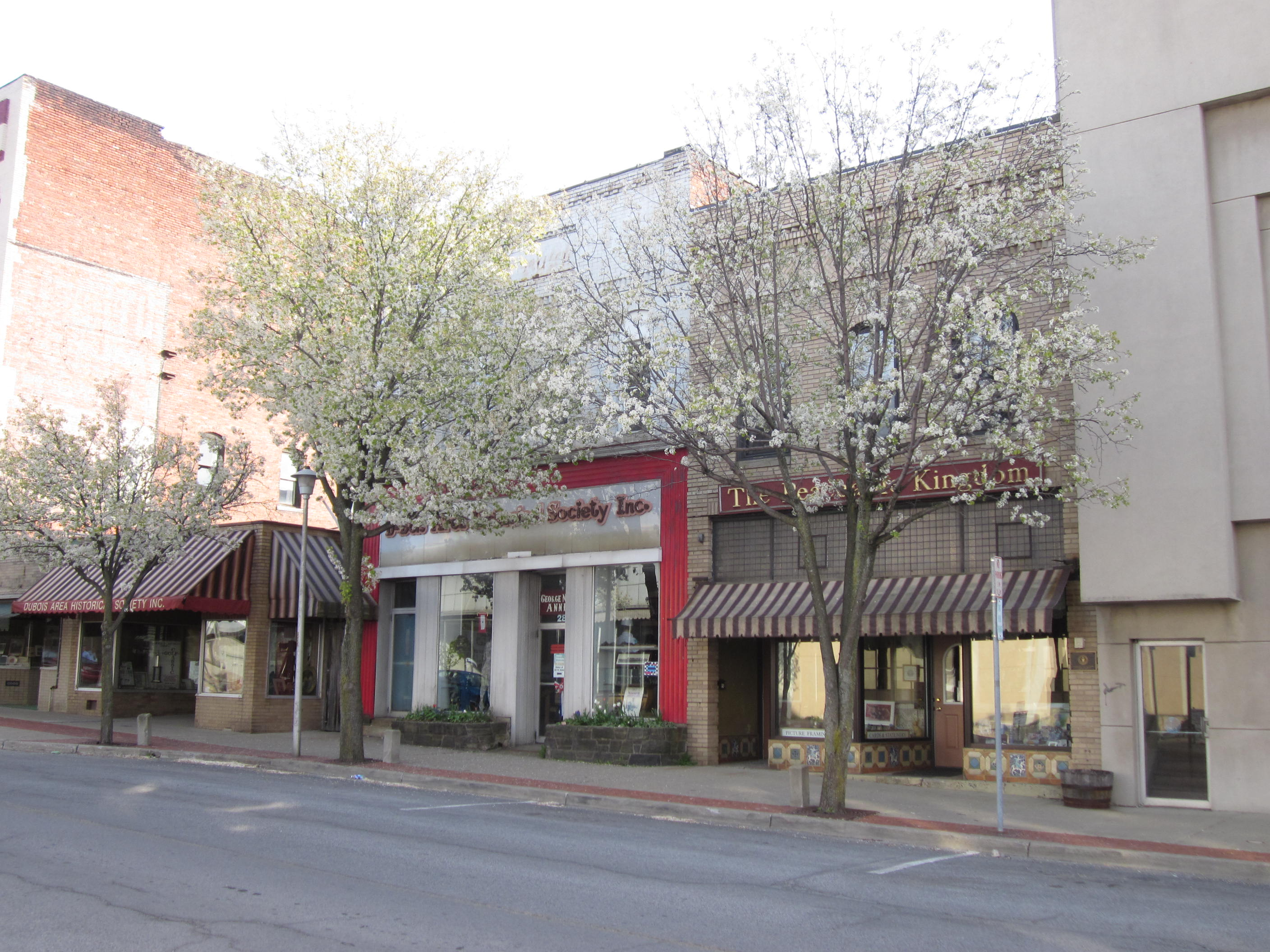
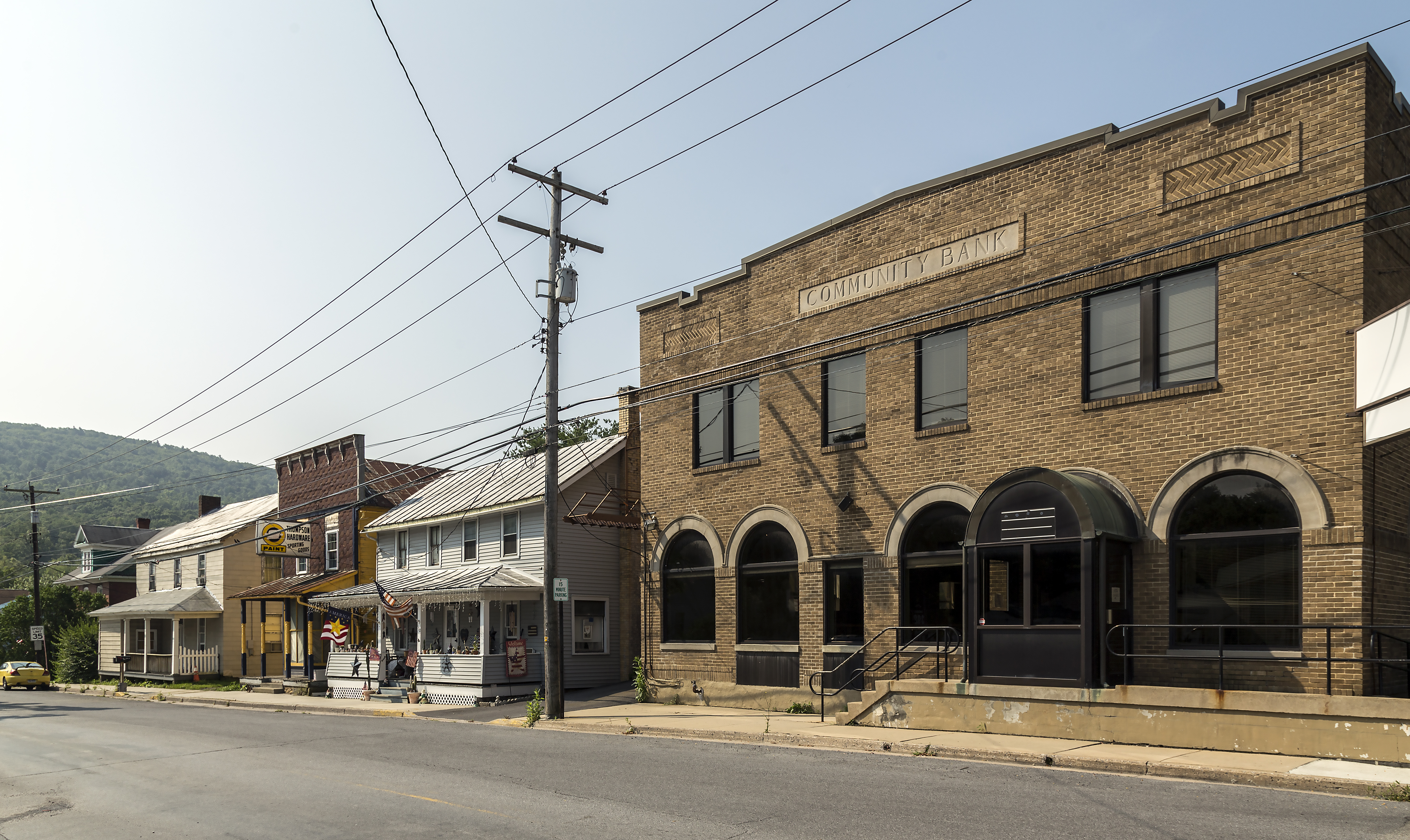
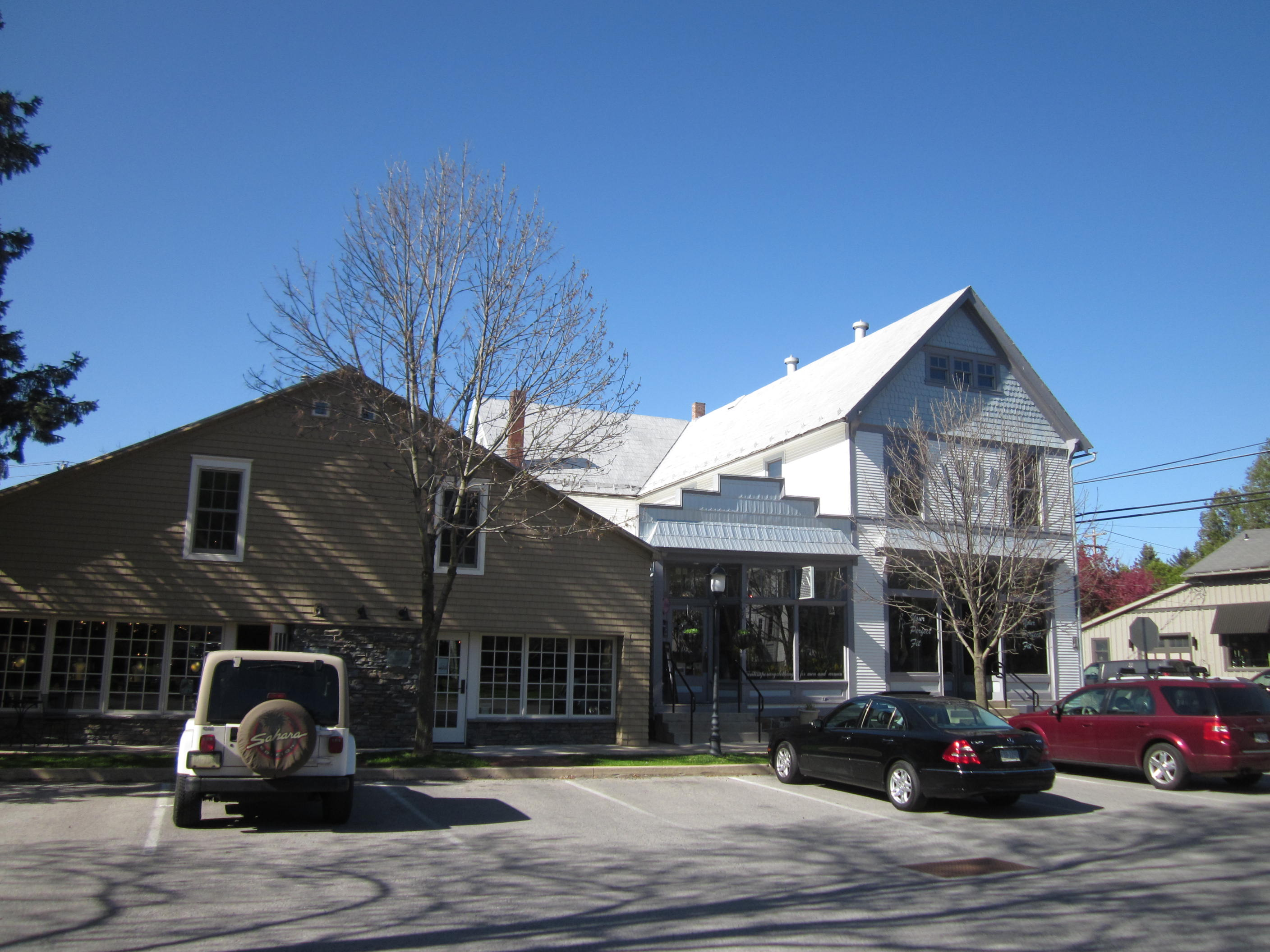
- Clockwise from top left: State College, DuBois, Boalsburg, and Port Matilda
Interactive Map of State College–DuBois
Combined Statistical Area
State College, PA MSA
DuBois, PA µSA
- Country: United States
- State: Pennsylvania
- Principal cities: State College; DuBois; Bellefonte
- Elevation: 1,152 ft (351 m)

Population (2010)
  - Metro: CSA: 236,577 (124th)
- Time zone: UTC-5 (EST)
  - Summer (DST): UTC-4 (EST)

The State College–DuBois, combined statistical area (CSA) is made up of two counties in central Pennsylvania. The United States Office of Management and Budget recognized the State College and DuBois areas along with the counties of Centre and Clearfield as a combined statistical area (CSA) in Central Pennsylvania.

As of the 2010 United States census, the CSA had a population total of 235,632, ranking the ninth most populous in Pennsylvania and 123rd most populous in the United States.

== Component metropolitan areas ==
=== State College, PA Metropolitan Statistical Area ===
- Centre County population 155,171

==== Boroughs ====
- Bellefonte (county seat)
- Centre Hall
- Howard
- Milesburg
- Millheim
- Philipsburg
- Port Matilda
- Snow Shoe
- Unionville

=== DuBois, PA Micropolitan Statistical Area ===
- Clearfield County population 81,642

==== Cities/major boroughs ====
- Clearfield
- Curwensville
- DuBois
- Treasure Lake

== See also ==
- Pennsylvania census statistical areas
