= State College Area School District =

School district in Pennsylvania

Coordinates: 40.78418°N 77.90473°W

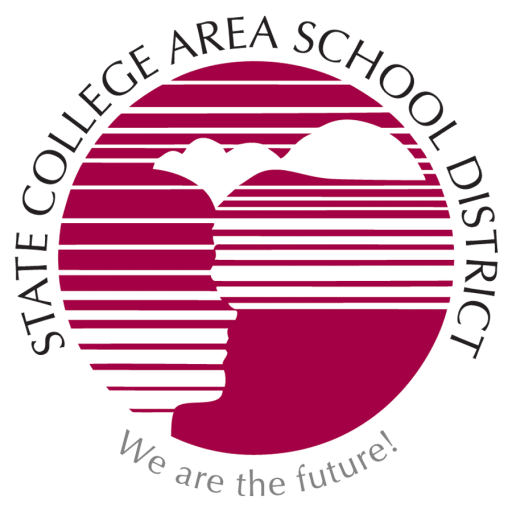

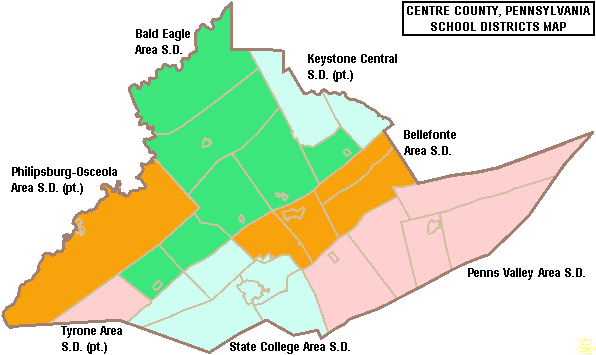

Location
- State College, Pennsylvania United States

District information
- Type: Public
- Motto: "To ensure every student has opportunities to grow, thrive, and fulfill their potential through caring, responsive education."
- Grades: K-12
- Superintendent: Curtis Johnson
- School board: Amy Bader, President

Students and staff
- Students: 6,712
- Teachers: 634 in 2016
- Staff: approximately 1,410
- Athletic conference: Mid-Penn Conference
- District mascot: Little Lion
- Colors: Maroon and Gray

Other information
- Website: State College Area School District

The State College Area School District (SCASD) is a large, suburban and rural public school district based in State College, Pennsylvania.

The district's territory includes the borough of State College, Pennsylvania, and the surrounding townships of College, Ferguson, Halfmoon, Harris, and Patton. It also includes a portion of Benner Township. State College Area School District encompasses approximately 150 square miles (390 km^{2}).

This district operates eight elementary schools, two middle schools, one high school, and one democratic program of choice (middle and high school).

== Board of Directors ==
The State College Area School District Board of Directors consists of nine members who serve four-year terms. The last election was in November 2023, which saw the seating of five members, all of whom were part of the "Slate for State" coalition. The next election will be in November 2025, wherein the positions of Deborah Anderson, Peter Buck, Carline Crevecoeur, and Jackie Huff will be on the ballot.

President: Amy Bader

Vice President: Deborah Anderson

Members:

- Deborah Anderson
- Amy Bader
- Gretchen Brandt
- Peter Buck
- Carline Crevecoeur
- Anne Demo
- Jackie Huff
- Dan Kolbe
- Aaron Miller

== Extracurriculars ==
The district offers an extensive extracurricular program for elementary through high school students, including clubs, activities, and sports. The district's athletics programs are under the Pennsylvania Interscholastic Athletic Association.

=== Sports ===
According to the 2018-2019 SCASD Middle School Student Handbook, the district funds the following:

Boys

- Baseball - AAAA
- Basketball- AAAA
- Cross Country - AAA
- Football - AAAA
- Golf - AAA
- Indoor Track and Field - AAA
- Lacrosse - AAAA
- Soccer - AAA
- Swimming and Diving - AAA
- Tennis - AAA
- Track and Field - AAA
- Volleyball - AAA
- Wrestling - AAA

Girls

- Basketball - AAAA
- Cheer - AAAA
- Cross Country - AAA
- Indoor Track and Field - AAAA
- Field Hockey - AAA
- Golf - AAA
- Lacrosse - AAAA
- Rugby - AAAA
- Soccer (Fall) - AAA
- Softball - AAAA
- Swimming and Diving - AAA
- Girls' Tennis - AAA
- Track and Field - AAA
- Volleyball - AAA

Middle School Sports

Boys

- Basketball
- Football
- Soccer
- Track and Field
- Wrestling

Girls

- Basketball
- Cheer
- Field Hockey
- Soccer
- Softball
- Track and Field
- Volleyball

== See also ==
- Saxe v. State College Area School District
