= College Township, Pennsylvania =

Township in Pennsylvania, US

Coordinates: 40°49′00″N 77°52′34″W

College Township, Centre County, Pennsylvania
- Township
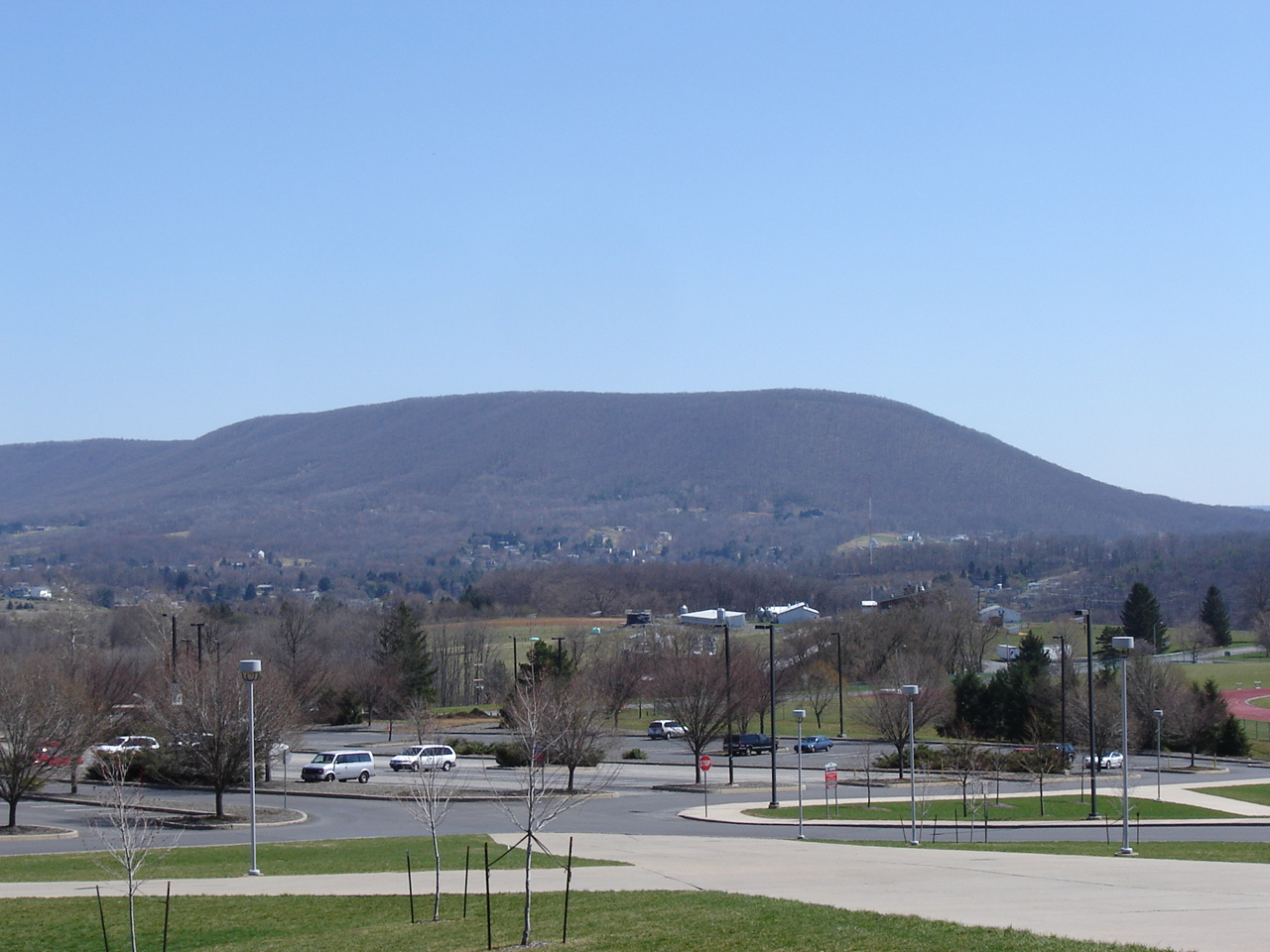
- Mount Nittany and College Township seen from the Bryce Jordan Center at Penn State

- Seal Logo
- Motto: "Gateway to the Centre Region"
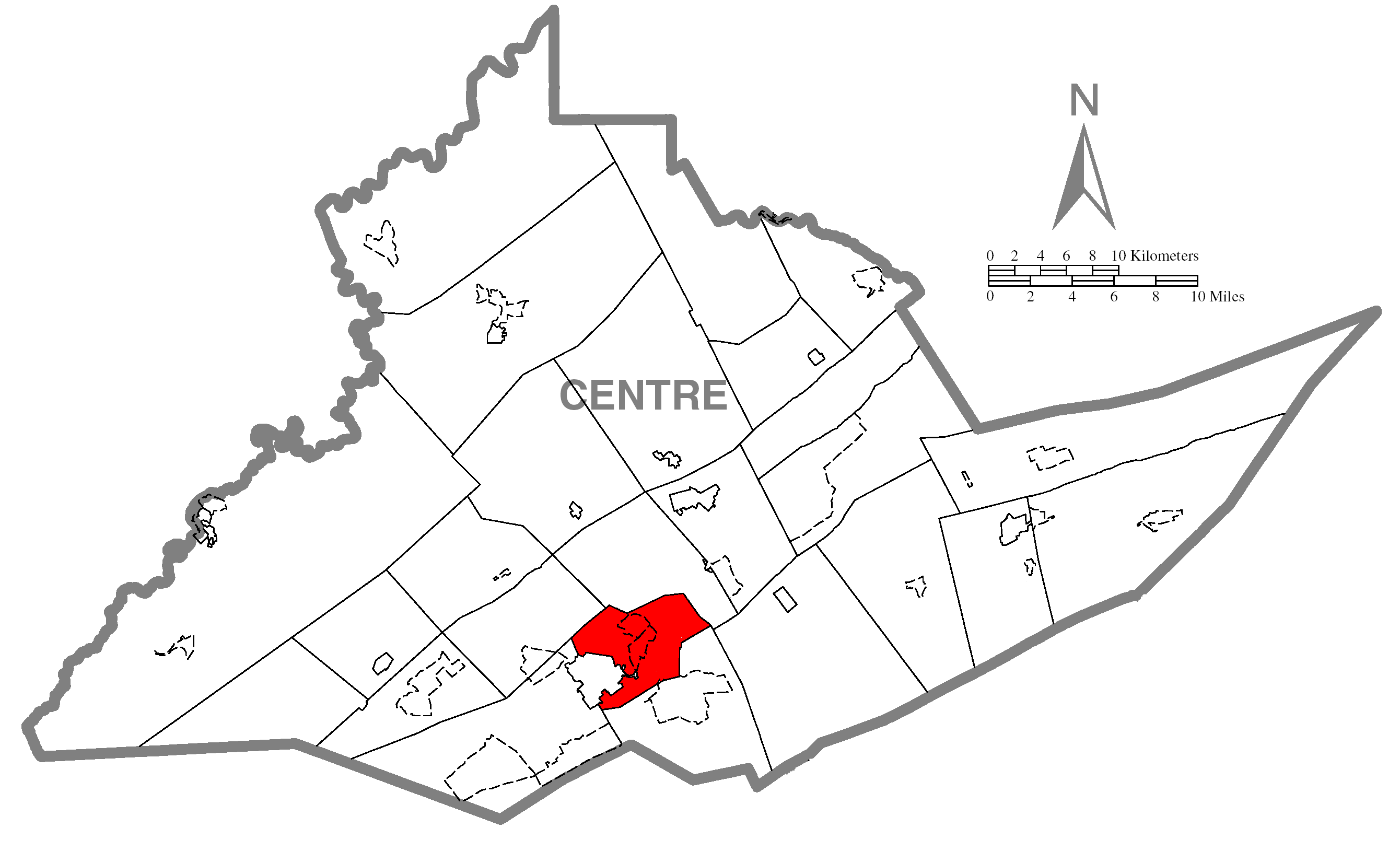
- Location of College Township in Centre County, Pennsylvania

- Location of Centre County in Pennsylvania
- Country: United States
- State: Pennsylvania
- County: Centre
- Settled: 1800
- Incorporated: 1875

Government
  - Type: Township Council
  - Council Chair: L. Eric Bernier
  - Vice-Chair: Susan Trainor
  - Council Member: D. Richard (Rich) Francke
  - Council Member: Tracey Mariner
  - Council Member: Dustin Best

Area
  - Total: 18.55 sq mi (48.05 km^{2})
  - Land: 18.55 sq mi (48.05 km^{2})
  - Water: 0 sq mi (0.00 km^{2})

Population (2020)
  - Total: 10,762
  - Estimate (2021): 10,695
  - Density: 554.6/sq mi (214.15/km^{2})
- Time zone: UTC-5 (EST)
  - Summer (DST): UTC-4 (EDT)
- FIPS code: 42-027-15136
- Website: www.collegetownship.org

College Township is a township in Centre County, Pennsylvania. It is part of the State College, Pennsylvania metropolitan statistical area. The population was 10,762 at the 2020 census, which was a 13% increase from the 2010 census. College Township was formed on November 25, 1875, from Harris Township. A notable feature of the township is Mount Nittany, the southwestern (and iconic) portion of which is located within the township's northeastern section near the village of Lemont.

== History ==
Two major Native American archaeological sites are located in College Township. Known as the Tudek and Houserville sites, they were used during the Archaic period for the quarrying and reduction of stone tools made of jasper. Both sites are listed on the National Register of Historic Places.

=== Historic Districts ===
- Lemont Historic District
- Oak Hall Historic District

== Geography ==
According to the U.S. Census Bureau, the township has a total area of 18.6 square miles (48.1 km^{2}), all land. Mount Nittany is a prominent and well-known feature in the township.

College Township is bordered by Ferguson Township to the west, Patton Township to the northwest, Benner Township to the north, Harris Township to the south, and east, and the borough of State College to the south and west.

=== Neighborhoods ===
- Boalsburg (census-designated place)
- Houserville (census-designated place)
- Lemont (census-designated place)
- Millbrook
- Oak Hall
- Panorama

== Demographics ==
Historical population
Census	Pop.	Note	%±
2000	8,489		—
2010	9,521		12.2%
2020	10,762		13.0%
2021 (est.)	10,695		−0.6%

As of a 2015 census estimate, the township was 89.9% Non-Hispanic White, 4.3% Black or African American, 1.2% Native American Alaska Native, 4.8% Asian, 0.3% Some other race, and 2.1% were Two or More Races. Hispanics and Latinos (of any race) were 1.1% of the population.

== Government ==
College Township is part of Pennsylvania's 15th congressional district, represented by Republican Glenn Thompson, elected in 2008.

College Township contracts police service from the State College Police Department, while Penn State University Police provides coverage to University Park campus.

College Township is served by the Alpha Fire Company for fire protection, which maintains one of its two substations in the College Township Municipal Building. Centre Lifelink EMS is based in College Township, as is Mount Nittany Medical Center which also provides emergency medical services.

A portion of State Correctional Institution – Rockview, a prison of the Pennsylvania Department of Corrections, is in College Township.

== Education ==
College Township is served by the State College Area School District for K-12 education.

Pennsylvania State University is partially in College Township.

== Transportation ==
The Centre Area Transportation Authority provides local bus service with fixed routes between College Township and the borough of State College as well as Patton, and Ferguson Township.

=== Roads ===
Highways include:

- U.S. Route 322 Business
- U.S. Route 322
- Interstate 99
- Pennsylvania Route 26
- Pennsylvania Route 150
