= List of places in Pennsylvania: T =

This list of cities, towns, unincorporated communities, counties, and other recognized places in the U.S. state of Pennsylvania also includes information on the number and names of counties in which the place lies, and its lower and upper zip code bounds, if applicable.

Name of place	Number of counties	Principal county	Lower zip code	Upper zip code
Table Rock	1	Adams County	17307	
Tabor	1	Philadelphia County		
Tacony	1	Philadelphia County	19135	
Tadmor	1	Northampton County		
Tafton	1	Pike County	18464	
Taintor	1	McKean County		
Tait	1	Jefferson County		
Takitezy	1	Venango County		
Talcose	1	Chester County		
Talley Cavey	1	Allegheny County	15101	
Tallmanville	1	Wayne County		
Tallyho	1	McKean County		
Talmage	1	Lancaster County	17580	
Talmer	1	Columbia County	17814	
Tamanend	1	Schuylkill County	18252	
Tamaqua	1	Schuylkill County	18252	
Tamarack	1	Clinton County	17729	
Tambine	1	Elk County		
Tamiment	1	Pike County	18371	
Tanguy	1	Delaware County		
Tank	1	Luzerne County	18249	
Tanners Falls	1	Wayne County		
Tannersville	1	Monroe County	18372	
Tannertown	1	Union County	17844	
Tannery	1	Carbon County	18661	
Tannery	1	Luzerne County	18661	
Tanoma	1	Indiana County	15728	
Tarentum	1	Allegheny County	15084	
Tarrs	1	Westmoreland County	15679	15688
Tarrtown	1	Armstrong County	16210	
Tartown	1	Adams County		
Tatamy	1	Northampton County	18085	
Tatesville	1	Bedford County	15537	
Taxville	1	York County		
Taylor	1	Lackawanna County	18517	
Taylor Highlands	1	Huntingdon County	16652	
Taylor-Old Forge	1	Lackawanna County	18517	
Taylor Township	1	Blair County		
Taylor Township	1	Centre County		
Taylor Township	1	Fulton County		
Taylor Township	1	Lawrence County		
Tayloria	1	Lancaster County	19363	
Taylorstown	1	Washington County	15323	15365
Taylorsville	1	Bucks County	18940	
Taylorsville	1	Indiana County		
Taylortown	1	Greene County		
Taylorville	1	Indiana County	15729	
Taylorville	1	Schuylkill County	17921	
Teagarden Homes	1	Greene County	15322	
Tearing Run	1	Indiana County	15748	
Teedyskung Lake	1	Pike County	18457	
Teepleville	1	Crawford County	16403	
Telford	2	Bucks County	18969	
Telford	2	Montgomery County	18969	
Tell Township	1	Huntingdon County		
Temple	1	Berks County	19560	
Temple University	1	Philadelphia County		
Templeton	1	Armstrong County	16259	
Tenmile Bottom	1	Venango County	16346	
Terre Hill	1	Lancaster County	17581	
Terry Township	1	Bradford County		
Texas Township	1	Wayne County		
Thaddeus Kosciuszko National Memorial	1	Philadelphia County	19106	
Tharptown	1	Northumberland County	17872	
The Pines	1	Adams County	17350	
Thielman Crossroads	1	Butler County		
Thomas	1	Washington County	15330	
Thomas Crossroads	1	Westmoreland County		
Thomas Mills	1	Cambria County		
Thomas Mills	1	Somerset County	15935	
Thomasdale	1	Somerset County		
Thomasville	1	York County	17364	
Thompson	1	Susquehanna County	18465	
Thompson Township	1	Fulton County		
Thompson Township	1	Susquehanna County		
Thompsons Mills	1	Crawford County		
Thompsontown	1	Clearfield County	15753	
Thompsontown	1	Juniata County	17094	
Thompsonville	1	Washington County	15317	
Thornburg	1	Allegheny County	15205	
Thornbury Township	1	Chester County		
Thornbury Township	1	Delaware County		
Thorndale	1	Chester County	19372	
Thorndale	1	Sullivan County		
Thorndale Heights	1	Chester County	19335	
Thornhurst	1	Lackawanna County	18424	
Thornhurst Township	1	Lackawanna County		
Thornridge	1	Bucks County		
Thornton	1	Delaware County	19373	
Thornton Junction	1	Erie County		
Thornwood	1	Westmoreland County		
Three Springs	1	Huntingdon County	17264	
Three Springs Run	1	Tioga County	16938	
Three Tuns	1	Montgomery County	19002	
Threemile	1	Elk County	16735	
Throop	1	Lackawanna County	18512	
Thumptown	1	Tioga County	15901	
Tiadaghton	1	Tioga County		
Tidal	1	Armstrong County	16259	
Tide	1	Indiana County		
Tidedale	1	Indiana County	15748	
Tidioute	1	Warren County	16351	
Tiffany	1	Susquehanna County	18801	
Tilden	1	York County		
Tilden Township	1	Berks County		
Tillotson	1	Crawford County	16438	
Timber Hills	1	Lebanon County		
Timberly Heights	1	Butler County	16001	
Timberwyck	1	Delaware County	19063	
Timblin	1	Jefferson County	15778	
Timbuck	1	McKean County	16738	
Time	1	Greene County	15353	
Tingley	1	Susquehanna County		
Tinicum Township	1	Bucks County	18947	
Tinicum Township	1	Delaware County		
Tioga	1	Philadelphia County		
Tioga	1	Tioga County	16946	
Tioga Junction	1	Tioga County	16946	
Tioga Township	1	Tioga County		
Tiona	1	Warren County	16352	
Tionesta	1	Forest County	16353	
Tionesta Township	1	Forest County		
Tippecanoe	1	Fayette County	15480	
Tippery	1	Venango County		
Tipton	1	Blair County	16684	
Tire Hill	1	Somerset County	15959	
Tirzah	1	Susquehanna County		
Titlows Corner	1	Chester County		
Titusville	1	Crawford County	16354	
Tivoli	1	Lycoming County	17737	
Toboyne Township	1	Perry County		
Toby	1	Elk County	15846	
Toby Farms	1	Delaware County		
Toby Mines	1	Elk County		
Toby Township	1	Clarion County		
Tobyhanna	1	Monroe County	18466	
Tobyhanna Army Depot	1	Monroe County	18466	
Tobyhanna Township	1	Monroe County		
Tobyhanna Village	1	Monroe County		
Todd	1	Huntingdon County	16685	
Todd Township	1	Fulton County		
Todd Township	1	Huntingdon County		
Todmorron	1	Delaware County	19086	
Toftrees	1	Centre County	16801	
Toland	1	Cumberland County	17324	
Tolna	1	York County	17349	
Tomb	1	Lycoming County	17740	
Tombs Run	1	Lycoming County		
Tomhicken	1	Luzerne County		
Tompkins	1	Tioga County	16940	
Tompkinsville	1	Lackawanna County	18433	
Tomson	1	Northumberland County		
Tomstown	1	Franklin County	17268	
Tooley Corners	1	Lackawanna County	18444	
Toonerville	1	Venango County		
Top	1	Armstrong County		
Topton	1	Berks County	19562	
Torbert	1	Lycoming County		
Torpedo	1	Warren County	16340	
Torrance	1	Westmoreland County	15779	
Torresdale	1	Philadelphia County	19114	
Torrey	1	Wayne County		
Toughkenamon	1	Chester County	19374	
Towamencin Township	1	Montgomery County		
Towamensing Township	1	Carbon County		
Towamensing Trails	1	Carbon County		
Towanda	1	Bradford County	18848	
Towanda Township	1	Bradford County		
Tower City	1	Schuylkill County	17980	
Towerville	1	Chester County	19320	
Towner	1	Bradford County	18837	
Townville	1	Crawford County	16360	
Trachsville	1	Carbon County		
Tracktowne	1	York County		
Tracy	1	Erie County		
Trade City	1	Indiana County	16256	
Tradesville	1	Bucks County	18914	
Trafford	2	Allegheny County	15085	
Trafford	2	Westmoreland County	15085	
Trailwood	1	Luzerne County	18702	
Trainer	1	Delaware County	19061	
Transfer	1	Mercer County	16154	
Trap Rock	1	Berks County		
Trappe	1	Montgomery County	19426	
Trauger	1	Westmoreland County	15650	
Traymore	1	Bucks County	18974	
Treasure Lake	1	Clearfield County		
Tredyffrin Township	1	Chester County		
Treehaven	1	Allegheny County	15102	
Trees Mills	1	Westmoreland County	15601	
Treichler	1	Northampton County		
Treichlers	1	Northampton County	18086	
Tremont	1	Fayette County		
Tremont	1	Schuylkill County	17981	
Tremont Township	1	Schuylkill County		
Trent	1	Somerset County	15622	
Trenton	1	Schuylkill County	17948	
Tresckow	1	Carbon County	18254	
Tresslarville	1	Wayne County	18436	
Treveskyn	1	Allegheny County	15031	
Trevorton	1	Northumberland County	17881	
Trevose	1	Bucks County	19053	
Trevose Heights	1	Bucks County	19049	
Trewigtown	1	Montgomery County	18915	
Trexler	1	Berks County	19529	
Trexlertown	1	Lehigh County	18087	
Tri Mills	1	Columbia County		
Trimmer Manor	1	York County	17405	
Trindle Spring	1	Cumberland County	17055	
Tripoli	1	Cambria County		
Triumph	1	Greene County		
Triumph Township	1	Warren County		
Trooper	1	Montgomery County	19401	
Trotter	1	Fayette County	15425	
Trotwood	1	Allegheny County	15241	
Trout Run	1	Lycoming County	17771	
Troutman	1	Butler County	16041	
Trouts Corners	1	Mercer County		
Trouts Crossing	1	Westmoreland County	15666	
Troutville	1	Clearfield County	15866	
Trowbridge	1	Tioga County		
Troxelville	1	Snyder County	17882	
Troy	1	Bradford County	16947	
Troy	1	Clearfield County	16866	
Troy Center	1	Crawford County	16437	
Troy Hill	1	Allegheny County		
Troy Hill	1	Armstrong County	16201	
Troy Township	1	Bradford County		
Troy Township	1	Crawford County		
Truce	1	Lancaster County	17566	
Trucksville	1	Luzerne County	18708	
Trucksville Gardens	1	Luzerne County	18708	
Truemans	1	Forest County	16347	
Truesdale Terrace	1	Luzerne County	18706	
Truittsburg	1	Clarion County	16224	
Truman	1	Cameron County	15834	
Trumbauersville	1	Bucks County	18970	
Trunkeyville	1	Forest County	16351	
Truxall	1	Westmoreland County	15613	
Tryonville	1	Crawford County	16404	
Trythall	1	Chester County		
Tuckerton	1	Berks County	19605	
Tullytown	1	Bucks County	19007	
Tulpehocken	1	Berks County		
Tulpehocken	1	Philadelphia County		
Tulpehocken Township	1	Berks County		
Tuna	1	McKean County		
Tunkhannock	1	Wyoming County	18657	
Tunkhannock Township	1	Monroe County		
Tunkhannock Township	1	Wyoming County		
Tunnel	1	Luzerne County		
Tunnelhill	2	Blair County	16641	
Tunnelhill	2	Cambria County	16641	
Tunnelton	1	Indiana County	15681	
Turbett Township	1	Juniata County		
Turbot Township	1	Northumberland County		
Turbotville	1	Northumberland County	17772	
Turkey	1	Clarion County		
Turkey City	1	Clarion County	16058	
Turkey Run	1	Schuylkill County	17976	
Turkeyfoot	1	Franklin County	17201	
Turkeyfoot	1	Washington County	15332	
Turkeytown	1	Westmoreland County	15089	
Turn Villa	1	Monroe County		
Turner	1	Crawford County		
Turner	1	Mercer County		
Turnersville	1	Crawford County	16134	
Turnersville	1	Lackawanna County		
Turnip Hole	1	Clarion County	16373	
Turnpike	1	York County	17361	
Turtle Creek	1	Allegheny County	15145	
Turtlepoint	1	McKean County	16750	
Turtleville	1	Union County		
Tuscarora	1	Juniata County	17082	
Tuscarora	1	Schuylkill County	17982	
Tuscarora Summit	1	Franklin County		
Tuscarora Township	1	Bradford County		
Tuscarora Township	1	Juniata County		
Tuscarora Township	1	Perry County		
Tusculum	2	Cumberland County	17257	
Tusculum	2	Franklin County	17257	
Tusseyville	1	Centre County	16828	
Tweedale	1	Chester County		
Twenty Row	1	Cambria County	15927	
Twickinham Village	1	Montgomery County	19038	
Twilight	1	Washington County	15022	
Twin Bridge Farm	1	Chester County	19380	
Twin Bridges	1	Washington County	15022	
Twin Brooks	1	York County	17405	
Twin Grove Park	1	Lebanon County		
Twin Hollows	1	Centre County		
Twin Lakes	1	Pike County	18458	
Twin Oaks	1	Bucks County	19058	
Twin Oaks	1	Delaware County	19014	
Twin Oaks	1	Venango County		
Twin Oaks Farms	1	Delaware County	19014	
Twin Rocks	1	Cambria County	15960	
Two Lick	1	Indiana County		
Two Taverns	1	Adams County	17325	
Twomile	1	McKean County		
Tyler	1	Clearfield County	15849	
Tyler	1	Susquehanna County		
Tyler Hill	1	Wayne County	18469	
Tyler Run-Queens Gate	1	York County		
Tylerdale	1	Washington County	15301	
Tylerdale Junction	1	Washington County		
Tylersburg	1	Clarion County	16361	
Tylersport	1	Montgomery County	18971	
Tylersville	1	Clinton County	17773	
Tyre	1	Allegheny County	15126	
Tyrone	1	Blair County	16686	
Tyrone Forge	1	Blair County		
Tyrone Township	1	Adams County		
Tyrone Township	1	Blair County		
Tyrone Township	1	Perry County		
Tyrrell	1	Bradford County		
