= Juniata and Southern Railroad =

Overview
- Headquarters: Lock Haven
- Locale: Huntingdon County, Pennsylvania
- Dates of operation: 1913–1917
- Successor: abandoned

Technical
- Track gauge: 4 ft 8 1/2 in (1,435 mm) standard gauge

The Juniata and Southern Railroad was a short-lived iron ore and logging railroad in Central Pennsylvania.

It originated as a private lumbering railroad owned by William Caprio and Anthony Grieco, contractors in Lock Haven. It was built from Marklesburg about five miles towards timberland near Paradise Furnace, following Great Trough Creek, in 1910.

In 1912, Caprio & Grieco reached an agreement with Roy W. Jacobs, then engaged in a dispute with the East Broad Top Railroad over service to the Broad Top Coal and Mineral Company's mines along Rocky Ridge. A charter was obtained for the Juniata and Southern Railroad on May 1, 1913, which took over Caprio & Grieco's logging line. The new railroad was surveyed as far as Jacobs and the coal mine there, 14.9 miles (24.0 km) from Marklesburg, and was projected south towards Hancock, Maryland.

However, the bankruptcy of Jacobs' Broad Top Coal company in 1914 slowed construction, and the railroad did not reach the mines at Jacobs until summer 1915, when a new tipple was built to serve them. It followed Great Trough Creek to the gap between Shirley Knob and Rocky Ridge, running high along the ridge to reach the tipple. Traffic was never heavy on the line, consisting of iron ore, mine props, and a little local freight and lumber. Picnic excursions from Marklesburg to Paradise Furnace were also popular with local residents. Never profitable, it was abandoned in 1917, and the East Broad Top built its own siding to the new tipple. Elevated prices for scrap iron during World War I may have contributed to the decision to abandon it.

The western part of the railroad was submerged by the formation of Raystown Lake, but part of the roadbed was used for Trough Creek Drive and part of the Terrace Mountain Trail in Trough Creek State Park.
