= Queensgate =

Queensgate, Queen's Gate and variants may refer to:

== Locations and structures ==
Canada

- Queensgate, a suburb of Caledon, Ontario
- Queen's Gates, ornate entrance to the Canadian parliament

Gibraltar

- Queen's Gate, Gibraltar, an ancient city gate

New Zealand

- Queensgate Shopping Centre, New Zealand in Lower Hutt, Wellington

United Kingdom

- Queensgate Peterborough, in Peterborough, Cambridgeshire
- Queen's Gate, a street in South Kensington, London
  - Queen's Gate (ward), an electoral ward of Kensington and Chelsea London Borough Council created in 1965
- Queen's Gate School, a girls' school in South Kensington, London
- Queensgate, a housing estate in Stockton-on-Tees, on the site of the former Bowesfield Works
- Queensgate, home ground of Bridlington Town

United States

- Queensgate, Cincinnati, Ohio, neighbourhood
- Queens Gate, Pennsylvania
- Tyler Run-Queens Gate, Pennsylvania, a CDP in York County

== Other ==
- Queen's Gate (gamebook), a Japanese visual combat series
- Queen's Gate (poetry collection), a poetry collection by Pia Tafdrup
