= Terrace Mountain =

Terrace Mountain may refer to:

- Terrace Mountain (New York), a peak in the Catskill Mountains
- Terrace Mountain (Washington), a peak in the Cascade Range
- Terrace Mountain (Wyoming), a peak in Yellowstone National Park

== See also ==
- Terrace Mountain Trail, a hiking trail in Pennsylvania
