= York, Pennsylvania (disambiguation) =

York, Pennsylvania could refer to:

- the city of York, Pennsylvania
  - York, Pennsylvania metropolitan area
- York County, Pennsylvania
- York Haven, Pennsylvania
- York Springs, Pennsylvania

== See also ==
- York Township, Pennsylvania
