= Terrace Mountain Trail =

Hiking trail in Pennsylvania

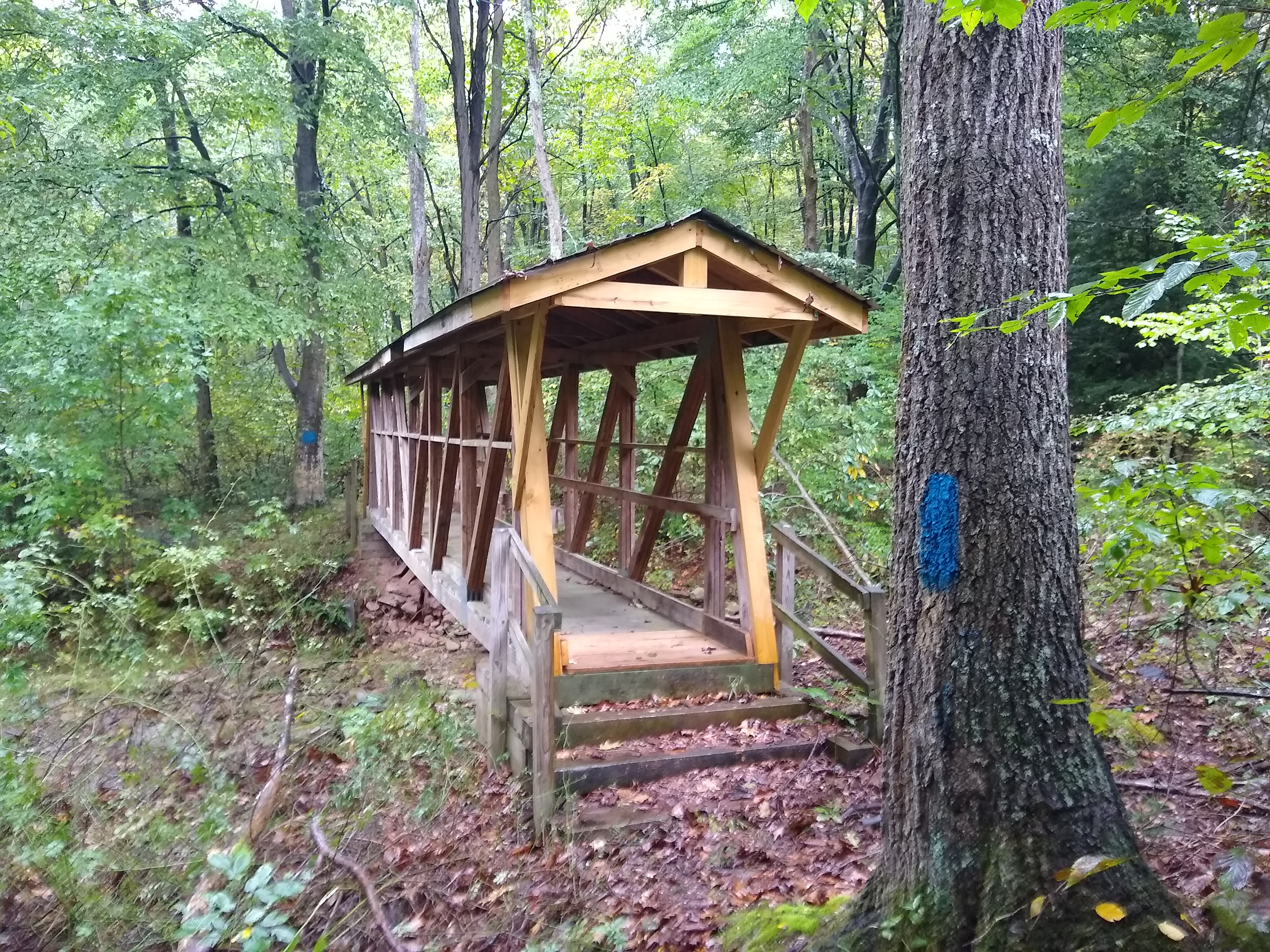
- An unusual covered footbridge on the Terrace Mountain Trail, over Tatman Run.
- Length: 25.9 mi (41.7 km)
- Location: Huntingdon County, Pennsylvania, US
- Trailheads: Weaver Falls Access Area near Saxton, Pennsylvania; Corbin Road near Huntingdon, Pennsylvania
- Use: Hiking, mountain biking
- Elevation change: High
- Difficulty: Strenuous
- Season: Year-round
- Hazards: Uneven and wet terrain, rattlesnakes, mosquitoes, ticks, black bears

The Terrace Mountain Trail is a 25.9-mile (41.7 km) linear hiking trail in south-central Pennsylvania, United States, which is mostly parallel to the shore of Raystown Lake. The trail is open to both hiking and mountain biking. The trail is maintained by the US Army Corps of Engineers as part of its management of the Raystown Lake complex. After the development of Raystown Dam and the artificial lake in 1973, the western flank of Terrace Mountain alongside the lake became part of a protected area mostly owned by the federal government, interspersed with some tracts of Pennsylvania's Rothrock State Forest and Trough Creek State Park. The Terrace Mountain Trail visits all these areas.

== Route ==
The route of the Terrace Mountain Trail is described here from southwest to northeast. The trail begins at Weaver Falls Bridge, at the southwestern end of Raystown Lake, near the point where the undammed upper segment of the Raystown Branch of the Juniata River enters the artificial reservoir. This in turn is near the town of Saxton. Heading to the northeast, the trail first follows an old gated road for about 0.5 mile and then climbs the side of Terrace Mountain. A Boy Scouts camp is passed at 2.8 miles, and the trail leads through the grounds of Raystown Resort starting at 5.4 miles. At 6.9 miles, the trail crosses Pennsylvania Route 994, followed by a scenic gorge formed by Tatman Run. The trail passes within sight of a parking lot at Tatman Run Recreation Area at 7.3 miles.

The next segment of the Terrace Mountain Trail features several views of Raystown Lake plus a few old shacks and abandoned buildings, and it traverses some areas that are below water when the reservoir is in flood stage. The trail crosses a border into Rothrock State Forest at 9.3 miles, and at 10.8 miles enters Trough Creek State Park by turning to the south and following an inlet in Raystown Lake formed by Great Trough Creek. While visiting several features at the state park, including an ice mine, the trail crosses a long footbridge over Great Trough Creek then turns back to the north, following the other side of the creek back toward Raystown Lake. At 18.0 miles, the trail passes a view of Seven Points Recreation Area on the other side of the reservoir. An overnight shelter is passed at 19.0 miles, and a view of Susquehannock Campground on the other side of the reservoir is passed at 20.0 miles. The trail crosses Hawn's Road at 23.1 miles, and then passes a view of Raystown Dam at 24.5 miles. The trail continues parallel to the once again undammed Raystown Branch of the Juniata River for another 1.4 miles, ending after a total of 25.9 miles at Corbin Road, south of Huntingdon.
