= Sugar Valley, Pennsylvania =

Valley in Clinton County, Pennsylvania, United States

Sugar Valley
- Location within Pennsylvania
- Length: 13 miles (21 km) northeast-southwest
- Width: 1 mile (1.6 km) average

Geography
- Location: Clinton County, Pennsylvania, United States
- Population centers: Tylersville and Loganton
- Borders on: Sugar Valley Mountain (west/north); Nittany Mountain (east/south)
- Coordinates: 41°01′N 77°19′W
- Interactive map of Sugar Valley

Sugar Valley is a valley in Clinton County, Pennsylvania.

The valley gathered its name from the rich abundance and overall size of the Sugar Maple trees it held which were discovered upon first settlement. The dimensions of the valley are approximately 18 mi (29 km) in length, running from east to west, and approximately 2 mi (3.2 km) in width.

Within Sugar Valley, it contains one borough, two townships with ten settlements within the townships. All administrative subdivisions hold background information from where their names originated.

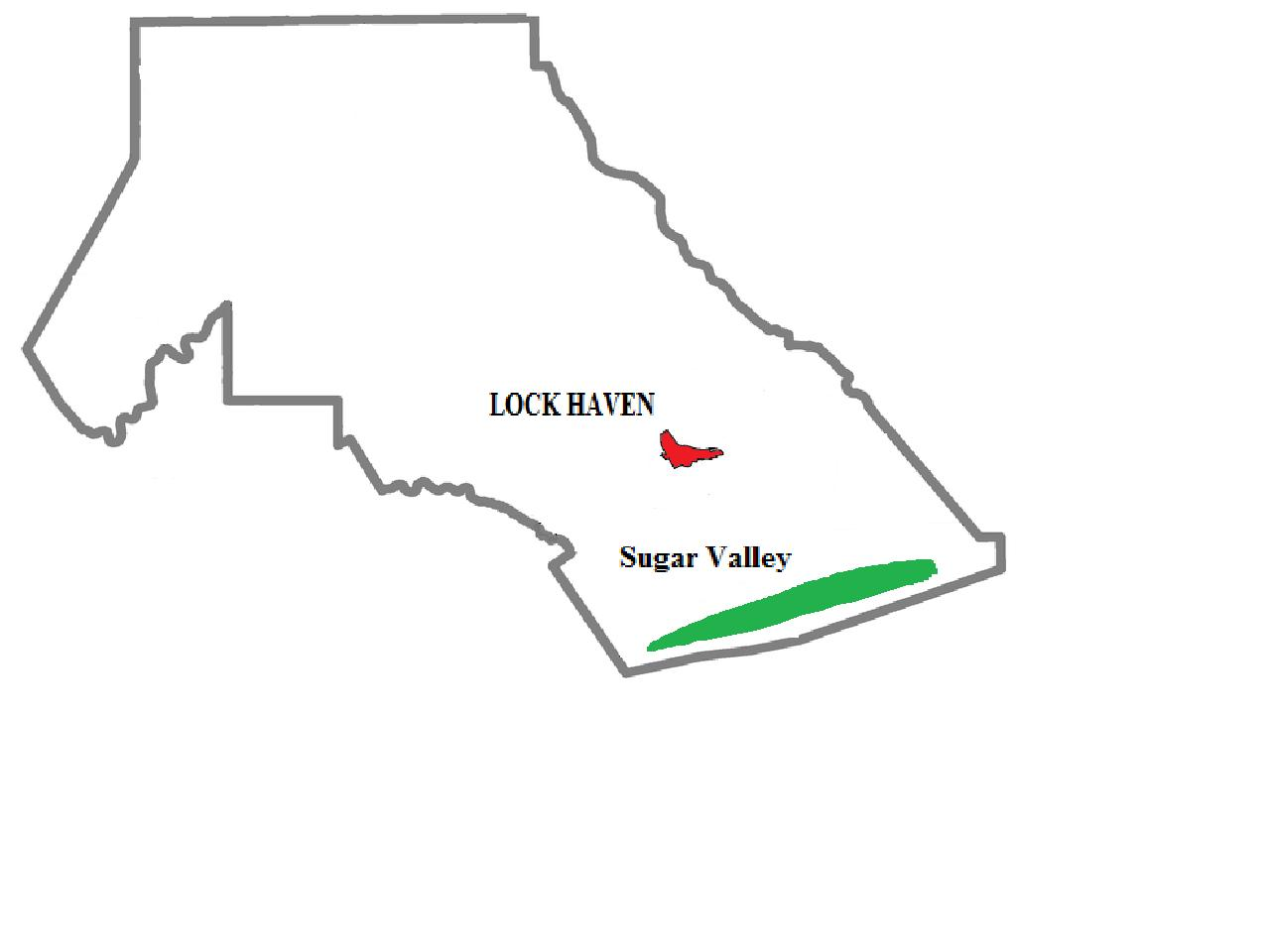
Location of Sugar Valley in Clinton County, Pennsylvania.

Location of Clinton County in Pennsylvania

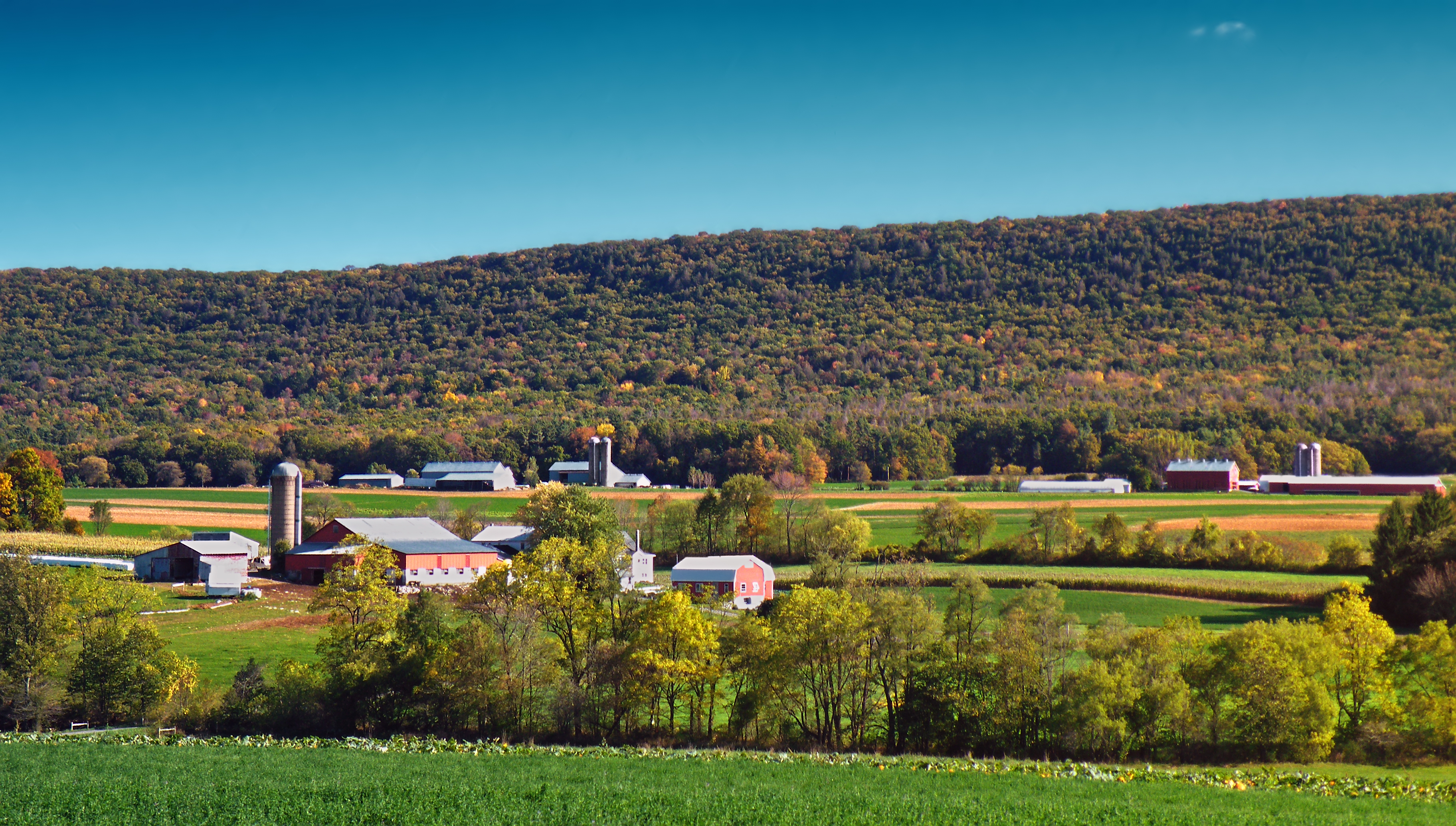
Sugar Valley

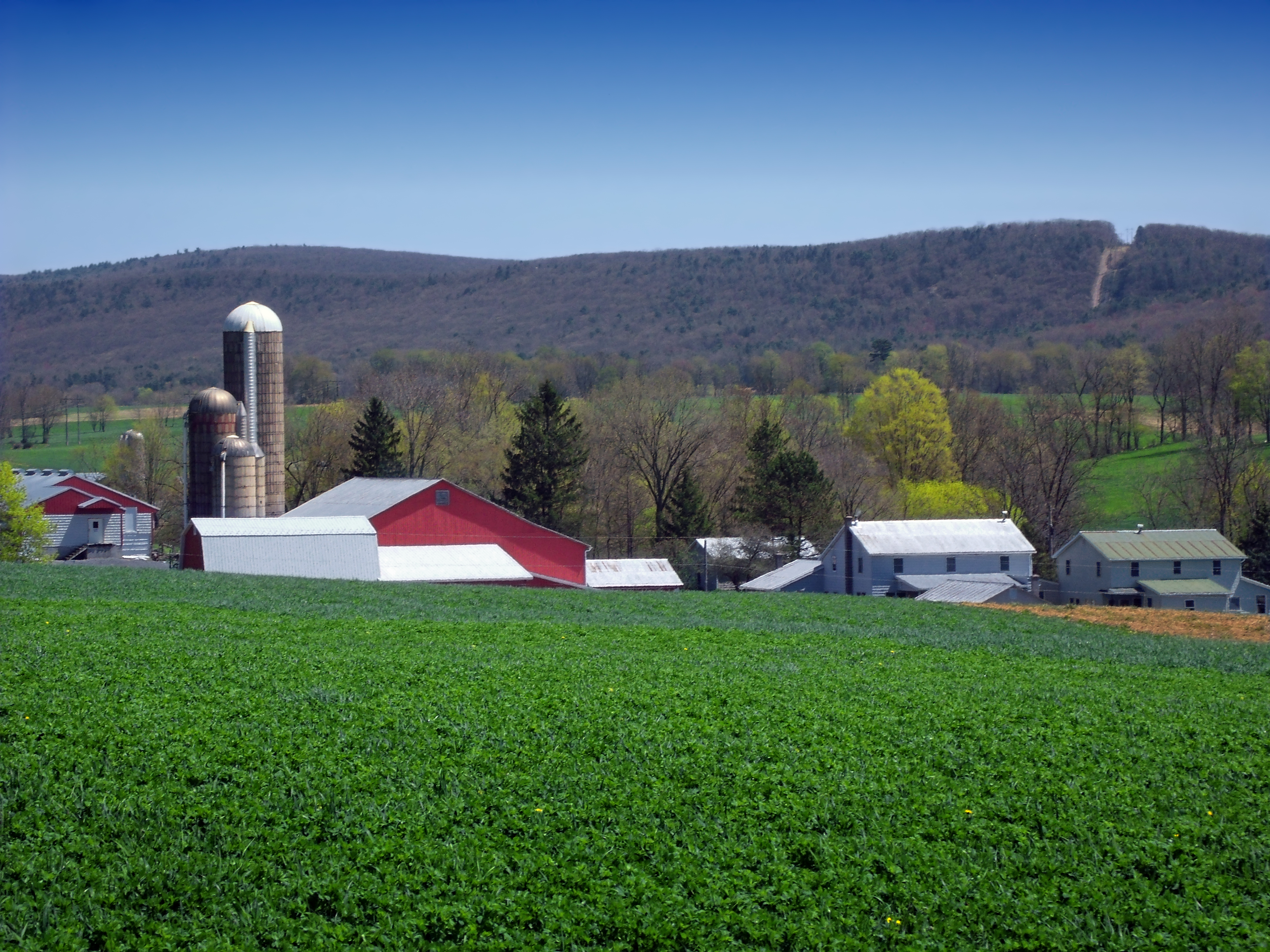
A farmstead in the valley

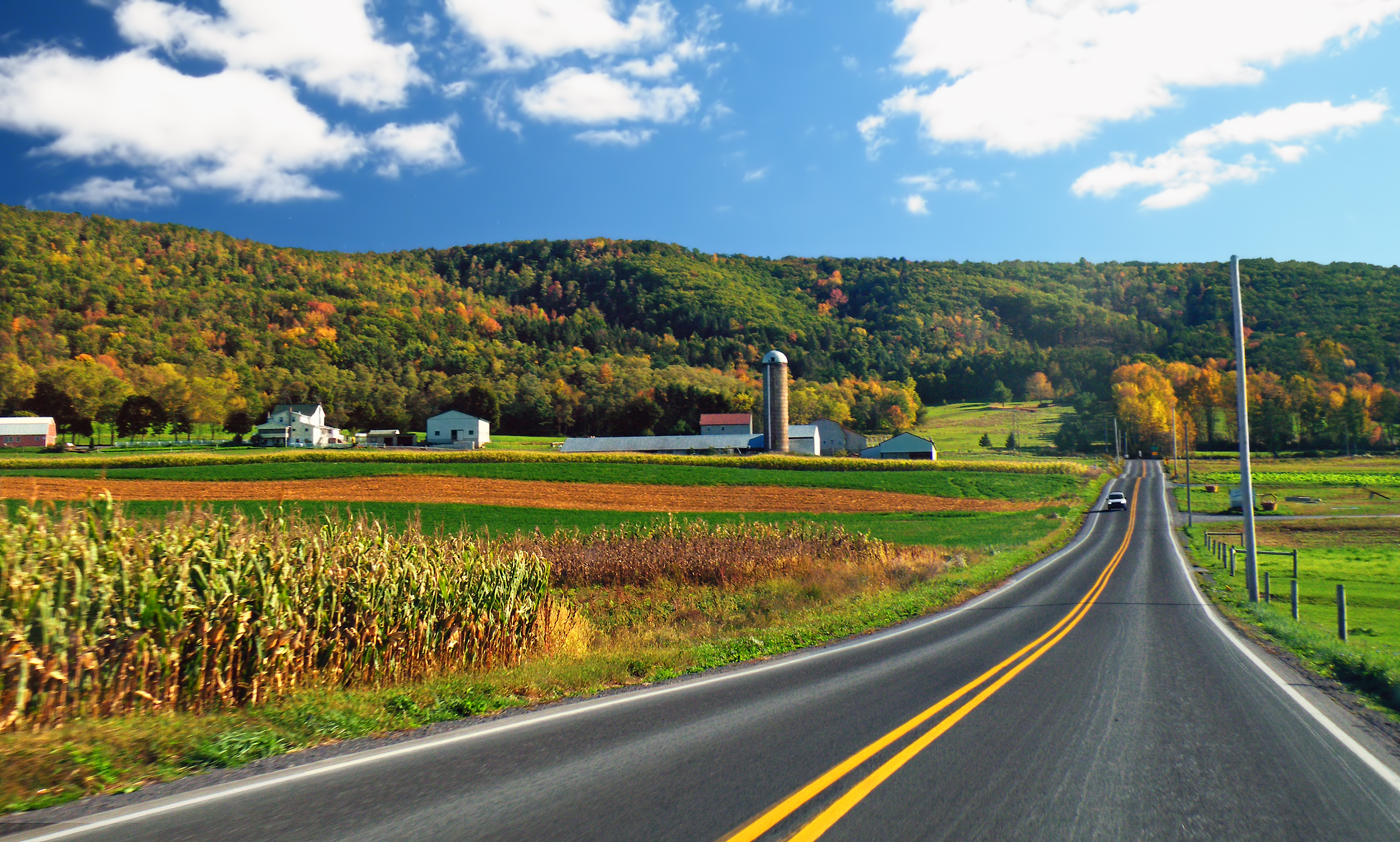
PA Route 477

== Geography ==
The two parallel mountains separating Sugar Valley include the Brush Valley mountain on the southern side and the Sugar Valley mountain on the northern. Two roads transverse the entire length of the valley and are commonly known as the Winter Road, which runs along the Brush Valley side, and the other being the Summer Road, which in turn parallels Sugar Valley mountain. The Winter Road obtains its name because the winter sun melts the snow on the north side of the valley first. The enclosing sandstone mountains slope to the limestone floor and shape Sugar Valley into a canoe-like form from a topical perspective.

== Timeline ==
1840 - Town of Loganton (formerly known as Logansville) was laid out by Anthony Kleckner.

1840: Logan & Greene Townships formed.

1842: Tylersville founded.

1861: First water company for the borough was incorporated.

1866: Booneville was established.

1872: P O S of A was established.

1874: Logan Mills covered bridge was constructed.

1886: Community band was formed.

1899: Bull Run one-room school constructed.

1906: Telephone services was introduced.

1918: Fire destroyed near three-fourths of the borough of Loganton.

1946: Sugar Valley Volunteer Fire Company was founded.

1955: Historical Bull Run school was closed.

1960: Interstate 80 was developed, running through parts of Sugar Valley.

1972: Amish introduced into community coming from Lancaster area.

1990: Celebration of 150 years of Loganton and Sugar Valley in Sesquicentennial.

2000: The Sugar Valley Rural Charter School was established in Loganton by the Sugar Valley Concerned Citizens.

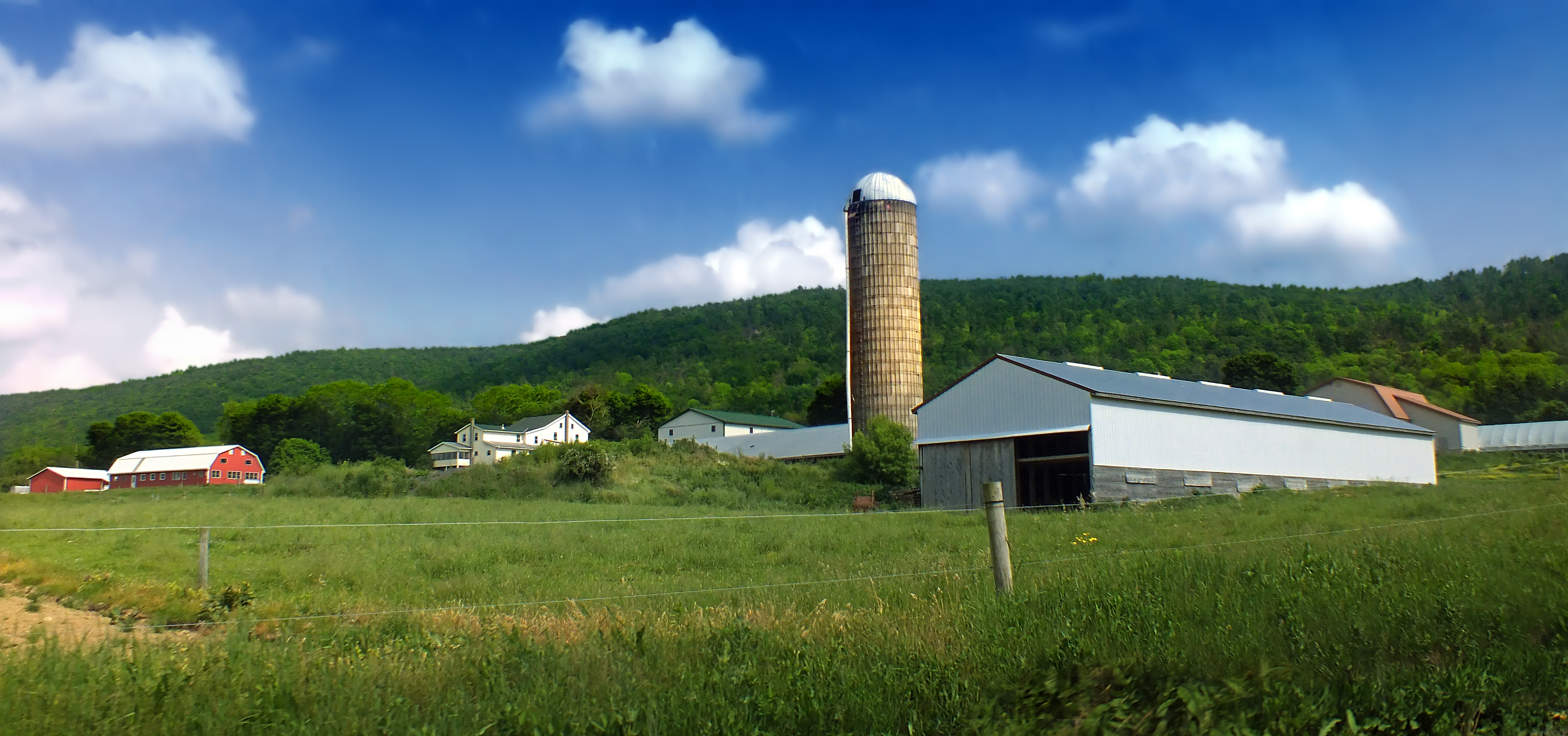
A farmstead in the valley

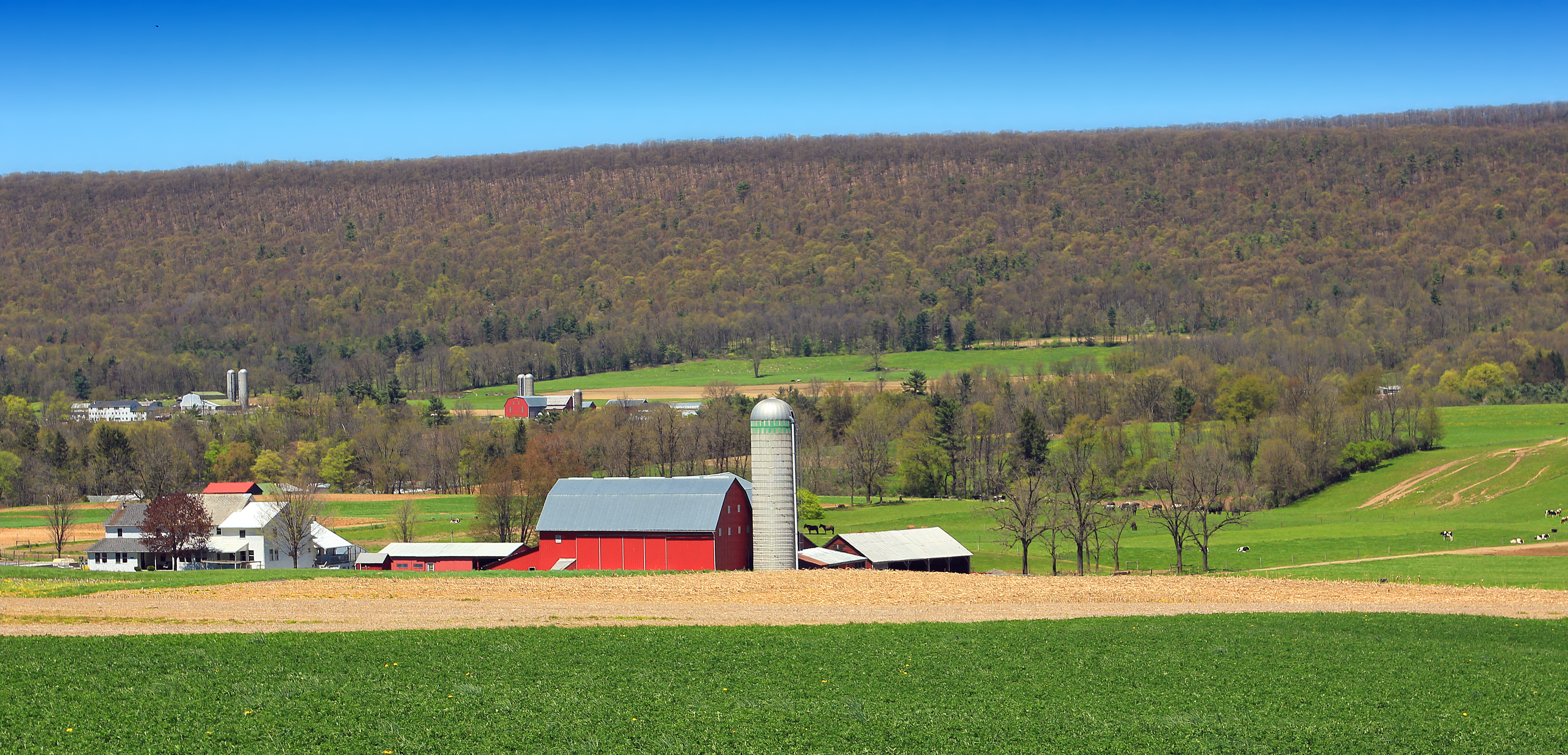
A farmstead of Logan Township

== Townships & boroughs ==
=== Loganton Borough ===
Originally called Logansville with its name derived from Chief Logan. the town originated in 1840 and later incorporated as a borough in 1864. Name being changed to Loganton by court action of the postal service on February 29, 1888, due to a town in York County already claiming Logansville.

=== Greene Township ===
Greene Township was formed in 1840 out of Logan Township. Its name derives from Captain Harry Greene of Milton and his six companions. They were killed in February 1801 at the east end of Sugar Valley in pursuit of a group of Indians known for stealing cattle and burning settlements throughout the Juniata and West Branch Valleys. This ended up being the last Indian massacre in Pennsylvania. A commemorative marker in Captain Greene's honor was erected and located off the Mile Run exit on Interstate 80 but has disappeared within the last twenty years. Contributing to Greene Township's growth, five villages and one borough were established: Bull Run, Carroll, Centerville, Eastville, Loganton and Rosecrans.

Bull Run

Originally called Sugar Grove because of the areas abundance of sugar maple trees but was changed to the nickname of Bull Run because the belief that it is located where buffalo crossed the mountains long ago here.

Carroll

Named after William Carroll who operated a furnace in the area. The historical commercial past from this village is completely gone.

Centerville

Name originated because of its location of being in the central portion of the valley. More commonly known today as Schracktown because of local family owned farm that occupies the majority of the area.

Eastville

Was once named Princetown but was changed to Eastville with a more simple explanation of its location - being at the east end.

Rosecrans

Named after General Rosecrans of the Civil War by postmaster George Wagner.

=== Logan Township ===
Logan Township was formed in 1839 out of Miles Township which is located in Centre County. Its name also derives from the Indian Chief Logan. Contributing to Logan Township's growth, four villages were established: Booneville, Greenburr, Logan Mills and Tylersville.

Booneville

John and Ralph Boone named the town after themselves. They laid it out in 1866.

Greenburr

Originally known as Greenville for its location among vast amounts of green trees was later changed to what is it known as today.

Logan Mills

Colonel Anthony Kleckner established Logan Mills. Just as Loganton and Logan Township received their names from Chief Logan, this is also where Logan mills got its own as well.

Tylersville

Founded by Squire M.D. Rockey in 1842, he named the village after the President of the United States at the time which was John Tyler.

== Population ==
Year	Logan Twp.	Greene Twp.	Loganton	Total
1830	601	---	---	601
1860	832	1265	---	2097
1890	941	1189	390	2520
1920	853	957	254	2064
1950	687	857	346	1890
1980	737	1002	474	2213

== Attractions ==
There are many tourism attractions in Sugar Valley, including: Logan Mills covered bridge, Logan Mills grist mill, Sulphur Springs, Amish communities, fishing creek, the state forest and state game lands (surrounding mountains), Rosecrans Reservoir, Schrack's farm, Meyer's Dairy farm, Tea Springs, Country Smoke Jam (bluegrass festival), Booneville campground, Tylersville Fish Hatchery, The Rosecrans Falls, Bull Run school.

== Notable people ==
- James Allister Jenkins, a Canadian–American mathematician, specializing in complex analysis, who spent his summers east of Loganton.
