= Spry, Pennsylvania =

Unincorporated place in Pennsylvania, US

Spry
- Census-designated place
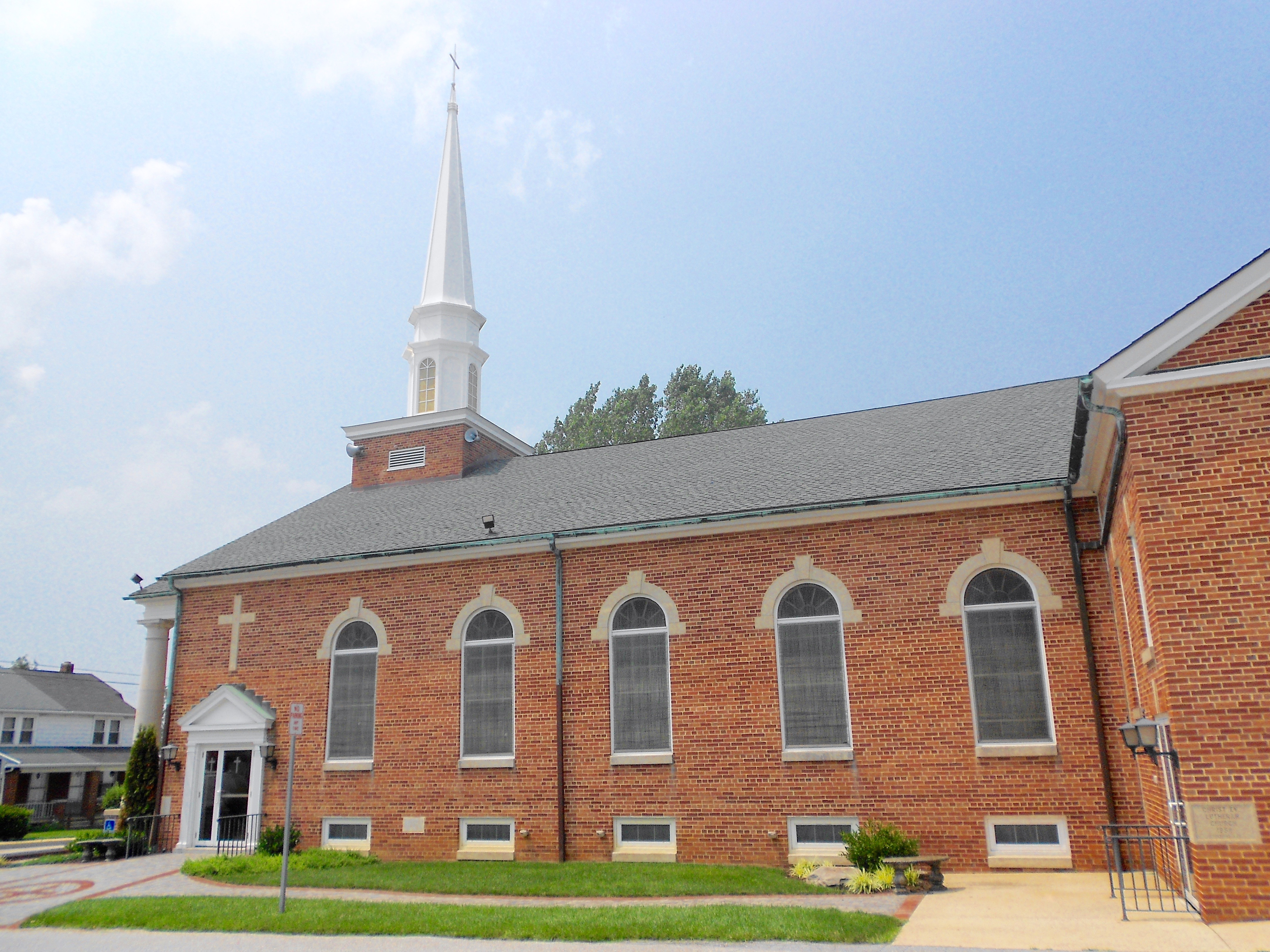
- Christ Lutheran Church

- Location in York County and the U.S. state of Pennsylvania.
- Coordinates: 39°54′45″N 76°41′14″W
- Country: United States
- State: Pennsylvania
- County: York
- Township: York

Area
  - Total: 2.6 sq mi (6.7 km^{2})
  - Land: 2.6 sq mi (6.7 km^{2})

Population (2010)
  - Total: 4,891
  - Density: 1,900/sq mi (730/km^{2})
- Time zone: UTC-5 (Eastern (EST))
  - Summer (DST): UTC-4 (EDT)

Spry is a census-designated place (CDP) that is located in York County, Pennsylvania, United States. The population is 4,891 as of the 2010 census.

== Geography ==
Spry is located at 39°54′45″N 76°41′14″W (39.912566, -76.687216) in York Township, south of the city of York.

According to the United States Census Bureau, the CDP has a total area of 2.6 square miles (6.7 km^{2}), all land.

== History ==
Spry was originally named Intersville, in honor of the individual who purchased the land on which the town is now located. The name was changed to Spry for reasons that remain unclear. This quaint town is notable for its robust cigar production during the early 1900s. Most of Spry's homes were constructed between 1920 and 1960, predominantly featuring charming brick Cape Cods and ranch-style houses, alongside a smattering of newer constructions. The primary school district serving the area is Dallastown, with York Township Elementary being the sole school within Spry. This school was established between 1935 and 1945, replacing a former schoolhouse located near Spry Church, which was demolished around 1970 due to a decline in enrollment.

== Demographics ==
At the time of the 2000 census, there were 4,903 people, 2,125 households, and 1,411 families living in the CDP.

The population density was 1,902.7 inhabitants per square mile (734.6/km^{2}). There were 2,204 housing units at an average density of 855.3 per square mile (330.2/km^{2}).

The racial makeup of the CDP was 96.15% White, 1.51% African American, 0.12% Native American, 1.20% Asian, 0.14% from other races, and 0.88% from two or more races. Hispanic or Latino of any race were 1.31%.

Of the 2,125 households documented by the federal census, 26.7% had children who were under the age of 18 living with them, 55.1% were married couples living together, 9.0% had a female householder with no husband present, and 33.6% were non-families. 28.4% of households were one-person households and 10.1% were one-person households with residents who were aged 65 or older. The average household size was 2.27 and the average family size was 2.77.

The age distribution was 21.6% under the age of 18, 5.8% from 18 to 24, 29.7% from 25 to 44, 26.0% from 45 to 64, and 16.8% 65 or older. The median age was 41 years.

For every 100 females, there were 93.0 males. For every 100 females who were aged 18 and older, there were 89.2 males.

The median household income was $49,240 and the median family income was $57,344. Males had a median income of $41,436 compared with that of $31,587 for females.

The per capita income for the CDP was $24,564.

Approximately 3.5% of families and 5.2% of the population were living below the poverty line, including 6.0% of those who were under the age of 18 and 6.3% of those who were aged 65 or older.

== Gallery ==
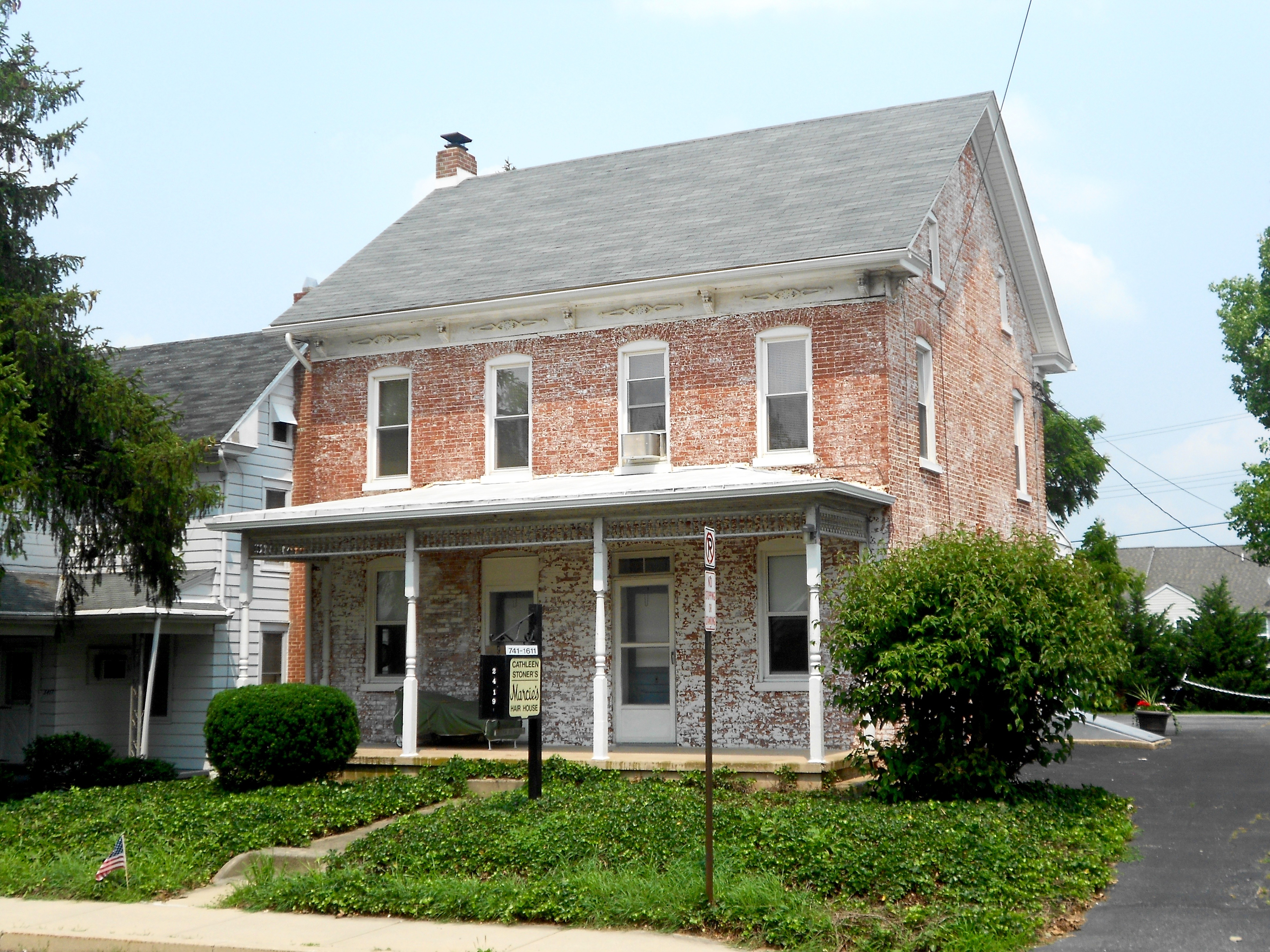
On Queen St. (SR 74)

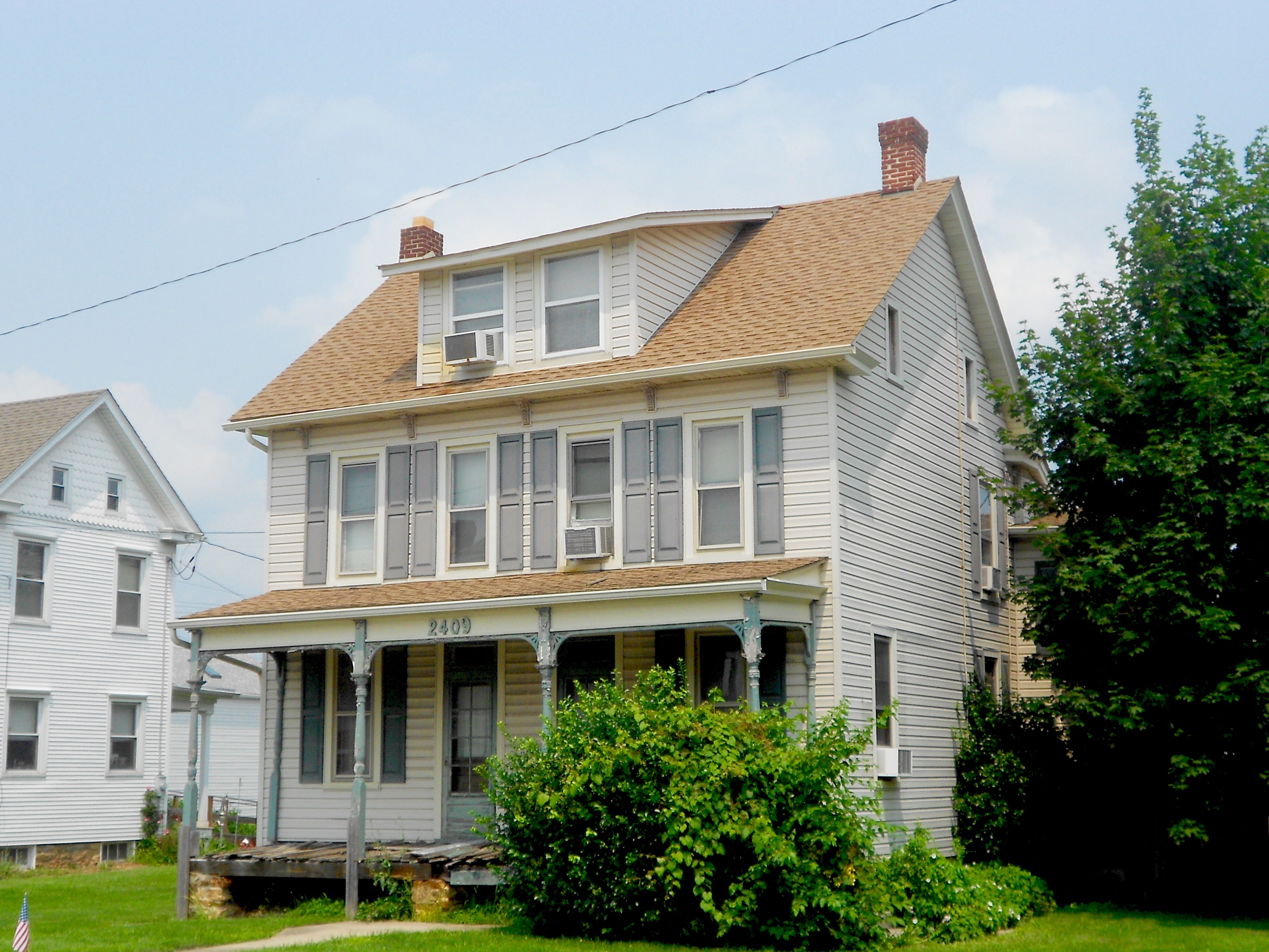
On Queen St.
