= Baker Bridge =

Historic landmark in the United States

- U.S. National Register of Historic Places
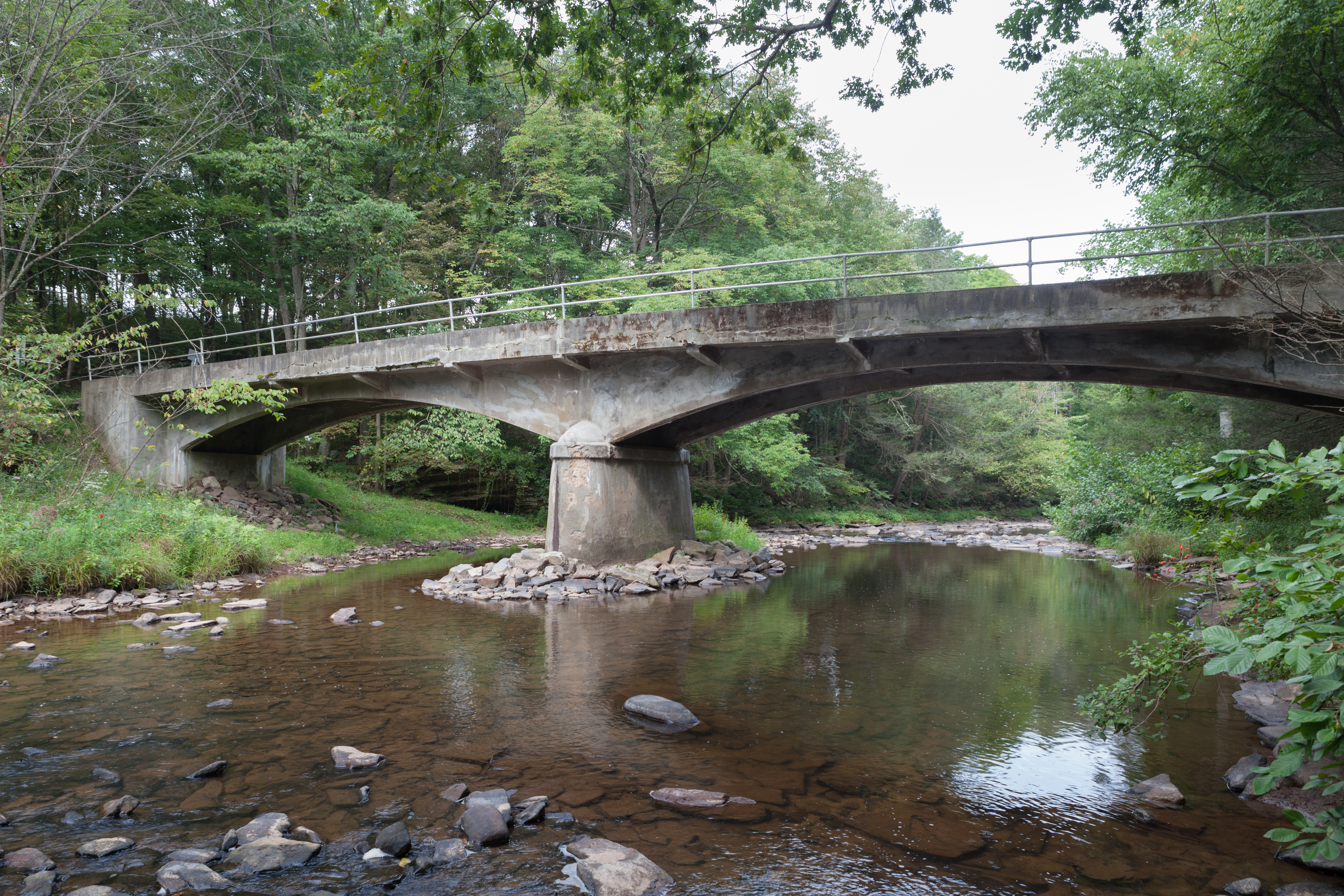
- Looking at the southeast side of the span from the east side of Great Trough Creek

- Location within Pennsylvania Location within the United States
- Location: Township Route 370 over Great Trough Creek, 1 mile (1.6 km) east of Newburg, Todd Township, Pennsylvania
- Coordinates: 40°17′10″N 78°7′17″W
- Area: less than one acre
- Built: 1917
- Architectural style: Reinforced concrete closed spandrel arch bridge
- MPS: Industrial Resources of Huntingdon County, 1780-1939 MPS
- NRHP reference No.: 90000411
- Added to NRHP: March 20, 1990

Baker Bridge, also known as Huntingdon County Bridge No. 14, is a historic reinforced concrete closed spandrel arch bridge spanning the Great Trough Creek and located at Todd Township, Huntingdon County, Pennsylvania. It is on Township Route 377 (Newburg Park Road). It was built in 1917, and measures 114-foot-long (35 m) and has a 17-foot-wide (5.2 m) bridge deck. It has two arch spans.

It was added to the National Register of Historic Places in 1990.
