= Tyler Run, Pennsylvania =

Unincorporated place in Pennsylvania, US

Tyler Run
- Census-designated place
- Location in York County and the state of Pennsylvania.
- Coordinates: 39°55′50″N 76°42′04″W
- Country: United States
- State: Pennsylvania
- County: York
- Township: York

Area
  - Total: 0.97 sq mi (2.5 km^{2})
  - Land: 0.97 sq mi (2.5 km^{2})
- Elevation: 600 ft (180 m)

Population (2010)
  - Total: 1,901
  - Density: 2,000/sq mi (760/km^{2})
- Time zone: UTC-5 (Eastern (EST))
  - Summer (DST): UTC-4 (EDT)
- ZIP code: 17403
- Area code: 717
- GNIS feature ID: 2584519

Tyler Run is a census-designated place (CDP) in York County, Pennsylvania, United States. The population was 1,901 at the 2010 census. The area was part of the Tyler Run-Queens Gate CDP at the 2000 census.

== Geography ==
Tyler Run is located in York Township, just south of the city of York.

According to the United States Census Bureau, the CDP has a total area of 1.0 square mile (2.6 km^{2}), all land.
