= Paradise Furnace =

- U.S. National Register of Historic Places
- U.S. Historic district
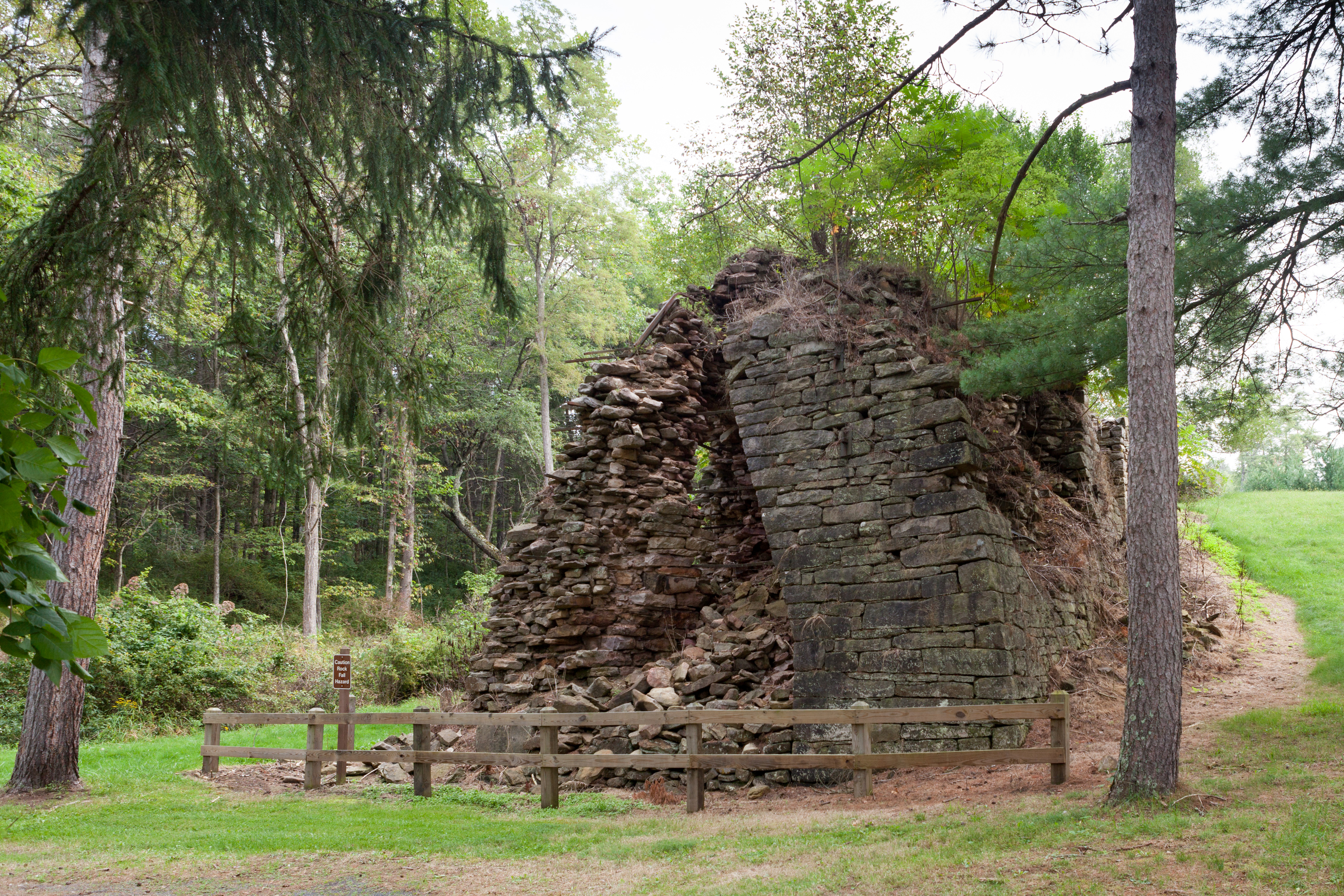
- West side of the furnace stack in September 2014

- Location within Pennsylvania Location within the United States
- Location: 5 miles (8.0 km) southeast of Entriken in Trough Creek State Park, Todd Township, Pennsylvania
- Coordinates: 40°18′39″N 78°07′34″W
- Area: 3 acres (1.2 ha)
- Architectural style: Georgian
- MPS: Industrial Resources of Huntingdon County, 1780-1939 MPS
- NRHP reference No.: 90000403
- Added to NRHP: March 20, 1990

The Paradise Furnace, also known as the Mary Anne Furnace, is a national historic district that is located in Trough Creek State Park in Todd Township in Huntingdon County, Pennsylvania.

It was listed on the National Register of Historic Places in 1990.

== History and architectural features ==
This consists of two contributing buildings and one contributing structure that are associated with a former iron furnace. They are the ironmaster's mansion, furnace stack, and a log workers' house. The ironmaster's mansion, which was built during the 1830s, is a two-and-one-half-story stone house that was designed in the Georgian style.

The furnace stack dates to the 1830s, and is a twenty-eight-foot, square, coursed rubble stone structure, which measures between fifteen and twenty feet tall. The ironworks operated from the late-eighteenth century into the mid-nineteenth century, when economic conditions caused it to be fired.

The two-story log house dates to the late-eighteenth century. It was converted for use as the park visitor center/museum in 1982.
