= James Allister Jenkins =

Canadian–American mathematician

James Allister Jenkins (born 23 September 1923, Toronto, Ontario; – 16 September 2012, Lock Haven, Pennsylvania) was a Canadian–American mathematician, specializing in complex analysis.

== Early life ==
James A. Jenkins was born 23 September 1923 in Toronto, Ontario and grew up in what is now known as Davisville Village. His father, James Thomas Jenkins, was the head the mathematics department of Jarvis Collegiate Institute. His mother, Maude Zuern, taught high school classics prior to her wedding. The Jenkins family spent their summers at the family farmstead in Sugar Valley, Pennsylvania.

== Education and career ==
Jenkins attended Davisville Public School and Jarvis Collegiate Institute, the latter from which graduated in 1940. Showing promise from a young age, he won the Prince of Wales' prize, the Reuben Wells Leonard scholarship in general proficiency at University College, the Edward Blake scholarship in algebra, geometry, physics, and chemistry. However, he was required to give up many of the university scholarships he had won, as the regulations of the time allowed students to hold no more than two, including the First Edward Blake scholarship in French and Latin, First Edward Blake scholarship in French and German, the Edward Blake in any pair of French, German, Italian, and Spanish, and the second Edward Blake in mathematics and physics. He also won the first Carter scholarship for Toronto, separate from these university scholarships.

Jenkins moved from Toronto to the United States to attend graduate school in mathematics at Harvard University. There he received his PhD in 1948 with thesis Some Problems in Complex Analysis under the supervision Lars Ahlfors, one of the first two Fields laureates. After some time at Harvard as a postdoc, Jenkins taught and did research at Johns Hopkins University for several years. He became, by 1955, a professor at the University of Notre Dame and, by 1963, a professor at Washington University in St. Louis, where he eventually retired as professor emeritus. He spent several sabbaticals at the Institute for Advanced Study.

Jenkins was the author or coauthor of over 137 research publications in complex analysis. He coauthored 6 papers with Marston Morse.

In their 1953 paper in Fundamenta Mathematicae, "Morse and Jenkins solve the difficult problem of showing that on a simply connected Riemann surface every pseudo-harmonic function has a pseudo-conjugate. Thus in particular they show that on such a surface any pseudo-harmonic function can be made harmonic by a change of the conformai structure."

Morse and Jenkins basically settled "the simply connected case, where they extended and completed earlier work of Kaplan, Boothby and others ..." and then in their 1953 paper in the Proceedings of the National Academy of Sciences they discussed the same problems on doubly connected surfaces. "In particular they there give a very complete analysis of the structure of the level sets of a pseudo-harmonic function."

In 1962 Jenkins was an Invited Speaker at the International Congress of Mathematicians in Stockholm.

== Selected publications ==
=== Articles ===
- Jenkins, J. A. (1949). "Some problems in conformal mapping". Transactions of the American Mathematical Society. 67 (2): 327. doi:10.1090/S0002-9947-1949-0032748-X.
- Hirschman, I. I.; Jenkins, J. A. (1950). "Note on a result of Levine and Lifschitz". Proceedings of the American Mathematical Society. 1 (3): 390. doi:10.1090/S0002-9939-1950-0036346-7.
- Hirschman, I. I.; Jenkins, J. A. (1950). "On lacunary Dirichlet series". Proceedings of the American Mathematical Society. 1 (4): 512. doi:10.1090/S0002-9939-1950-0036836-7.
- Jenkins, James A. (1952). "Remarks on "Some problems in conformal mapping"". Proceedings of the American Mathematical Society. 3: 147. doi:10.1090/S0002-9939-1952-0045828-5.
- Jenkins, James A. (1953). "Another remark on "Some problems in conformal mapping"". Proceedings of the American Mathematical Society. 4 (6): 978. doi:10.1090/S0002-9939-1953-0058716-6.
- Jenkins, James A. (1953). "Various remarks on univalent functions". Proceedings of the American Mathematical Society. 4 (4): 595. doi:10.1090/S0002-9939-1953-0056699-6.
- Jenkins, James A. (1954). "A general coefficient theorem". Transactions of the American Mathematical Society. 77 (2): 262. doi:10.1090/S0002-9947-1954-0064146-9.
- Jenkins, James A. (1954). "On the local structure of the trajectories of a quadratic differential". Proceedings of the American Mathematical Society. 5 (3): 357. doi:10.1090/S0002-9939-1954-0062227-2.
- Jenkins, James A. (1955). "On circularly symmetric functions". Proceedings of the American Mathematical Society. 6 (4): 620. doi:10.1090/S0002-9939-1955-0072219-6.
- Jenkins, James A. (1955). "On Bieberbach-Eilenberg functions. II". Transactions of the American Mathematical Society. 78 (2): 510. doi:10.1090/S0002-9947-1955-0067186-X.
- Jenkins, James A. (1955). "On circumferentially mean $p$-valent functions". Transactions of the American Mathematical Society. 79 (2): 423. doi:10.1090/S0002-9947-1955-0071538-1.
- Jenkins, James A. (1956). "Some theorems on boundary distortion". Transactions of the American Mathematical Society. 81 (2): 477. doi:10.1090/S0002-9947-1956-0076862-5.
- Jenkins, James A. (1958). "On a canonical conformal mapping of J. L. Walsh". Transactions of the American Mathematical Society. 88: 207. doi:10.1090/S0002-9947-1958-0088549-5.
- Jenkins, James A. (1960). "An extension of the general coefficient theorem". Transactions of the American Mathematical Society. 95 (3): 387. doi:10.1090/S0002-9947-1960-0117346-6.
- Jenkins, James A. (1960). "On certain coefficients of univalent functions. II". Transactions of the American Mathematical Society. 96 (3): 534. doi:10.1090/S0002-9947-1960-0122978-5.
- Jenkins, James A. (1962). "On a paper of Reich concerning minimal slit domains". Proceedings of the American Mathematical Society. 13 (3): 358. doi:10.1090/S0002-9939-1962-0142739-8.
- Jenkins, James A. (1962). "The general coefficient theorem and certain applications". Bulletin of the American Mathematical Society. 68: 1–10. doi:10.1090/S0002-9904-1962-10670-3.
- Jenkins, James A. (1963). "An addendum to the general coefficient theorem". Transactions of the American Mathematical Society. 107: 125. doi:10.1090/S0002-9947-1963-0147639-0.
- Jenkins, James A. (1965). "On Bieberbach-Eilenberg functions. III". Transactions of the American Mathematical Society. 119 (2): 195. doi:10.1090/S0002-9947-1965-0181742-6.
- Jenkins, James A. (1966). "On a result of Nehari". Proceedings of the American Mathematical Society. 17: 62. doi:10.1090/S0002-9939-1966-0188427-7.
- Jenkins, James A. (1968). "On an inequality considered by Robertson". Proceedings of the American Mathematical Society. 19 (3): 549. doi:10.1090/S0002-9939-1968-0224802-1.
- Jenkins, James A. (1969). "A uniqueness result in conformal mapping". Proceedings of the American Mathematical Society. 22 (2): 324. doi:10.1090/S0002-9939-1969-0241619-3.
- Jenkins, James A. (1972). "A remark on "pairs" of regular functions". Proceedings of the American Mathematical Society. 31: 119. doi:10.1090/S0002-9939-1972-0291426-0.
- Jenkins, James A. (1974). "Some remarks on Weierstrass points". Proceedings of the American Mathematical Society. 44: 121. doi:10.1090/S0002-9939-1974-0328063-7.
- De Temple, Duane W.; Jenkins, James A. (1977). "A Loewner approach to a coefficient inequality for bounded univalent functions". Proceedings of the American Mathematical Society. 65: 125. doi:10.1090/S0002-9939-1977-0444932-4.
- Jenkins, James A.; Oikawa, Kōtaro (1977). "On Ahlfors' "second fundamental inequality"". Proceedings of the American Mathematical Society. 62 (2): 266. doi:10.1090/S0002-9939-1977-0437732-2.
- Jenkins, James A. (1982). "A uniqueness result in conformal mapping. II". Proceedings of the American Mathematical Society. 85 (2): 231. doi:10.1090/S0002-9939-1982-0652448-7.
- Jenkins, James A. (1991). "Some estimates for harmonic measures. II". Proceedings of the American Mathematical Society. 111 (2): 441. doi:10.1090/S0002-9939-1991-1050021-8.
- Jenkins, James A. (1993). "Some estimates for harmonic measures. III". Proceedings of the American Mathematical Society. 119: 199. doi:10.1090/S0002-9939-1993-1162090-7.
- Jenkins, James A. (1996). "On comb domains". Proceedings of the American Mathematical Society. 124: 187–191. doi:10.1090/S0002-9939-96-03034-1.

=== Books ===
- Univalent Functions and conformal mapping. Springer. 1965. ISBN 978-3-642-88563-1. Jenkins, James A. (6 December 2012). Univalent Functions and Conformal Mapping: Reihe: Moderne Funktionentheorie. Springer. ISBN 9783642885631.
