= Truman, Pennsylvania =

Unincorporated community in Pennsylvania, US

- Unincorporated community
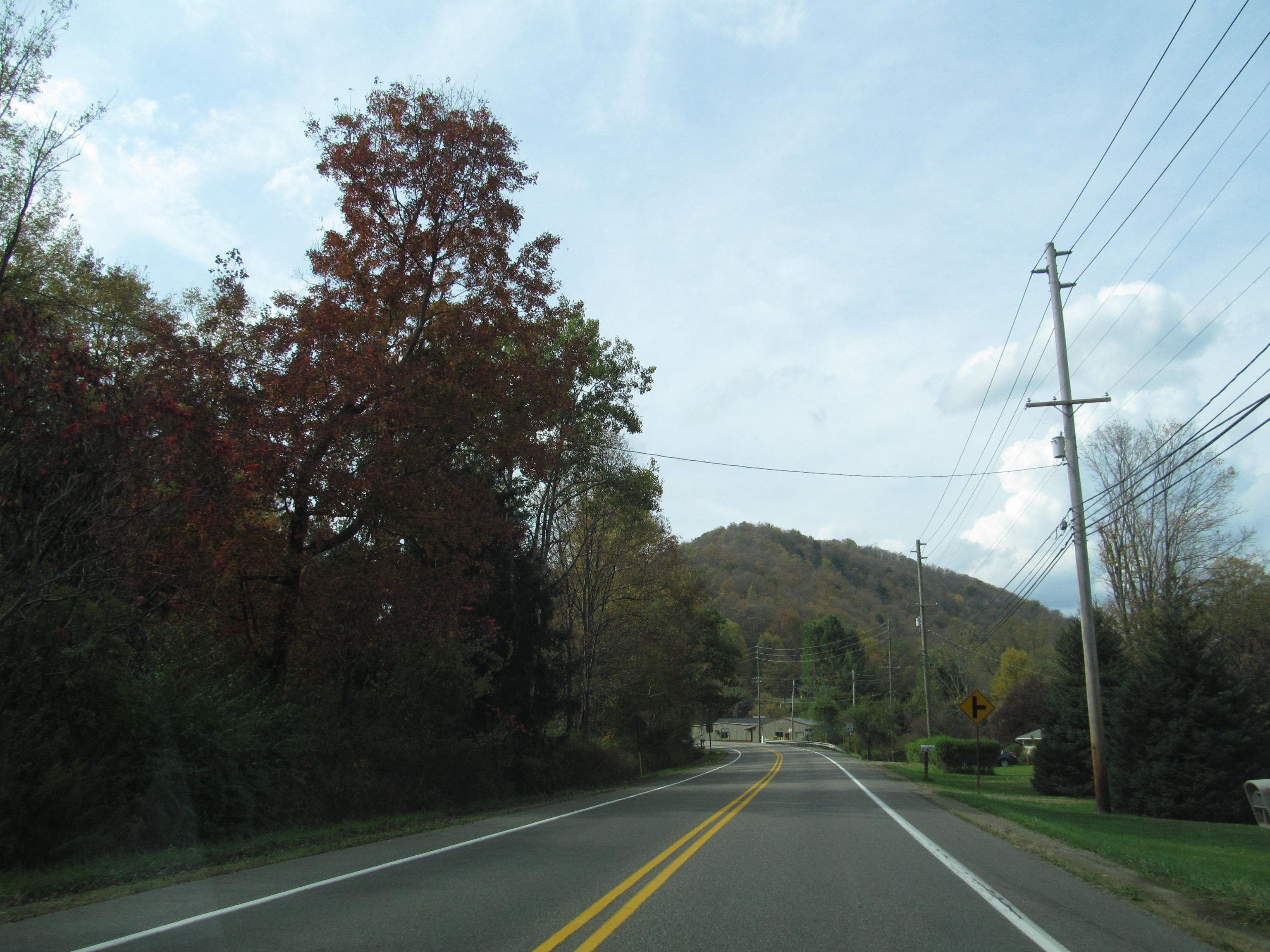
- PA 120 westbound in Truman

- Location within Pennsylvania
- Coordinates: 41°28′37″N 78°22′07″W
- Country: United States
- State: Pennsylvania
- County: Cameron
- Elevation: 1,227 ft (374 m)
- Time zone: UTC-5 (Eastern (EST))
  - Summer (DST): UTC-4 (EDT)
- Area code: 814
- GNIS feature ID: 1199698

Truman is an unincorporated community in Cameron County, Pennsylvania, United States.
