= Queens Gate, Pennsylvania =

Unincorporated place in Pennsylvania, US

Queens Gate
- Census-designated place
- Location in York County and the state of Pennsylvania.
- Coordinates: 39°56′26″N 76°41′15″W
- Country: United States
- State: Pennsylvania
- County: York
- Township: York

Area
  - Total: 0.58 sq mi (1.49 km^{2})
  - Land: 0.58 sq mi (1.49 km^{2})
  - Water: 0 sq mi (0.00 km^{2})

Population (2020)
  - Total: 1,480
  - Density: 2,565.7/sq mi (990.64/km^{2})
- Time zone: UTC-5 (Eastern (EST))
  - Summer (DST): UTC-4 (EDT)
- ZIP code: 17403
- Area code: 717
- FIPS code: 42-63116

Queens Gate is a census-designated place (CDP) in York County, Pennsylvania, United States. The population was 1,464 at the 2010 census. The area was part of the Tyler Run-Queens Gate CDP at the 2000 census.

== Geography ==
Queens Gate is located at 39°56′26″N 76°41′15″W (39.9406, -76.6874) in York Township, just south of the city of York.

According to the United States Census Bureau, the CDP has a total area of 0.6 square miles (1.6 km^{2}), all land.

== Demographics ==
Historical population
Census	Pop.	Note	%±
2020	1,480		—
U.S. Decennial Census
