= Tolna, Pennsylvania =

Unincorporated community in Pennsylvania, U.S.

Coordinates: 39°45′43″N 76°39′06″W

Tolna is an unincorporated community in York County, Pennsylvania, United States. Tolna is located near Pennsylvania Route 851.
