= Tamiment, Pennsylvania =

Unincorporated community in Pennsylvania, US

- Unincorporated community
- Location within Pennsylvania Location within the United States
- Coordinates: 41°08′32″N 75°01′38″W
- Country: United States
- State: Pennsylvania
- County: Pike
- Township: Lehman
- Elevation: 1,194 ft (364 m)
- Time zone: UTC-5 (Eastern (EST))
  - Summer (DST): UTC-4 (EDT)
- ZIP code: 18371
- Area codes: 570 and 272
- GNIS feature ID: 1189253

Tamiment is an unincorporated community located in Lehman Township in Pike County, Pennsylvania, United States. Tamiment is located along Bushkill Falls Road, north of Bushkill.
