= Great Trough Creek =

River in Pennsylvania, United States

Coordinates: 40.23128°N 78.06356°W

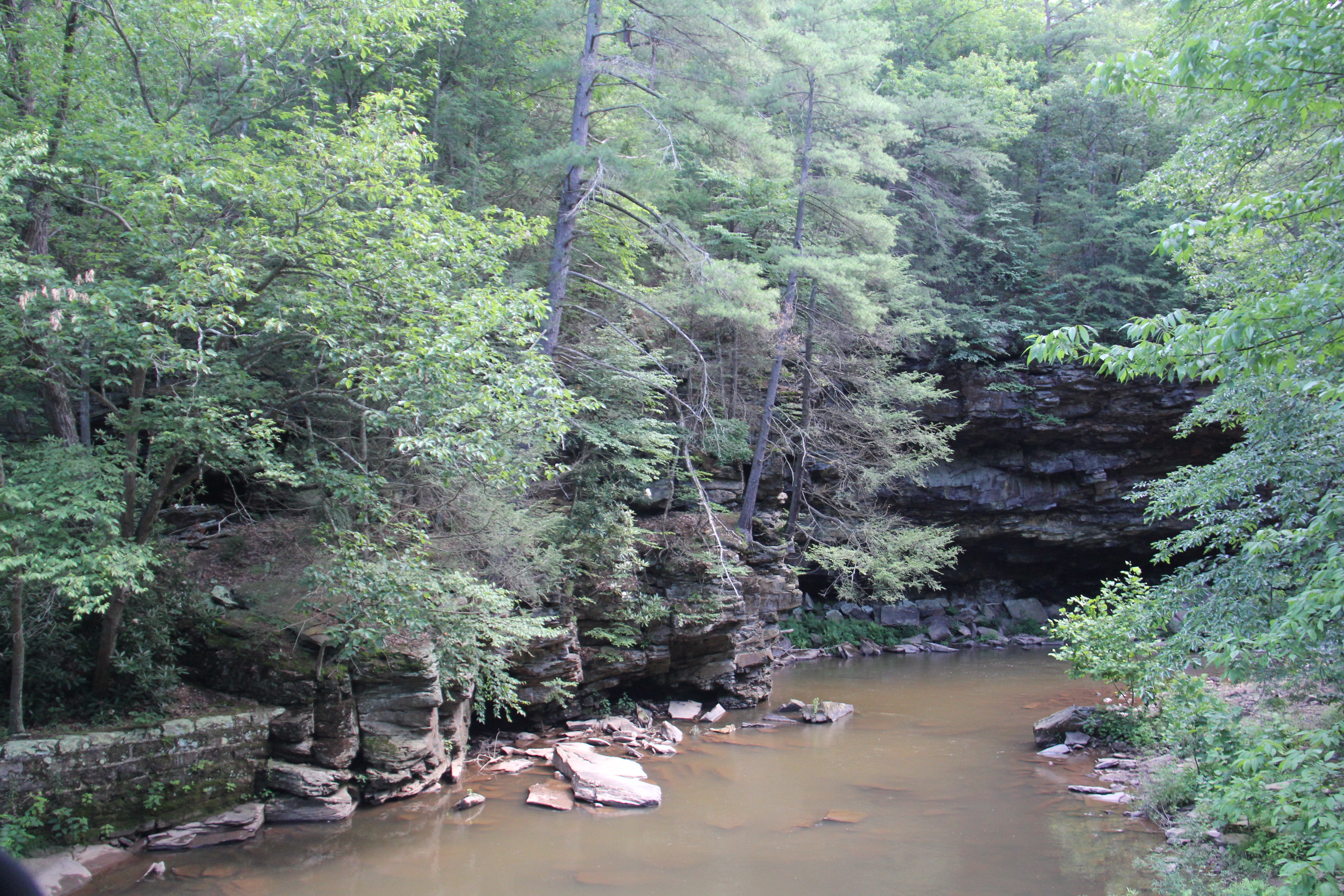
The creek at Trough Creek State Park

Great Trough Creek is a tributary of the Raystown Branch Juniata River in Bedford, Fulton and Huntingdon counties in Pennsylvania in the United States. The creek is 33.2 miles (53.4 km) long, flows northeast for half its length then northwest, and its watershed is 85.4 square miles (221.2 km^{2}) in area.

== Bridges ==
- The Baker Bridge crosses Great Trough Creek at Todd Township, Huntingdon County, Pennsylvania.

== See also ==
- List of rivers of Pennsylvania
