= Turkeytown, Pennsylvania =

Unincorporated community in Pennsylvania, US

Turkeytown
- Unincorporated community
- Location within the U.S. state of Pennsylvania Turkeytown (the United States)
- Coordinates: 40°11′42″N 79°43′48″W
- Country: United States
- State: Pennsylvania
- County: Westmoreland
- Elevation: 1,138 ft (347 m)
- Time zone: UTC-5 (Eastern (EST))
  - Summer (DST): UTC-4 (EDT)
- GNIS feature ID: 1189956

Turkeytown is a small village in South Huntingdon Township, Westmoreland County, Pennsylvania, United States. It is located near Interstate 70 on Route 31.
