= Turkey City, Pennsylvania =

Unincorporated community in Pennsylvania, US

- Unincorporated community
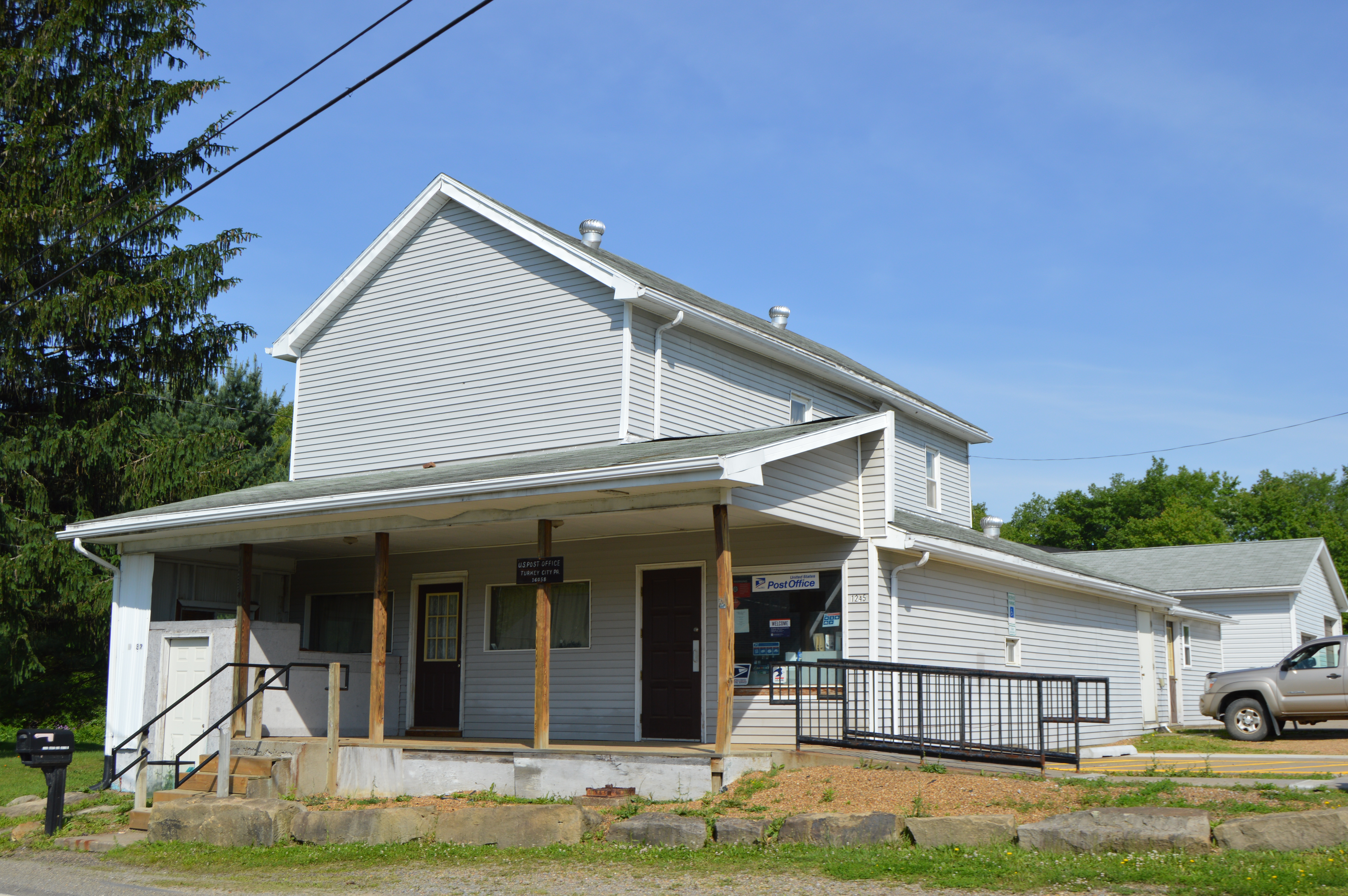
- Community post office

- Location within Pennsylvania
- Coordinates: 41°11′07″N 79°36′48″W
- Country: United States
- State: Pennsylvania
- County: Clarion
- Township: Richland
- Elevation: 1,201 ft (366 m)
- Time zone: UTC-5 (Eastern (EST))
  - Summer (DST): UTC-4 (EDT)
- ZIP code: 16058
- Area code: 814
- GNIS feature ID: 1189932

Turkey City is an unincorporated community in Clarion County, Pennsylvania, United States.

== History ==
The Turkey City post office was established in 1880. Turkey City has been noted for its colorful place name.
