= Turnip Hole, Pennsylvania =

Unincorporated community in Pennsylvania, US

- Unincorporated community
- Location within the state of Pennsylvania Turnip Hole (the United States)
- Coordinates: 41°9′9″N 79°35′21″W
- Country: United States
- State: Pennsylvania
- County: Clarion
- Township: Licking
- Elevation: 1,158 ft (353 m)
- Time zone: UTC-5 (Eastern (EST))
  - Summer (DST): UTC-4 (EDT)
- GNIS feature ID: 1189966

Turnip Hole is an unincorporated community in Clarion County, Pennsylvania, United States.

A post office called Turnip Hole was established in 1889, and remained in operation until it was discontinued in 1911. Turnip Hole has been noted for its colorful place name.
