= Todd, Pennsylvania =

- Unincorporated community
- Location within Pennsylvania
- Coordinates: 40°15′36″N 78°04′35″W
- Country: United States
- State: Pennsylvania
- County: Huntingdon
- Elevation: 1,138 ft (347 m)
- Time zone: UTC-5 (Eastern (EST))
  - Summer (DST): UTC-4 (EDT)
- ZIP code: 16685
- Area code: 814
- GNIS feature ID: 1189617

Todd is an unincorporated community in Huntingdon County, Pennsylvania, United States. The community is 16 miles (26 km) south-southwest of Huntingdon. Todd had a post office until September 28, 2002; it still has its own ZIP code, 16685.
