= Trough Creek State Park =

State park in Huntingdon County, Pennsylvania

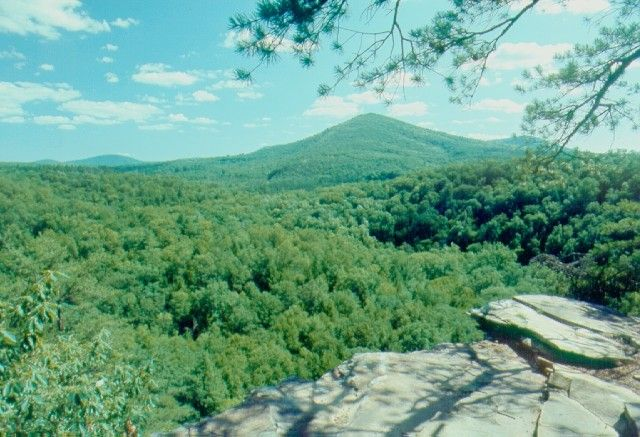

- Location within Pennsylvania Location within the United States
- Interactive map of Trough Creek State Park
- Location: Huntingdon County, Pennsylvania, United States
- Coordinates: 40°18′43″N 78°07′47″W
- Area: 541 acres (219 ha)
- Elevation: 1,073 feet (327 m)
- Established: 1936
- Administrator: Pennsylvania Department of Conservation and Natural Resources
- Website: Official website
- Pennsylvania State Parks

Trough Creek State Park is a 554 acres (224 ha) Pennsylvania state park in Cass, Penn and Todd Townships, Huntingdon County, Pennsylvania in the United States. The majority of the park is in Todd Township along Pennsylvania Route 994, east of the unincorporated village of Entriken. Huntingdon is the nearest borough. The park borders Rothrock State Forest and Raystown Lake National Recreation Area. There is a growing population of bald eagles at the lake. Fourteen eagles were spotted in January 2007. This is up from two that were spotted in 1990, the first year that an eagle survey was taken. These three sections of state and federal owned property combine to provide hunting, hiking and fishing opportunities for the outdoorsman.

Trough Creek State Park was chosen by the Pennsylvania Department of Conservation and Natural Resources (DCNR) and its Bureau of Parks as one of "25 Must-See Pennsylvania State Parks".

== History ==
The history of Trough Creek State Park dates back to the pre-colonial Native American inhabitants who hunted and fished in the area prior to being forced out by colonial settlers who came to the area just after the American Revolutionary War. The first Europeans in the area cleared land for farming and built a gristmill to support the farms. Later settlers built iron furnaces clearing the old-growth forests to provide fuel for the furnaces. Edgar Allan Poe is rumored to have visited the area and found inspiration in the ravens that lived on the cliffs along Great Trough Creek just prior to writing his poem "The Raven".

=== Industrial era ===
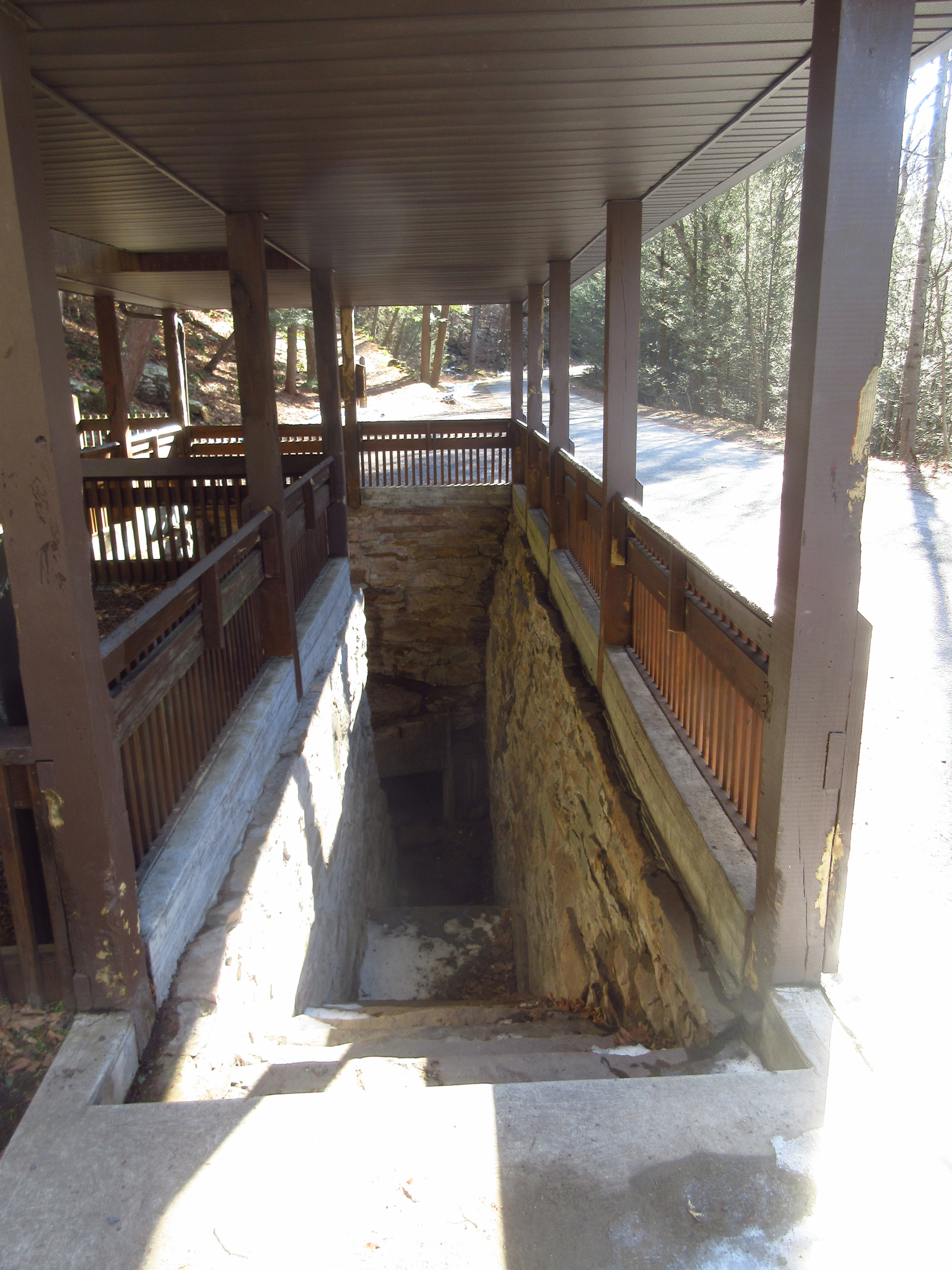
An ice mine in the park, which is believed to be the remains of an iron ore excavation operation, features a unique temperature inversion.

The area in and surrounding Trough Creek State Park was settled in 1780 by Nicholas Crum. Crum built a turbine-powered gristmill along Trough Creek. A bloomery was constructed in 1790. This iron furnace produced about 100 pounds (45 kg) of iron a day.

A larger furnace, Paradise Furnace, was constructed in 1827 by Rueben Trexler. Paradise Furnace greatly increased the production in the Great Trough Creek area. It rose from just 100 pounds (45 kg) a day to 12 short tons (11 t) a day. Savage Forge was built alongside Paradise Furnace in 1832. The forge turned cast iron into wrought iron. The community surrounding the iron industry thrived until the mid-1850s when Paradise Furnace closed. It reopened for a brief time during the American Civil War before shutting down permanently at the conclusion of the war. Paradise Furnace was listed on the National Register of Historic Places as a national historic district in 1990.

=== Lumber era ===
The lumber boom that swept through the hills and forests of Pennsylvania did not reach the Great Trough Creek area until 1910. At this time the area was a thriving second growth forest that had grown in place of the forests that were stripped during the industrial era. The mountains were stripped by the lumbering operation of Caprio and Grieco who had built a railroad into the area and built a sawmill at Paradise Furnace. The lumbermen took the logs to the sawmill where they were cut into lumber. Smaller logs were used to reinforce the mine shafts at the Broad Top Coal and Mineral Company mines in Jacobs, Pennsylvania. The only thing the lumbermen left behind was the treetops. These tree tops were left to dry. The passing steam locomotives on the railroads would ignite this dry brush causing massive wildfires that swept through the mountains and valleys. The Great Trough Creek area was left to waste. The forests struggled to regrow in the wake of the wildfire. The hills began to erode. The streams were dying and wildlife was scarcely found.

=== The forests come back ===
The area in and surrounding Trough Creek State Park no longer resembles the desolate wasteland left behind the ironmen and lumbermen. It is now a thriving third and fourth growth forest that is home to a wide variety of wildlife. The efforts of the men of the Works Progress Administration and Civilian Conservation Corps during the Great Depression helped to bring about the revitalization of the forests.

Under the direction of the National Park Service and the U.S. Army the men working for the WPA and CCC began the process of building what was to become Trough Creek State Park in June 1933 at CCC camp SP-57-PA. These men cleared the streams and forests tangled brush, they built bridges on state roads, cleared paths in the forests, planted trees and built many of the facilities used today at Trough Creek State Park which was formally opened in 1936.

== Geology ==
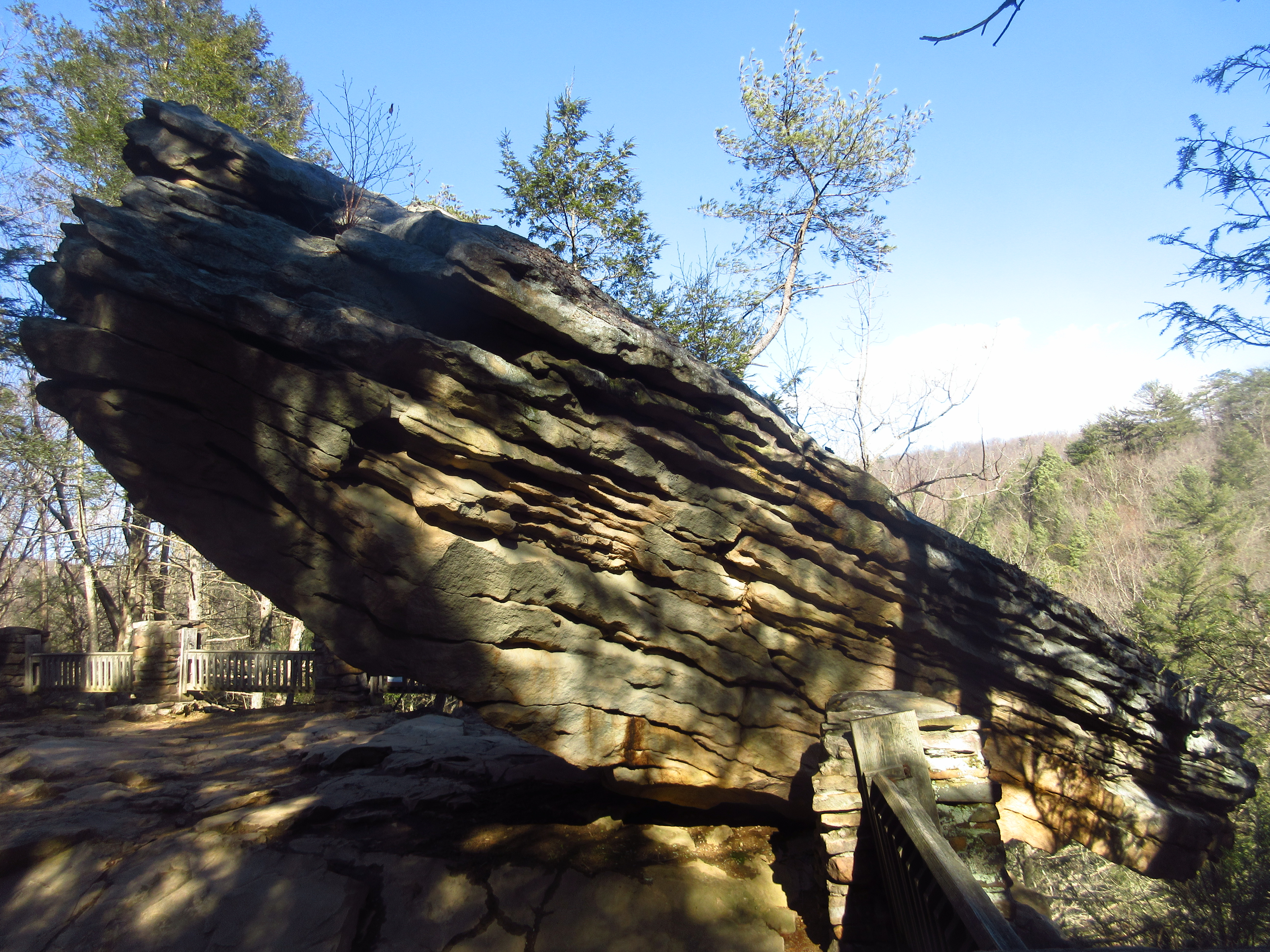
Balanced Rock appears to be perched precariously at the edge of a cliff.

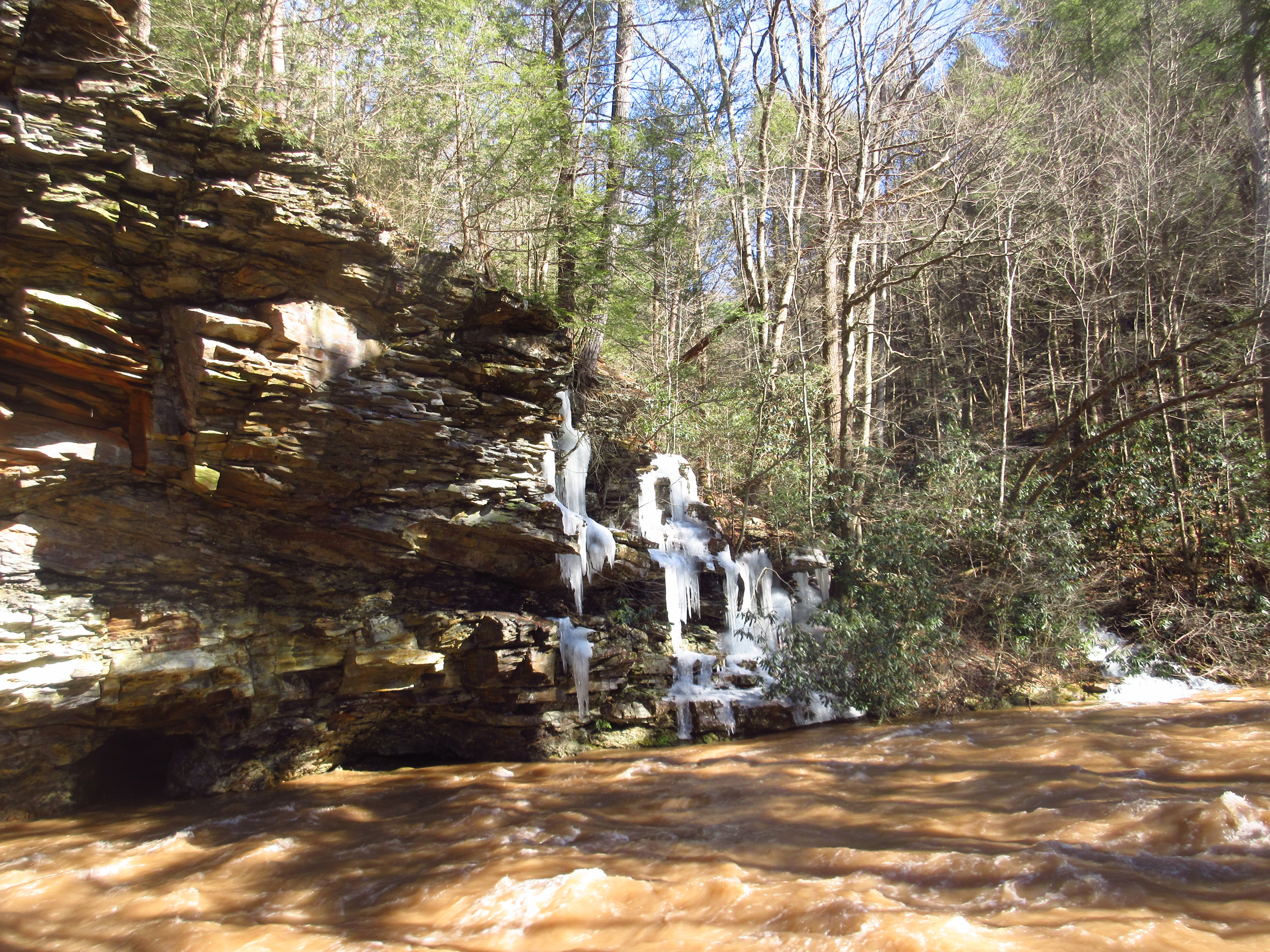
The eponymous Trough Creek is lined with copper-colored cliffs.

Trough Creek State Park is in the southern section of the Ridge and Valley region of Pennsylvania. Great Trough Creek carved a valley through the Broad Top in the Appalachian Mountains, which have been greatly reduced in size by the effects of wind and water erosion. The bedrock formations within the park are (in ascending stratigraphic order): Devonian Catskill Formation, the Mississippian-Devonian Rockwell Formation, and the Mississippian Pocono Formation.

Balanced Rock and Copperas Rocks are two examples of the effects of erosion that can be seen by visitors to Trough Creek State Park. Balanced Rock is perched atop a cliff alongside Great Trough Creek. It appears as if it could tumble into the creek below with the slightest push, but it has held the same position for thousands of years. Balanced Rock is made up of a hard type of rock that did not erode like the rock surrounding it. As the mountains eroded away Balanced Rock remained.

Copperas Rock has been stained a coppery-yellow color by ferrous sulfate that has leached from a small coal deposit. Ferrous sulfate is a leading cause of stream pollution in the streams of Pennsylvania, but the small amounts found in the Copperas Rock area are not enough to cause a significant problem in Great Trough Creek. A small cave found near Copperas Rock is thought to have been carved out by early settlers who used the ferrous sulfate mordant to set dyes to homespun fabrics.

Ice Mine is a mine shaft that may have been dug by prospectors looking for iron ore. Iron ore was not discovered but the prospectors did create a natural refrigerator. This has been formed in the shaft by the freezing and thawing of the rocks, melting snows and humid summer air. The rocks freeze in winter, contracting and allowing air to fill the empty spaces. Melting snow flows into the cave and is refrozen as ice. The ice remains thanks to cool air flowing down the mountainside and humid air rising up the mountain into the shaft. This process keeps the mine shaft icy until late summer.

== Recreation ==
Trough Creek State Park is open to year-round recreation, including camping, picnicking, hunting and fishing.

=== Lodging and picnicking ===
Trough Creek State Park has 29 rustic camp-sites, all equipped with a hook-up to electricity. RV's of any size can use the facilities at Trough Creek. Each campsite also has a picnic table, tent pad and campfire ring. There is a public restroom, but there are no showers.

Trough Creek Lodge is available to be rented at any time of the year. The lodge was built in the mid-19th century and is constructed of stone that has been covered with stucco that has been altered to look like bricks. The lodge has a modern kitchen, four bedrooms, two bathrooms and central heating.

There are five picnic sites in Trough Creek Lodge. Picnic tables and pavilions are available at all the picnic areas. There are restrooms, play areas, and hand pump wells available at some of the picnic areas.

=== Hunting and fishing ===
Only 100 acres (40 ha) of the park are open to hunting. But Trough Creek State Park adjoins state forest land and land owned by the U.S. Army Corps of Engineers. This land is open for hunting. The most common game species are ruffed grouse, squirrels, turkey and white-tailed deer. Hunters are expected to follow all rules and regulations of the Pennsylvania Game Commission.

Fishing is quite popular at Trough Creek State Park. Stream fishing is available in Great Trough Creek. Lake fishing is available in a cove of Raystown Lake that is within the park boundaries. Great Trough Creek holds a variety of fish including, trout, panfish, rock bass, sucker and smallmouth bass. Shad can be caught during their run at the mouths of the streams that feed into Raystown Lake.
