= York Township, Pennsylvania =

Township in Pennsylvania, US

Coordinates: 39°52′29″N 76°37′28″W

- Township
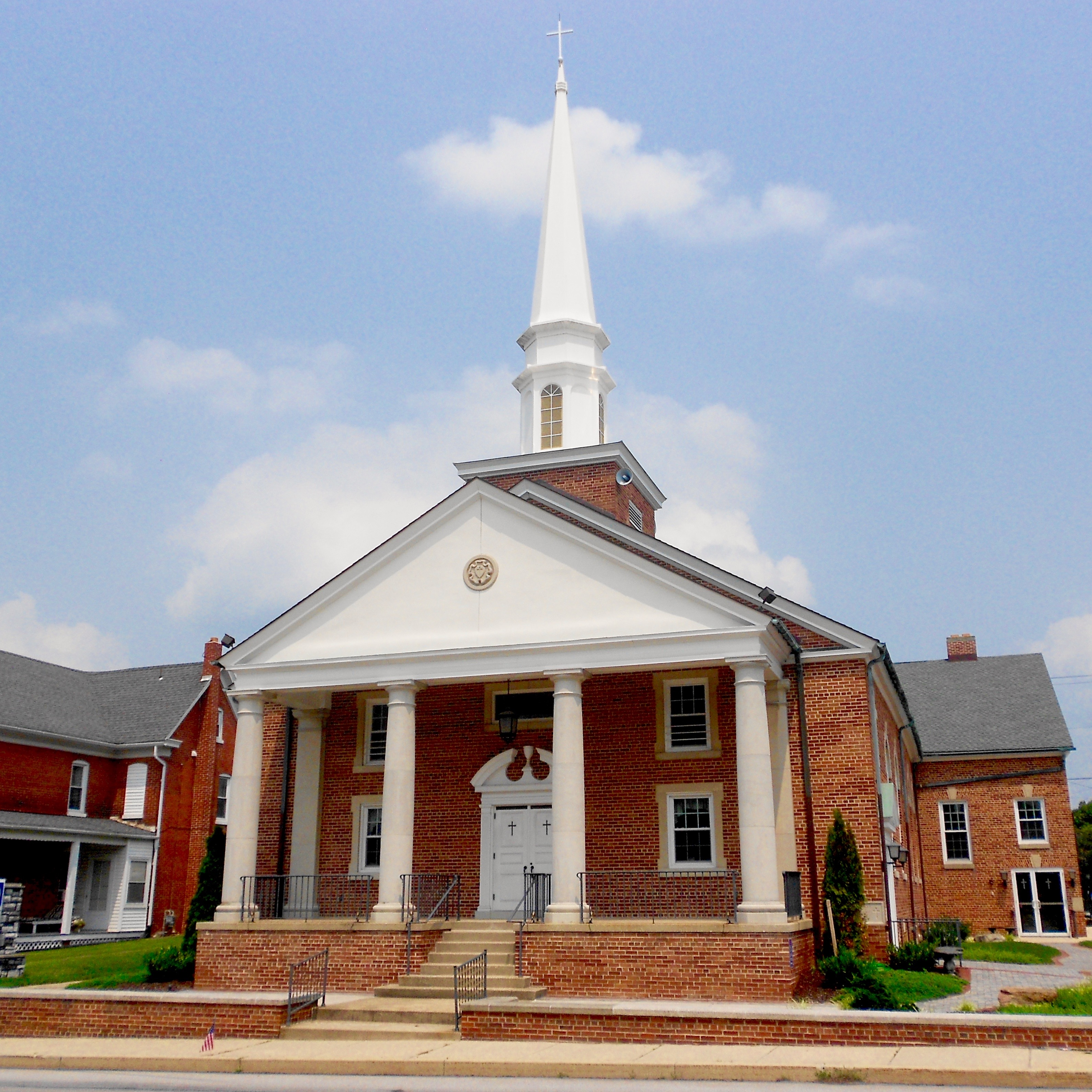
- Christ Lutheran Church in Spry

- Location in York County and the state of Pennsylvania.
- Country: United States
- State: Pennsylvania
- County: York
- Settled: 1748
- Incorporated: 1753

Government
  - Type: Board of Supervisors

Area
  - Total: 25.66 sq mi (66.45 km^{2})
  - Land: 25.25 sq mi (65.41 km^{2})
  - Water: 0.40 sq mi (1.04 km^{2})

Population (2020)
  - Total: 29,740 ▲
  - Estimate (2023): 30,485
  - Density: 1,127.3/sq mi (435.25/km^{2})
- Time zone: UTC-5 (Eastern (EST))
  - Summer (DST): UTC-4 (EDT)
- Area code: 717
- FIPS code: 42-133-87056
- Website: York Township official website

Historical population
Census	Pop.	Note	%±
1850	1,960		—
1860	2,395		22.2%
1870	2,594		8.3%
1880	2,379		−8.3%
1890	2,489		4.6%
1900	2,793		12.2%
1910	2,773		−0.7%
1920	2,881		3.9%
1930	3,239		12.4%
1940	3,590		10.8%
1950	4,502		25.4%
1960	8,506		88.9%
1970	12,702		49.3%
1980	16,893		33.0%
1990	19,231		13.8%
2000	23,637		22.9%
2010	27,793		17.6%
2020	29,740		7.0%
2023 (est.)	30,485		2.5%
U.S. Decennial Census

York Township is a township in York County, Pennsylvania, United States. The township is a suburb of The City of York. The population was 29,740 at the 2020 census.

== History ==
York Township was formed in 1753, when very few settlers lived in the area. Most of these lived in the southeastern section, most of which subsequently seceded into the boroughs of Dallastown, Red Lion and Yoe. The township remained mostly rural until after World War II. Today, York Township is still partially rural, but is predominantly suburban in character as the most populous suburb of York.

== Geography ==
According to the U.S. Census Bureau, the township has a total area of 25.8 square miles (67 km^{2}), of which 25.5 square miles (66 km^{2}) is land and 0.3 square miles (0.78 km^{2}), or 1.24%, is water. It contains the census-designated places of Queens Gate, Spry, and Tyler Run.

== Demographics ==
At the 2000 census there were 23,637 people, 9,857 households, and 6,604 families living in the township. The population density was 928.0 inhabitants per square mile (358.3/km^{2}). There were 10,258 housing units at an average density of 402.7 per square mile (155.5/km^{2}). The racial makeup of the township was 95.95% White, 1.52% African American, 0.14% Native American, 1.24% Asian, 0.03% Pacific Islander, 0.36% from other races, and 0.76% from two or more races. Hispanic or Latino of any race were 1.43%.

Of the 9,857 households 27.7% had children under the age of 18 living with them, 57.9% were married couples living together, 6.5% had a female householder with no husband present, and 33.0% were non-families. 27.3% of households were one person and 11.5% were one person aged 65 or older. The average household size was 2.34 and the average family size was 2.85.

The age distribution was 21.6% under the age of 18, 7.5% from 18 to 24, 27.7% from 25 to 44, 25.0% from 45 to 64, and 18.2% 65 or older. The median age was 41 years. For every 100 females, there were 92.8 males. For every 100 females age 18 and over, there were 89.6 males.

The median household income was $48,449 and the median family income was $57,177. Males had a median income of $40,207 versus $27,558 for females. The per capita income for the township was $25,169. About 3.7% of families and 5.0% of the population were below the poverty line, including 4.7% of those under age 18 and 6.7% of those age 65 or over.
