= Tiona, Pennsylvania =

Unincorporated community in Pennsylvania, U.S.

Coordinates: 41°44′49″N 79°04′02″W

Tiona is an unincorporated community in Mead Township, Warren County, Pennsylvania, United States. It is located just off Minister Creek and U.S. Route 6 at an elevation of 1,362 feet (415 m). Tiona is about halfway between the larger towns of Clarendon and Sheffield.

Being within Pennsylvania's oil country, Tiona was the 1882 birthplace of Norris Rods, a sucker rod manufacturing company founded by W.C. Norris.
