= Tylersville, Pennsylvania =

Unincorporated community in Pennsylvania, US

- Unincorporated community
- Location within Pennsylvania
- Coordinates: 40°59′26″N 77°25′30″W
- Country: United States
- State: Pennsylvania
- County: Clinton
- Elevation: 1,188 ft (362 m)
- Time zone: UTC-5 (Eastern (EST))
  - Summer (DST): UTC-4 (EDT)
- Area codes: 272 & 570
- GNIS feature ID: 1190051

Tylersville is an unincorporated community in Logan Township, Clinton County, Pennsylvania, United States. The community is located along Pennsylvania Route 880, 6.9 miles (11.1 km) west-southwest of Loganton. Tylersville had a post office until January 9, 2010.
