= Todd Township, Huntingdon County, Pennsylvania =

Township in Pennsylvania, US

Coordinates: 40°14′45″N 78°07′59″W

- Township
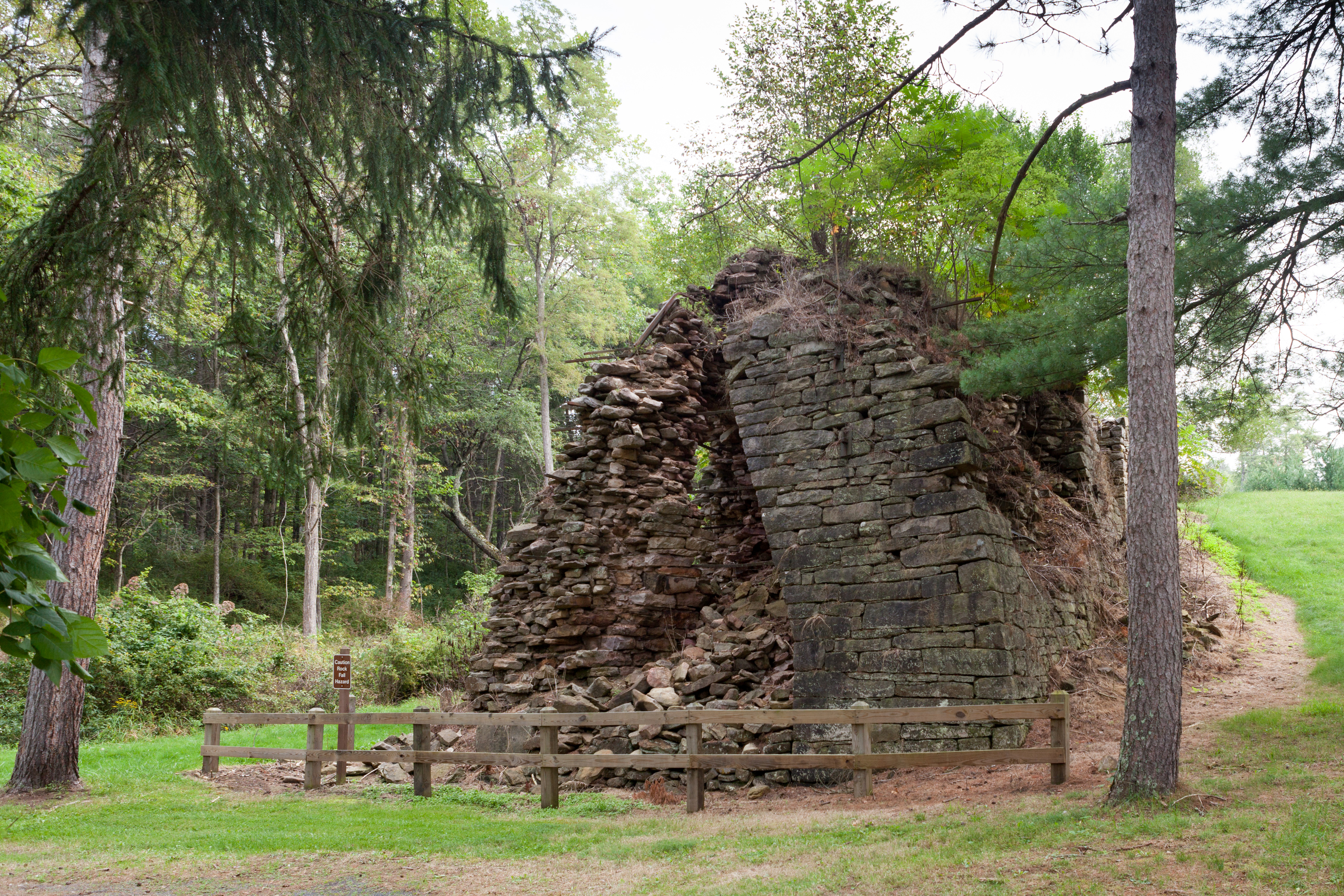
- Paradise Furnace

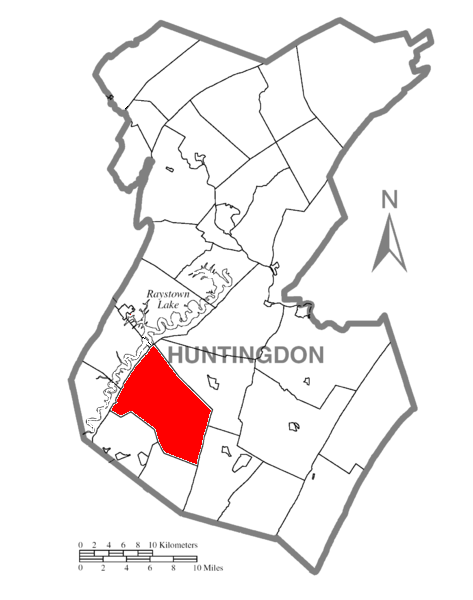
- Map of Huntingdon County, Pennsylvania Highlighting Todd Township

- Map of Huntingdon County, Pennsylvania
- Country: United States
- State: Pennsylvania
- County: Huntingdon

Area
  - Total: 44.45 sq mi (115.12 km^{2})
  - Land: 44.43 sq mi (115.07 km^{2})
  - Water: 0.019 sq mi (0.05 km^{2})

Population (2020)
  - Total: 895 ▼
  - Estimate (2022): 891
  - Density: 21/sq mi (8.2/km^{2})
- Time zone: UTC-5 (Eastern (EST))
  - Summer (DST): UTC-4 (EDT)
- Area code: 814
- FIPS code: 42-061-77000
- Website: https://toddtwphuntingdon.com/

Todd Township is a township that is located in Huntingdon County, Pennsylvania, United States. The population was 895 at the time of the 2020 census.

== History ==
The Baker Bridge and Paradise Furnace are listed on the National Register of Historic Places.

== Geography ==
According to the United States Census Bureau, the township has a total area of 44.8 square miles (116.0 km^{2}), of which 44.8 square miles (116.0 km^{2}) is land and 0.02% is water.

== Demographics ==
Historical population
Census	Pop.	Note	%±
2000	1,004		—
2010	952		−5.2%
2020	895		−6.0%
2022 (est.)	891		−0.4%
U.S. Decennial Census

As of the census of 2000, there were 1,004 people, 343 households, and 270 families residing in the township.

The population density was 22.4 people per square mile (8.7/km^{2}). There were 572 housing units at an average density of 12.8/sq mi (4.9/km^{2}).

The racial makeup of the township was 98.01% White, 1.39% African American, 0.10% Native American, and 0.50% from two or more races. Hispanic or Latino of any race were 1.99% of the population.

There were 343 households, out of which 37.0% had children under the age of eighteen living with them, 65.9% were married couples living together, 9.6% had a female householder with no husband present, and 21.0% were non-families. 18.4% of all households were made up of individuals, and 10.5% had someone living alone who was sixty-five years of age or older.

The average household size was 2.73 and the average family size was 3.08.

Within the township, the population was spread out, with 31.5% under the age of 18, 8.1% from 18 to 24, 26.5% from 25 to 44, 21.3% from 45 to 64, and 12.6% who were 65 years of age or older. The median age was 34 years.

For every 100 females there were 120.2 males. For every 100 females age 18 and over, there were 103.6 males.

The median income for a household in the township was $32,273, and the median income for a family was $37,344.

Males had a median income of $28,462 compared with that of $20,000 for females.

The per capita income for the township was $13,734.

Approximately 7.1% of families and 10.4% of the population were living below the poverty line, including 7.9% of those who were under the age of eighteen and 14.9% of those who were aged sixty-five or older.
