= 1916 United States Senate election in Washington =

- November 7, 1916
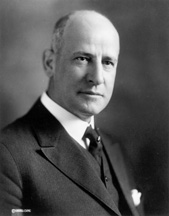

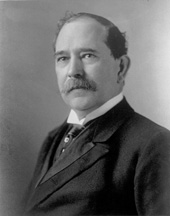

Nominee	Miles Poindexter	George Turner	Bruce Rogers
Party	Republican	Democratic	Socialist
Popular vote	202,287	135,339	21,709
Percentage	55.39%	37.06%	5.95%
- County results Poindexter: 40–50% 50–60% 60–70% Turner: 40–50% 50–60%
U.S. senator before election
Miles Poindexter
Republican
Elected U.S. Senator
Miles Poindexter
Republican

The 1916 United States Senate election in Washington was held on November 7, 1916. Incumbent Republican Miles Poindexter was running for a second term in office over Democratic former Senator George Turner and Socialist Bruce Rogers.

Primary elections were held on September 12. Poindexter overcame a strong primary challenge from U.S. Representative William E. Humphrey and college president Enoch Albert Bryan.

== Republican primary ==
=== Candidates ===
- Mrs. John B. Allen, widow of the late Senator John B. Allen
- Enoch Albert Bryan, president of Washington State College
- Schuyler Duryee
- William E. Humphrey, U.S. Representative from Seattle
- Miles Poindexter, incumbent U.S. Senator since 1911
- William Alvin Spalding

=== Results ===
1916 Republican Senate primary
Party	Candidate	Votes	%
Republican	Miles Poindexter (incumbent)	106,778	28.94%
Republican	William E. Humphrey	95,694	25.93%
Republican	Enoch Albert Bryan	83,769	22.70%
Republican	Mrs. John B. Allen	38,421	10.41%
Republican	William Alvin Spalding	22,688	6.15%
Republican	Schuyler Duryee	21,659	5.87%
Total votes		369,009	100.00%

== Democratic primary ==
=== Candidates ===
- Robert Bridges, Commissioner of the Port of Seattle
- George Turner, former U.S. Senator (1897–1903)

=== Results ===
Results by county Turner: 50–60%; 60–70%; 70–80%; 80–90%; Bridges: 50–60%; Tie: 50%

1916 Democratic Senate primary
Party	Candidate	Votes	%
Democratic	George Turner	20,002	67.51%
Democratic	Robert Bridges	9,628	32.49%
Total votes		29,630	100.00%

== Progressive primary ==
=== Candidates ===
- Walter J. Thompson

=== Results ===
Thompson was unopposed for the Progressive nomination.

1916 Progressive Senate primary
Party	Candidate	Votes	%
Progressive	Walter J. Thompson	296	100.00%
Total votes		296	100.00%

== General election ==
=== Results ===
1916 U.S. Senate election in Washington
Party	Candidate	Votes	%
Republican	Miles Poindexter (incumbent)	202,287	55.39%
Democratic	George Turner	135,339	37.06%
Socialist	Bruce Rogers	21,709	5.95%
Prohibition	Joseph A. Campbell	4,411	1.21%
Progressive	Walter J. Thompson	1,442	0.40%
Total votes		294,469	100.00%
Republican hold			

== See also ==
- 1916 United States Senate elections
