= Ernest O. Holland =

American academic (1874–1950)

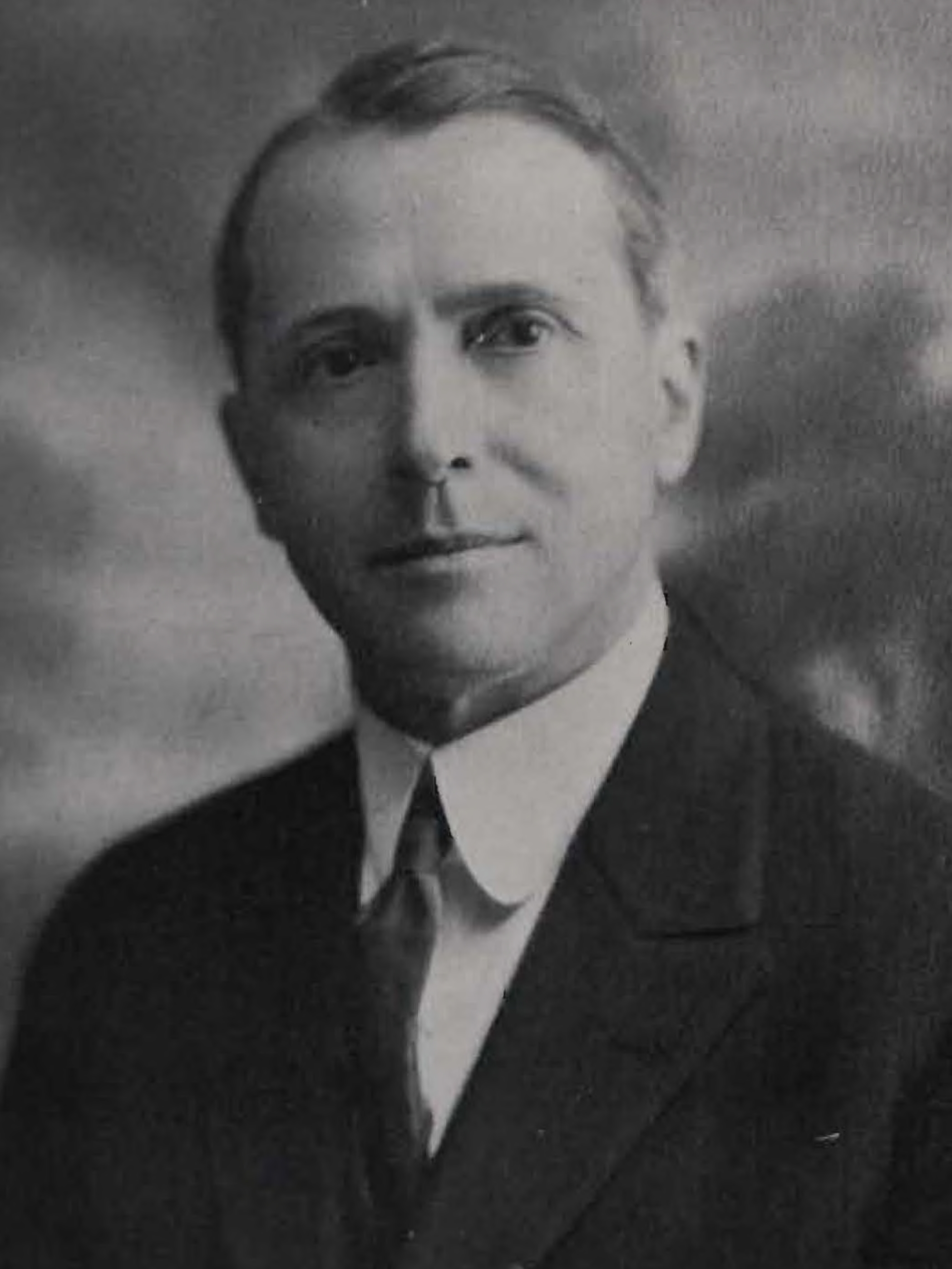
- Holland c. 1930

4th President of the State College of Washington
- In office 1915–1945
- Preceded by: Enoch Albert Bryan
- Succeeded by: Wilson Compton

Personal details
- Born: Ernest Otto Holland; February 4, 1874 Bennington, Indiana, U.S.
- Died: May 30, 1950 (aged 76)
- Education: Indiana University Bloomington (BA, PhD); Columbia University (PhD)
- Occupation: Academic

Ernest Otto Holland (February 4, 1874 – May 30, 1950) was an American academic, the superintendent of public schools for Louisville, Kentucky, and the fourth and longest-serving president of Washington State University, leading the institution from 1915 until 1945.

== Early life and education ==
Ernest Otto Holland was born February 4, 1874, in Bennington, Switzerland County, Indiana, the son of Philip Calphy Holland and Ann Atlanta Chittenden Holland. Philip and Ann had three sons and a daughter. In 1891, the Holland family moved from southeast Indiana to Bloomington, Indiana, where Philip practiced medicine.

Ernest attended rural and town schools as a young man, graduating in 1890 from high school in Vevay, the county seat of Switzerland County. He was a student at Indiana University during 1891–1895, and earned a B.A. degree in English from IU in 1895. He was a member of the Lambda chapter of Sigma Chi fraternity there and was elected to Phi Beta Kappa, the nation's oldest academic honor society. A Ph.D. would follow in 1912.

== Career ==
Holland began his career in education as an English teacher in high schools at Rensselaer in Jasper County, Indiana, and at Anderson in Madison County, Indiana, during the period 1895–1900. He then served as head of the English department at the boys' high school in Louisville, Kentucky, 1900–1905. He took additional studies during summer schools at Cornell University and the University of Chicago, 1898–1900. During 1905–1908, he was an associate professor of education at IU, then a professor of secondary education there from 1908 until 1911.

He pursued graduate study at Teachers' College, Columbia University, during 1908–1910. He earned his Ph.D. from Columbia in 1912, the year his dissertation, "The Pennsylvania state normal schools and public school system", was published.

In 1911, Holland became superintendent of schools at Louisville, Kentucky, a position he held until 1915 when the Board of Regents selected him to be the fourth president of the State College of Washington, now called Washington State University. He succeeded Enoch A. Bryan who retired.
