= Bryan Hall (Washington State University) =

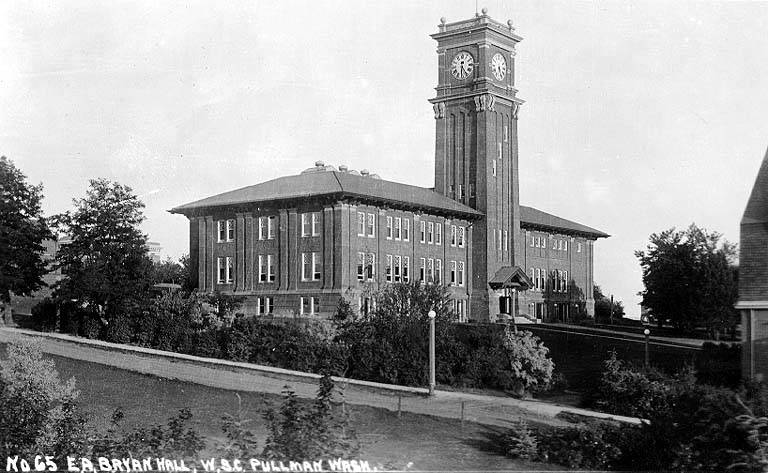
- View from northwest, circa 1921

- Location in the United States Location in Washington (state)

General information
- Architectural style: Classical Revival
- Location: 605 Veterans Way; Washington State University, Pullman, Washington, United States
- Coordinates: 46°43′53″N 117°9′54.5″W
- Elevation: 2,560 feet (780 m)
- Opened: 1909; 117 years ago
- Cost: $130,000
- Owner: Washington State University

Height
- Height: 113 feet (34 m)

Technical details
- Floor count: 3

Design and construction
- Architect: J. K. Dow

Bryan Hall is a prominent collegiate building on the campus of Washington State University in Pullman, Washington. Located in the historic campus core, it is named for Enoch A. Bryan (1855–1941), the president of the college from 1893 to 1915.

Easily distinguished by its clock tower, it is currently home to WSU’s Thomas Foley Institute, an auditorium and workshop used by the School of Music for musical theatre and opera productions, along with offices for the university's Global Learning and International Programs.

== History ==
Designed by Spokane architect J. K. Dow, Bryan Hall was originally used as the college library and gathering space; the building was dedicated in 1909. Its auditorium still serves its original function, though the library has since been repurposed after collections were moved following the completion of the Holland Library in 1950. The auditorium has played host to some notable speakers, including President William Howard Taft, Booker T. Washington, Helen Keller, and John F. Kennedy while on the campaign trail for president in early 1960.

== Features ==
=== Clock tower ===
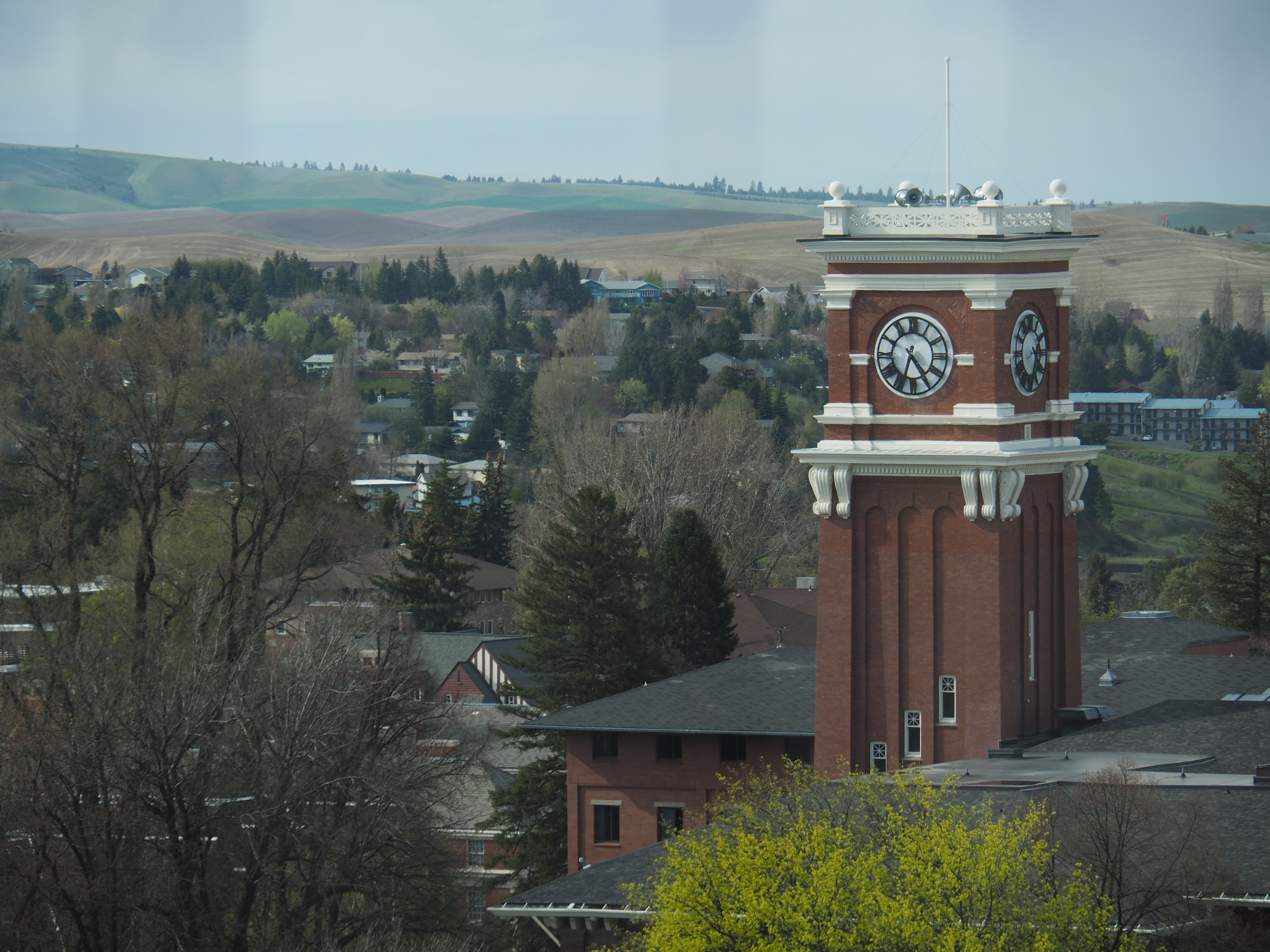
Bryan Hall clock tower, set against the rolling Palouse hills.

Bryan Hall did not feature any clockfaces until at least 1910. Crimson-colored neon lights were added to the clock in 1946, illuminating the faces with the glow of the school color. The original clockfaces were in continuous use from 1910-2010. In the summer of 2010 the wooden faces were replaced by steel faces which open into the building, permitting safer maintenance.

=== Theatre ===
Bryan Hall Theatre, a 778-seat vaudeville-style performance space, is currently under the jurisdiction of the WSU School of Music. The theater plays host to a range of musical performances, notably the WSU choirs, orchestra, Opera Company, symphony, wind ensemble, jazz bands, and many music festivals hosted by the school. The space has also been used for the annual State of the University Address, as it is the largest interior space on campus, apart from sporting venues. Though the theater was at one point used as a general university classroom, in 2008 the space was assigned to the School of Music and is no longer used for classes. In early 2019, Washington governor Jay Inslee gave a talk on global climate change in the auditorium.

=== Schantz Pipe Organ ===
Bryan Hall Theatre is home to a 44 rank Schantz pipe organ, installed in 1976. The organ features an electro-pneumatic action with three manuals. The manuals have a compass of 61 notes and the pedal 32 notes, arranged in a concave radiating pattern. The console features combination action thumb pistons and toe studs, in addition to a reversible full organ button and toe stud. The pipes are arranged loosely in the style of the Holtkamp organ at Syracuse University. It has a wide variety of solo stops available in the swell division.

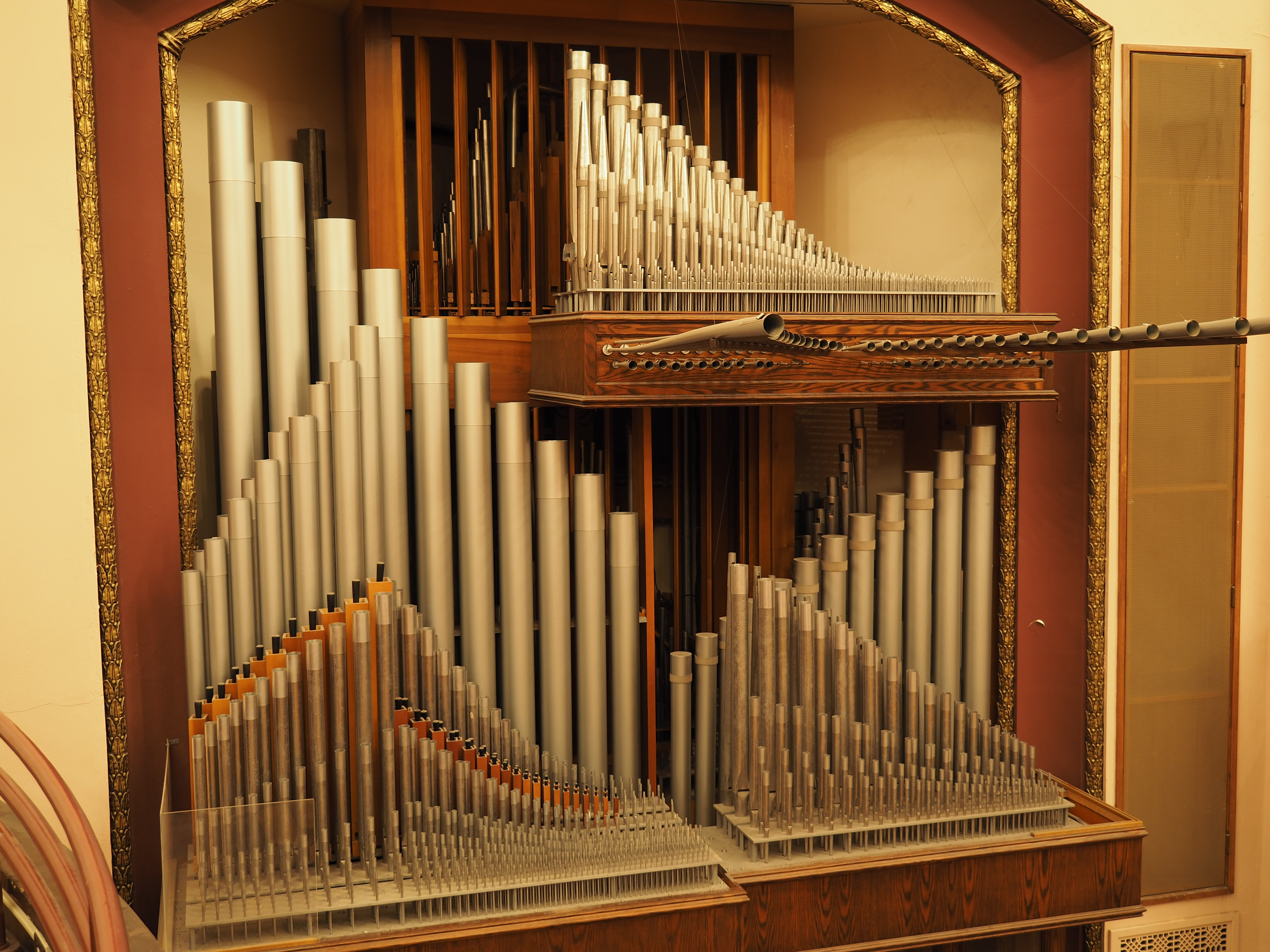
The 44-rank Schantz organ of Bryan Hall.

Disposition
Swell	Great	Positive	Pedal
16' Bourdon 8' Bourdon 8' Viole de Gambe 8' Viole Celeste 4' Spitzprincipal 4' Flute Harmonique 2 2/3' Nasard 2' Quarte de Nasard 1 3/5' Tierce IV Plein Jeu 16' Contre-Hautbois 8' Trompette 8' Hautbois 8' Voix Humaine 4' Clairon Tremulant	16' Pommer 8' Principal 8' Holzgedackt 4' Octave 4' Rohrflöte 2' Super Octave IV Fourniture 8' Trompette-en-Chamade	8' Singengedackt 4' Principal 4' Spillflöte 2' Italian Principal 1 1/3' Larigot III Cymbal 8' Krummhorn 8' Trompette-en-Chamade Tremulant	32' Resultant 16' Principal 16' Violone 16' Pommer 16' Bourdon 8' Octave 8' Pommer 8' Bourdon 4' Choralbass 4' Spitzflöte 2' Spitzflöte III Mixture 16' Bombarde 16' Contre-Hautbois 8' Bombarde 8' Hautbois 4' Hautbois-Clairon 8' Trompette-en-Chamade

=== Carillon ===
Bryan Hall is equipped with a Maas-Rowe digital carillon which has traditionally chimed the hour in addition to sounding evening concerts by university staff and students. The carillon features an octave and a half keyboard. The keyboard strikes metal rods; the vibrations caused by these rods are amplified before being projected by speakers on top of the tower, emulating the sound of physical bells. The original speakers used for this purpose upon the installation of the bells in 1948 were unused surplus aircraft carrier speakers. Longtime carillonneur Elizabeth Gabe arranged music for the chimes during her tenure as the only regular player. Many of these are still preserved in the carillon room. In 2011, after 40 years at the carillon she passed on the torch to Carol Rydbom. Interested students have also had the chance to play the carillon, adding to the school spirit and collegiate atmosphere. In the summer of 2019, the carillon returned to regular use, after lying dormant for some time due to a malfunction.

=== Classroom spaces ===
As of 2019, Bryan Hall is home to four general university classrooms, including an Active Learning Classroom equipped with a fully customizable classroom layout. The largest classroom seats 128 students and features a piano. The Active Learning Classroom can fit 54 students and is designed in a “pod” format, with students sitting around tables.

== Campus iconography ==
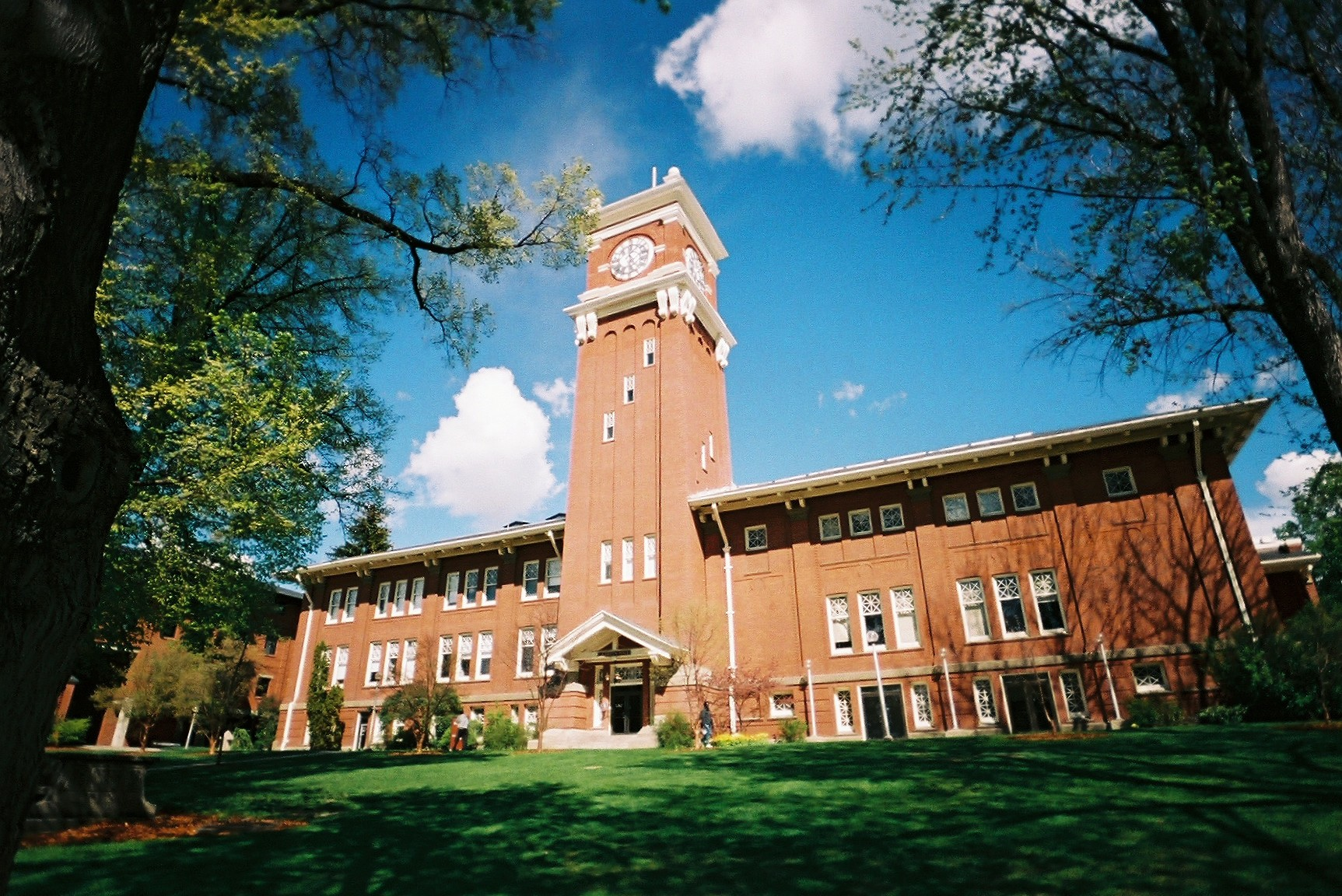
View from west in May 2007

The Bryan Hall clock tower is a prominent landmark of Washington State University and is used frequently in iconography for both the university and the surrounding area. Silhouettes of the clock tower are featured in the logos for the WSU Student Entertainment Board (SEB), the Allegro Student Association for Music Advocacy, and the City of Pullman. Tours of campus encourage prospective tours to use the tower as a grounding point when first getting to know campus. That it lights up with crimson lights at night helps students find their way around.

== In campus culture ==
Popular university lore claims that Bryan Hall is haunted by the ghost of Enoch A. Bryan, for whom it is named. Several accounts of organ music with no organist, the former president’s rocking chair moving on its own, and the sensation of a sudden cold and damp feeling have been recorded independently by students and faculty. The stories primarily were recorded in the 60s and 70s, when the theatre department also used to take part in the management of the auditorium. Some claim that the events stopped occurring after the drama program was moved to Daggy Hall.
