= Volunteers (1985 film) =

1985 film by Nicholas Meyer

- Theatrical release poster
- Directed by: Nicholas Meyer
- Written by: Keith F. Critchlow; David Isaacs; Ken Levine
- Produced by: Walter F. Parkes; Richard Shepherd
- Starring: Tom Hanks; Rita Wilson; Tim Thomerson; John Candy
- Cinematography: Ric Waite
- Edited by: Ronald Roose
- Music by: James Horner
- Production companies: HBO Pictures; Silver Screen Partners
- Distributed by: Tri-Star Pictures
- Release date: August 16, 1985
- Running time: 107 minutes
- Country: United States
- Language: English
- Budget: $10 million
- Box office: $19.8 million

Volunteers is a 1985 American comedy film directed by Nicholas Meyer and starring Tom Hanks, John Candy, and Rita Wilson.

== Plot ==
Lawrence Bourne III is a spoiled kid who just graduated from Yale, Class of 1962, with a $28,000 gambling debt. When his father, Lawrence Bourne Jr., refuses to pay his son’s debt, involving the 1962 NBA Finals the son escapes his angry creditors by trading places with his college roommate Kent, on a Peace Corps flight to Thailand. On the plane, he meets Washington State graduate Tom Tuttle from Tacoma, and the beautiful, down-to-earth Beth Wexler, the latter rejecting his advances once realizing why he is really there.

In Thailand, they are assigned by John Reynolds to build a bridge for the local villagers. On day one, Tuttle gets into an argument with the villagers over what wood to use; the only native who speaks English is At Toon.

Tuttle gets captured by communist forces who brainwash him to doing their bidding, while Reynolds makes passes at Beth. Lawrence befriends At Toon, teaching him and several other villagers various gambling card games, but they are met by the powerful drug lord Chung Mee, who forces them to finish the bridge quickly.

Lawrence eventually wins over Beth, but she is captured by Reynolds, who is revealed to be working with Chung Mee. They rescue Beth, who urges them to destroy the bridge; Lawrence reluctantly agrees after professing his love for her. They get the villagers on board with the plan and get Tuttle back to reality, plotting to leave dynamite in the center of the bridge so that the entire structure collapses. Their plan works fine until Lawrence is confronted by Reynolds, who threatens to kill him. Lawrence distracts Reynolds long enough to enact the plan, jumping into the river as the bridge explodes. Beth saves Lawrence by performing CPR, and they kiss once Lawrence wakes.

Some time later, Lawrence and Beth are married in the Thai village. Lawrence writes to his parents, saying he finally did something right for the right reasons, but he really has not. He has decided to open a casino and tells his parents he could use money.

== Cast ==
- Tom Hanks as Lawrence Bourne III
- John Candy as Tom Tuttle
- Rita Wilson as Beth Wexler
- Tim Thomerson as John Reynolds
- Gedde Watanabe as At Toon
- George Plimpton as Lawrence Bourne Jr.
- Ernest Harada as Chung Mee
- Allan Arbus as Albert Bardenaro
- Xander Berkeley as Kent Sutcliffe

== Production ==
The film was in the works for six years before it was made. Volunteers was filmed in Tuxtepec, Oaxaca, Mexico. The filmmakers built a Thai village based on the Karen people of Burma's Golden Triangle, building the world's longest wooden suspension bridge, which was more than 250 yd (230 m) long. A cast of more than 100 people from around the world, including Thai families, spent two and a half months filming.

Meyer states that the director of the Peace Corps, Sargent Shriver, read the script and complained that it "was like spitting on the American flag", and he demanded changes. The changes were never made, but by the time the film was released, Shriver was no longer director, and Peace Corps officials were willing to endorse the film.

This film marked the reunion of Hanks and Candy, who had starred in Splash. It is also the film in which Hanks reconnected with his future wife, Rita Wilson, whom he had met when they worked on an episode of Bosom Buddies.

The scene in which Wilson and Hanks enjoy Coca-Cola was criticized as product placement, as TriStar was a unit of Columbia Pictures, then owned by The Coca-Cola Company. Cowriter Levine denies this, stating that the scene appeared in the first draft of the film written in 1980, when Metro-Goldwyn-Mayer was to be the studio.

The film spoofs a number of David Lean epics, including Lawrence of Arabia and The Bridge on the River Kwai, with the Washington State University Fight Song used in place of the "Colonel Bogey March".

== Reception ==
=== Box office ===
The film debuted at number 2 at the box office, earning $5,184,360 during its opening weekend. It ultimately grossed a domestic total of $19,875,740.

=== Critical response ===
Volunteers received generally mixed reviews from critics. The film holds a 58% score on the review aggregator, Rotten Tomatoes.

Walter Goodman of The New York Times praised the "steady directorial hand" of Nicholas Meyer and the "stylishly droll performance" of Tom Hanks, about whom Goodman added, "He is a center of confidence amid the frantic goings-on, turning peril into opportunity with an accent and aplomb that are the birthright of an eighth-generation Bourne."

Conversely, Variety called it "a very broad and mostly flat comedy", and wrote, "Toplined Tom Hanks gets in a few good zingers as an upperclass snob doing time in Thailand, but promising premise and opening shortly descend into unduly protracted tedium."

== See also ==
- List of American films of 1985
