= The Fight Song (Washington State University) =

Song
- Published: 1919
- Genre: Fight song
- Composer: Phyllis Sayles
- Lyricist: Zella Melcher

"The Fight Song" is the fight song of the Washington State University (WSU) in Pullman, Washington. The music to the tune was composed in 1919 by WSU student Phyllis Sayles with fellow student Zella Melcher penning the lyrics. Sayles, who had transferred to WSU from Northwestern University two years before composing "The Fight Song", is also responsible for arranging the 1917 edition of the Northwestern University Songbook.

A non-scientific, 1997 survey undertaken by the Spokesman-Review found few students, employees, and supporters of WSU knew the lyrics to the song, noting that "when it comes to the acid test of Cougar spirit – the ability to sing the fight song on a moment's notice – almost everyone flunks." Nonetheless, the 1985 film Volunteers features a lyrically correct rendition of "The Fight Song" by John Candy, whose character, Tommy Tuttle, is an alumnus of the university. In the plotline of that film, "The Fight Song" is subsequently adopted by a group of Thai communist partisans as a battle cry.

In 2013, new uniforms for the Washington State Cougars men's basketball team were debuted which featured the lyrics to "The Fight Song" on the backs of both home and away jerseys.

Some supporters of Washington State University's athletic teams have been known to construct banjos out of used tins of Cougar Gold (a cheddar cheese produced by the Washington State University Creamery) which they then use to perform "The Fight Song." These instruments are colloquially known as "canjos."
