= William Jasper Spillman =

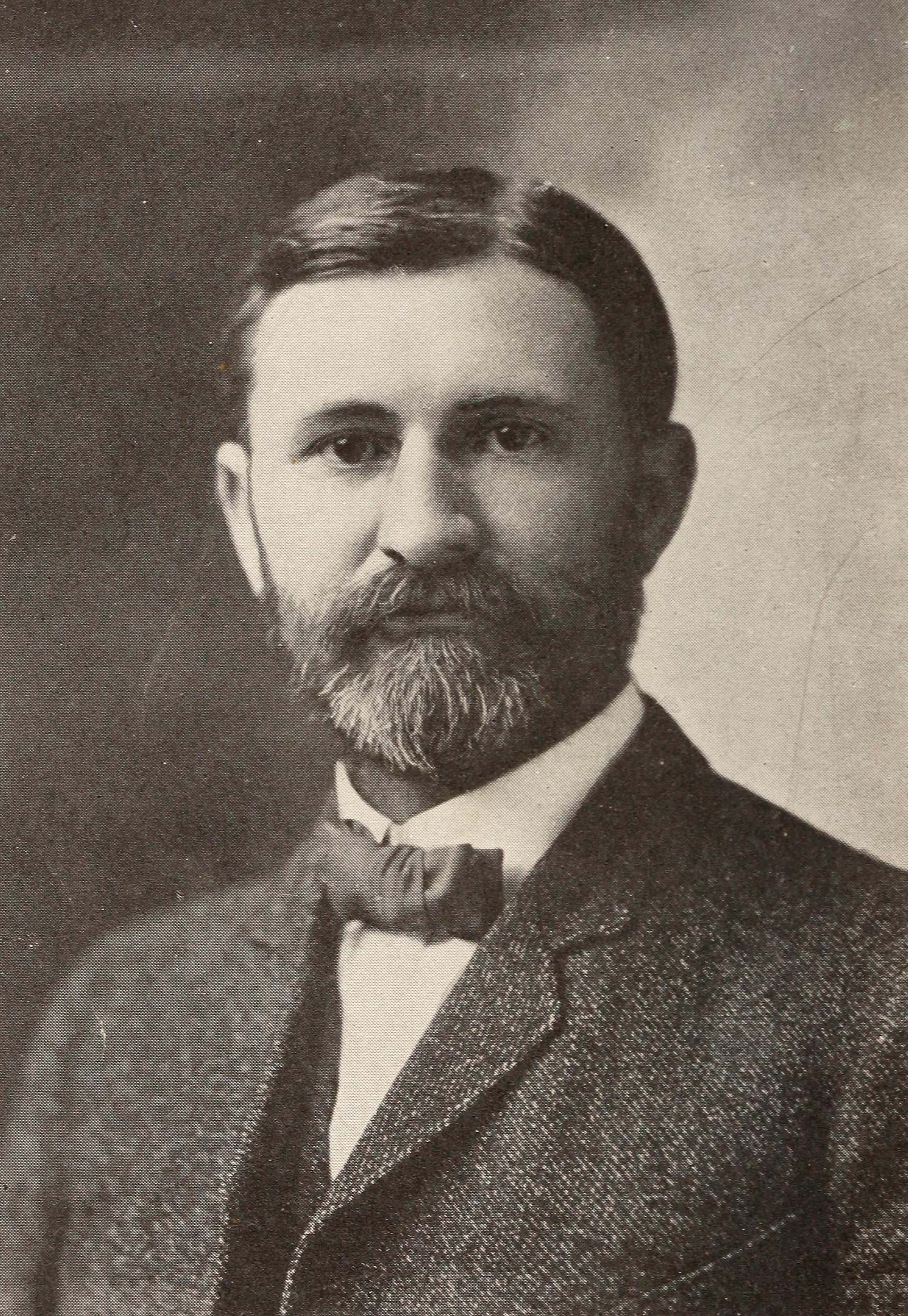

William Jasper Spillman (October 18, 1863 – July 11, 1931) is considered to be the founding father of agricultural economics. In addition, he is notable for being the only American to independently rediscover Mendel's laws of genetics.

== Early life and education ==
Spillman was born October 23, 1863, in Lawrence County, Missouri, the eleventh of fifteen children of Nathan Cosby Spilman (b. 1823) and Emily Paralee Pruit (b. 1830). His childhood was spent on their 200-acre (0.81 km^{2}) southwest Missouri farm among a large family burdened by the accidental death of his father on July 21, 1871.

In his mid-teens, he began teaching at a rural school near home. Then in 1881, young Willie Spilman (he changed the spelling while in college) enrolled at the University of Missouri. He subsequently received his B.S. in 1886. Following three years as a teacher at Missouri State Normal School, Cape Girardeau, where he married Miss Mattie Ramsay (1865–1935) in 1889, he received his M.S. in 1890 from the University of Missouri in absentia.

== Career ==
At this time, Spillman was teaching botany and physics at Vincennes University in Indiana where he was fortunate in making the acquaintance of Dr. Enoch A. Bryan who later, as president of Washington Agricultural College and School of Science, invited Spillman to join the faculty.

In 1889 the Spillmans moved to Oregon where he was appointed teacher of science at the Oregon State Normal School, today Western Oregon University, at Monmouth. One of the Spillman sisters and her husband were living in nearby McMinnville. Another older sister was living at The Dalles with her family. It was in Monmouth that Ramsay Spillman was born September 21, 1891.

The Spillmans remained in Monmouth until 1894, the year after E.A. Bryan became the third president of the newly opened Washington Agricultural College and School of Science, now Washington State University, in Pullman. Bryan invited his former colleague to teach agriculture. His preparation for this new assignment consisted of his farm childhood, his scientific training and several weeks of observation at the University of Wisconsin.

During his brief tenure at Washington's land-grant college, Spillman established the economically important wheat breeding program that continues to this day. He asked the farmers of the fertile Palouse region what they grew and what they needed, the latter being a winter wheat. He used genetics as well as research trials to develop the varieties of wheat necessary for growers to continue to farm. In addition, he began to concentrate on the economics and methodology of practical agriculture for the farmer. He became known as the man with the knowledge to assist the farmer, not just a laboratory theorist.

It was at Pullman that, involved in experiments to hybridize wheat adapted to the growing conditions of the Palouse country, Spillman independently rediscovered Mendel's Law of Heredity. He has been credited with a major role in the acceptance of Mendel's Law by scientists and agriculturalists. His discovery was published in a November 1901 paper titled "Quantitative Studies on the Transmission of Parental Characters to Hybrid Offspring".

In 1902 he accepted a position with the U.S. Department of Agriculture following the reception of his paper on his wheat-breeding experiments presented at the meeting of the Association of American Agricultural Colleges and Experiment Stations in Washington, D.C., in November, 1901. Here he, and a select crew which followed him from Pullman (as an earlier group had followed him from Monmouth), laid the groundwork for the scientific management of farms. Although hired as an agrostologist (or expert on grasses) Spillman's overwhelming interest in farm management coupled with the nearly free hand given to him by the department produced several bulletins, speeches and other communications directed to the farmer's needs.

In 1905 the Office of Farm Management was organized with Spillman as the head, a position he retained until 1918 when a disagreement with the Secretary of Agriculture elicited his resignation. Subsequently, he obtained a position as editor of the influential Farm Journal. This provided a forum for his many and diverse approaches to agriculture. He retained this position until the farm slump and a subsequent loss of advertising revenue in 1921 forced the Journal to cut back its staff.

Almost immediately, Spillman was asked to rejoin the Department of Agriculture and was again given a free hand. Among his many other activities, Spillman was asked to participate in the efforts of the 1927-1928 Survey of Indian Affairs. Spillman's role required visiting reservations across the country and reporting on their economic use and potential, particularly in relation to agriculture. The final report of the Survey was published as The Problem of Indian Administration (Baltimore: Johns Hopkins Press, 1928). He also served as part-time professor of commercial geography at the Foreign Service School of Georgetown University from 1922 until 1931. Spillman remained with the U.S.D.A. until his death in 1931.

== Recognition ==
At his University of Missouri commencement on June 3, 1886, when he earned a bachelor of science degree, Spillman gave the Valedictory Address of Academic Classes.

In 1910, Spillman's associates elected him as the first president of the American Farm Economic Association to recognize his contributions to farm management and agricultural economics.

Also in 1910, Spillman received an honorary doctorate from his alma mater, the University of Missouri.

The Agronomy Farm at Washington State University was established in 1955 and in 1961 was named for William Jasper Spillman, WSU's first wheat breeder. The 382-acre (1.55 km^{2}) farm five miles (8 km) southeast of Pullman continues to play an active role in WSU research. The farm's 50th anniversary was celebrated July 7, 2005, with a review at 100 years of crop breeding at WSU that started with Spillman.

== Personal ==
William Jasper Spillman's father Nathan Cosby Spilman was born on February 3, 1823, in Allen County, Kentucky, and came to Lawrence County, Missouri, in 1847. He died in 1871. W. J.'s mother, Emily Paralee Pruit Spilman, died in 1913. Both parents are buried in Boucher Cemetery, Lawrence County, Missouri.

His own wife, Mattie Lorena Ramsey was born April 22, 1865. They married May 20, 1889. Their only child was son Ramsay Spillman, who was born September 21, 1891, and died in 1968. William Jasper Spillman was working at the U.S.D.A. until his death on July 11, 1931, following an unsuccessful operation.
