= Elmina White Honors Hall =

Residence hall in Pullman, Washington, U.S.

Coordinates: 46°43′54″N 117°10′4.5″W

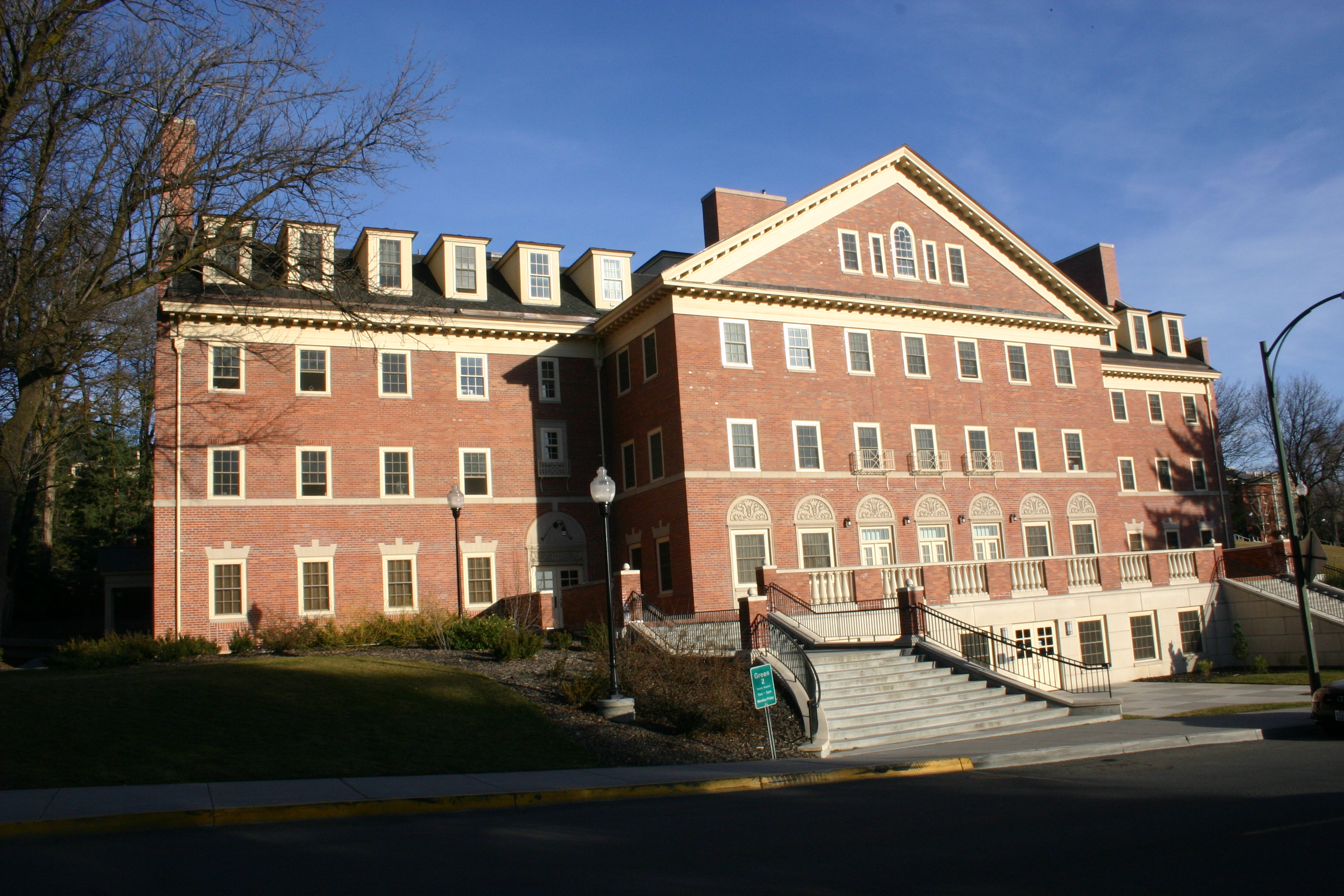
Elmina White Honors Hall (originally the Home Economics Building) in 2004

The Elmina White Honors Hall, also known as Honors Hall, is a residence hall located on the main campus of Washington State University in Pullman, Washington. It was designed by Stanley Smith, the head of the architecture department at Washington State University (1924-1947), and was completed in 1928. It was later remodeled into student housing and faculty offices in 2001, costing $15.3 million. It is located in the northwest corner of Washington State University (WSU) in Pullman, Washington. Its original purpose was to house the Home Economics department as part of the College of Domestic Economy. Following the 2001 reconstruction, the four-story building, with a converted basement, was transformed into three floors of residential suites with classrooms, offices, and a library for the WSU Honors College on the ground floor, and several multi-purpose rooms in the basement. It was designed in a Georgian Revival style and was referred to as an “elegant architectural statement” in a report provided by the Washington State University Task Force for Historic Preservation in 1985.

== Design ==
Elmina White Honors Hall is situated next to one of the university's most significant open spaces, near the original entrance arch to campus. Its Georgian Revival style features include its proportion and balance (mathematic ratios were utilized to determine the height and shape of the windows and other features), sturdy and uniform red brick walls, perfectly symmetrical stonework, and a dark shingled roof which contrasts with the bright red bricks of the walls. Its architecture resembles that of many historic buildings at American college campuses, such as Massachusetts Hall at Harvard University in Cambridge, Massachusetts.

Buildings with a similar style can be found throughout the university's campus in other buildings also designed by Stanley Smith, such as Wilmer-Davis Hall, Waller Hall, Duncan Dunn Hall, and Smith Gymnasium. This provides the campus aesthetic with a feeling of uniformity and order.

When Elmina White Honors Hall was remodeled in 2001 by Kovalenko Hale Architects (Seattle, WA), the original interior design of the building was mostly maintained with the refurbishment of the building materials. However, with the renovation, residential suites and several updated modern features such as a computer laboratory, mechanical and utility rooms, and classrooms with updated technology were added. The mission of the renovation was “to provide the Honors College with an identity that symbolizes the value the university places on academic achievement by providing a living and learning program in one complex, thereby stimulating artistic and scholarly expression.” These renovations provide a strong balance between being an updated and practical building and maintaining the history of the building along with its original aesthetic.

Elmina White Honors Hall also includes a few interesting features in its original design. A forced air ventilation system was included long prior to other campus buildings being constructed or refit with this equipment. In addition to this, it was built with a steel frame.

== Landscape ==
The Elmina White Honors hall is situated across NE Spokane street from the several WSU engineering buildings. To the south of the building, the university's largest open space is located. In addition, it has no other building within its near vicinity.

When the building was first constructed, the landscape was simple with a few small trees and bushes. Today the landscape around the building is rather simple and open, with lawns, evergreens, shrubbery, and small regions covered in woodchips with small, well-spaced plants. The openness of the surrounding landscape helps focus attention on the building, although it is situated at the bottom end of a hill. Its wide, curving staircases that narrow toward the entrances of the building are unique within campus architecture.

== Function ==
The original purpose of the Elmina White Honors Hall, then referred to as the Home Economics Building, was to provide classrooms and offices for the institution's Home Economics department and house the classrooms and offices for the College of Domestic Economy, which had previously been in Van Doren Hall. In the 1980s, WSU's College of Domestic Economy was broken up and blended in with other programs. At that time it was renamed to White Hall and converted into a multipurpose building with various offices and classrooms.

Not until 2001, following the renovation, was it converted to the multi-purpose function it has today. It is today best known to students as an on-campus, co-educational residence hall housing up to 117 students, with various amenities including a library, study rooms, student lounges, kitchens, and indoor bike storage. In also contains offices and classrooms for the Honors College.
