= Cougar Gold =

Canned Cheddar-style cheese made in Washington state

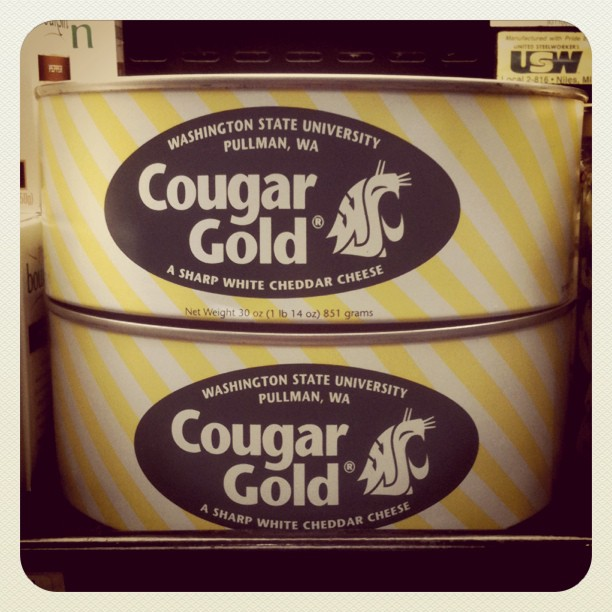
Cougar Gold Cheddar Cheese

Cougar Gold is an American cheddar cheese produced at the Washington State University Creamery on the Washington State University campus in Pullman, Washington. Like other cheeses sold at the creamery, Cougar Gold is notable for being sold exclusively in 30 oz (850 g) tin cans. Cougar Gold is a sharp white cheddar that is aged at least one year. It has a nutty flavor somewhat resembling Swiss or Gouda. When properly refrigerated, Cougar Gold is claimed to last indefinitely in the can. An unopened can becomes more flavorful, sharp, dry and crumbly with age. Approximately 250,000 cans of Cougar Cheese are produced annually, with around 80% of it being Cougar Gold.

The WSU Creamery produces eight different flavors of cheese as well as many ice cream flavors. Washington State University students are employed to produce the cheese and ice cream and to sell products in Ferdinand's Ice Cream Shoppe as well as in the Creamery's direct marketing department that ships cheese nationwide.

WSU started making cheese in cans in the 1940s when the US government and American Can Company funded WSU's research to find a way to successfully keep the cheese in tins. Cougar Gold was developed during this time and was named after Norman S. Golding, one of the men involved in its production.

In 1993, the American Cheese Society awarded Cougar Gold with a blue ribbon, and in 1995, the cheese earned the United States Cheese Champion silver medal. Cougar Gold later received a silver medal at the 2000 World Cheese Awards and a gold medal at the 2006 World Cheese Awards. The cheese has been featured in Bon Appétit magazine and on The Rachael Ray Show.
