= Washington State University =

Public university in Pullman, Washington, US

- Former names: Agricultural College, Experiment Station and School of Science of the State of Washington (1890–1905); State College of Washington (1905–1959)
- Type: Public land-grant research university
- Established: March 28, 1890; 136 years ago
- Accreditation: NWCCU
- Academic affiliations: COP; CUMU
- Endowment: $800.3 million (2025)
- Budget: $1.3 billion (FY2025)
- President: Elizabeth R. Cantwell
- Provost: T. Chris Riley-Tillman
- Academic staff: 2,261
- Students: 25,477 – (Total, Fall 2025); 16,248 – (Pullman); 1,218 – (Spokane); 1,609 – (Tri-Cities); 253 – (Everett); 2,694 – (Vancouver); 3,455 – (Global Campus/WSU Online)
- Undergraduates: 21,400 – (Total, Fall 2025); 14,178 – (Pullman); 412 – (Spokane); 1,487 – (Tri-Cities); 2,419 – (Vancouver); 235 – (Everett); 2,669 (Global)
- Postgraduates: 2,797 – (Total, Fall 2025)
- Doctoral students: 1,280 – (Total, Fall 2025)
- Location: Pullman, Washington, United States; 46.73°N 117.16°W
- Campus: 1,742 acres (7.05 km^{2}); Distant town
- Other campuses: Everett; Richland; Spokane; Vancouver
- Newspaper: The Daily Evergreen
- Colors: Crimson and gray
- Nickname: Cougars
- Sporting affiliations: NCAA Division I FBS – Pac-12; MPSF
- Mascot: Butch T. Cougar
- Website: wsu.edu

Washington State University (WSU, or colloquially Wazzu) is a public land-grant research university in Pullman, Washington, United States. Founded in 1890, WSU is also one of the oldest land-grant universities in the American West. With an undergraduate enrollment of 24,278 and a total enrollment of 28,581, it is the second largest institution of higher education in Washington state behind the University of Washington. It is classified among "R1: Very High Research Spending and Doctorate Production".

The WSU Pullman campus stands on a hill and is characterized by open spaces and a red brick and basalt material palette—materials originally found on site. The university sits within the rolling topography of the Palouse in rural eastern Washington and remains closely connected to the town and the region. The university also operates campuses across Washington at WSU Spokane, WSU Tri-Cities, and WSU Vancouver, all founded in 1989. In 2012, WSU launched an Internet-based Global Campus, which includes its online degree program, WSU Online. In 2015, WSU expanded to a sixth campus at WSU Everett. These campuses award primarily bachelor's and master's degrees. Freshmen and sophomores were first admitted to the Vancouver campus in 2006 and to the Tri-Cities campus in 2007.

WSU's athletic teams are called the Cougars and the school colors are crimson and gray. They are members of the Pac-12 Conference, which resumed full operations in 2026 with 7 new member institutions, after the departure of 10 member institutions in 2024. The men's and women's indoor track teams compete in the Mountain Pacific Sports Federation.

== History ==
=== Agricultural College, Experiment Station, and School of Science ===
In 1862, President Abraham Lincoln signed the Morrill Act of 1862 into law, allowing for the creation of land-grant colleges “to teach such branches of learning as are related to agriculture and the mechanic arts ...in order to promote the liberal and practical education of the industrial classes." The Hatch Act of 1887 expanded on the Morrill Act, providing federal funds for the establishment of agriculture experiment stations at land-grant colleges. Shortly after attaining statehood on November 11, 1889, the Washington State Legislature began taking steps to claim a land-grant college, and fewer than five months later on March 28, 1890, passed House Bill 90 for the creation of the Agricultural College, Experiment Station and School of Science of the State of Washington. Governor Elisha P. Ferry signed the bill into law a few days later. Soon after, a second act of legislature expanded the school's educational mission to include general arts and sciences. The university and the experiment station would aid enterprise by improving farm management, conducting research, and teaching the skills needed to be better farmers. WSU's role as a statewide institution became clear in 1894 with the launch of its first agricultural experiment station west of the Cascade Mountains near Puyallup.

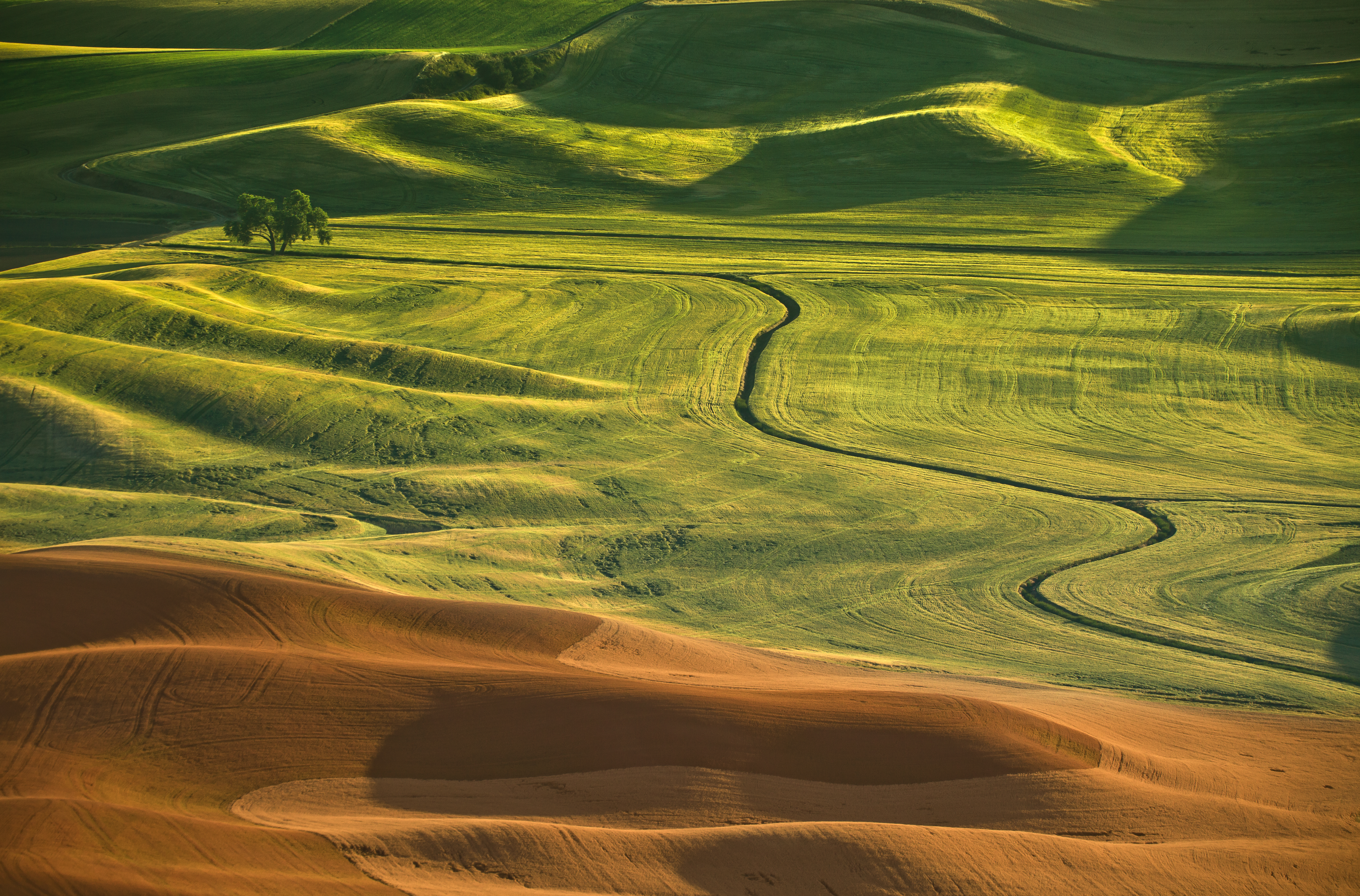
View of the Palouse at Steptoe Butte

According to the legislation, the site of the land-grant college was to be determined by a three-member committee appointed by the governor, but it stipulated that the site must be located in the southeast corner of the state. After an exhaustive examination of bidding towns such as Yakima and other towns in the Palouse region, the state's new land-grant college opened to 59 students in Pullman on January 13, 1892, offering three major courses of study: agriculture, engineering, and domestic science. Pullman was possibly selected because of a generous land gift by the city and its railroad connections to Spokane and Portland, Oregon. A five-member Board of Regents was appointed with George W. Lilley acting as the school's first President.

The school started out with a faculty of five, with a student-body largely consisting of children from the surrounding community, who, if they were residents of Washington would have attended tuition-free. The year 1897 saw the first graduating class of seven men and women.

==== The Bryan years ====
Enoch Albert Bryan, appointed July 22, 1893, and serving for 22 years, was the first influential president of WSU and considered by many as the true founder of the university. Bryan previously served as the president of Vincennes University in Indiana and was an alumnus of Indiana University and held a graduate degree from Harvard. When Bryan learned he was nominated for the presidency by a friend in Oregon, he had never even heard of the college. Before Bryan's arrival, the fledgling university suffered through significant organizational instability. Under Bryan's term as president, the curriculum included both a practical and liberal arts component, where chemistry, mathematics as well as history, English literature and two foreign languages were core courses, required for graduation regardless of major. Under Bryan, music and art held importance too, in 1905 he gained the approval of the Board of Regents for a School of Music. During this time, a committee approved the decision to change the school colors of blue and pink to the crimson and gray we see today. Bryan guided the college toward respectability and is arguably the most influential figure in the university's history. The landmark clock tower in the center of campus is his namesake. As the college approached the end of its first decade of existence, Bryan and others tried to garner the necessary support to change the name of the school, which resulted in the introduction of a bill to change the school name to “Washington State College” in 1899. This and similar efforts in 1901 and 1903 were defeated with strong opposition for attempting to create another state university which would undermine the clout of the University of Washington (UW) in Seattle. However, in 1905 the school was finally able to officially change its name to the “State College of Washington” or more informally as Washington State College (WSC).

=== Washington State College ===
Ernest O. Holland succeeded Enoch Bryan as President of the Washington State College in 1915. That same year, a close friend of his whom he shared a room with while studying at Columbia University, Henry Suzzallo, became the President of the University of Washington. Holland's early years as president and friendship with Suzzallo were challenged during his tenure as president. In 1909, the institutional rivalry between WSC and UW worsened when state legislators, the majority of which held seats in western Washington, were dismayed to find a foreign language department, an English Department headed by a Harvard-educated PhD, a school of architecture, and many departments with graduate students, which they felt expanded beyond the college's scope. The legislative committee promptly advised demoting the college to “trade school” status, an idea which Suzzallo supported. Suzzallo penned a letter to Holland promising to make WSC “the greatest school of agriculture in the world” only if Holland agreed to abandon all other disciplines to UW; Suzzallo's proposal specifically sought to shut down WSC's schools of architecture and pharmacy. After years of wrangling, the Washington legislature decided against limiting the academic mission and scope of WSC. The two presidents and their respective institutions continued to have a row over curriculum and state appropriations until Suzzallo was relieved of his position in 1926 due to the influence of Washington governor, Roland H. Hartley. In trying to outdo his former peer at UW, Holland wanted to build a library that rivaled the grandness of the newly built library at UW that bears Suzzallo's name. Funding for the Holland Library was delayed by the state however until 1950.

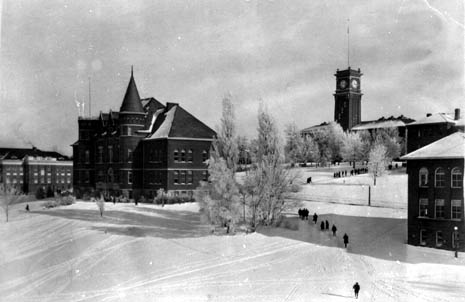
Thompson and Bryan Halls in 1925

Budgetary woes hit WSC in the Great Depression years starting in the 1930s. The budget, faculty, salaries, and enrollment slumped dramatically. Enrollment didn't reach pre-Depression levels until 1936 and salaries until 1937 in nominal terms. With the start of World War II, the Washington State College was contracted by the War Department to house and train the Army Signal Corps where they were given pre-flight school training and lessons in Japanese language. The college hosted as many as 1,900 military personnel in the vacated dormitories and fraternities. It was during this time in 1944 however, when WSC saw the exciting introduction of the Cougar Gold brand of sharp white cheddar cheese from the campus creamery. The cheese was developed and gets its namesake from dairy bacteriologist Dr. N.S. Golding who was studying molds for cheese production. After the war ended and the passing of the G.I. Bill, the college went from having virtually no men on campus to being inundated with them. The school had to scramble to accommodate the former servicemen by buying migrant housing and using temporary housing units provided by the federal government. The campus became so crowded, that President Wilson Compton mulled over moving the college to Spokane, but, in 1947, he ultimately determined that it would be impractical.

=== Washington State University ===
On March 4, 1959, Washington State governor Albert Rosellini signed a legislative bill that officially changed the name to Washington State University, effective September 1, 1959. The maturing university partly owed the success of this to the establishment of the WSU Honors College, which is one of the oldest in the nation and a highly respected university program for gifted students. The university joined the Athletic Association of Western Universities in 1962, which included the University of Washington, and four other universities in California at the time. In an effort to improve the graduate program and research credentials of WSU, a low-grade nuclear reactor was constructed, funded by Atomic Energy Commission grants, and new doctoral programs were introduced.

By the 1970s, WSU's enrollment quadrupled from its level in the 1940s to 14,000 students with an influx from the Baby Boom Generation. President Glenn Terrell took steps to increase funding for undergraduate and graduate education amid the nationwide recession of the mid-1970s. Terrell didn't make any major cuts to the athletics department however, which didn't go unnoticed and was a cause for anger about his leadership among some of the faculty.

==== State-wide university ====
Beginning with the start of Samuel H. Smith’s term as president in 1985, marked a large period of growth for WSU. In 1989, WSU gained branch campuses in Spokane, the Tri-Cities, and Vancouver with established extension offices and research centers in all regions of the state, with facilities in Prosser and Wenatchee. Smith proved to be a consummate fundraiser, with about $760 million raised during his term, thanks in some part to Microsoft co-founder and alumnus Paul Allen. In the 1990s Smith began to clamp down and take action regarding student alcohol abuse and disciplinary issues after some high-profile incidents on campus in an effort to improve the university's image. The efforts seemed to have paid off when WSU lost its rank and was completely excluded from The Princeton Review’s party school list in August 2000. Improving the quality of education was the defining goal of the university under V. Lane Rawlins, who raised admission requirements and sought to improve the academic profile of the school with improved curricula and research facilities. After Rawlins retired in 2006, Elson Floyd succeeded him as president. Under Floyd's leadership, increasing the diversity of the student body and continuing to raise the stature and reach of the university were a focus. In his eight years as president, WSU enrollment figures went up by 17 percent, including a 12.5 percent increase in the number of students of color, the amount of research grants awarded to WSU tripled to $600 million a year, and he led expansions in all of WSU's branch campuses-most notably successfully campaigning for the creation of the public medical school that now bears his name at WSU - Spokane, the Elson S. Floyd College of Medicine. The second public medical school in Washington, and only one of three in the state, is seen as key to the university's organizational mission as a state land-grant university and its ambitions as a research university. Created five years after the passage of the Affordable Care Act in 2015, the medical school's goal is to alleviate a physician shortage in rural and eastern Washington using a community-based approach. The med school is said to be a key component in the university's new research-focused $1.5 billion Drive to 25 campaign under President Kirk Schulz, which seeks to make WSU among the nations top 25 public research universities by 2030. The Elson S. Floyd College of Medicine achieved full accreditation in June 2021.

== Campus ==
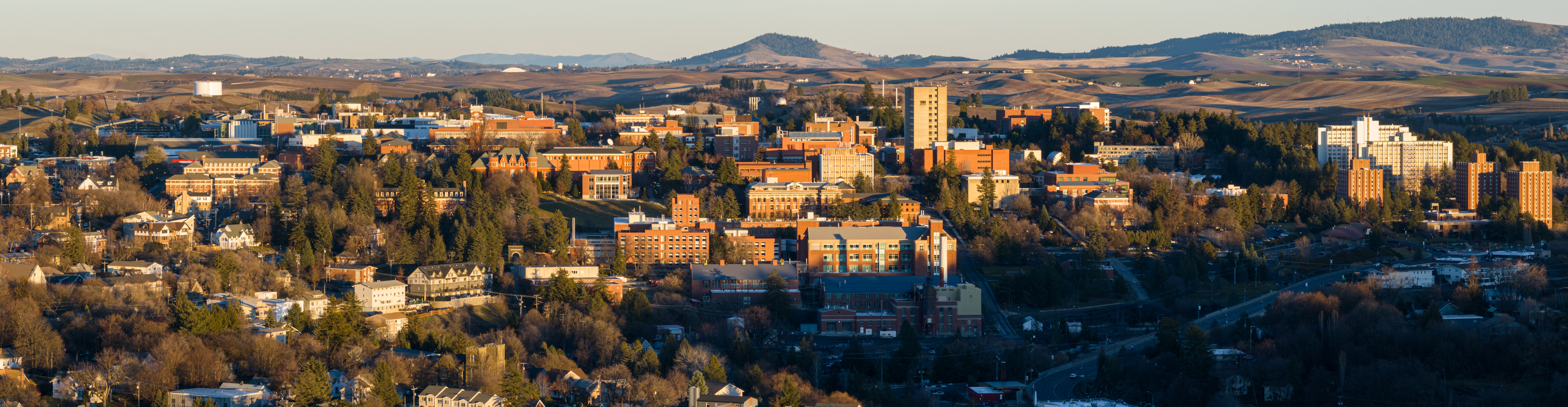
Aerial view of the campus

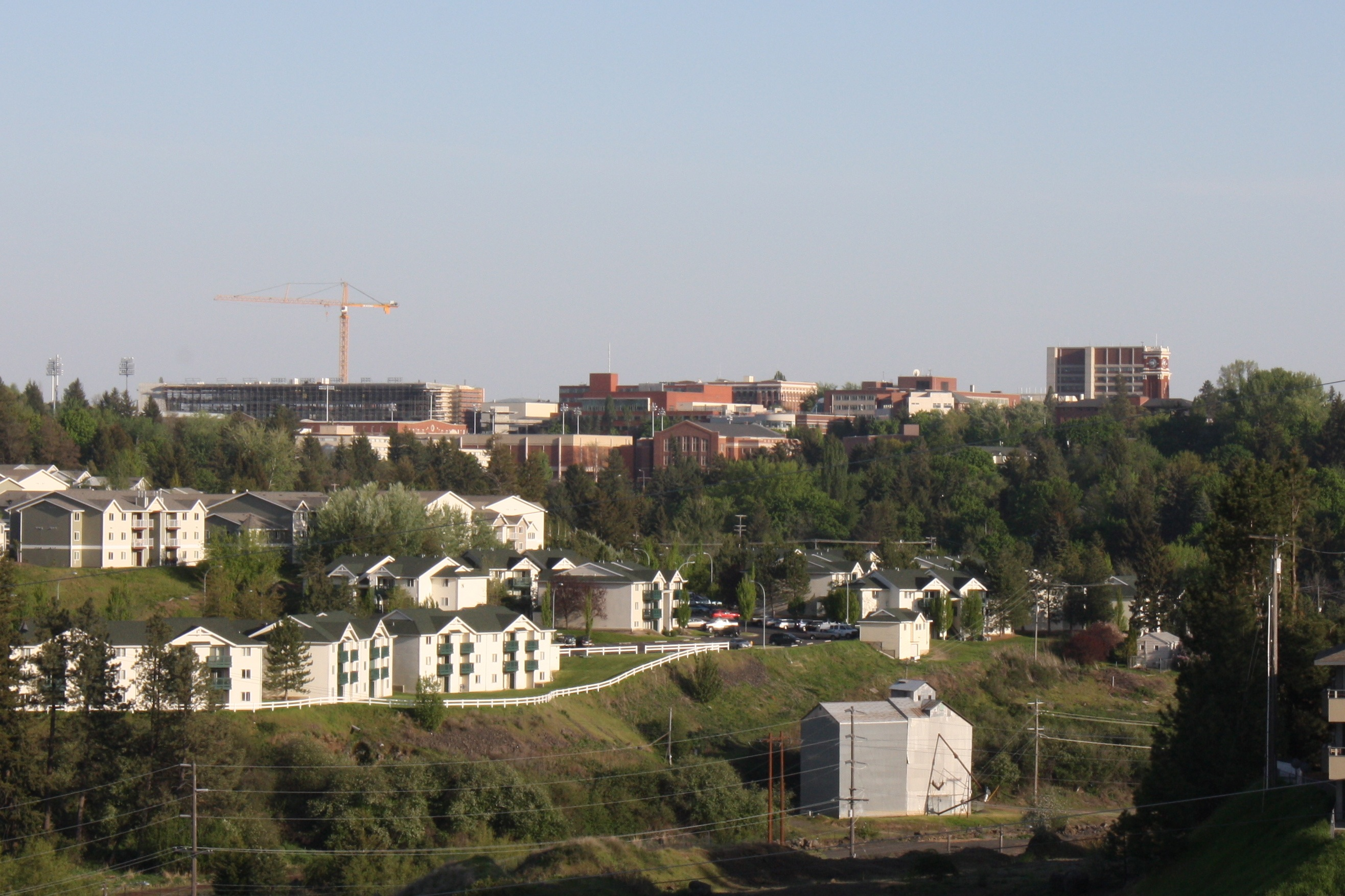
WSU campus from the northwest

The Pullman campus of Washington State University is 620 acres (2.5 km^{2}) and is in the Palouse region. The average elevation of the campus is approximately 2,500 feet (760 m) above sea level, and is seven miles (11 km) west of the Idaho border and Moscow, home of the University of Idaho, also a land-grant and R1 research institution. The university communities are connected by Highway 270 and the Bill Chipman Palouse Trail.

The Palouse is defined by its unique rolling hills that were created by wind-blown soil, which supports one of the world's most productive dry-land agricultural regions. The main crops are wheat, peas, barley, and lentils. Evenings are often highlighted by a spectacular blue-pink sunset, which the first Board of Regents decided to use as the college's colors (later changed to the current crimson and gray colors). Perched atop College Hill (one of the four main hills in Pullman), the campus overlooks downtown Pullman.

=== Built environment ===
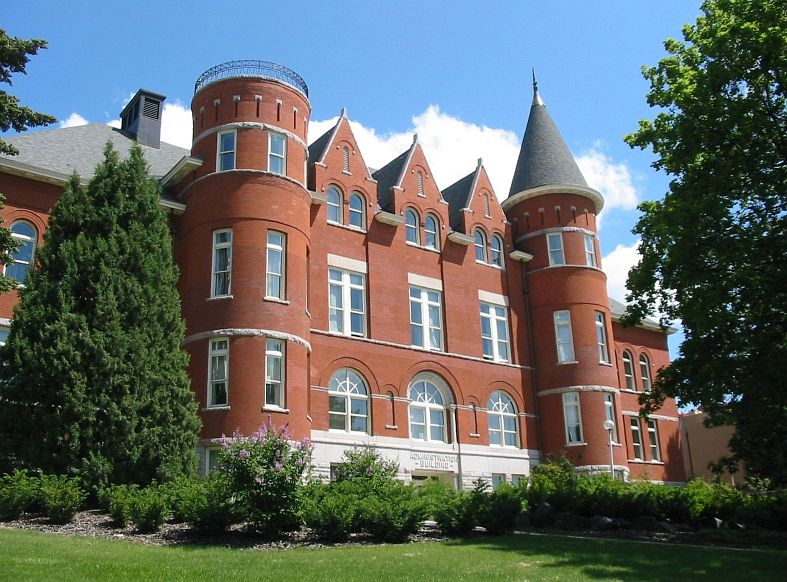
Thompson Hall (1894), known as the Administration Building until renamed in 1972

Campus architecture is diverse, but its prevailing image is perhaps best characterized by a handful of red-brick buildings in the older campus core designed in a neo-Georgian or Renaissance Revival mode, many of which were constructed between the world wars. Yet WSU was hardly immune to modernist, "international style" trends of the post-World War II period, and features some notable examples of the type, particularly the Regents Hill dormitory complex, designed by Paul Thiry, on the north side of campus. By the 1990s, the university began to encourage eye-catching designs, including a 1994 addition to the old Holland Library (now called Terrell Library), by the Zimmer Gunsul Frasca Partnership (now ZGF Architects LLP) with a curving sweep of windows and a cone-shaped skylight above its atrium; an amenity-filled recreation center with a massive Jacuzzi and fireplace in 2001; and the Samuel H. Smith Center for Undergraduate Education, or "CUE," named for WSU president Smith, who served from 1985 to 2000. The latter two buildings were designed by Yost Grube Hall of Portland.

The busiest part of campus is the Glenn Terrell Friendship Mall, referred to as "the mall" by students. This walkway, which prior to the 1970s was a road with parking available along the sides, was named after Terrell, WSU's president from 1967 to 1985. His secretary was known to set meetings ten minutes behind schedule to make up for the time he would spend talking to students along the way. The library complex (Terrell and Holland Libraries), the student union (Compton Union Building), and three academic buildings surround the mall. The new crimson-colored cube that distinguishes the Jordan Schnitzer Museum of Art opened in the spring of 2018, just across from the club seating entrance to the football stadium.

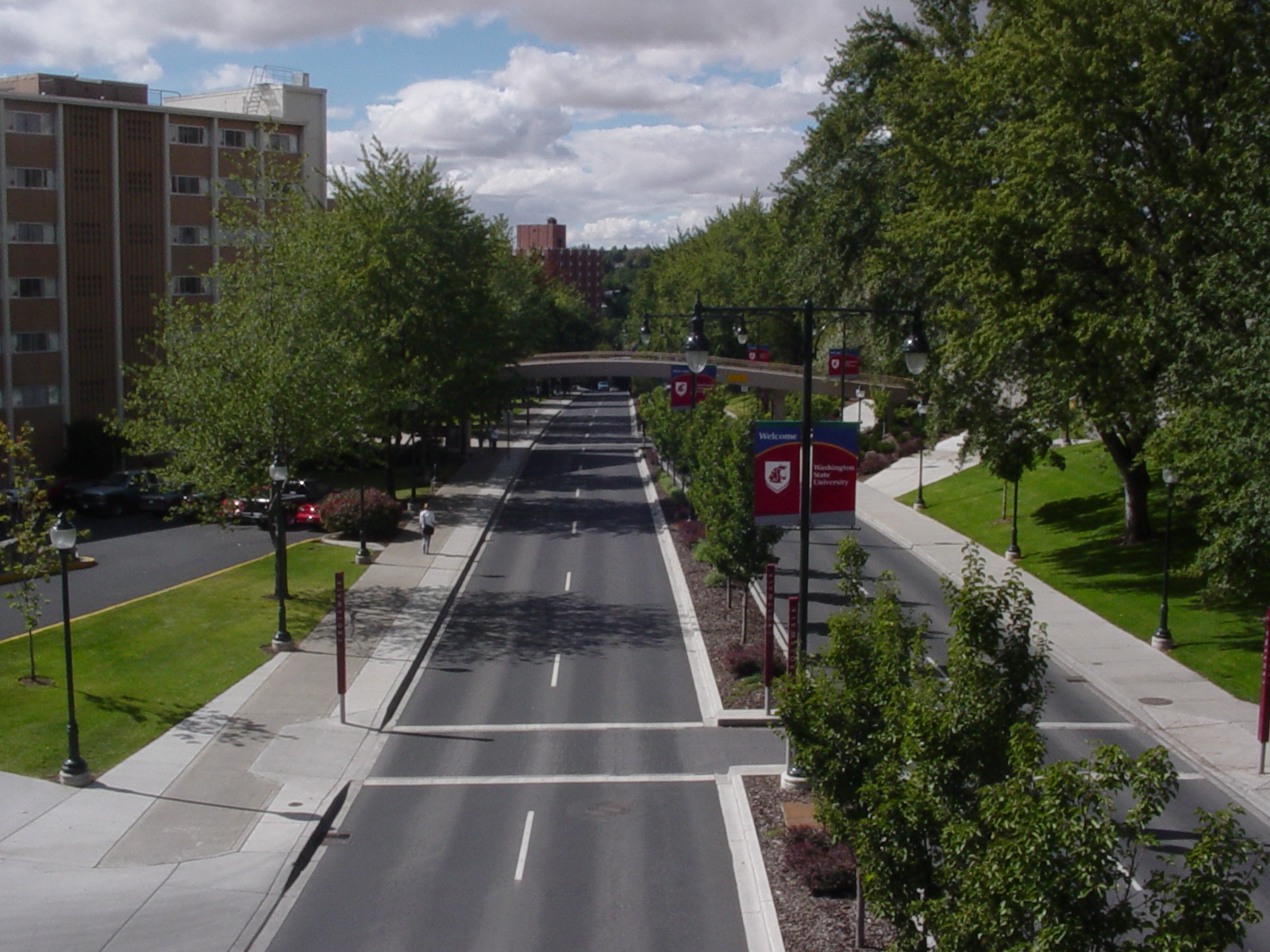
Stadium Way

The football venue, Martin Stadium, named after Governor Clarence D. Martin, also figures prominently on campus. It is situated near the geographical center of the campus with the south grandstands built into the Hill (the Information Technology building is part of the south grandstands), and Terrell Library and the Vogel Plant BioSciences buildings overlooking the west and east ends, respectively. Football has been played here since 1895, first as Soldier Field, later renamed Rogers Field, rebuilt in 1936. After a fire to the main wooden grandstand in 1970, it was replaced with Martin Stadium, which opened 54 years ago in 1972. Even though it is the smallest in the Pac-12, it offers the most seating to students in the conference. After the 2006 season, Martin Stadium went under a massive renovation to expand the seating capacity and offer greater amenities for players and spectators, as well as made improvements to the general facilities such as bathrooms and concession stands. The Cougar Football Project is the proposed renovation of Martin Stadium that consists of two separate projects. The first project, called the Southside Project, would replace the old press box on the south stands with a new structure that includes a new press box, club seats, loge boxes, luxury suites and a club room. The Southside Project is now finished and was completed in November 2012. The second project, originally called the "West End-Zone Project" and now the Football Operations Building, provides a home for the Cougar football program, and includes new weight, locker, equipment. and training rooms for players, in addition to meeting rooms and coaches' offices. It also features a WSU Football heritage area along the west side and a game-day home for Gray W former letter winners.

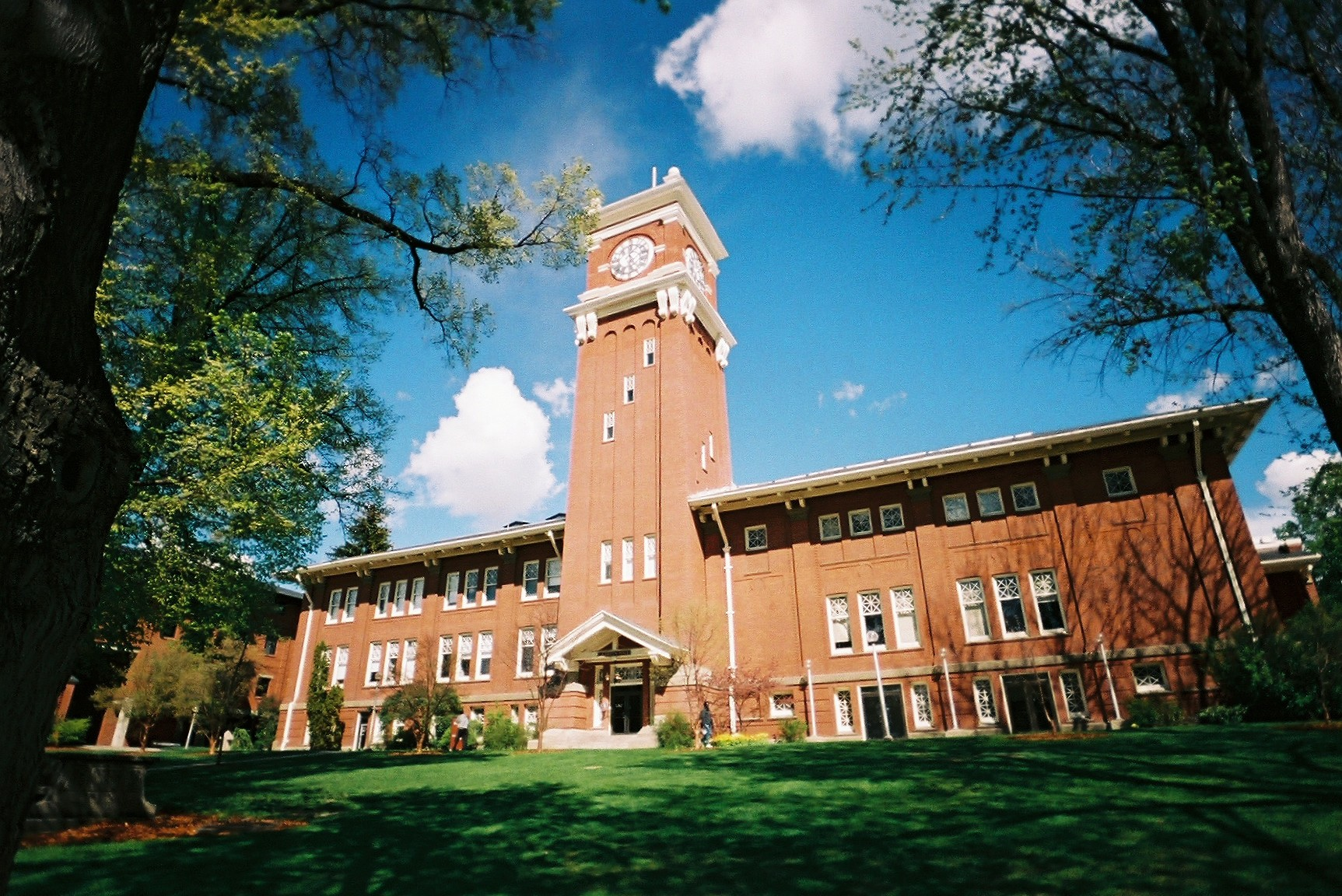
Bryan Hall (1909), with landmark clock tower

Other notable buildings include Thompson Hall (1895), Stevens Hall (1895), the Math Learning Annex (1908), and Bryan Hall (1909), the university's oldest surviving buildings which help enclose a sloping quadrangle featuring the "Lowell Elm," a large American elm (Ulmus americana) brought from Elmwood in 1893 by Harriet Bryan, wife of newly appointed president Bryan. Thompson Hall, with its distinctive turrets and its resemblance to a chateau in the Loire Valley of France, was the original administration building, and "Administration Building" is still carved above the original west-facing entrance. Today, Thompson Hall is home to the foreign language department and also provides the administrative offices for the College of Arts and Sciences. Bryan Hall is perhaps the most noticeable building on campus, with its tall four-sided tower enclosing a carillon and displaying a clock that lights up neon-red in the evening. Stevens Hall, to Bryan Hall's northwest, is reputed to be the oldest surviving all-women's dormitory west of the Mississippi although it is now closed. Stevens Hall and Thompson Hall are on the National Register of Historic Places, and both were designed by the Seattle firm of Stephen & Josenhans.

Also significant are the Lewis Alumni Centre and the Webster Physical Science Building. The alumni center is an old beef cattle barn dating from the 1920s that was thoroughly transformed in the 1980s into event space and offices for the WSU Alumni Association. Rooms in the alumni center include the Board of Regents' Boardroom, Lighty Library, the Athletics Hall of Fame, the Alumni Presidents' Room, and the "Great Hall" for large social events on the second floor. Webster Hall, completed in 1974 and designed by the Seattle-based architectural firm of Naramore, Bain, Brady, and Johanson (NBBJ) is the tallest building on campus with twelve above-ground floors of offices and an expansive view of the region from a lounge on the northwest side of the top floor.

From 1911 to 1923, Rudolph Weaver was the first chairman of the architecture department. He designed seven buildings on the WSU campus, including:

- Beef Barn, now the Lewis Alumni Centre, 1922
- Carpenter Hall, which was not finished until 1927.
- Community Hall. 1921
- McCroskey Hall, 1920
- President's House, 1912.
- Stimson Hall, 1922
- Wilson-Short Hall, 1917, first used, but not finished until later.

=== Residential campus ===
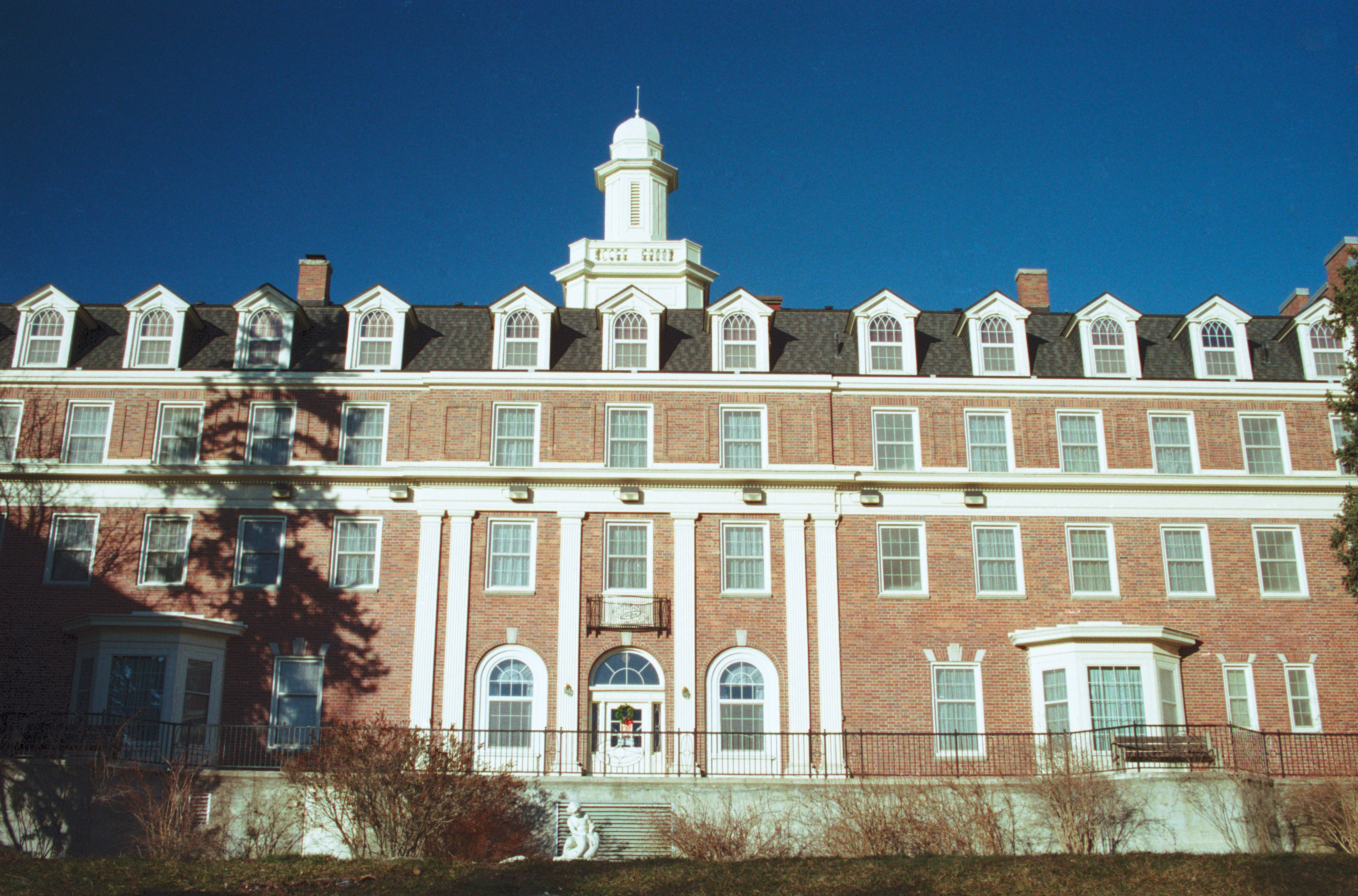
Stimson Hall (1922)

WSU is a residential campus. Many freshmen live in residence halls, while some live in fraternity and sorority houses or in off-campus housing. After their first year, many students move to apartments, several owned by WSU. Most apartments are less than 1/2-mile (0.8 km) from campus. Off-campus housing is popularly divided into two sections that are commonly known by students as College Hill and "Apartment Land." College Hill houses many members of the Greek community who no longer live-in their fraternity/sorority houses, and are commonly known as "live-outs".

=== Residence halls ===
A number of the residence halls are co-ed, but there are single-gender living environments as well as a variety of other living options that include age-restricted housing, a mix of domestic and international students, and a global learning community. All of the residence halls, except for McEachern, are part of the RHA (Residence Hall Association).

Residence halls on campus include:

- The Hill Halls: Community/Duncan-Dunn, Elmina White Honors Hall, McCroskey, Wilmer-Davis, and Stevens
- The Northside Halls: Regents Hill, Scott/Coman, Streit-Perham, Northside, and Global Scholars
- Southside Halls: Stimson, Waller, Gannon-Goldsworthy, Rogers, Orton, McEachern, and Olympia
- The Stephenson Residential Complex: Stephenson East, Stephenson North, and Stephenson South

Each hall has its own government which organizes events, manages its budget, and acts as a forum for student involvement. These halls range in size from the exclusive Stevens Hall (approximately 70 residents), to the massive Stephenson Complex (approximately 1200 residents total). The highlight of the year for the residence halls is often Homecoming Week when the residence halls, off-campus students, and Greeks compete in various events. Events such as the chariot race determine the winner of Homecoming Week. In the past decade, the winner of Homecoming Week has most often been a residence hall team.

=== Greek life ===
There are currently 27 fraternities in the Interfraternity Council, 14 sororities in the Panhellenic Council, 14 fraternities and sororities in the United Greek Association, and 10 fraternities and sororities in the National Panhellenic Council at Washington State University. There are 26 primarily residential fraternities and 14 primary residential sororities that are located on College Hill. Kappa Sigma is the oldest national fraternity at WSU with a founding date in 1909 and Alpha Delta Pi was the first sorority at WSU with a founding date in 1912. The average chapter size of the community organizations is 64 members. Between 25 and 30 percent of undergraduate students are in the Greek community annually. Greek affiliates have the highest GPA on WSU's campus, averaging 3.2 for sorority women and 2.97 for fraternity men based on figures from Spring 2018. Individuals join chapters by going through recruitment, often a week at the beginning of one or both semesters where chapter members hold events to meet potential new members. Washington State University has a zero tolerance policy on hazing both potential new members and current members. Each year Greek chapters submit 6 Pillars of Excellence, each pillar representing a value of Greek Life at WSU, and do reports at the end of the year as a self-evaluation for each chapter. Washington State University "recognizes the right of each fraternity and sorority to create policies and regulations of internal governance, as long as said policies do not conflict with those described in this document or any of its appendices."

=== Recreation and the outdoors ===
The university has the 160,000-square-foot (15,000 m^{2}) Student Recreation Center (SRC), which was the largest student recreation center in the United States when it was opened in 2001. The SRC contains a 1/8-mile (0.2 km) elevated indoor track, four basketball courts, two volleyball courts, roller hockey rink, four racquetball courts, swimming pool, 50-person Jacuzzi, free weights, weight machines, cardio equipment, exercise instruction rooms, outdoor sand volleyball courts, and a low to high ropes course. The campus also has several other basketball courts, dance rooms, a climbing wall, and the Outdoor Recreation Center where students can check out equipment or register for various events and trips. The seven-mile (11 km) Bill Chipman Palouse Trail links Pullman with Moscow and links to the Latah Trail to Troy, 22 miles (35 km) from WSU. Another bike trail wraps around the Pullman campus (about eight miles or 13 kilometres long). The school has an intramural program, and club sports are also very popular on campus. The university also has The Chinook, a 69,000 square foot space designed for students. It features fitness facilities, study spaces, social spaces for events, and Freshens Fresh Food Studio.

The campus added a 7,305-yard (6,680 m) championship golf course in 2008; Palouse Ridge, a $12.3 million project, opened on August 29. It intends to improve the school's golf teams, provide a laboratory for students in turf grass courses, and give boosters and alumni a new reason to visit the campus. From the back tees (Crimson), the course rating is 75.9 with a slope rating of 140. It replaces a sub-standard 9-hole course that was built in 1923 and was mostly unimproved. It closed in 2006 for the redesign to create Palouse Ridge, on the same site and adjacent land. The UI Golf Course in Moscow also offers student rates. It opened in 1937 and added its second nine in 1970; the back tees are at 6,637 yards (6,069 m), with a course rating of 72.4 and a slope rating of 135.

Within 35 miles (56 km), many students have the option to hike at Kamiak Butte and Steptoe Butte. Moscow Mountain, at 4,983 feet (1,519 m) in the Palouse Range in Idaho, provides opportunities for hiking and mountain biking. For aquatic adventures, students can cliff jump or boat at the Snake River. Farther out, white-river rafting, downhill skiing, and hiking in the nearby foothills of the Rocky Mountains are available. WSU formerly operated its own alpine ski area in Idaho, the North-South Ski Bowl, which was sold in the early 1980s.

=== Arboretum and Botanical Garden ===
The WSU Arboretum Committee continues to develop an Arboretum and Botanical Garden on a hilltop adjacent to the Lewis Alumni Center. In addition, about 95 acres (38 ha) on the east edge of campus has been identified for a more expansive Arboretum and Botanical Garden, including a wildlife center. Students interested in contributing to the development of the WSU Arboretum are working with the Native Plant & Landscape Restoration Nursery to help establish tree plantings, future habitat restoration sites, or native plant displays that may be part of a campus green belt design.

=== Environmental record and sustainability initiatives ===
==== Energy use on campus ====
WSU has one LEED-silver certified building on campus, and two more buildings that meet LEED-silver standards but are not certified. The university has also encouraged the use of energy efficient lighting, energy management systems, and insulating steam lines, to reduce wasted power.

==== Energy profile ====
WSU's energy is generated in part by an on-campus steam plant, powered by natural gas with diesel fuel back-up. This accounts for 38% of carbon emissions, or 53,922 metric tonnes eCO_{2} out of 136,166 metric tons total. The remaining carbon emissions is predominantly the result of purchased electricity (52%), with less than 10% the result of commuting, air travel, refrigerant leaks, and waste incineration. The university has committed to lowering carbon emissions 36% below 2005 levels by 2035, though thus far emission levels have remained relatively flat.

WSU is active in clean energy research, though the campus does not currently have any renewable energy installations.

==== Energy investments ====
WSU does not currently commit to establishing a committee or policy that supports climate and sustainability shareholder proposals at companies where the endowment funds are invested. The university is exploring investing in renewable energy, but otherwise is focused on optimizing investment returns. Proxy voting is not possible due to the fact the endowment fund is entirely invested in comingled investment vehicles.

==== Sustainability ====
The university promotes on-campus sustainability primarily though the Sustainability and Environment Committee and the ASWSU Environmental Task Force. Undergraduates who have an idea to improve campus sustainability can apply for funding from the Cougar Green Fund, which is funded by an optional $5 student fee. WSU also provides a free bikeshare system through its Greenbike program.

=== Museums and collections ===
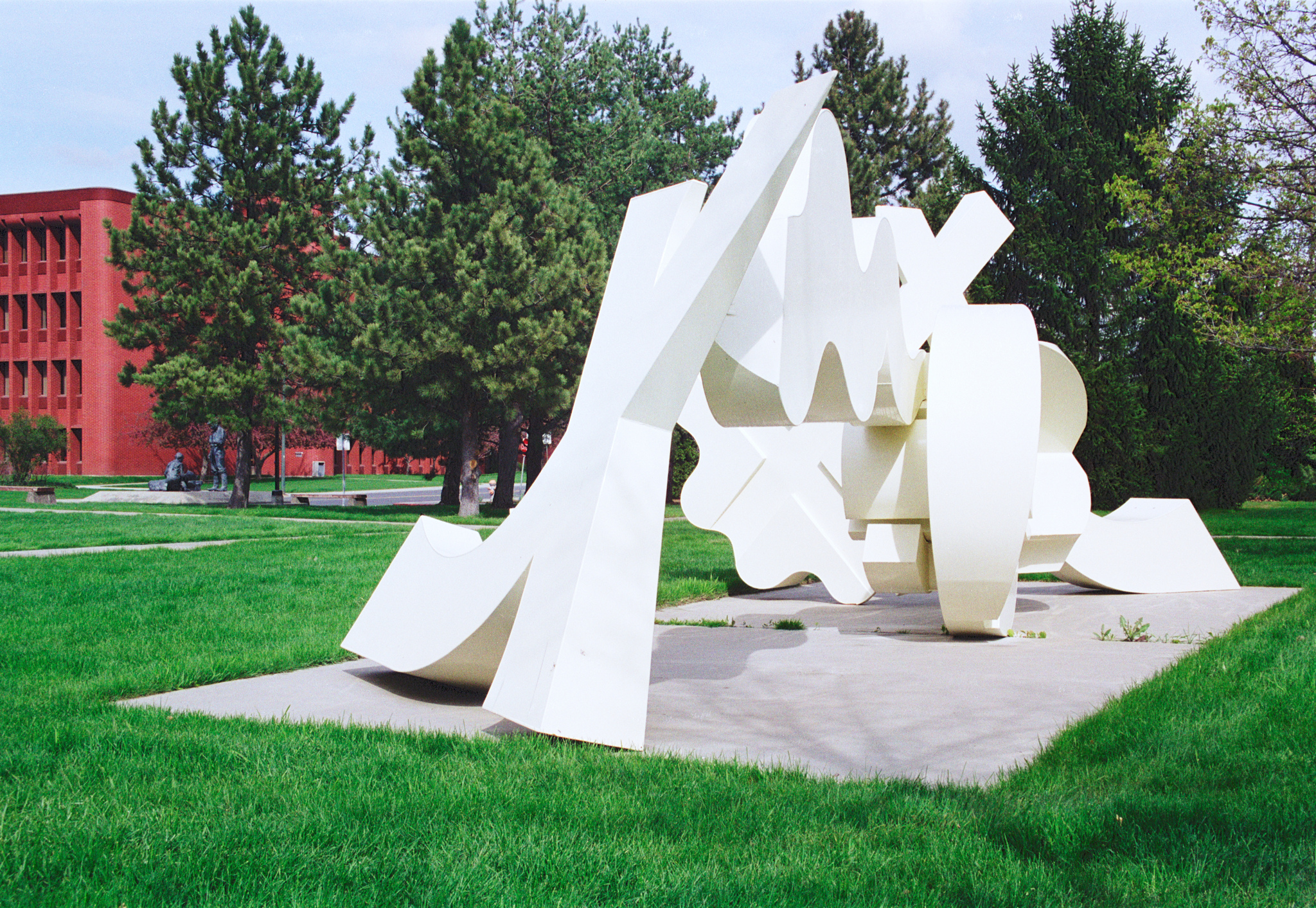
Public art

The Museum of Art/WSU has several permanent collections, including the Ernest O. Holland Collection given by the university's fourth president and the Charles Orton Collection, given by a former regent. Others are the Goya and Daumier Collections, Chaplin Woodcuts, Consortium Collections, Meyer Shapiro Print Collection, Elwood Collection and Marian E. Smith Collection of Northwest glass art. Other permanent collections contain works by Northwest artists D. Griffin, Mark Tobey, Kenneth Callahan, Margaret Tomkins, and former faculty members from WSU and the University of Washington.

The university also has an extensive collection of outdoor art on its Pullman campus. Pieces range from a life-size bronze book-figure "Bookin'" by Terry Allen to "Palouse Columns" (2003) by Robert Maki to "The Technicolor Heart," a fourteen-foot painted bronze work by Jim Dine. A large part of WSU's public art collection is made possible by the percent-for-art Art in Public Places program of the Washington State Arts Commission.

Beginning in 2005 the Museum of Art began organizing its own traveling exhibitions. These exhibitions, including works by Roy Lichtenstein, Gaylen Hansen, and Chris Jordan, have been seen across the country. Between 2005 and 2011, exhibitions organized by the Museum of Art will have traveled to 20 museums in 11 states, and will have been seen by more than 300,000 people. The Museum has also published 6 trade books since 2004. The Museum of Art's latest exhibition publication, Running the Numbers, an American self-portrait, features essays by Chris Bruce, Paul Hawken and Lucy R. Lippard.

Several other museums and collections are found on the WSU Pullman campus. One of the largest is the Charles R. Conner Museum of Natural History, exhibiting more than 700 mounts of birds and mammals, and possessing more than 65,000 research specimens. The Connor Museum has its roots in an 1894 gift of the state of Washington's exhibits from the Chicago's World's Fair, encouraged by then President of the Board of Regents Charles R. Conner. Located on the first floor of Abelson Hall, the museum is open 8 a.m.–5 p.m. daily except major holidays.

The Museum of Anthropology, with archaeological and ethnographic collections, also draws visitors. Open 9 a.m.–4 p.m. Monday through Friday during the school year, the museum has varied exhibits and special events. It also has a collection of objects representing the culture of Native American tribes in the Inland Northwest, and is an official repository for archaeological collections from Eastern Washington.

Also at WSU are the Harold E. Culver Collection, with fossils of pre-historic animals; the Lyle and Lela Jacklin Collection of Silicified Wood & Minerals; and S. Elroy McCaw Fluorescent Mineral Display. Research collections include an Historic Costume and Textiles Collection, the Maurice T. James Entomological Collection, the Marion Ownbey Herbarium, the Mycological Herbarium, and the Henry W. Smith Soil Monolith Collection.

== Organization and administration ==
The university offers bachelor's, master's and doctoral degrees in 200 fields of study through 65 departments, schools, and programs.

=== Colleges ===
These departments, schools, and programs are organized into 10 academic colleges as follows:

- College of Agricultural, Human, and Natural Resource Sciences
- College of Arts and Sciences
- Carson College of Business
- Edward R. Murrow College of Communication
- College of Education
- Voiland College of Engineering and Architecture
- Elson S. Floyd College of Medicine
- College of Nursing
- College of Pharmacy
- College of Veterinary Medicine

In addition, WSU has an all-university honors college, a graduate school, an online global campus, and an accredited intensive English program for non-native speakers (the Intensive American Language Center).

=== Board of regents ===
Washington State University is chartered by the State of Washington. A board of regents governs the university and provides direction to the president. There are ten regents appointed by the governor, nine of whom serve six-year terms. The tenth is a student regent appointed on an annual basis. A bill adding an eleventh regent, who would be a full-time or emeritus faculty member, stalled in the Washington legislature in 2018.

As of 2025, the regents are Lisa Keohokalole Schauer, Jenette Ramos, Marty Dickinson, Brett Blankenship, Enrique Cerna, Sam Hunt, Judith McDonald, Douglas T. Picha, Lura J. Powell, Kassandra Vogel (student), and Howard Wright III.

=== Leadership ===
Elizabeth R. Cantwell currently serves as WSU's president and chief executive officer. T. Chris Riley-Tillman currently serves as provost and handles academics, research and faculty matters for WSU statewide.

The following persons served as president of Washington State University:

No.	Image	President	Term start	Term end	Refs.
1		George W. Lilley	1891	1892	
2		John W. Heston	1892	1893	
3		Enoch A. Bryan	1893	1915	
4		Ernest O. Holland	1916	1944	
5		Wilson M. Compton	1945	1951	
acting		William Pearl	September 16, 1951	March 30, 1952	
6		C. Clement French	April 1, 1952	October 31, 1966	
acting		Wallis Beasley (Note: academic vice president)	November 1, 1966	June 30, 1967	
7		Glenn Terrell	July 1, 1967	June 30, 1985	
8		Samuel H. Smith	July 1, 1985	June 7, 2000	
9		V. Lane Rawlins	June 8, 2000	June 30, 2007	
10		Elson S. Floyd	May 21, 2007	June 20, 2015 (Note: Died in office.)	
acting		Daniel Bernardo (Note: Provost)	June 20, 2015	July 7, 2015	
interim		Daniel Bernardo	July 7, 2015	June 12, 2016	
11		Kirk Schulz	June 13, 2016	March 31, 2025	
12		Elizabeth Cantwell	April 1, 2025	present	

Table notes:

=== WSU Foundation ===
The WSU Foundation is an independent, private corporation with its own board of governors and chief executive officer that serves as a fundraising organization for the university. The board chair is Judy Rogers.

=== Faculty ===
The faculty senate serves as the sounding board for the more than 2,261 faculty members. All major academic decisions must be approved by the senate. The senate is composed of representatives from each academic college and department, and from all five WSU campuses.

== Academics ==
=== Undergraduate admissions ===
For the 2022-2023 rankings, U.S. News & World Report reported WSU undergraduate admissions as "less selective" with an acceptance rate of 86%. Of the undergraduates admitted in the fall of 2016, 40.7% graduated in four years and, including the four year rate, 61.5% graduated in six years.

Fall freshman statistics*

	2016	2015	2014	2013	2012	2011	2010	2009	2008
Applicants	23,223	19,766	18,563	14,887	14,825	14,071	12,427	12,478	11,983
Admits	16,731	15,742	15,017	12,219	11,268	11,601	8,634	9,489	8,677
% admitted	72.0	79.6	80.9	82.1	76.0	82.4	69.4	76.0	72.4
Enrolled	4,527	4,727	4,458	4,163	4,389	4,473	3,288	3,668	3,710
Avg GPA	3.40	3.32	3.29	3.29	3.30	3.35	3.44	3.42	3.48

- WSU does not require students to submit SAT/ACT test scores as part of the application

process and does not use them in admission decisions.

For the 2024–2025 academic year, the middle 50% of enrolled students scored between 1040 and 1350 on the SAT (with a 50th percentile of 1190), between 510 and 670 on the SAT Evidence-Based Reading and Writing section (50th percentile: 590), and between 530 and 680 on the SAT Math section (50th percentile: 600).

=== Curriculum and fields of study ===
WSU has 12 colleges and a graduate school. The liberal arts and sciences have an important place in the curriculum, along with business, communication, education, architecture, pharmacy, nursing, and the traditional land-grant disciplines of agriculture, engineering, and veterinary medicine.

WSU offers more than 200 fields of study, including 98 majors, 86 minors, options, and over 140 graduate and professional degrees. Bachelor's degrees are available in all major areas, with master's and doctoral degrees available in most. The undergraduate core curriculum, including the writing program, is nationally recognized. WSU confers nearly 5,900 bachelor's, master's, professional, and doctoral degrees statewide in a typical year. WSU employs over 1,400 instructional faculty members.

=== Rankings ===
Academic rankings

National
- Forbes: 144
- U.S. News & World Report: 189 (tie)
- Washington Monthly: 48
- WSJ/College Pulse: 176

Global
- ARWU: 401–500
- QS: =423
- THE: 301–350
- U.S. News & World Report: 397 (tie)

National Program Rankings
Program	Ranking
Biological Sciences	98
Chemistry	88
Clinical Psychology	70
Computer Science	75
Criminology	25
Earth Sciences	68
Economics	78
Engineering	75
English	99
Fine Arts	89
Health Care Management	55
History	79
Mathematics	101
Nursing Schools: Bachelor's	93
Nursing Schools: Master's	45
Nursing Schools: Doctorate	25
Pharmacy	40
Physics	83
Political Science	81
Psychology	112
Public Affairs	117
Sociology	42
Speech-Language Pathology	72
Statistics	72
Veterinary Medicine	14

Global Program Rankings
Program	Ranking
Agricultural Sciences	34
Biology & Biochemistry	356
Chemistry	352
Clinical Medicine	341
Engineering	295
Environment/Ecology	202
Materials Science	269
Microbiology	196
Molecular Biology & Genetics	312
Physics	444
Plant & Animal Science	57
Social Sciences & Public Health	219

WSU was ranked tied for 189th of National Universities, tied for 103rd among Top Public Schools, tied for 134th of Best Colleges for Veterans, tied for 311th in Top Performers on Social Mobility, and 155th of Best Value Schools as published in the 2025 U.S. News & World Report rankings. In these rankings, it was also ranked tied for 79th Best Undergraduate Engineering Programs whose highest degree is a doctorate. WSU's College of Veterinary Medicine ranked tied for 15th out of 33 evaluated by U.S. News & World Report in 2023.

The Academic Ranking of World Universities (ARWU) in 2020 ranked WSU in the 95–114 range nationally and in the 301–400 range globally. WSU was ranked 400th in the world by the QS World University Rankings for 2020.

=== WSU Libraries ===
The WSU Libraries coordinate the administration of three major libraries on the WSU Pullman campus ( Holland/Terrell, and Owen Science & Engineering Libraries) and three libraries off the Pullman campus (WSU Health Sciences library, and the WSU Tri-Cities and WSU Vancouver libraries).

The WSU Libraries also participates in the Orbis Cascade Alliance, a consortium of 38 university and college libraries in Washington and Oregon offering the Summit catalog and an inter-library loan system. The WSU Libraries participates in the Greater Western Library Alliance (GWLA), a consortium of 39 research libraries in the central and western United States. WSU Libraries uses ILLiad, RAPID, Rapido (Ex Libris), and DOCLINE for document delivery. The WSU Libraries is a member of the Association of Research Libraries.

WSU Libraries employs faculty librarians and paraprofessional staff, in addition to student workers.

The WSU Libraries holds 2,266,616 print volumes and WSU faculty and students downloaded 2,022,603 from its licensed online collections in 2012.

=== Research ===
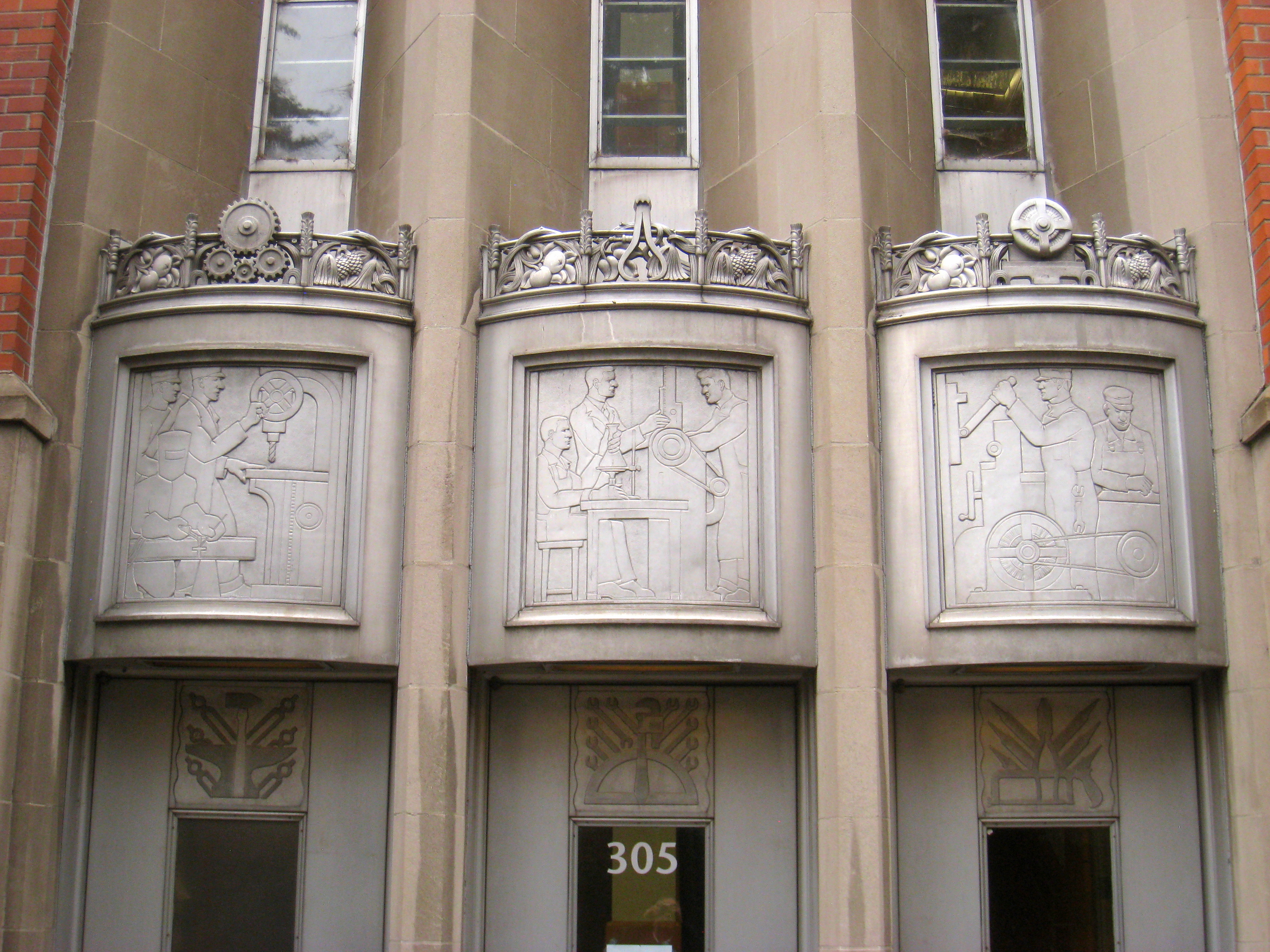
Homer J. Dana Hall (1948), College of Engineering and Architecture

According to the National Science Foundation, WSU spent $360 million on research and development in 2018, ranking it 71st in the nation.

Research and scholarship at WSU is rooted in agriculture, natural for a land-grant university. The institution's first leader, George W. Lilley (1891–1892), was both president of the then-named Washington Agricultural College and School of Science and director of the Washington Agricultural Experiment Station. Subjects taught by the first five faculty members included agriculture, botany, horticulture, forestry, and veterinary science.

In 1894, the sixth faculty member, William Jasper Spillman, arrived to teach plant science and mathematics and serve as the first wheat breeder. The WSU wheat research and breeding program continues to serve the Washington wheat industry, the sixth largest industry in the nation in 2008–2009. The state's wheat growers work closely with WSU researchers on development of new wheat varieties that meet their needs.

The university's food and agriculture research helps sustain the state's annual $29 billion food industry. Faculty partnered with agriculture interests to create today's $3 billion a year wine grape business. The Apple Genome Project draws collaboration from scientists worldwide to map the apple genome, research aimed at supporting the apple industry.

Food science is another long-time research field at WSU. Work in the 1940s on types of cheese suitable for storing in cans or tins led to creation of now award-winning Cougar Gold, a white cheddar produced at the WSU Creamery with milk from the university's dairy herd. In 2009, the Food and Drug Administration (FDA) approved the use of microwave energy for producing pre-packaged, low-acid foods, and WSU professor Juming Tang led development of the technology by university, industry and U.S. military scientists.

In terms of productivity, WSU plant sciences faculty rank No. 2 in the nation, animal sciences faculty rank fourth, and food science faculty rank sixth according to Academic Analytics' 2007 Faculty Scholarly Productivity Index. In addition, WSU agricultural studies have helped shape U.S. public policy by showing how sustainable farming practices sidestep the environmental hazards of conventional agriculture. The Climate Friendly Farming project helps farmers adopt methods that mitigate global climate change. Research in agriculture is a strength for WSU, where the university has led in research and development funding from the US Department of Agriculture.

Veterinary medicine and animal health are also important research areas at WSU. In 2008, a $25 million grant from the Bill & Melinda Gates Foundation funded a large share of the cost for a research facility for a new WSU School for Global Animal Health. Its scientists address global infectious disease challenges by detecting diseases within animal populations and controlling their transmission. The Washington Animal Disease Diagnostic Laboratory at WSU works closely with the U.S. Department of Agriculture and the Centers for Disease Control and Prevention to develop and deploy diagnostic tests for livestock diseases.

In the area of clean technologies, university researchers work to raise the efficiency and reliability of the nation's electrical power grid, improve air quality forecasting in the Northwest, and conduct cooperative research projects under the United States Department of Energy's Nuclear Energy Research Initiative (NERI). Scholars are developing an algae-based biofuel that consumes greenhouse gases in its production and are working to patent nanospring technology that would fit into an ordinary gas tank, solving the problem of hydrogen storage. In 2001, WSU professor M. Grant Norton and University of Idaho physics professor David McIlroy were the first scientists to create nanosprings.

WSU is also home to one of the few remaining nuclear research reactors in the country. The Nuclear Radiation Center is a 1 MW TRIGA conversion reactor built in 1961 during President Eisenhower's Atoms for Peace initiative. The reactor is used for research by WSU's radiochemistry graduate program and for public education through lectures and facility tours

Other recent research highlights include studies of the effects of sleep and sleep loss on human cognitive functioning, work to advance shock compression science with contracts awarded to the WSU Institute for Shock Physics by the Defense Advanced Research Projects Agency (DARPA) and the department of energy, and a program funded by the National Science Foundation that trains doctoral students to analyze evolutionary processes. Reproductive biologist Patricia A. Hunt was named one of the top 50 researchers of 2007 by Scientific American for her work showing a potential threat to human health posed by bisphenol A (BPA), a component of the polycarbonate plastics used to make food and beverage containers.

Over the years, WSU research and scholarship included the 1968 discovery of the Marmes Man at the Marmes Rockshelter in southeastern Washington, the nation's oldest human remains at that time; the development of high-yielding dwarf wheat; discovery of insect resistance to pesticides; and creation of a method to store cheese in tins, which led to the university's well known and still produced Cougar Gold Cheese. WSU fruit breeders have developed many varieties for the state including, in 1952, the sweet, yellow Rainier cherry, and in 2010 an apple specifically for Washington, named Cosmic Crisp. The RosBREED project, funded by the USDA-NIFA Specialty Crop Research Initiative, enables the routine application of modern genomics and genetics technologies in U.S. rosaceous crop breeding programs, hosted at Mainlab Bioinformatics, Washington State University.

=== Outreach and public service ===
The WSU Extension has offices in each of Washington's 39 counties, providing training and assistance in agricultural practices, natural resource management, human and life skills, diversity understanding and outreach, the state 4-H program, and many other programs. In 1973 in Seattle, WSU Extension founded the now national Master Gardener Programs of trained volunteers. WSU Extension faculty and staff have also provided assistance for programs in under-developed and developing countries. Many faculty members have appointments to do research, teach, and provide extension services.

The State of Washington's network of Small Business Development Centers is a cooperative effort of Washington State University, other public educational institutions, economic development organizations and the US Small Business Administration. A source of counsel on starting and growing small firms, the centers are found in 17 locations in Western Washington and seven location in Eastern and Central Washington.

The WSU Creamery, an outreach and teaching program, has garnered a reputation for fine dairy products, most notably the Cougar Gold cheese sold at the creamery store, Ferdinand's, as well as online and at some local Pullman stores. The cheese is regionally famous and fetches a starting price of $22 for a 30 oz can. Cougar Gold is marketed as "a white, sharp cheddar with a taste that resembles Swiss or Gouda" and is "aged for at least one year." Cougar Cheese also comes in other varieties, including American Cheddar, Smoky Cheddar, Viking, Dill Garlic, Sweet Basil, Hot Pepper and Crimson Fire.

Washington State University Press each year publishes an average of eight titles that focus on the American West, with particular emphasis on the prehistory, history, environment, politics, and culture of the greater Northwest region. A member of the Association of University Presses, the WSU Press publishes in varied genres, including scholarly and trade monographs, reminiscences, essays, biographies and works that tell the story of the West in innovative ways.

Through the Center for Civic Engagement on the Pullman campus, students participate in an estimated 30,000 hours annually of credit and non-credit service activities in the community.

In 2008, the Carnegie Foundation for the Advancement of Teaching granted WSU its Community Engagement elective classification, both for curricular engagement and for outreach and partnerships.

WSU operates a research extension out of Prosser, Washington. AgWeatherNet (AWN) provides access to current and historical weather data from Washington State University's automated weather station network along with a range of models and decision aids. The weather data, advisories, weather data products and decision support systems provided by AgWeatherNet and WSU can help improve production and product quality, optimize resource use and reduce environmental impact.

== Student life ==
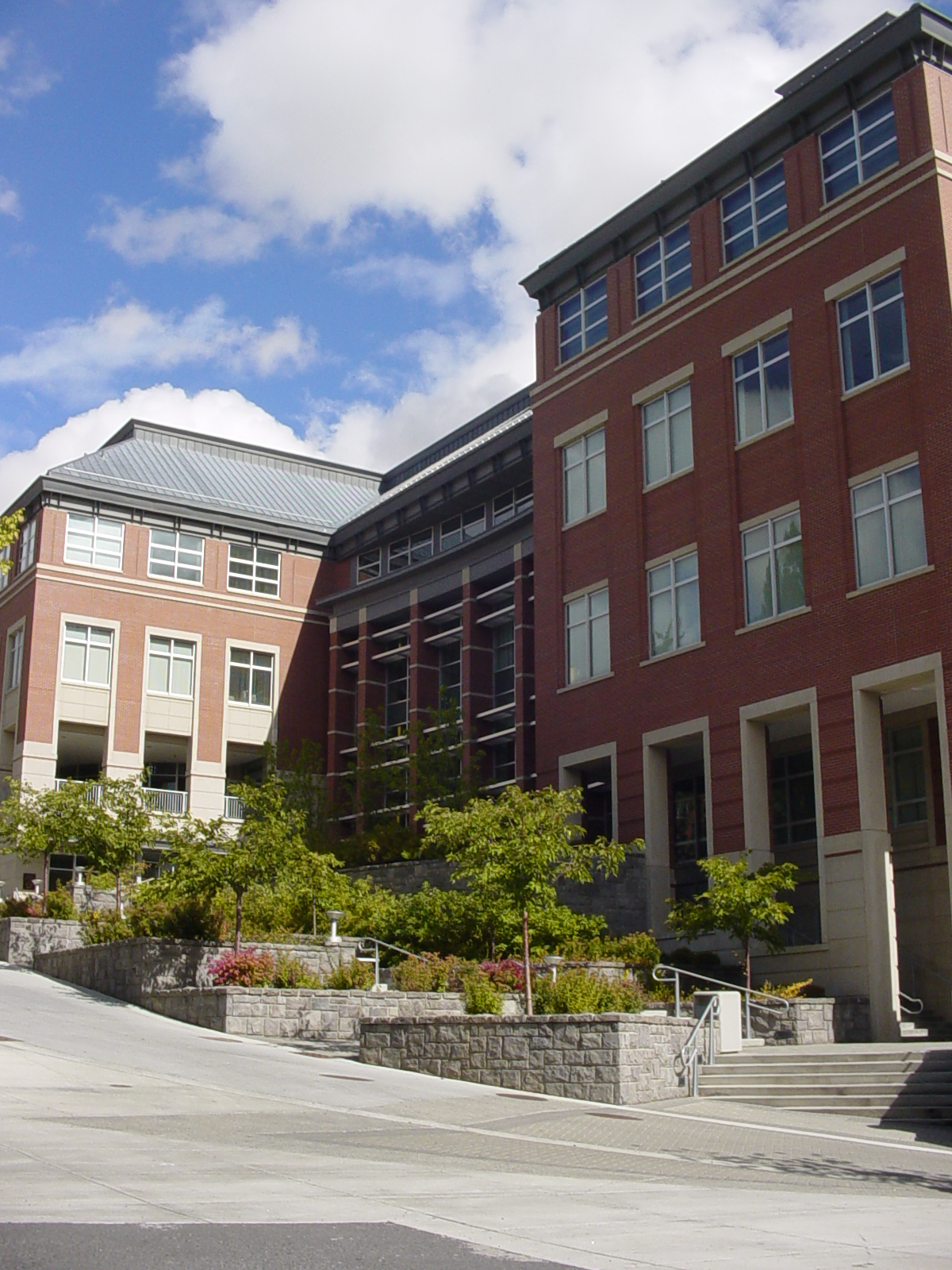
The Center for Undergraduate Education

Undergraduate demographics as of Fall 2023
Race and ethnicity	Total
White	59%
Hispanic	17%
Two or more races	8%
Asian	7%
Black	3%
International student	3%
Unknown	2%
American Indian/Alaska Native	1%
Native Hawaiian/Pacific Islander	1%
Economic diversity
Low-income (Note: The percentage of students who received an income-based federal Pell grant intended for low-income students.)	27%
Affluent (Note: The percentage of students who are a part of the American middle class at the bare minimum.)	73%

Student life on WSU's Pullman campus is influenced by a variety of student organizations and their committees. Open to all students, they create educational, entertaining and cultural programming for WSU students and the local community. Committees include Asian Pacific American Student Coalition (APASC), Black Student Union (BSU), Environmental Sustainability Alliance (ESA), Gender and Sexuality Alliance (GSA), International Students' Council (ISC), Ku Ah Mah, KZUU Radio, Middle Eastern Students Association (MESA), Movimiento Estudianti Chicano de Aztian (MEChA), Student Legal Services (SLS), Veteran's Student Committee, and GIVE on the Pullman Campus. There are also more than 350 registered student organizations (RSOs) that cover many interests. All ASWSU committees are members of "Committee Squared," the coalition of all ASWSU Committee leaders. ASWSU also consists of the President and Vice President who oversee the Executive Staff. The staff consists of a variety of directors and assistant directors advancing student causes via student life, diversity affairs, campus life, and others. The 23-member Senate represents students via academic colleges as well as the Honors College and Freshman class. The Senate meets weekly to debate legislation, hear reports from the Executive Staff, and appoint the various officers of ASWSU. The Senate also provides financial support to the nearly 400 registered student organizations on campus via the Senate Finance Committee. Finally, the Election Board and the Judicial Board complete the association.

There are several other influential student organizations. Interfraternity Council, Panhellenic Council, the United Greek Council, and the National Pan-Hellenic Council are governmental bodies for university-recognized Greek social organizations. The Residence Hall Association is a government body for students in the residence halls, governing all of the residence halls on campus excluding McEachern and Stimson Halls. It is the second biggest registered student organization at Washington State, representing about 4,700 on-campus resident students.

The board of directors of the Students' Book Corporation has a total of nine directors. Five are students at WSU, two are faculty and two are administrative directors. These people oversees the non-profit campus bookstore separate from WSU. The Students' Book Corporation provides a 10% point of sale discount. On average the dividend total has been about $85,000. This is then received at ASWSU organizations at each campus to be distributed to various groups and activities. The Compton Union Board (CUB) oversees the management of the student union building and its services. The University Recreation Board oversees the management of university recreation. The Student Alumni Connection hosts several major campus events.

The Student Entertainment Board (SEB) is a student-led board composed of undergraduate students. Positions on the board include: Spotlight, Films, Up All Night, Lectures, CUB Gallery, Concerts, VPLAC (Visual, Performing, and Literary Arts Committee), Special Event (Homecoming and Springfest), associate director, and Director. They are responsible for bringing diverse arts & entertainment to campus.

The Coalition for Women Students provides much of the multicultural programs on campus, including the annual minority women symposium, the Week Without Violence, and Take Back the Night rally and march. CWS is made up of Association for Pacific and Asian Women, Black Women's Caucus, Mujeres Unidas, Native American Women's Association, and the YWCA of WSU. The organization also funds the all-volunteer Women's Transit, a safe door-to-door transportation program for women who would otherwise walk alone at night.

=== Student government ===
WSU has two representative student body organizations: the Associated Students of Washington State University (ASWSU) founded in 1915 and the Graduate and Professional Students Association (GPSA) founded about 1970.

In recent years, the student body completed several major projects on campus. In addition to passing a $15 transportation fee to increase Pullman Transit's service, the student body also voted to remodel the Compton Union Building. The building closed in May 2006 and re-opened in August 2008. In March 2006, ASWSU voted to support the renovation of Martin Stadium, adding $25 per semester to undergraduate student fees.

==== Associated Students of Washington State University ====
ASWSU's organizational framework is similar to that of most American governments complete with an appointed and confirmed judiciary, elected representatives (from districts) to a senate, and an annually elected president and vice-president team. The president also has a paid staff led by the chief of staff ranging in size from 6–12 members, depending on the year.

==== Graduate and Professional Students Association ====
GPSA is similar, but differs in that it lacks a judiciary or a paid staff. The GPSA is centered on the senate which is composed of a large number of senators that represent different graduate and professional programs. The GPSA also has an executive Council that consists of the (GPSA) President, vice-presidents, and nine District Representatives elected from the nine colleges of WSU.

=== Media ===
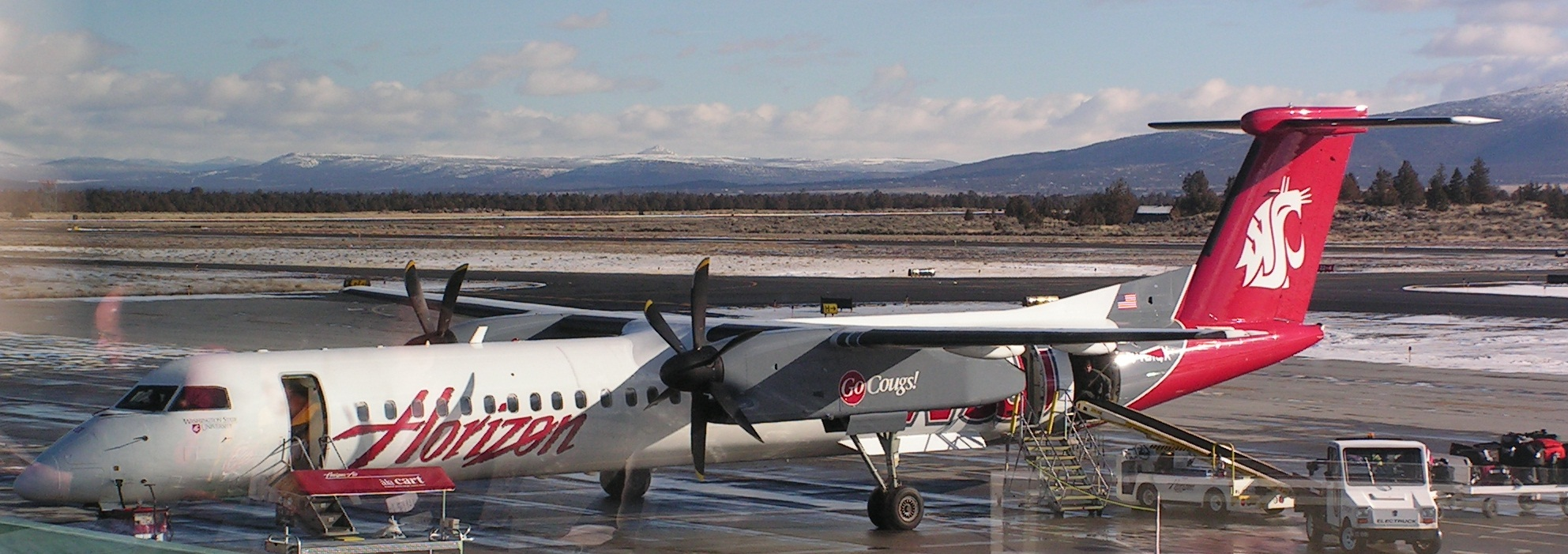
Horizon Air Q400 in unique WSU livery

Washington State Magazine is the alumni and research magazine of Washington State University. Published quarterly, the magazine covers news and issues of interest to Washington State University faculty, staff, students, alumni, and the people of Washington. The magazine was first published in 2001. Before Washington State Magazine, WSU alumni news was published in HillTopics from 1969 to 2000, and The PowWow, the alumni magazine from 1910 to 1969. Research news at the university appeared in Universe magazine in the 1990s.

WSU News is the university's official news website and daily e-newsletter for faculty, staff and graduate students.

The Daily Evergreen is Washington State University's student newspaper. The first issue of the Evergreen was published in 1895.

WSU broadcast media include Northwest Public Radio and Television, the network of public radio and television stations in the Northwest owned and operated by Washington State University. NWPR's flagship station—KWSU 1250 in Pullman—signed on December 10, 1922, as KFAE, became KWSC in 1925, and then KWSU in the 1960s. WSU alumnus Edward R. Murrow got his start in radio at KWSC.

Cable 8 Productions is a local student-operated cable TV channel serving WSU and the Pullman-Moscow area. KZUU 90.7 FM, a non-commercial college radio station, is a service of ASWSU. It gained FCC approval in 1979. KUGR Sports Rock is a student-operated, online radio station. Among the students who operate these media are broadcasting students in WSU's Edward R. Murrow College of Communication.

=== Song ===
"The Fight Song" is the school's fight song. It was composed in 1919 by students Phyllis Sayles and lyrics were written by Zella Melcher, as a class project.

The lyrics are found on the Washington State University visitor website.

Additionally, Washington State has embraced Andy Grammer's "Back Home" in recent years, featured prominently during sporting events and appearing on merchandise sold by the university.

== Athletics ==
Washington State University is a member of the Pac-12 Conference. During the Pac-12's de facto hiatus from 2024 to 2026, most WSU sports compete in the West Coast Conference. Baseball and women's swimming & diving compete in the Mountain West Conference. Men's and women's indoor track & field, which the Pac-12 did not sponsor before its 2024 collapse, compete in the Mountain Pacific Sports Federation. The school's mascot is "Butch T. Cougar" and the school's colors are crimson and gray. Varsity athletics include men's baseball, basketball, cross country, football, golf, and track and field, as well as women's basketball, cross country, golf, rowing, soccer, swimming, volleyball, tennis, and track and field. In the past WSU had varsity programs of boxing, wrestling, gymnastics, and men's swimming. In 1917, WSU won its first national championship in men's basketball. In 1937, Roy Petragallo and Ed McKinnon won the NCAA boxing championship, another national championship. The Cougars third and most recent national championship was earned in 1977 in indoor track and field.

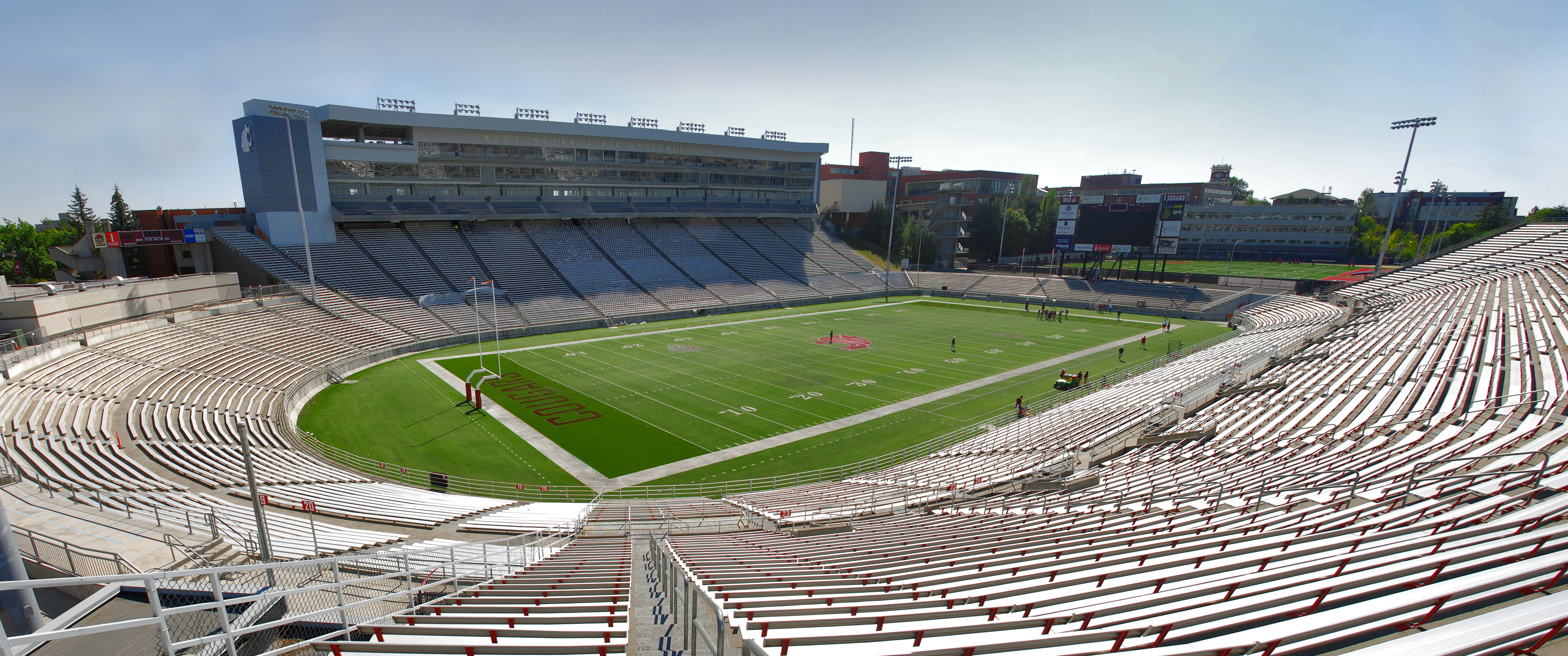
Martin Stadium in 2012, home of Cougar football

University Recreation also supports 26 club sports, including bowling, men's crew, cricket, cycling, equestrian show team, men's and women's flag football, fencing, polo, men's and women's ice hockey, judo, men's lacrosse, logger sports, rodeo, men's rugby union, women's rugby, sailing, ski team, men's soccer, women's fast-pitch softball, taekwondo, triathlon, Ultimate, men's and women's volleyball, water polo and wrestling.

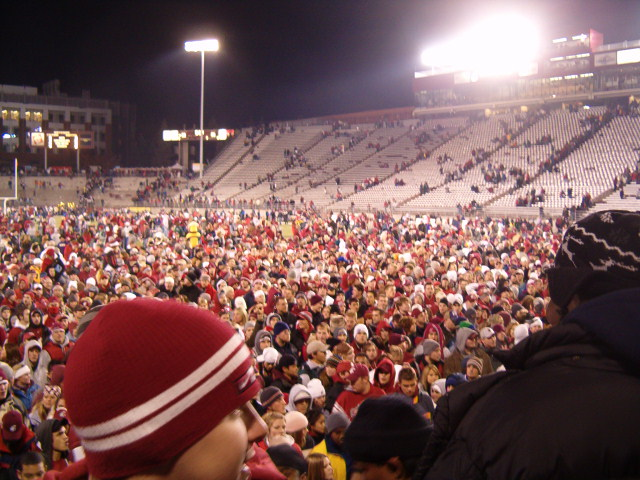
Cougar fans celebrate after the Apple Cup win in 2004

Washington State's biggest rival is the University of Washington Huskies. Strong rivalries also exist between WSU and the other Pac-12 teams of the Pacific Northwest: the University of Oregon Ducks and Oregon State University Beavers. WSU's closest geographic rival is the University of Idaho Vandals, a fellow land-grant school only seven miles (11 km) east of Pullman across the state line in Moscow. Conference rivals until 1959, their rivalry football game, the "Battle of the Palouse", was played on an annual basis from 1901 until 1978 when the NCAA Division I split. After Idaho returned to Division I-A, a renewed series lasted a decade, from 1998 until 2007. The renewed series was dropped from the schedule due to the Cougars' continued dominance of the Vandals in the series, and each school's ability to generate more revenue by playing other opponents. Vandal head coach Robb Akey, a former WSU defensive coordinator, preferred the game as an occasional rather regular attraction. On hiatus for five seasons, it returned for one year in 2013.

== Notable alumni and faculty ==
The university has 196,257 living alumni in fall 2015, according to WSU Quick Facts.

Among the 39 WSU alumni to receive the Regents' Distinguished Alumnus Award since 1962 are recipient of the 2004 Nobel Prize in Chemistry Irwin Rose (attended one year, graduated University of Chicago), broadcaster Edward R. Murrow, journalist Ana Cabrera, Microsoft co-founder Paul Allen (dropped out), astronaut John M. Fabian, cartoonist Gary Larson, action movie star Dolph Lundgren (attended one year), molecular evolutionist Allan Wilson (Master's degree), banking executive Phyllis J. Campbell, painter and pioneer of Abstract Expressionism Clyfford Still (Master's degree), Canadian Football League player and champion George Reed, Entrepreneur Clint Hedin, sociologist William Julius Wilson (PhD), author and film director Sherman Alexie (attended), veterinary researcher John Gorham, wheat breeder Orville Vogel (not a student), physicist Philip Abelson, and physician Neva Abelson. Donald Allen Duncan, who managed Washington State's Varsity swim team in 1950, became Head Coach at Puget Sound University from 1957 to 1994 where he led the team to a notable record of 307 wins and 127 losses.

1984 Olympic gold medalist in men's double sculls, Paul Enquist, started his rowing career at Washington State. Olympic marathon and middle-distance runner Bernard Lagat, ran NCAA track and graduated from Washington State University with a degree in management information systems 2000.

Medal of Honor recipients Colonel James P. Fleming and Staff Sergeant Ronald Shurer are both Washington State University alumni. Colonel Fleming entered the Air Force after receiving his commission through ROTC at Washington State in 1966. Staff Sergeant Shurer attended Washington State from 1997 to 2002 earning a bachelor's degree in business administration and starting an MBA before enlisting in the US Army.

Counterculture icon Timothy Leary received a graduate degree from Washington State in the mid-1940s.

Musician Krist Novoselic earned a BSc in social sciences from Washington State University Global Campus in 2016.

Basketball player Klay Thompson attended Washington State University from 2008 to 2011. He was drafted 11th overall in the 2011 NBA draft and won four championships with the Golden State Warriors.

Edmund Schweitzer, founder of Schweitzer Engineering Laboratories (SEL), graduated with his Ph.D. from Washington State in 1977. He received the IEEE Medal in Power Engineering in 2012, and was inducted into the National Inventors Hall of Fame in 2019.

== See also ==
- List of business schools in the United States
- List of cheesemakers
- List of forestry universities and colleges
- List of nursing schools in the United States
- List of pharmacy schools
- List of schools of veterinary medicine
