= Enoch Albert Bryan =

American academic administrator

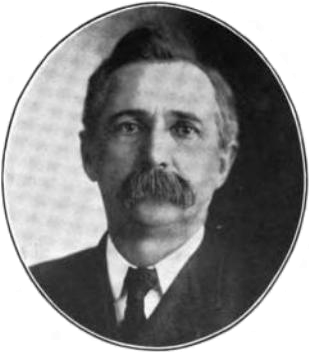

President of the State College of Washington
- In office 1893–1915

President of Vincennes University
- In office 1883–1893

Personal details
- Born: May 10, 1855 Bloomington, Indiana
- Died: November 6, 1941 (aged 86) Pullman, Washington
- Spouse: Harriet Williams (m. 1881; died 1935)
- Children: 4
- Relatives: William Lowe Bryan (brother)
- Education: Indiana University; Harvard University

Enoch Albert Bryan (May 10, 1855 – November 6, 1941) was president of Vincennes University in Indiana from 1883 to 1893 and of Washington's land-grant institution, today called Washington State University, from 1893 to 1915. At the latter institution he was the third president but the first with a long tenure, following George Lilly, 1891–1892, and John W. Heston, 1892–1893.

== Early life and education ==
Bryan was born on May 10, 1855, in Bloomington, Indiana, the son of Reverend John Bryan, a Presbyterian minister, and Eliza Jane Phillips Bryan. Rev. Bryan had come to serve a Bloomington congregation on a supply basis in January 1855, then received a call to the pastorate there and was installed in September 1855.

Enoch was educated at home and in the public schools. He then studied in the classical course at Indiana University Bloomington, earning an A.B. degree in 1878 and an A.M. degree in 1884. In 1893, he earned an A.M. degree in classical studies from Harvard University. He was the recipient of honorary Doctor of Law degrees from Monmouth College (1902), Michigan State University (1907), Indiana University (1920), and Washington State University (1929).

== Career ==
Bryan was Superintendent of Public Schools in Grayville, Illinois, for three years before becoming professor of Latin and Greek at Vincennes in 1882, and taking the presidency in 1883. Founded in 1801, the university in Vincennes, Indiana, had twelve faculty members in 1891. Among them was William Jasper Spillman, a botany and physics instructor. Bryan later invited him to join the faculty at his next institution, known in its early years as the Washington Agricultural College and School of Science.

Bryan arrived at Washington's fledgling land-grant institution in 1893, three years after its founding by the Washington Legislature and one year after it opened its doors in Pullman, a town in the fertile agricultural region of Eastern Washington called the Palouse. By 1894, he had built up a faculty of fourteen in fields at diverse as English, botany, chemistry, physics, zoology, agriculture, horticulture, and civil and mechanical engineering. Bryan himself was professor of history and political science as well as president and director of the Experiment Station.

He set a clear academic direction for the young institution, combining liberal education and practical education, one that continues to this day. In 1905, he gained legislative approval to change the name to Washington State College to match its breadth of studies. In 1915, he served as president of the Association of Land Grant Colleges and Universities, capping his Washington State College presidency that concluded December 31, 1915.

Assessing Bryan's influence, WSU history professor George A. Frykman wrote in a WSU centennial history volume: "When Bryan presided over his final Commencement in June 1915, the impressive numbers of teachers and graduates strongly suggest that the State College of Washington had a bright future."

Bryan's service to Washington State University was recognized on May 12, 1916, when the Board of Regents dedicated the new library and assembly hall as Bryan Hall in honor of Dr. E.A. Bryan, president emeritus. Today the building with its prominent clock tower is the best known symbol of the WSU main campus.

His service was recognized again on December 31, 1970, when the United States Congress approved the designation of the lake behind Little Goose Dam on the Snake River as "Lake Bryan" in honor of the late Doctor Enoch A. Bryan.

After leaving the presidency, he became the Commissioner of Education for the State of Idaho, serving from 1917 to 1923. He then returned to Washington State, serving as a professor of economic history until 1939, when he became a professor emeritus. Bryan was the author of three books: The Mark in Europe and America (1893), The History of the State College of Washington (1928), and Orient Meets Occident or The Advent of the Railways into the Pacific Northwest (1936).

== Personal ==
On May 12, 1881, Enoch A. Bryan married Harriet "Hattie" Williams of Grayville, Illinois, who was born March 10, 1856. They had four children: Bertha E. (1882–1900), Arthur William, Eliza and Gertrude. Enoch's brother, William Lowe Bryan, was president of Indiana University, 1902–1937. Other siblings were Jennie Bryan and Joseph Bryan.

Enoch A. Bryan died in Pullman, Washington, on November 6, 1941. He was buried on November 8, 1941, in the Fairmount Cemetery in Pullman, in the lot with daughter Bertha who died in 1900 and wife Hattie who died November 26, 1935.
