= Penns Valley =

Coordinates: 40°51′N 77°37′W

Penns Valley, Pennsylvania
- Region
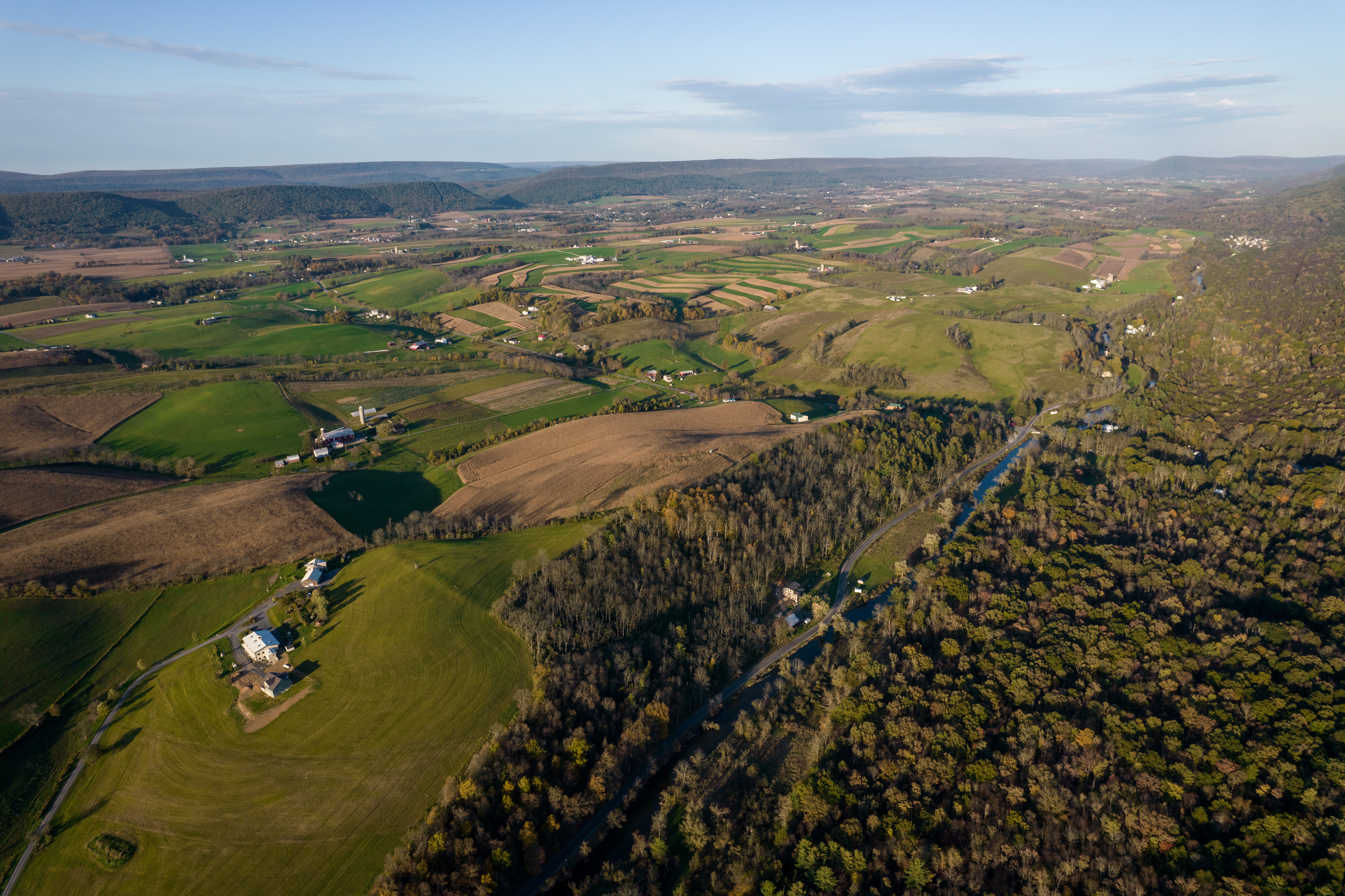
- View of Penns Valley near Penn Township

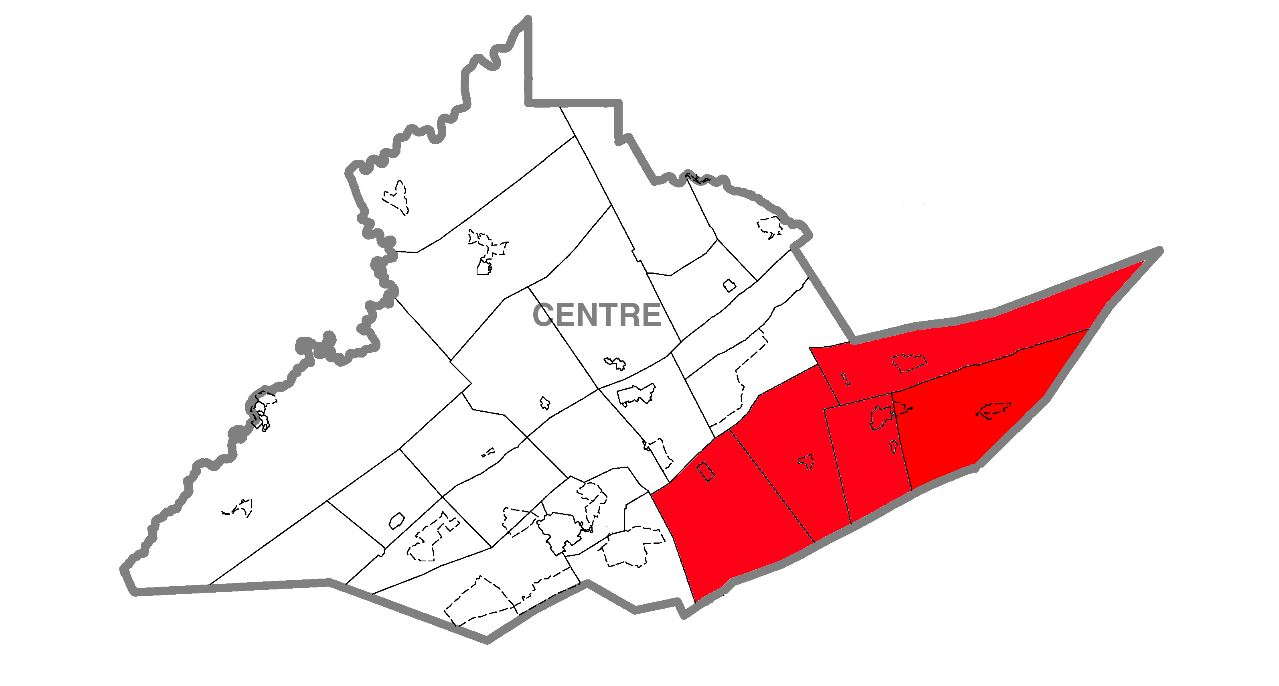
- Penns Valley region of Centre County, Pennsylvania
- Country: United States
- State: Pennsylvania
- County: Centre
- Settled: 1774

Population (2010)
  - Total: 12,819
- Time zone: UTC-5 (Eastern (EST))
  - Summer (DST): UTC-4 (EDT)
- Area code: 814

Penns Valley is an eroded anticlinal valley of the Pennsylvania ridge and valley geologic region of the Appalachian Mountain range. The valley is located in southern Centre County, Pennsylvania. Along with the Nittany Valley to the north and east, it is part of the larger Nittany Anticlinorium. It is bordered by Mount Nittany to the north, the Seven Mountains range to the south, and connects to the larger Nittany Valley to the west. There are two smaller subordinate valleys typically associated with the greater valley: Georges Valley in the south, separated by Egg Hill, and Brush Valley in the north, separated by Brush Mountain.

== History ==
The Appalachian Mountain chain was formed starting around 420 million years ago with the collision of the North American craton and the Iapetus Ocean and culminating with the collision of the modern-day eastern seaboard of the then Euramerican continent with Africa, then Gondwana, about 290 million years ago forming the supercontinent Pangea. Since the collision event the mountains have been eroding from the breakup of Pangea and through sedimentation formed the coastal plains to the east and limestone plateaus to the west. The footprints of the mountains formed the ridge and valley geological region in which Penns Valley was formed through glacial and other activity.

More recently the area now known as Penns Valley was explored by General James Potter in 1764 who trekked through the region and observed the prairies and woodlands of the area and settled at Old Fort, near Centre Hall, in 1774. Upon observing the valley from above he exclaimed, "... I have discovered an empire." Penns Valley also hosts the oldest town of Centre County, Aaronsburg, which was planned out in 1786. At the close of the 18th century Penns Valley was already set aside for farmland, however, the surrounding county rapidly boomed as iron ore was discovered and the first road built by Philadelphia land speculator Reuben Haines brought the rest of Pennsylvania into the heart of Penns Valley terminating at the location of Spring Mills.

In the following two hundred years the iron industry would wane, but the agricultural heritage within Penns Valley would continue, and with the growth of a small land grant university just to the west in State College, The Pennsylvania State University would give the region a new academic wave of prosperity for the 21st century.

== Geography ==
=== Water ===
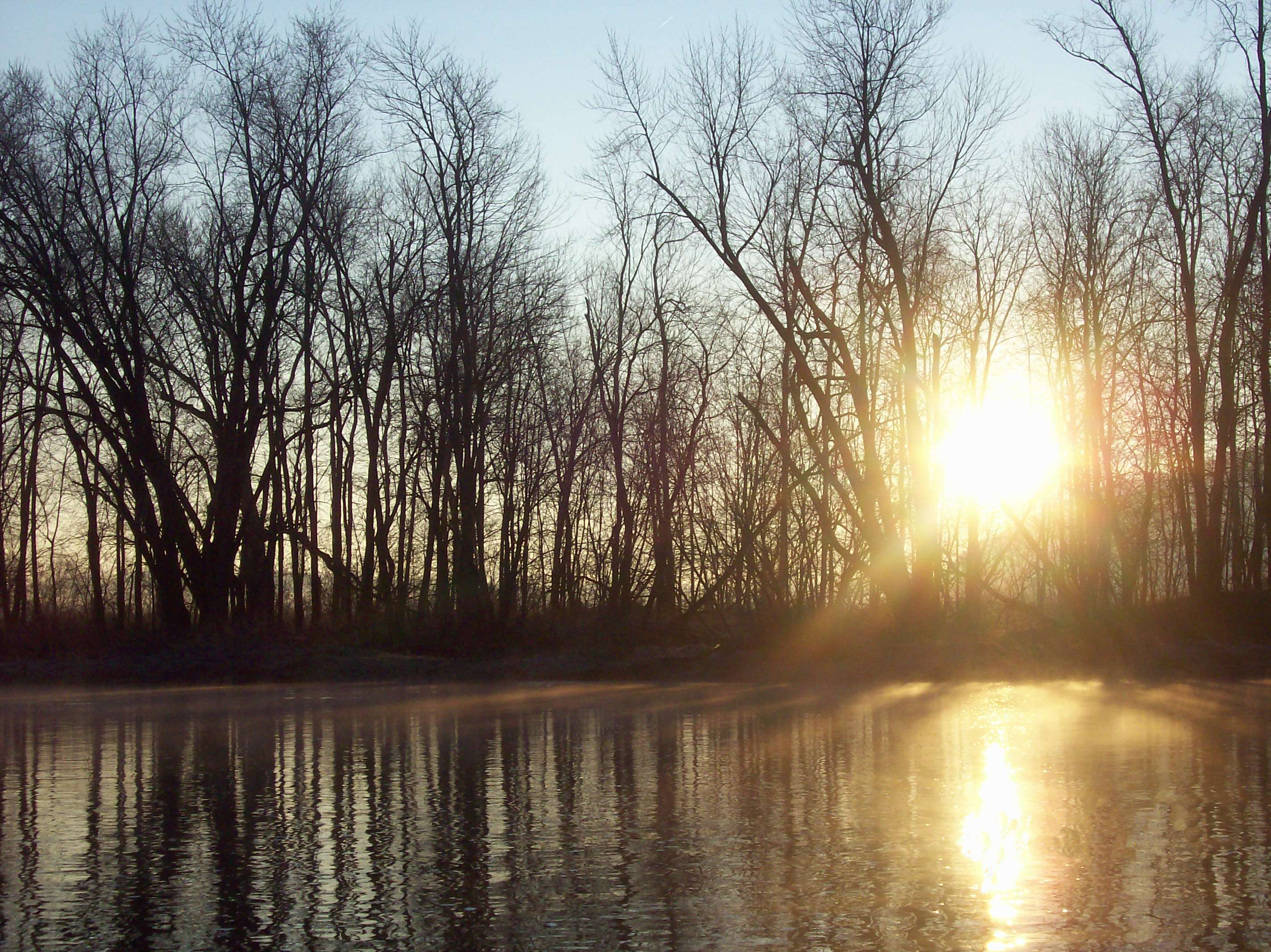
Sunrise as seen from Penns Creek

The Penns Valley region is part of the Chesapeake watershed. The main waterway in the area is Penns Creek whose headwaters are located south of Centre Hall in Penns Cave. It travels downstream linking with Sinking Creek in Spring Mills and flows to the town of Coburn. There it joins Elk Creek whose headwaters are in eastern Brush valley. From Coburn, it flows through the Seven Mountains and into Union County.

There are also two lakes within Penns Valley, each which are controlled by dams: Poe Lake and Colyer Lake. Being fed by Sinking Creek, Colyer Lake is located on the western boundary of Penns Valley and has a surface area of 77 acres. Boating and fishing are permitted and as part of the Cooperative Fish Habitat Improvement Program through the Pennsylvania Fish and Boat Commission, the lake has been host to fish habitat structures to support fish populations. As of March 2013 Colyer Lake has been slated for indefinite draining until deficiencies in the dam can be resolved. Poe Lake is a 25-acre lake at the southern boundary of Penns Valley. The lake is located in Poe Valley State Park which, in turn, is surrounded by 198,000 acre Bald Eagle State Forest. The lake itself was named for the Big Poe Creek which feeds the reservoir. Access to the reservoir and the reservoir's dam were both constructed by the CCC in the mid to late 1930s, specifically with the dam being completed in 1937.

=== Mountains ===
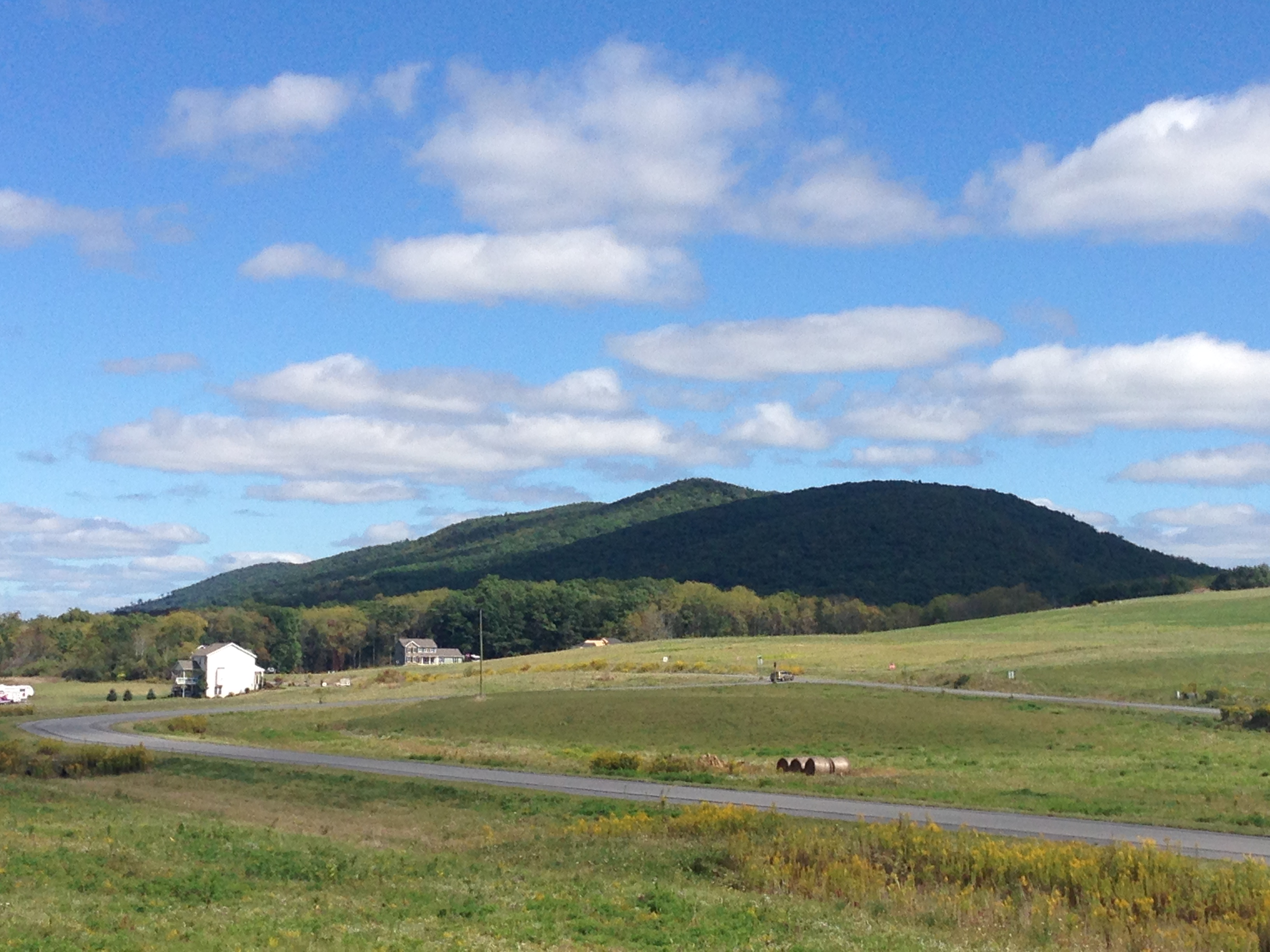
Egg Hill in Pennsylvania as seen from PA Route 45

Nittany Mountain is part of a synclinal depression of the anticlinal Nittany Arch, which originally formed a huge mountain, that has since eroded, during the Appalachian orogeny. Topped by erosion resistant sandstone the mountain forms a barrier between Penns Valley, and Brush Valley, to the south and Nittany Valley to the north.

The southern mountainous border of Penns Valley is created by Tussey Mountain which is one of the stratigraphic ridges of central Pennsylvania. Tussey Mountain is one of the longest running mountains of the Ridge and Valley complex starting in Flintstone, Maryland and running 80 miles into the Seven Mountains of central Pennsylvania.

Egg Hill is a mountain separating greater Penns Valley from the subordinate Georges Valley. Rising to 1,955 ft., Egg Hill is located on the western border of Spring Mills and in the center of greater Penns Valley along PA 45.

As Egg Hill separates Georges Valley from Penns Valley so too does Brush Mountain from Brush Valley. Brush Mountain raises to an elevation of 1,936 ft and has one large pass, the Millheim Narrows, cut by Elk Creek. This pass allows travel from Rebersburg to Millheim and greater Penns Valley.

=== Caves ===
Penns Valley is host to two major public limestone caves.

Penn's Cave, located just east of Centre Hall, is an all water limestone cave and wildlife center unique in the United States. For centuries the few dry rooms above the water were used as shelter by Native Americans and European trappers; in 1885 the cave was officially opened as a show cavern and the nearby Penn's Cave Hotel was opened the same year. On its 91st anniversary in 1976 both the cave and hotel were placed on the National Register of Historic Places. The cave is accessed by guided boat tours through the cavern.

The second public cave in Penns Valley is Woodward Cave. Located in the village of Woodward, Woodward cave is one of the largest in the state featuring the 14-foot Tower of Babel stalagmite, 60-foot cathedral ceiling in the Upper Room, the ballroom which is large enough to host banquets, and the 200-foot-long Hall of Statues. This solution limestone cave can be toured in 50 minutes and has both cabin rentals and campground facilities.

== Municipalities ==
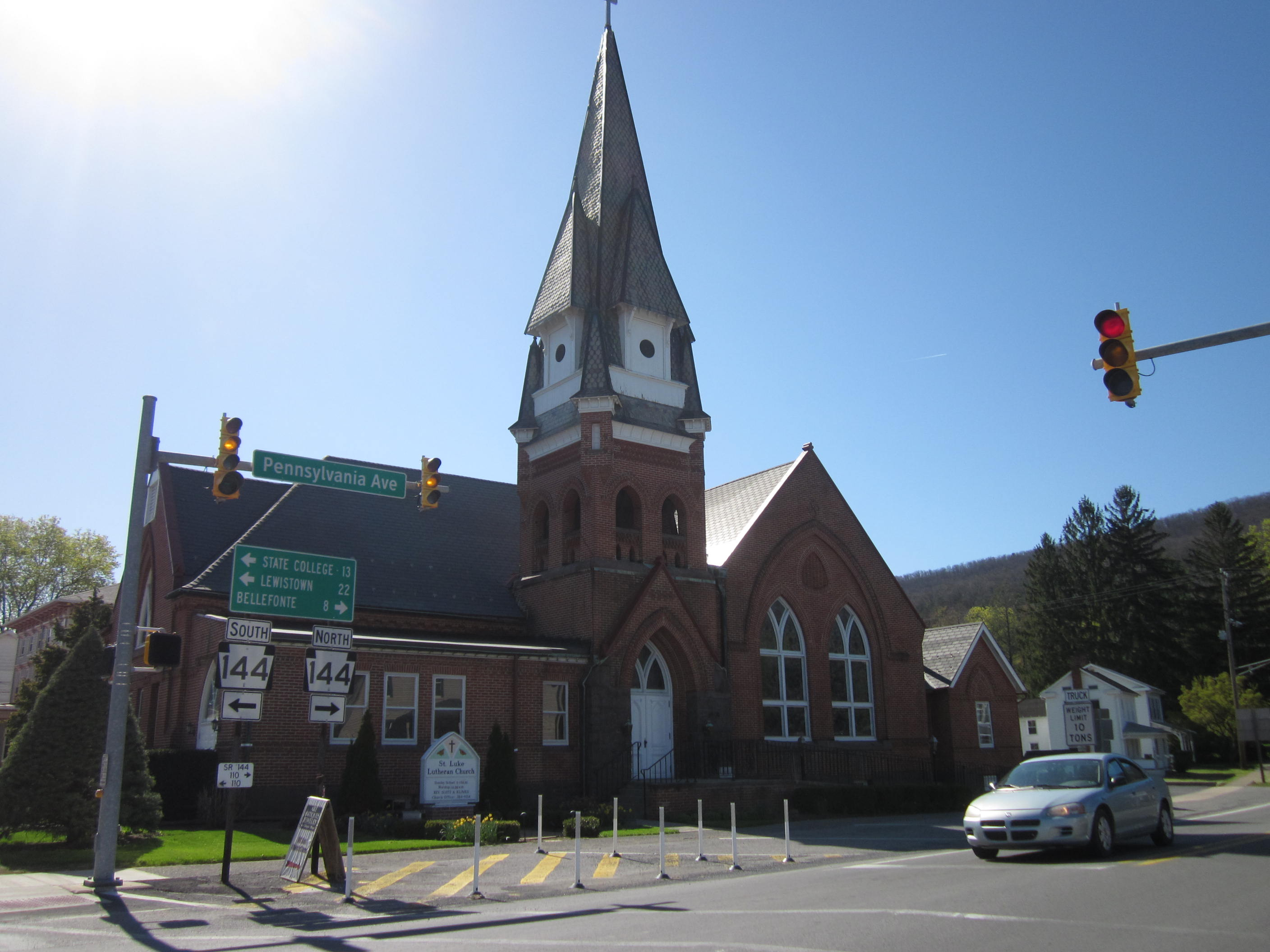
St. Luke Lutheran Church in Centre Hall

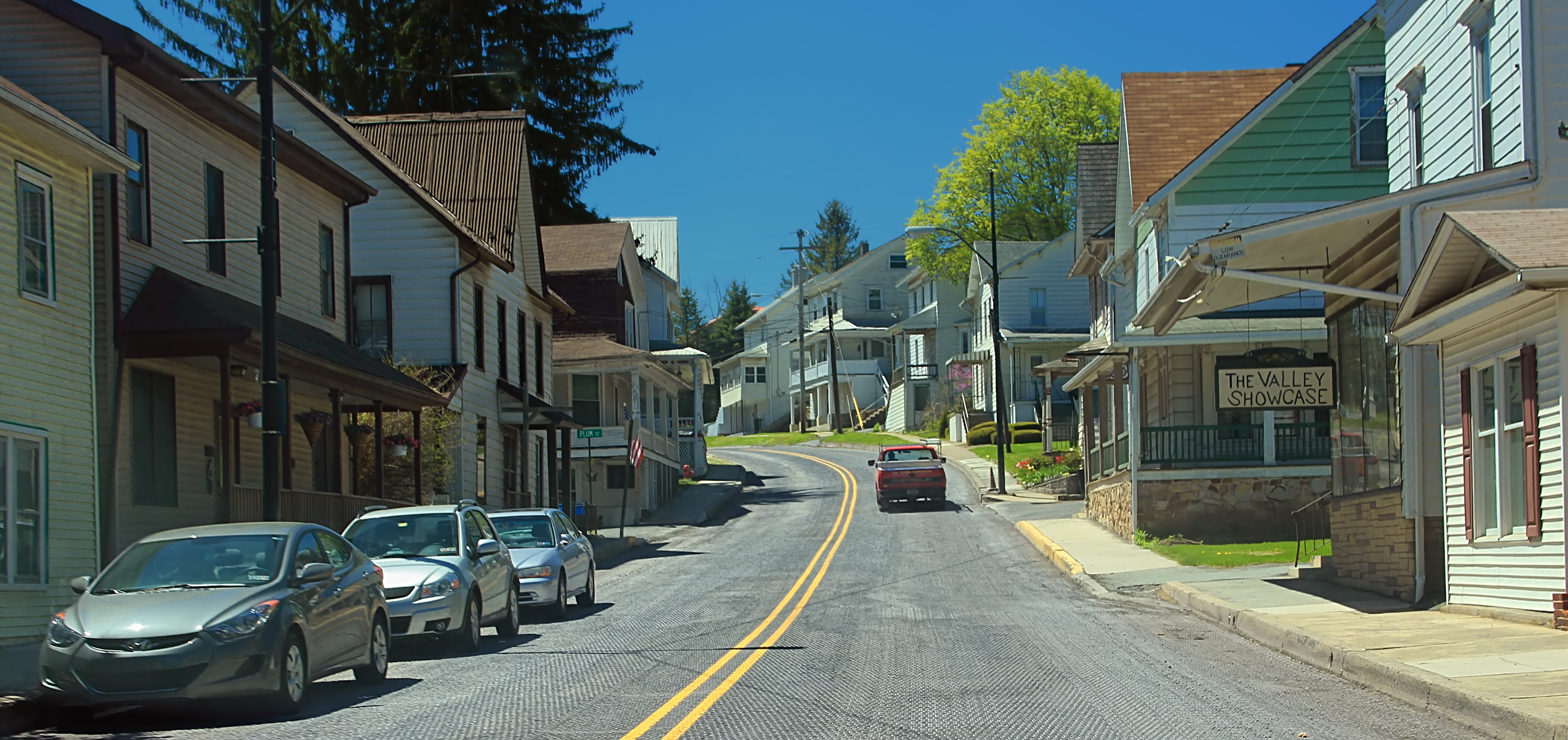
Main Street in Millheim

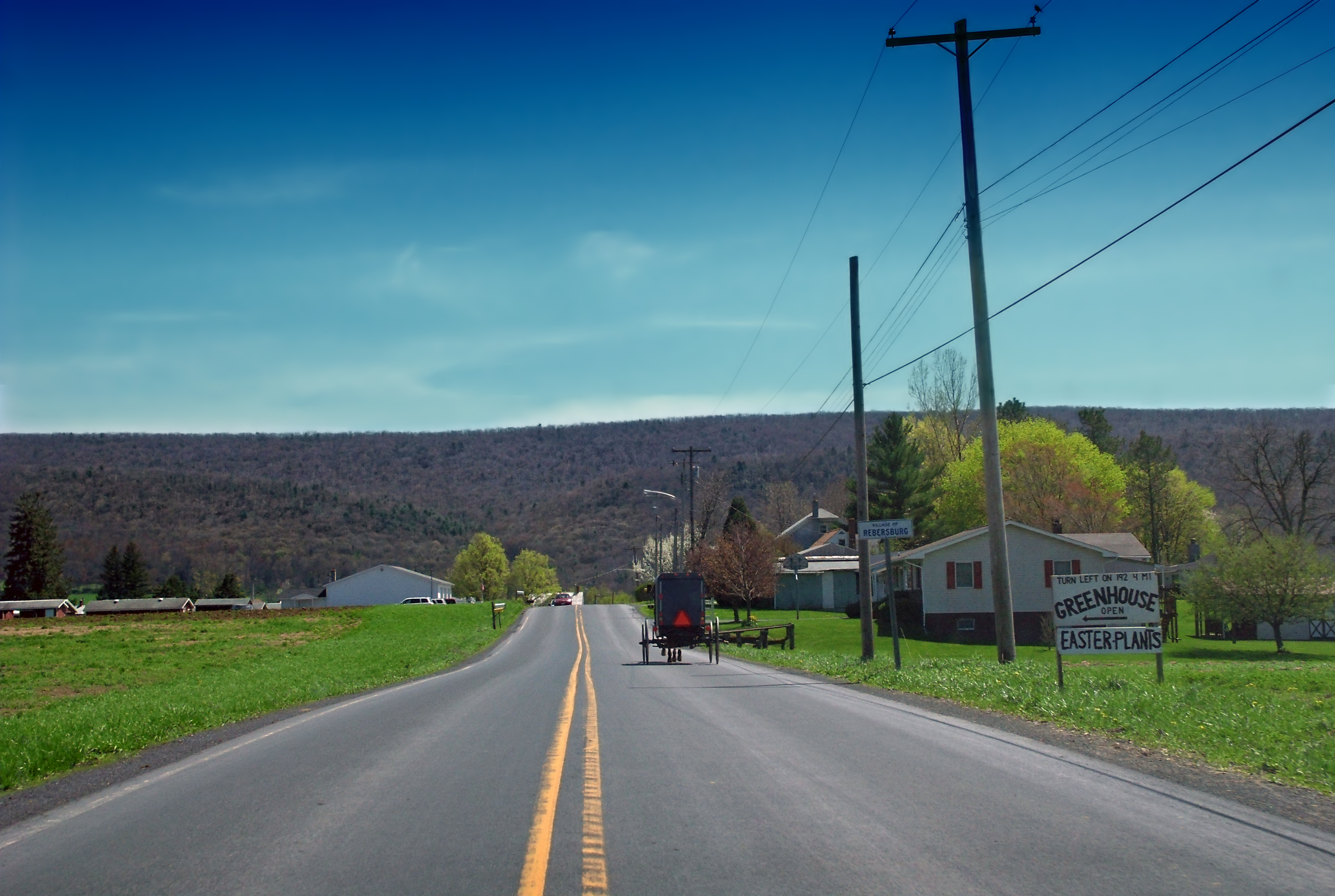
Amish buggy heading into Rebersburg

Under Pennsylvania law, there are five types of incorporated municipalities: cities, home rule municipalities, boroughs, townships, and towns. The following municipalities, boroughs and townships are located in Penns Valley:

=== Boroughs ===
- Centre Hall
- Millheim

=== Townships ===
- Gregg Township
- Haines Township
- Miles Township
- Penn Township
- Potter Township

=== Census-designated places ===
Census-designated places are geographical areas designated by the U.S. Census Bureau for the purposes of compiling demographic data. They are not actual jurisdictions under Pennsylvania law. Other unincorporated communities, such as villages, may be listed here as well.

- Aaronsburg
- Coburn
- Madisonburg
- Rebersburg
- Spring Mills
- Woodward

==== Unincorporated villages ====
- Colyer
- Ingleby
- Farmers Mills
- Old Fort
- Penn Hall
- Potters Mills
- Tusseyville

== Demographics ==
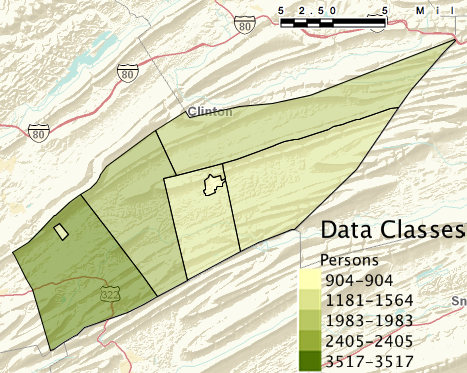
2010 demographics of Penns Valley

As of the 2010 census, the Penns Valley area had 12,819 people living in the area. The most populous municipality is Potter Township with 3,517 people followed by 2,405 people living in Gregg Township, 1,983 people living in Miles Township, 1,564 people living in Haines Township, and 1,181 people living in Penn Township. There were 1,265 people living in Centre Hall borough and 904 people in Millheim borough.

== Community organizations ==
The Centre County Grange Encampment and Fair, also known simply as The Grange Fair, is located in Centre Hall and takes place during the final week of August. As a tradition since 1874, The Grange Fair draws thousands of people from across the Central PA region. The fair also acts as the last week of summer for many organizations around Centre County. The fairgrounds also become a city within a town, as fairgoers are able to move-in for the duration of the fair.

The HOPE Fund of Penns Valley is a volunteer, Christian based, non-denominational, non-profit organization created for financially assisting members of the community effected by medical and accidental crises. The HOPE Fund has distributed over $250,000 from 2008 to 2013, and annually hosts many fundraising events throughout the area including festivals and banquets.

The Penns Valley Conservation Association is a non-profit organization that acts as a steward of the Upper Penns Creek watershed. Its purview includes Penns Valley's waters, farmlands, forests, and rural heritage. PVCA also supports and organizes activities fostering local sourcing and environmental awareness.

The Penns Valley Business Network brings together individuals and local businesses interested in professional advancement through the exchange of ideas and information amongst each other. The network joins 16 businesses, ranging from accounting and banking to landscaping and personal care management, in advancing these ideals.

== Education ==
=== Public education ===
The Penns Valley Area School District is a small, rural, public school district serving the southeastern portions of Centre County, Pennsylvania. It encompasses an area of 254.4 square miles (659 km2). Primary education is conducted in three K-4th grade elementary schools; Centre Hall-Potter Township Elementary, Penns Valley Area Elementary, Rebersburg-Miles Township Elementary, and one district-wide combined 5th-6th grade Penns Valley Area Intermediate school operating concurrently with Penns Valley Area Elementary. The district's secondary educational needs are fulfilled by Penns Valley Junior-Senior High School which combines 7th through 12th grades. The district provides vocational education through the Central Pennsylvania Institute of Science and Technology in Pleasant Gap, Pennsylvania.

=== Private education ===
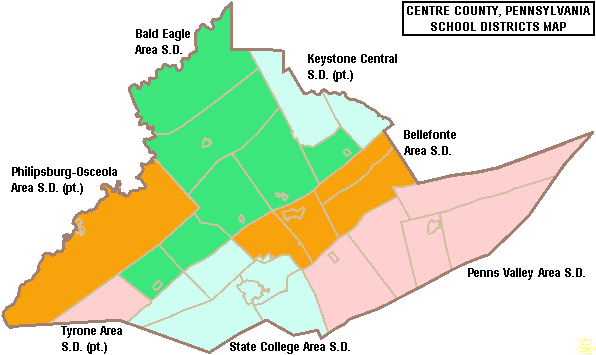

The Penns Valley Region is host to 12 private schools, the most in the county. Many of these schools are operated for the use of the large Amish community within Penns Valley.

- Bower Hollow Parochial School - Woodward
- Elk Creek School - Rebersburg
- Hill Side School - Rebersburg
- Kramer Gap School - Spring Mills
- Mountain View School - Rebersburg
- Peach Lane Amish School - Madisonburg
- Penns Valley Amish Paroch School - Woodward
- Rockville School - Rebersburg
- Spring Bank School - Rebersburg
- Sunset View School - Rebersburg
- Windy Poplars School - Centre Hall
- Woodside Amish School - Spring Mills

=== Libraries ===
The Centre County Libraries has a branch in Centre Hall and operates a bookmobile that provides service to the Penns Valley area. The East Penns Valley Library has been an all volunteer library since 2013 after their split from the Center County Library system.

== Recreation ==
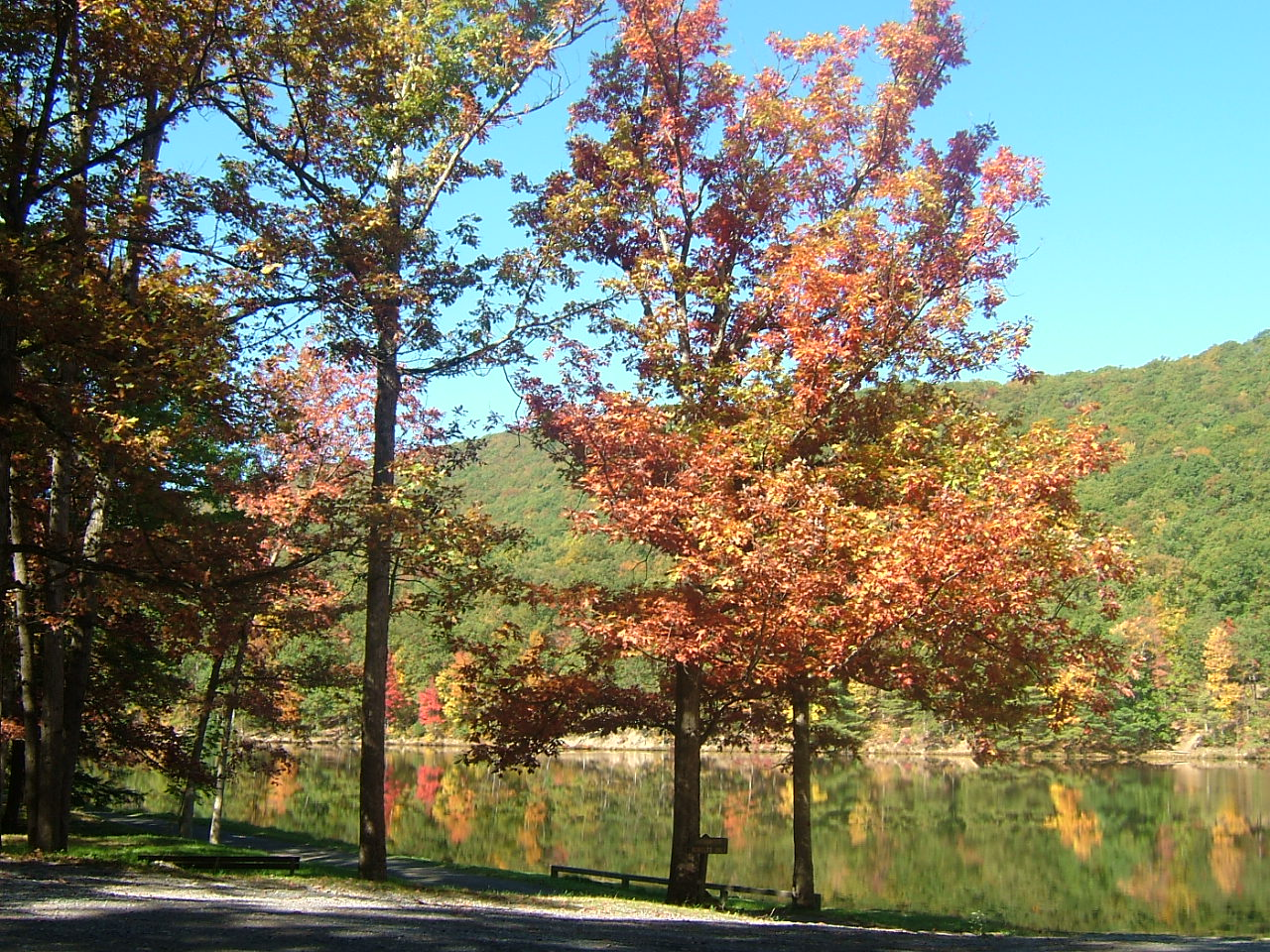
Poe Valley State Park in autumn

Penns Valley is home to two state parks and large tracts of state forest. The state parks, Poe Valley State Park and Poe Paddy State Park are located just minutes from each other. Both parks have extensive hiking trails which link up to the trails of the surrounding and extensive lands of the Bald Eagle State Forest.

Poe Valley State Park is host to Poe Lake which has overnight camping facilities for summer visitors and guided walks, evening amphitheater programs and other special activities are available during the summer months. In the winter roads may by inaccessible but use of registered snowmobiles is allowed.

Poe Paddy State Park is just east and provides access to fishing through Penns Creek. There are also limited camping facilities but they can be supplemented through the use of Poe Valley's amenities.

== Transportation ==
=== Roads ===
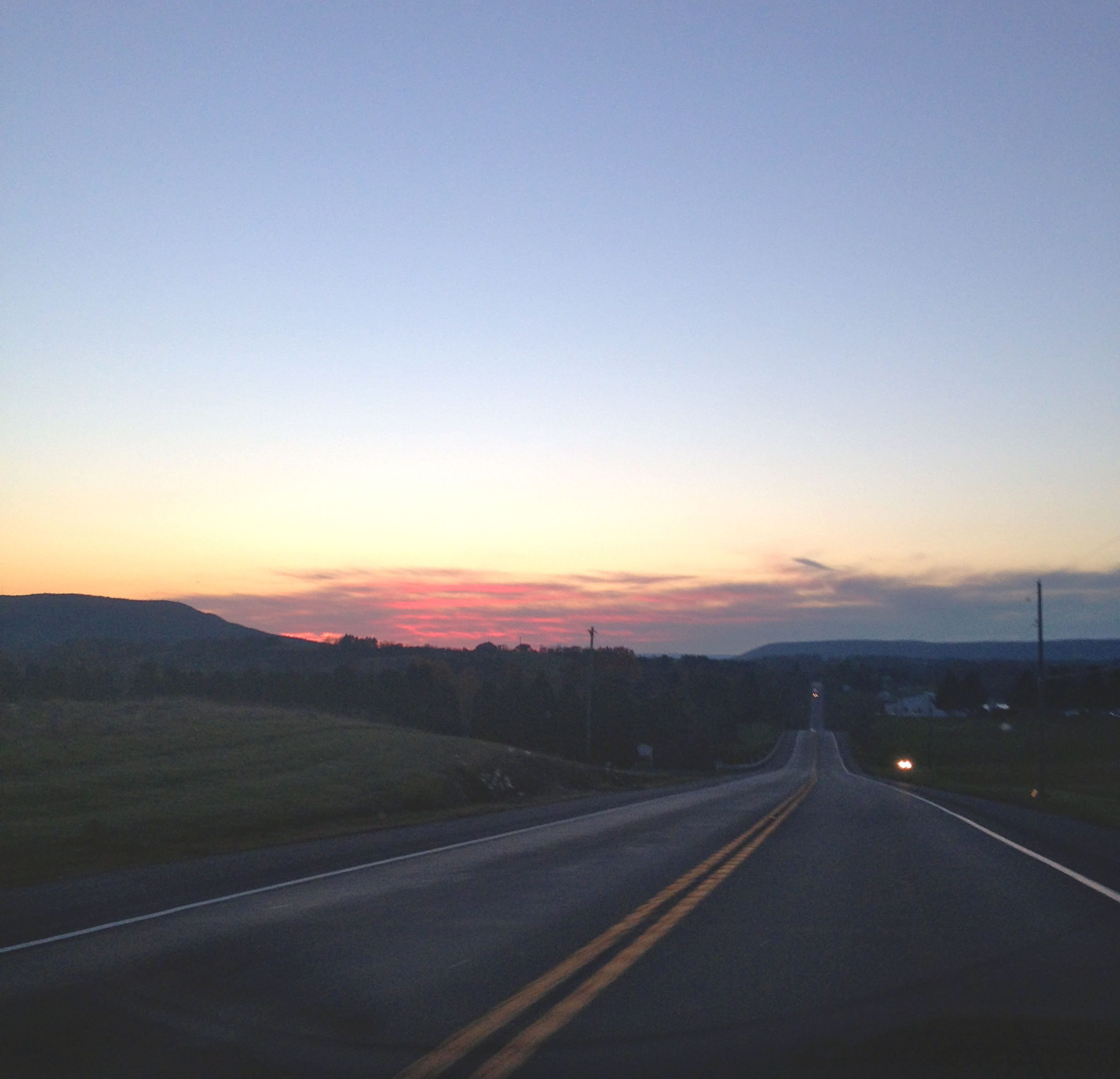
Sunset over U.S. Route 322 north of Potters Mills, Pennsylvania

Penns Valley has three main state routes that connect the valley both within itself and to the surrounding region. PA 144 is a north–south route that begins as a branch from US 322 in Potters Mills running through Centre Hall and crossing Nittany Mountain into Pleasant Gap and the Bellefonte area. PA 192 runs east–west through upper Penns Valley in the subordinate Brush Valley. This route acts as one of two connections from Union County into Centre County and State College. The second of these two routes is PA 45 which runs through the heart of Penns Valley connecting all the townships and boroughs, except Miles Township served by PA 192.

The only U.S. route in the area is US 322 which takes a unique form in Penns Valley as the smaller two-lane General Potter Highway linking the four-lane sections crossing the seven mountains and intersecting State College and Boalsburg. As of June 2013 plans have been proposed to increase this smaller section of US 322 through a Pennsylvania State Senate bill for infrastructure improvement.

=== Air ===
There are two public airfields in Penns Valley. Centre Airpark is a sod 3,100 ft airstrip located approximately two miles south of Centre Hall. It is privately owned and is host to ultralight air shows during the summer months. Penns Cave Airport is an asphalt landing strip 4 miles east of Centre Hall and beside Penns Cave.

The only private airfield in Penns Valley is Pennfield Farm located just west of Spring Mills off PA Route 45.
