= Old Fort, Pennsylvania =

Unincorporated community in Pennsylvania, US

- Unincorporated community
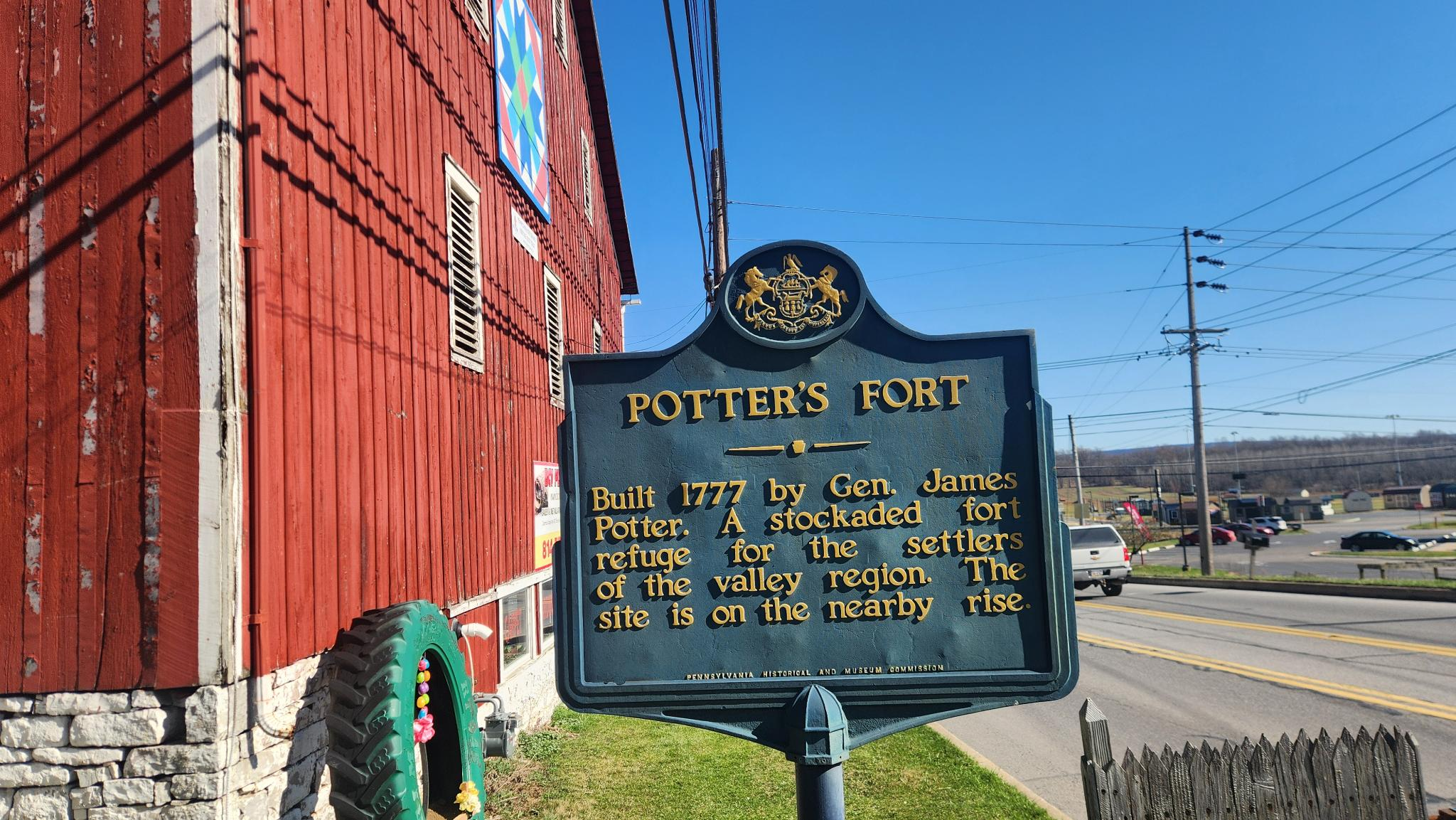
- Potter's Fort Historical Marker on PA-144

- Location within the state of Pennsylvania Old Fort (the United States)
- Coordinates: 40°50′7.23″N 77°40′17.99″W
- Country: United States
- State: Pennsylvania
- County: Centre
- Township: Potter Township
- Elevation: 1,270 ft (390 m)
- Time zone: UTC-5 (Eastern (EST))
  - Summer (DST): UTC-4 (EDT)
- GNIS feature ID: 1204324

Old Fort, formerly known as Potter's Fort, is a hamlet in Potter Township, Centre County, Pennsylvania, United States. It is part of Penns Valley.

== History ==
Potter's Fort was established in 1777 along the Kishacoquillas Path by James Potter, who was among the earliest Europeans settlers in the area. Kishacoquillas is the name of a Shawnee chief which translates to "the snakes are already in their dens." The path runs from present-day Milesburg to Lewistown passing over the Seven Mountains, Mount Nittany, and Bald Eagle Mountain. The difficult terrain made the path a vital choke point for travel and is still in use today as Pennsylvania Route 144 and as a part of U.S. Route 322.

In 1768 the Treaty of Fort Stanwix was signed between the Haudenosaunee, Cherokee, and the Kingdom of Great Britain, establishing the Line of Property, which was the boundary between the colonists and Indigenous peoples. European settlers violated the treaty by establishing illegal settlements along the West Branch Susquehanna River prompting retaliation from the Iroquois Confederacy. In 1778 two American soldiers were attacked a mile east of Potter's Fort as a part of a larger raiding campaign that resulted in the Big Runaway. James Potter abandoned the fort that year and evacuated to Fort Augusta along with the rest of the settlers in Penns Valley and the West Branch Susquehanna Valley.

When Potter returned to Penns Valley he settled further south along the Kishacoquillas Path in what would come to be known as Potters Mills.

A historic marker was erected in 1947.
