= Tusseyville, Pennsylvania =

Unincorporated community in Pennsylvania, US

- Unincorporated community
- Location within the U.S. state of Pennsylvania Tusseyville (the United States)
- Coordinates: 40°47′50″N 77°40′43″W
- Country: United States
- State: Pennsylvania
- County: Centre
- Township: Potter
- Time zone: UTC-5 (Eastern (EST))
  - Summer (DST): UTC-4 (EDT)
- GNIS feature ID: 1189988

Tusseyville is a small unincorporated community in Centre County, Pennsylvania, United States. It is in west-central Potter Township, just north of U.S. Route 322 in the Penns Valley near Centre Hall.
