= Andrew Gregg Homestead =

Historic house in Pennsylvania, United States

- U.S. National Register of Historic Places
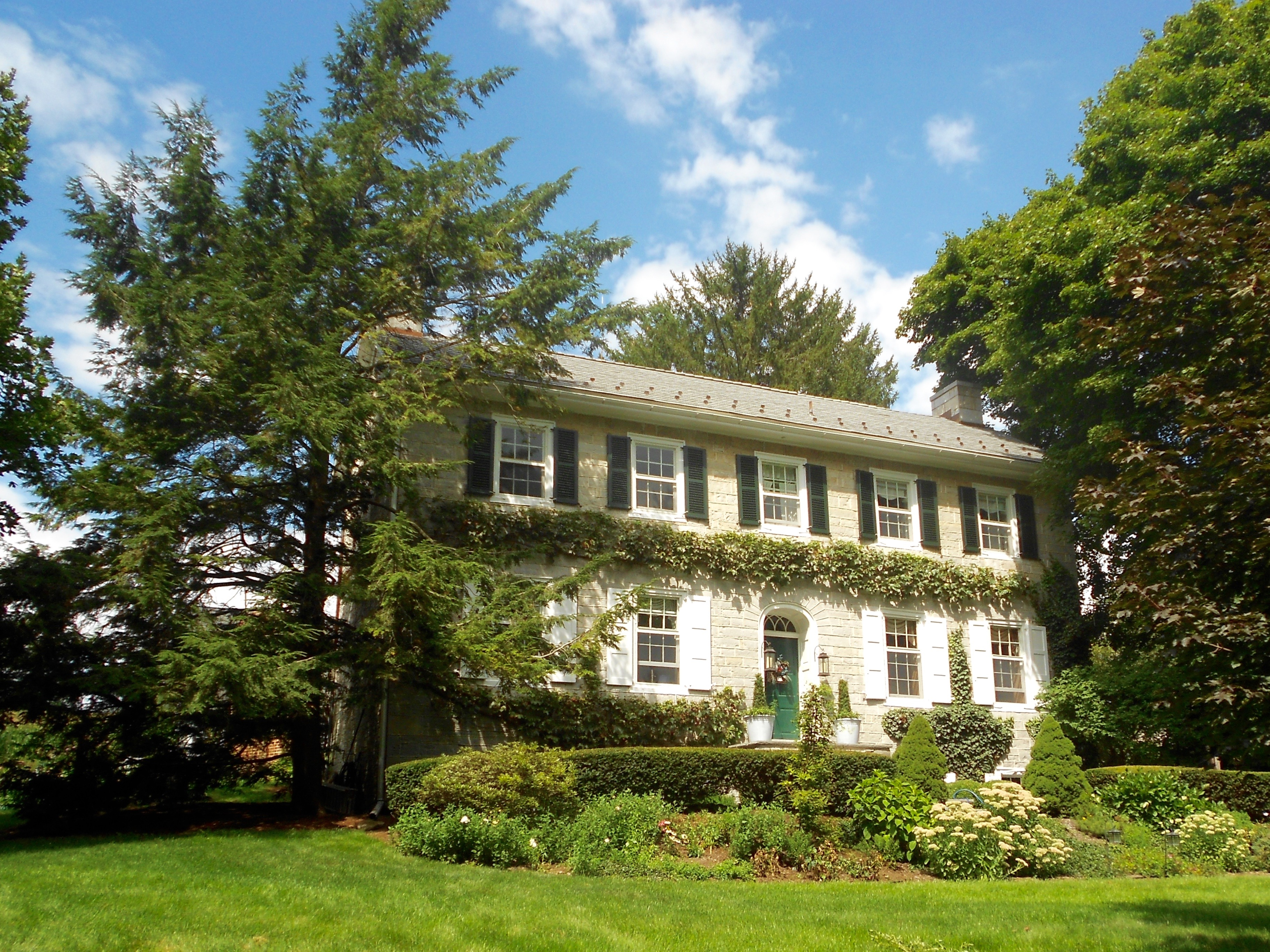

- Location within Pennsylvania Location within the United States
- Location: 2 miles (3.2 km) east of Centre Hall off Pennsylvania Route 192, Potter Township, Pennsylvania
- Coordinates: 40°51′53″N 77°38′22″W
- Area: 1 acre (0.40 ha)
- Built: c. 1825
- NRHP reference No.: 77001141
- Added to NRHP: July 28, 1977

Andrew Gregg Homestead, also known as the Bernard P. Taylor Residence, is a historic home located at Potter Township, Centre County, Pennsylvania. It was built about 1825, and is a two-story, L-shaped, limestone dwelling with a gable roof. At the rear is a one-story frame summer kitchen with a loft and dining room. The interior has a traditional Georgian center hall plan. The house was built by Andrew Gregg, Jr., son of Congressman Andrew Gregg (1755–1835).

It was added to the National Register of Historic Places in 1977.
