= Maj. John Neff Homestead =

Historic house in Pennsylvania, United States

- U.S. National Register of Historic Places
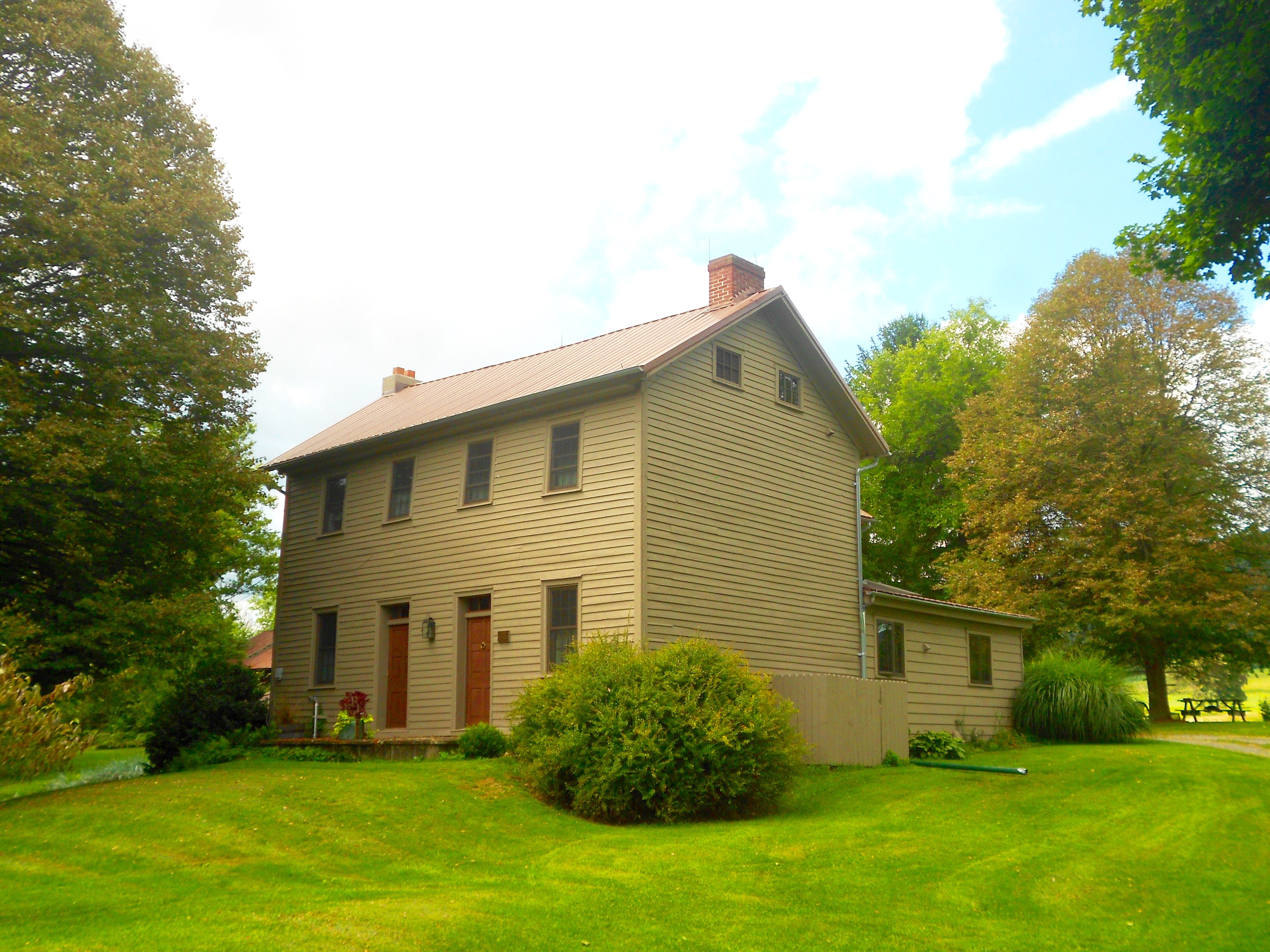

- Location within Pennsylvania Location within the United States
- Nearest city: Southwest of Centre Hall, Potter Township, Pennsylvania
- Coordinates: 40°49′17″N 77°43′38″W
- Area: 1 acre (0.40 ha)
- Built: 1860, 1890
- NRHP reference No.: 77001142
- Added to NRHP: April 11, 1977

The Maj. John Neff Homestead is an historic home and barn complex that is located in Potter Township, Centre County, Pennsylvania, United States.

It was added to the National Register of Historic Places in 1977.

== History and architectural features ==
The log house is a 2 1/2-story, four-bay by two-bay dwelling with a gable roof, which also has a 2 1/2-story log and frame ell in the rear of the building. Also located on the property is a large stone barn, measuring eighty-four feet by fifty feet. Both buildings date to the last half of the nineteenth century.

== Gallery ==
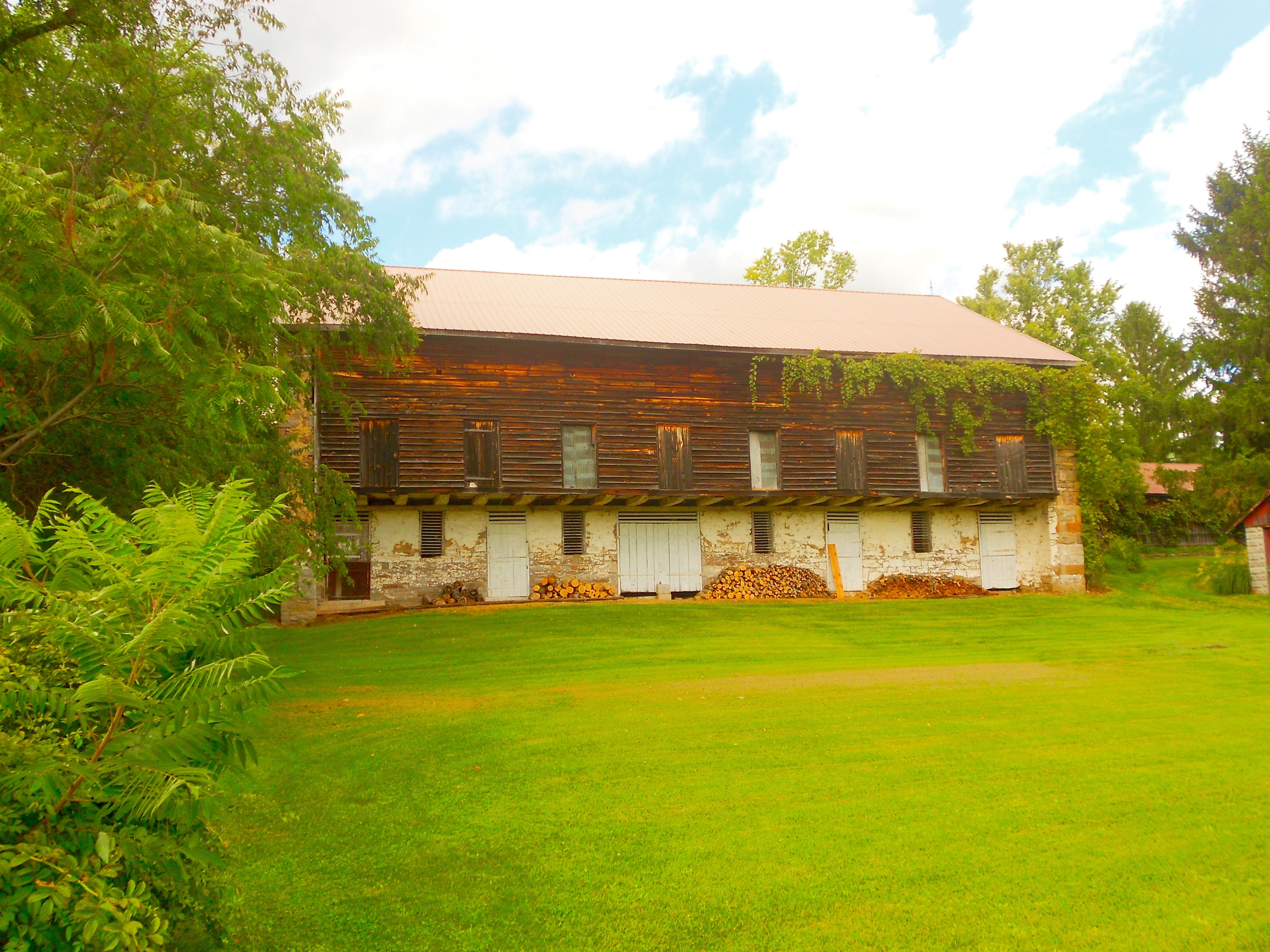
Homestead barn
