= Potter Township, Centre County, Pennsylvania =

Township in Pennsylvania, US

Coordinates: 40°52′31″N 77°39′59″W

- Township
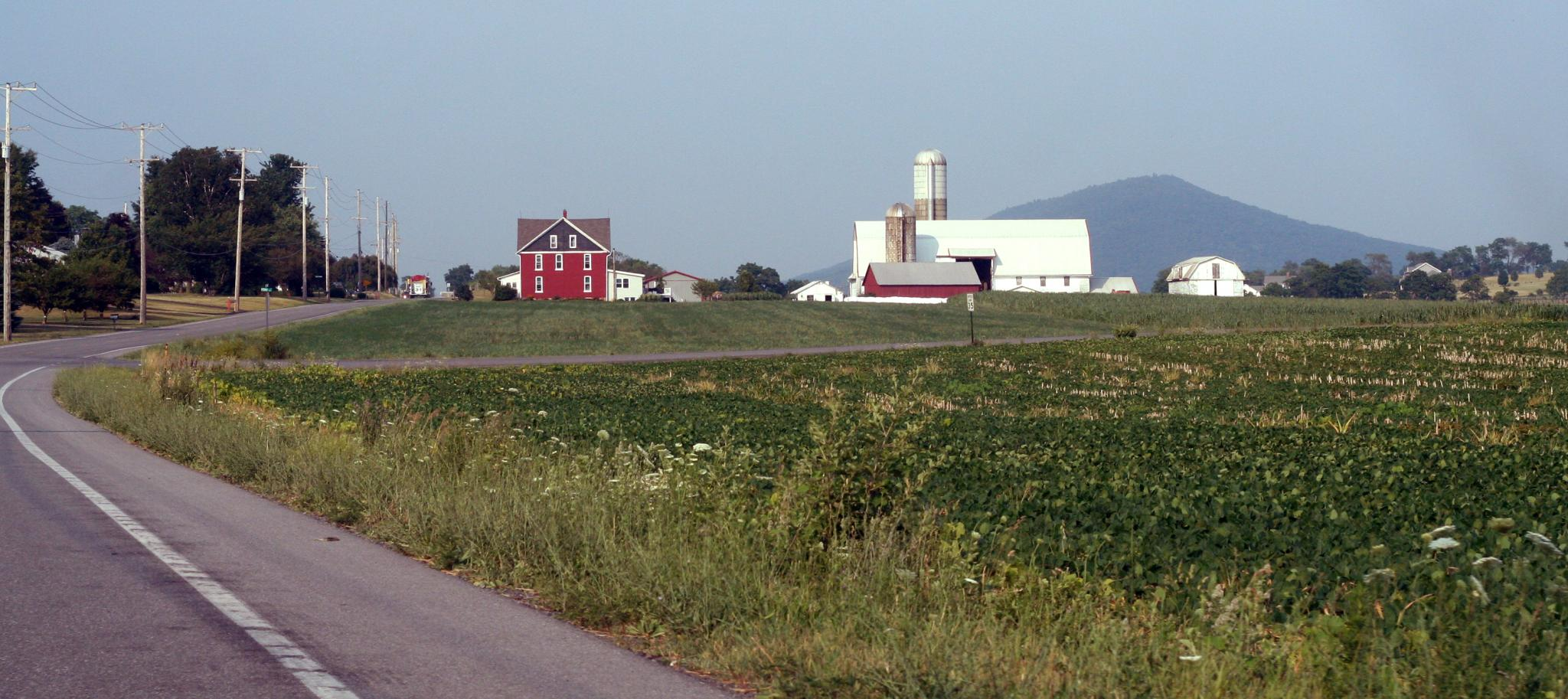
- A farm along Pennsylvania Route 192 just East of Centre Hall

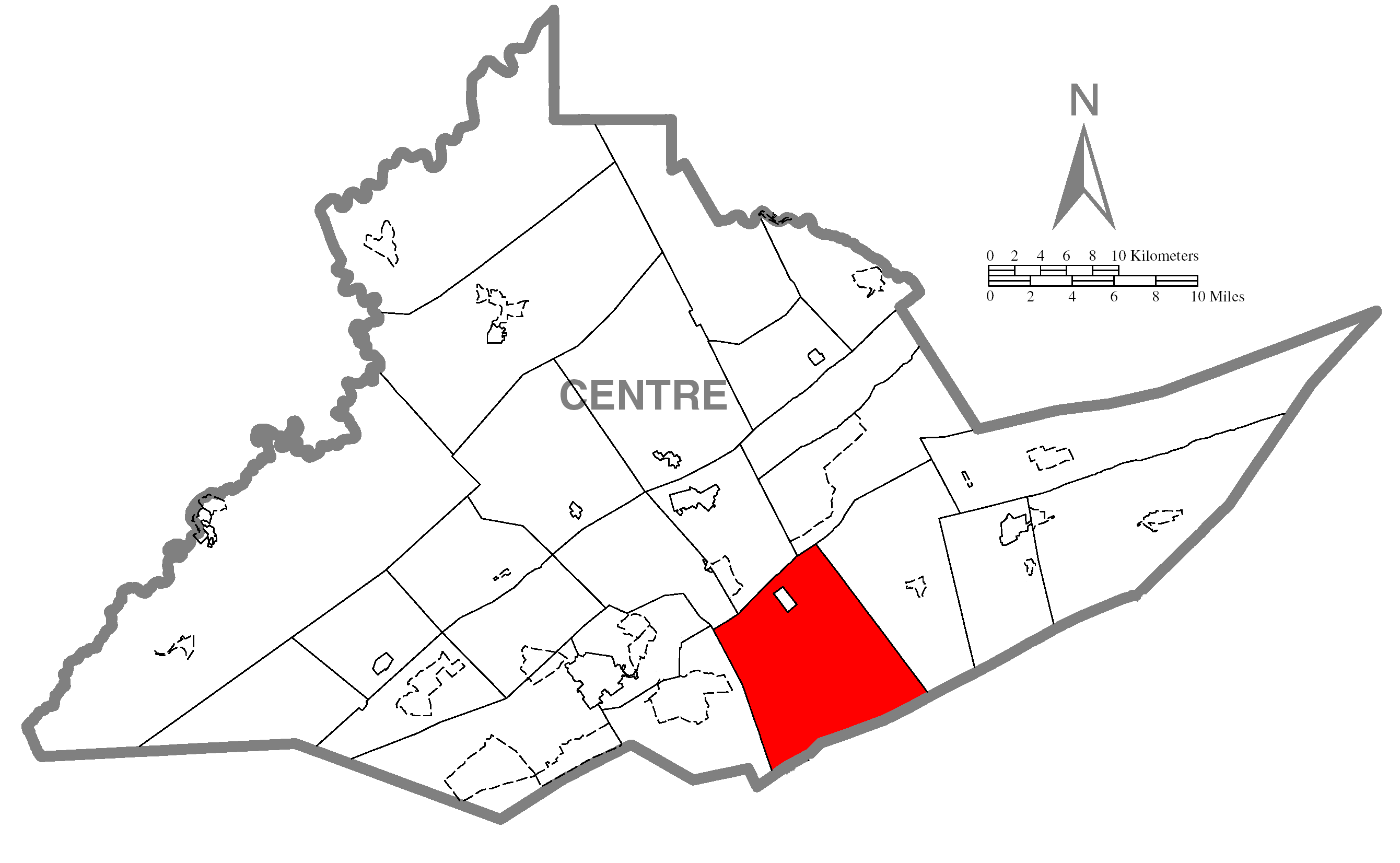
- Map of Centre County, Pennsylvania highlighting Potter Township

- Map of Centre County, Pennsylvania
- Country: United States
- State: Pennsylvania
- County: Centre
- Settled: 1767
- Incorporated: 1774

Government
  - Type: Board of Supervisors
  - Chairman: Tom Sharer
  - Vice-chairman: Jake Tanis
  - Supervisor: Robert Corman
  - Supervisor: Dick Decker
  - Supervisor: Ron Sweitzer

Area
  - Total: 58.98 sq mi (152.77 km^{2})
  - Land: 58.86 sq mi (152.44 km^{2})
  - Water: 0.13 sq mi (0.33 km^{2})

Population (2020)
  - Total: 3,614 ▲
  - Estimate (2021): 3,586
  - Density: 60.5/sq mi (23.36/km^{2})
- ZIP code: 16875
- Area code: 814
- FIPS code: 42-027-62360
- Website: pottertownship.org

Potter Township is a township in Centre County, Pennsylvania, United States. It is part of Penns Valley and the State College, Pennsylvania Metropolitan Statistical Area. The population was 3,614 at the 2020 census. Communities in Potter Township include Black Hawk, Centre Hill, Colyer, Fruittown, Old Fort, Potter Mills, Red Mill, and Tusseyville.

== History ==
=== Indigenous Peoples ===
The first inhabitants of Potter Township came towards the end of the last glacial period. They lived a nomadic hunter-gatherer lifestyle for thousands of years. The Delaware, Iroquois, Mingo, and Shawnee were among the native inhabitants who began establishing settlements, farms, and trails throughout the surrounding valleys and water gaps.

Many of the trails paved by Native Americans are now major roads and highways, including the Kishacoquillas Path, named after a Shawnee chief. The path traversed from present-day Milesburg to Lewistown passing through Old Fort, Potter Mills, and over the Seven Mountains. The path is now Pennsylvania Route 144.

=== European colonization (1764-1874) ===
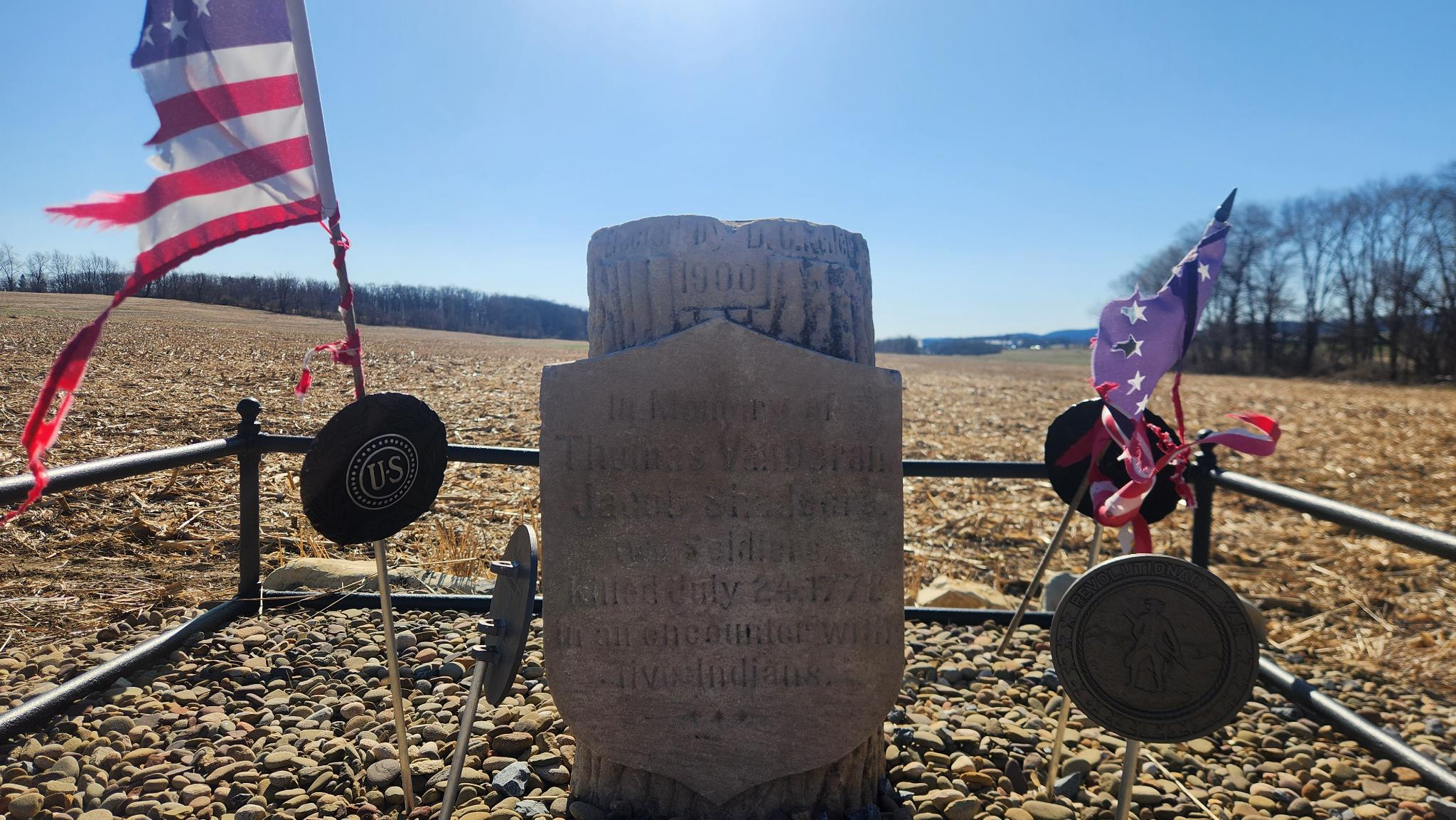
Van Doren and Shadeacre Monument marking a raid by Iroquois warriors in response to the violation of the Treaty of Fort Stanwix

In 1764, using trails established by Native Americans, James Potter, a general and politician from County Tyrone, Ireland, led the first recorded expedition of present-day Centre County, which was part of the frontier that separated the colonists from Indigenous communities.

In 1774 Potter built a log home in the area. In 1777 Potter established Potter Fort (now known as Old Fort) by building a stockade surrounding his home and the nearby spring.

Iroquoian warriors began raiding illegal European settlements resulting in the Big Runaway in the summer of 1778. Two American soldiers were killed in these raids a mile east of Old Fort. Settlers in Penns Valley fled to Fort Augusta at Sunbury alongside other settlers near the West Branch Susquehanna River.

In 1788 James Potter established a log house and tavern Potter Mills along the banks of Sinking Creek. By 1817 the hamlet had five mills. By 1874 Potters Mills had 48 residents, it has since grown to a population of 263.

=== Grange Fair and Rhoneymeade (1874-present) ===
Potter Township hosts the Grange Encampment and Fair garnering over 200,000 visitors, 1,000 tents, and 1,500 RV's, bringing in $2.6 million in 2017. The fair began as a picnic in 1874 organized by Leonard Rhone to inform other grangers of the Order of Patrons of Husbandry.

Leonard Rhone's historic homestead is home to Rhoneymeade Arboretum and Sculpture Garden. In 1986 the homestead became the first property to be permanently conserved by the ClearWater Conservancy.

=== Colyer Lake and sawmill ===
William Colyer built a sawmill near Tussey Mountain providing lumber for the nearby communities and fueling the local iron furnaces. A post office and general store were built to serve the community now known as Colyer. In the 1960s a dam was built on Sinking Creek by the Pennsylvania Fish Commission creating Colyer Lake.

=== State College Area Connector Project ===
During a press conference in 2019 Gov. Tom Wolf announced that the state would fund a project to replace or upgrade a section of Route 322 in Potter Township. The section stretched from Potter Mills to the Mount Nittany Expressway, and ran through Tusseyville, Colyer, and a section of Harris Township. An alternate route was proposed that traveled from Potter Mills to Interstate 99, going through Red Mill, Centre Hill, Old Fort, and Black Hawk Gap, before joining I-99 in Spring Township.

The project came under scrutiny due to the high cost upwards of $800 million. The connector project is expected to cause damage to or destroy important farmlands, soils, and other habitats. Homes, barns, and historic sites are also at risk of demolition. The project poses a risk to the local Amish community, and other people who don't drive cars. Signs pitched alongside Route 322 in Potter Township protested the project. One sign read, "SAVE COLYER", and "NO Divided Families or Farms."

=== Historic Places ===
Located in Potter Township are the following sites on the National Register of Historic Places: Andrew Gregg Homestead, Egg Hill Church, Maj. John Neff Homestead, Neff Round Barn, Leonard Rhone House, Potter-Allison Farm, and Daniel Waggoner Log House and Barn.

Potter's Fort is commemorated with a historical marker on South Pennsylvania Avenue beside a barn.

== Geography ==
According to the United States Census Bureau, the township has a total area of 59.0 square miles (152.8 km^{2}), of which 58.8 square miles (152.4 km^{2}) is land and 0.12 square miles (0.3 km^{2}), or 0.22%, is water.

Potter Township is bordered by Benner, Spring and Walker townships to the north, Gregg Township to the east, Mifflin and Huntingdon counties to the south, and Harris Township to the west. The township also surrounds the separate borough of Centre Hall and is part of the Penns Valley region of Centre County.

The area in the valley south of Nittany Mountain is known as "The Great Plains", "The Plains", and "Potter Plains". Reverend Philip Vickers Fithian, who stayed at James Potter's home, wrote a detailed account of his experience in Penns Valley. He described The Great Plains as such:

... in this Valley (Penns Valley) are large open Plains. cleared either by the Indians, or by accidental Fire, hundreds of Acres covered with fine grass, mixed with small Weed and great Variety of Flowers ...

Penn's Prairie at Tri-Municipal Park in Potter Township is jointly owned by Potter Township and Centre Hall. Half of the 165-acre park is dedicated towards plant and wildlife restoration, conservation and a cultural rejuvenation of The Great Plains.

== Demographics ==
Historical population
Census	Pop.	Note	%±
2000	3,339		—
2010	3,517		5.3%
2020	3,614		2.8%
2021 (est.)	3,586		−0.8%
U.S. Decennial Census

As of the census of 2000, there were 3,339 people, 1,267 households, and 952 families residing in the township. The population density was 57.5 inhabitants per square mile (22.2/km^{2}). There were 1,467 housing units at an average density of 25.2/sq mi (9.7/km^{2}). The racial makeup of the township was 98.71% White, 0.39% African American, 0.15% Native American, 0.18% Asian, 0.03% Pacific Islander, 0.21% from other races, and 0.33% from two or more races. Hispanic or Latino of any race were 0.45% of the population.

There were 1,267 households, out of which 31.3% had children under the age of 18 living with them, 65.8% were married couples living together, 5.9% had a female householder with no husband present, and 24.8% were non-families. 20.4% of all households were made up of individuals, and 8.3% had someone living alone who was 65 years of age or older. The average household size was 2.54 and the average family size was 2.94.

In the township the population was spread out, with 26.0% under the age of 18, 6.1% from 18 to 24, 29.0% from 25 to 44, 27.3% from 45 to 64, and 11.7% who were 65 years of age or older. The median age was 39 years. For every 100 females, there were 98.5 males. For every 100 females age 18 and over, there were 100.7 males.

The median income for a household in the township was $43,556, and the median income for a family was $50,000. Males had a median income of $36,571 versus $23,781 for females. The per capita income for the township was $21,320. About 7.0% of families and 8.1% of the population were below the poverty line, including 8.4% of those under age 18 and 8.2% of those age 65 or over.

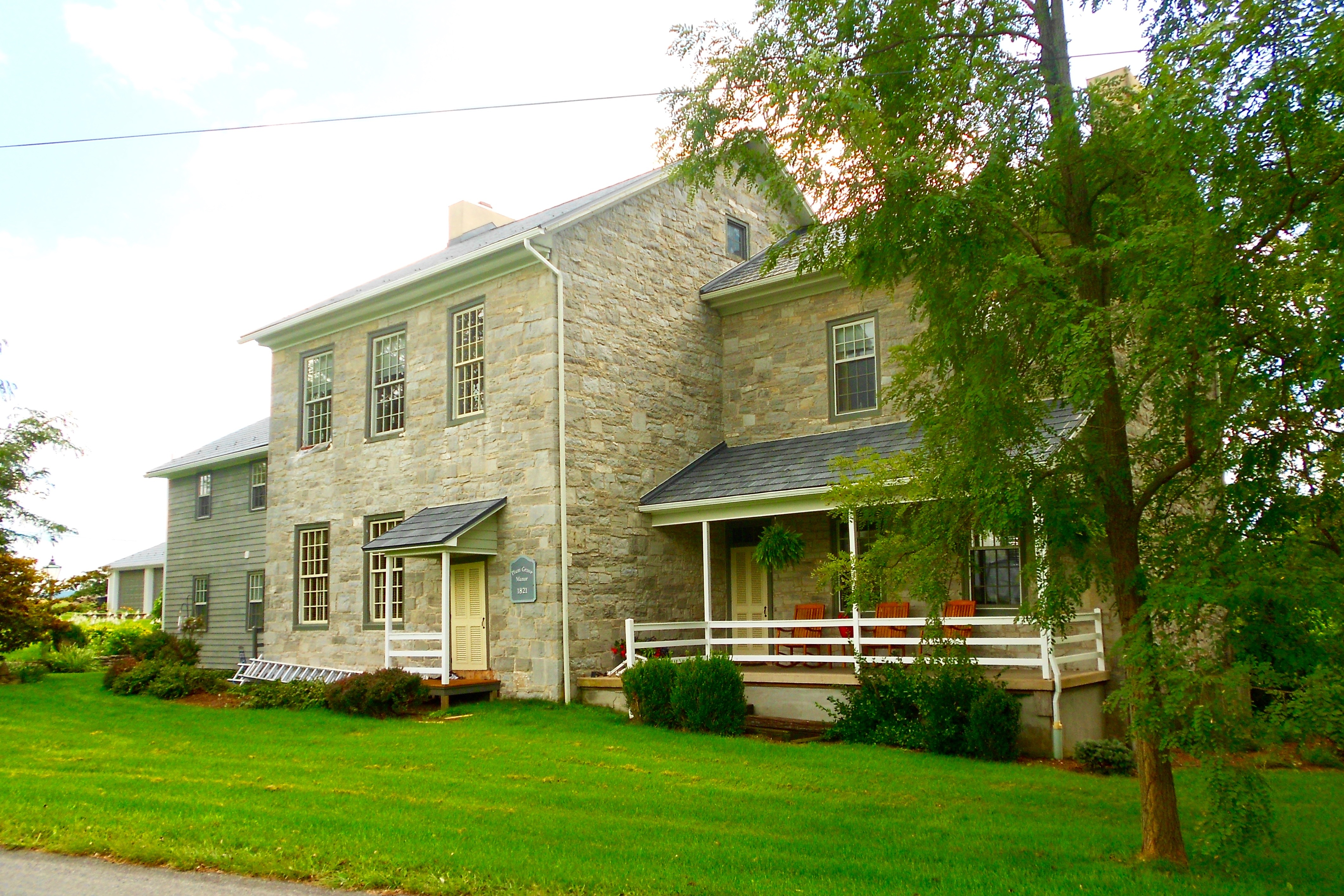
Plum Grove Manor on Manor Road

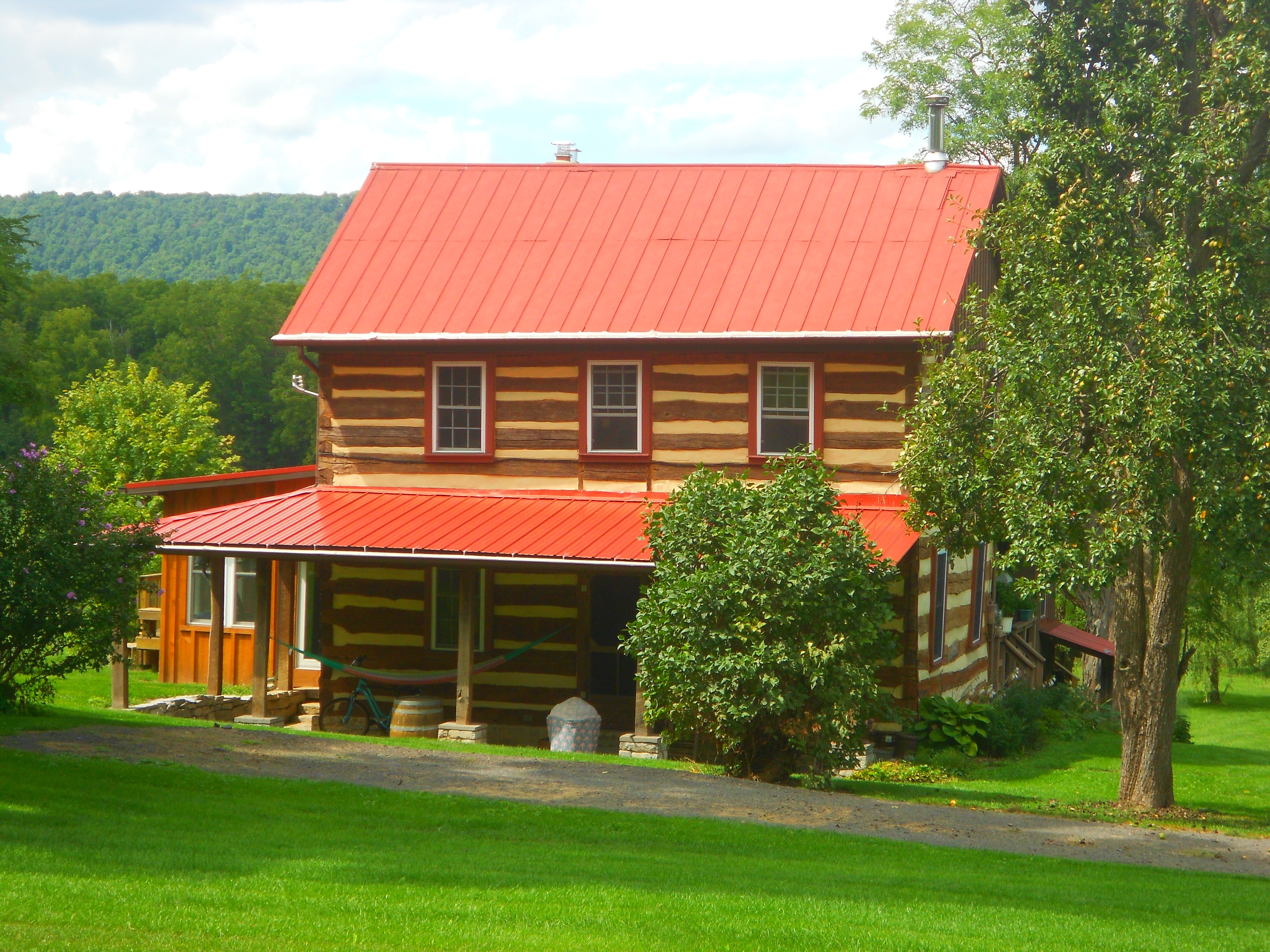
Standford house

== Transportation ==
Highways include:

- U.S. Route 322
- Pennsylvania Route 26
- Pennsylvania Route 144
- Pennsylvania Route 192

== Education ==
Potter Township is in the Penns Valley Area School District.
