= Neff Round Barn =

- U.S. National Register of Historic Places
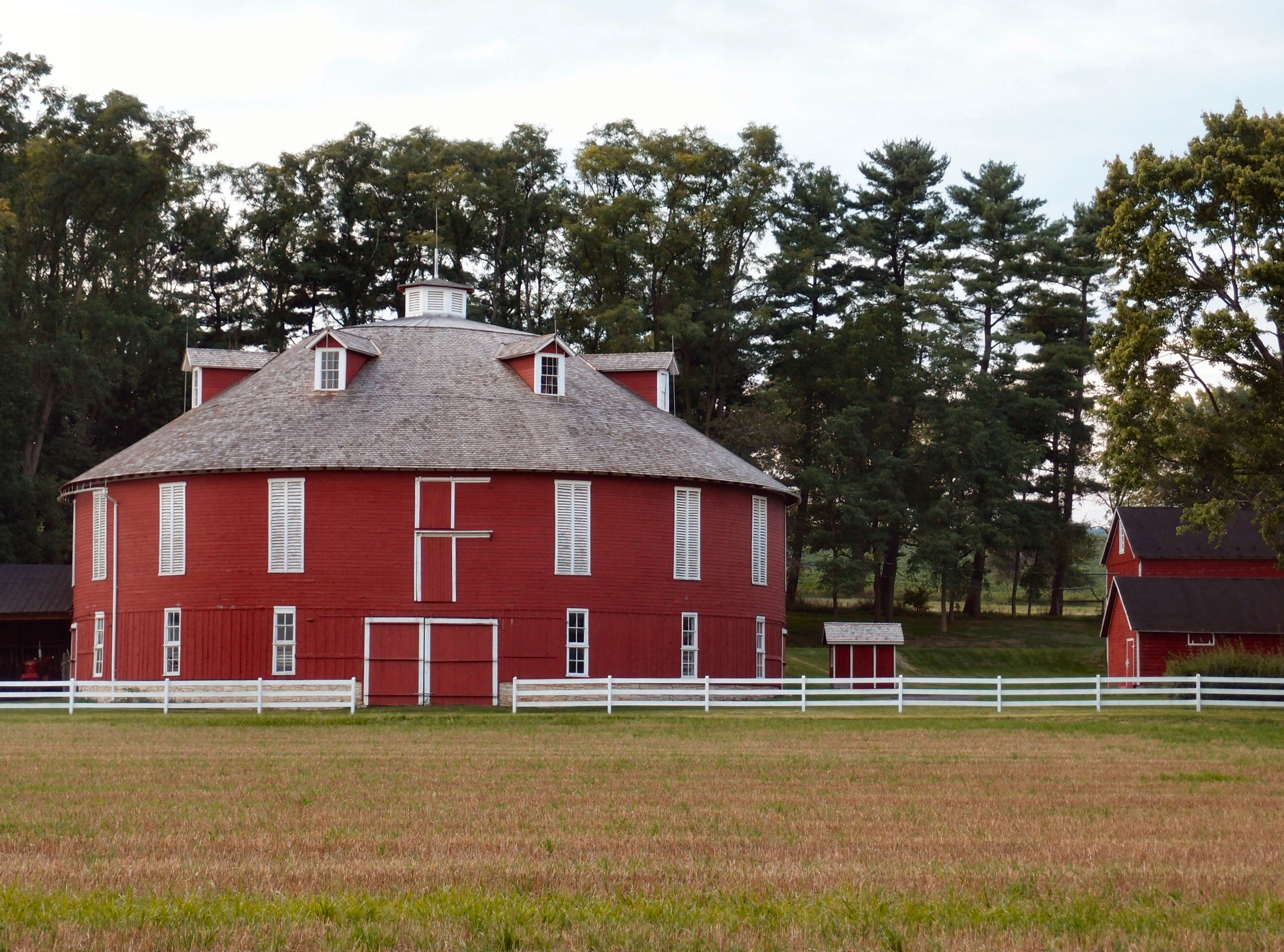
- Neff Round Barn, September 2012

- Location within Pennsylvania Location within the United States
- Location: South of Centre Hall off Pennsylvania Route 45, Potter Township, Pennsylvania
- Coordinates: 40°49′3″N 77°42′6″W
- Area: 0.3 acres (0.12 ha)
- Built: c. 1910
- Built by: Aaron Thomas, Calvin R. Neff
- Architectural style: Round Barn
- NRHP reference No.: 79002181
- Added to NRHP: May 2, 1979

The Neff Round Barn, also known as the Red Round Barn, is an historic round barn in Potter Township, Centre County, Pennsylvania, United States.

It was added to the National Register of Historic Places in 1979.

== History and architectural features ==
Built circa 1910, this historic structure is a white pine structure that sits on a limestone foundation. The interior has two floors: the cattle floor and the mow floor. It is 88 feet (27 m) in diameter and 56 feet (17 m) tall at the cupola, encompassing 6,000 square feet. It has a conical roof.

== Gallery ==
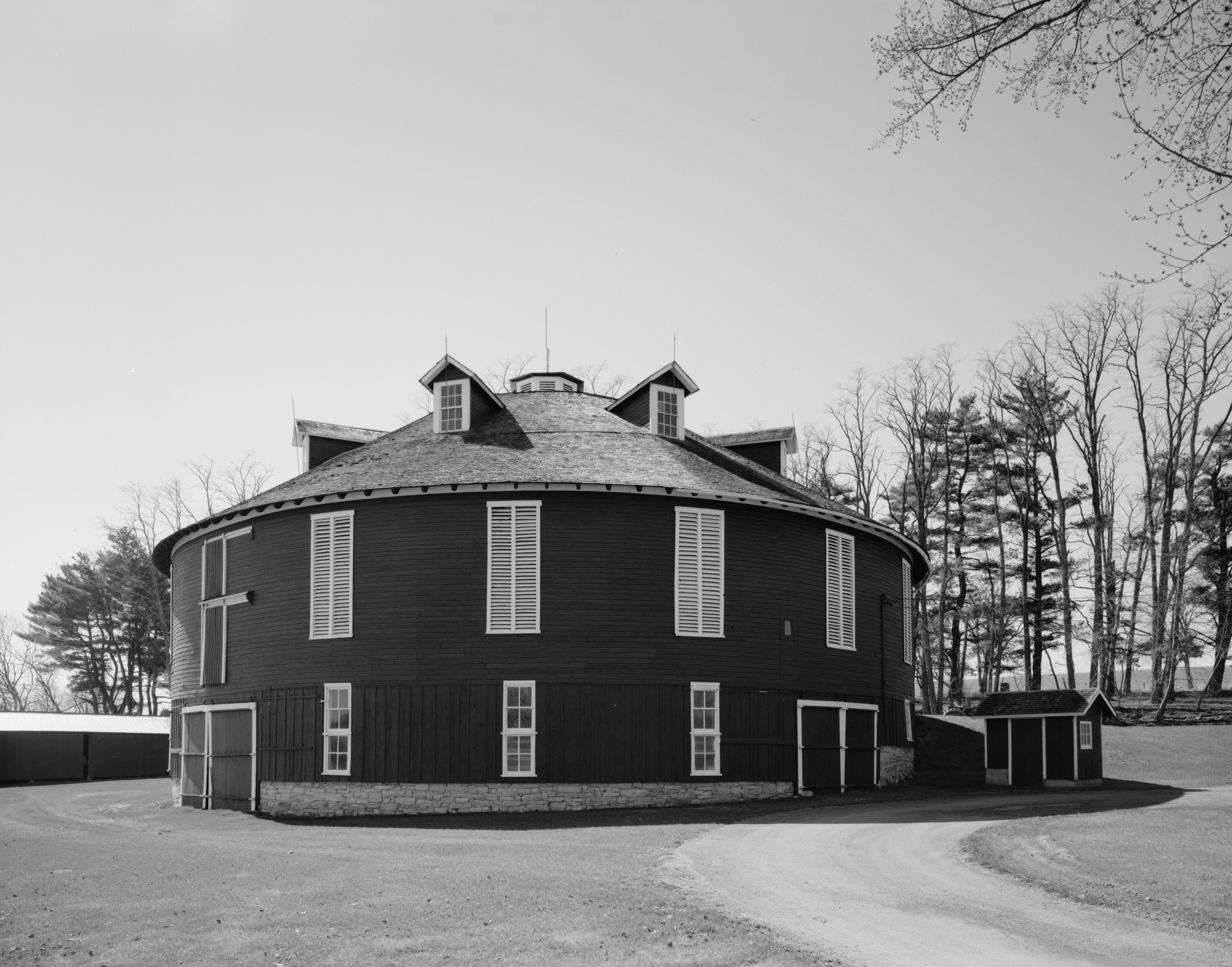
Neff Round Barn, HABS Photo, 2005
