= Leonard Rhone House =

Historic house in Pennsylvania, United States

- U.S. National Register of Historic Places
- Location within Pennsylvania Location within the United States
- Location: 177 Rimmey Road, near Centre Hall, off Pennsylvania Route 45, Potter Township, Pennsylvania
- Coordinates: 40°48′32″N 77°43′16″W
- Area: 2.3 acres (0.93 ha)
- Built: 1853
- Architectural style: Georgian
- NRHP reference No.: 85003448
- Added to NRHP: October 31, 1985

Leonard Rhone House, also known as Rhoneymeade, is a historic home located at Potter Township, Centre County, Pennsylvania. It was built about 1853, and is a 2 1/2-story, L-shaped brick dwelling with a gable roof. It sits on a limestone foundation. The interior has a traditional Georgian center hall plan. Also on the property is a contributing outbuilding. The house was built by Leonard Rhone, who is traditionally regarded as the father of the Grange Fair.

It was added to the National Register of Historic Places in 1985.

The house and the surrounding property are now maintained as an arboretum and sculpture garden. There also is a labyrinth on the property. Visitors are welcomed free of charge on Saturdays and Sundays from 10am-4pm from April through October.
