= Daniel Waggoner Log House and Barn =

Historic house in Pennsylvania, United States

- U.S. National Register of Historic Places
- Location within Pennsylvania Location within the United States
- Location: Southwest of Spring Mills, Potter Township, Pennsylvania
- Coordinates: 40°49′52″N 77°37′11″W
- Area: 1 acre (0.40 ha)
- Built: c. 1809
- Architect: Daniel Waggoner
- Architectural style: "Continental" log house
- NRHP reference No.: 79002190
- Added to NRHP: April 18, 1979

Daniel Waggoner Log House and Barn is a historic home and barn located at Potter Township, Centre County, Pennsylvania. The log house was built about 1809, and is a two-story dwelling with a gable roof, measuring 32 feet by 28 feet. Also on the property is a contributing log barn, also built about 1809.

It was added to the National Register of Historic Places in 1979.
