= Colyer, Pennsylvania =

Unincorporated community in Pennsylvania, US

- Unincorporated community
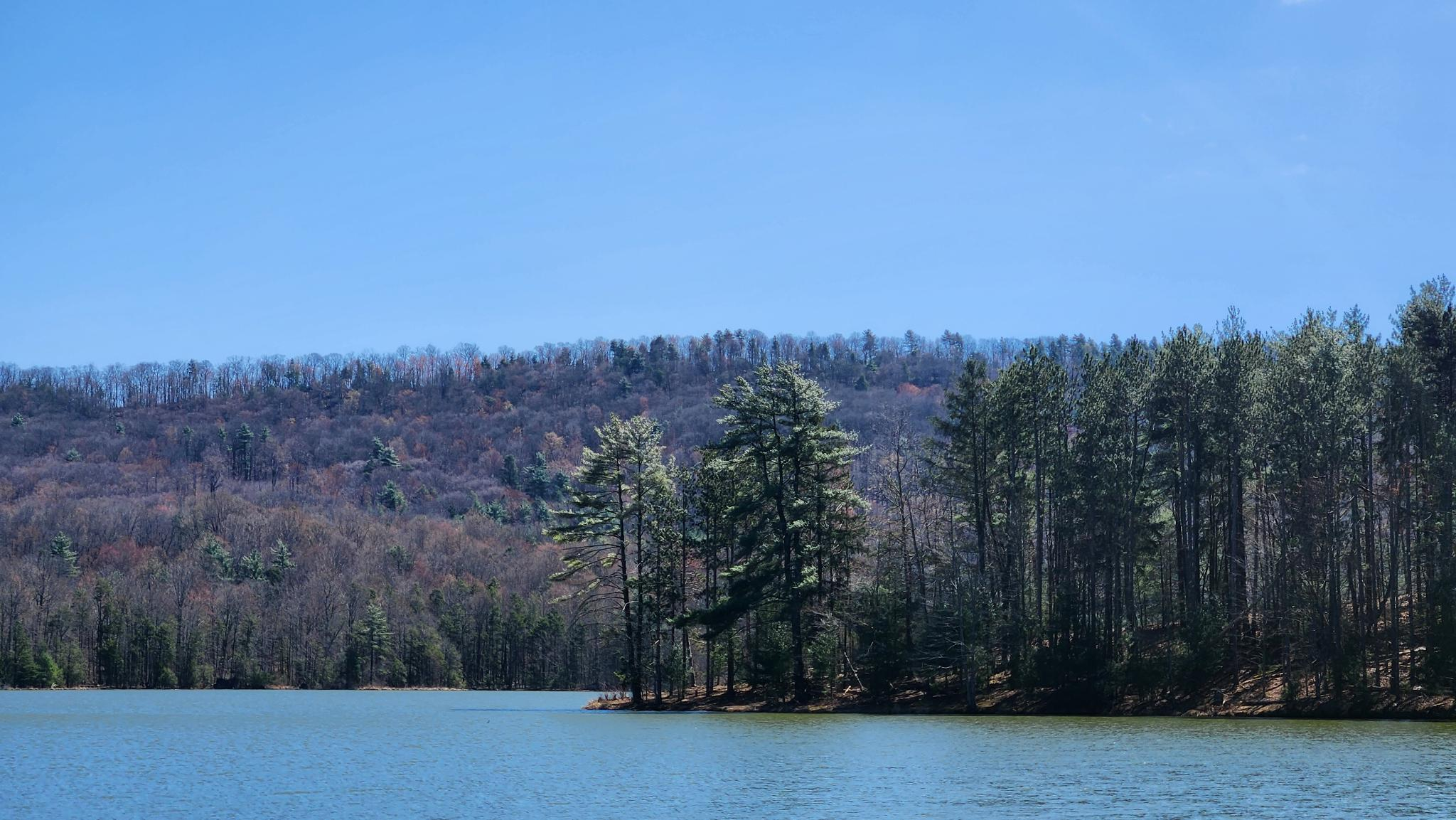
- Colyer Lake in early April

- Location within the U.S. state of Pennsylvania Colyer (the United States)
- Coordinates: 40°47′03″N 77°40′33″W
- Country: United States
- State: Pennsylvania
- County: Centre
- Township: Potter
- Time zone: UTC-5 (Eastern (EST))
  - Summer (DST): UTC-4 (EDT)
- GNIS feature ID: 1203313

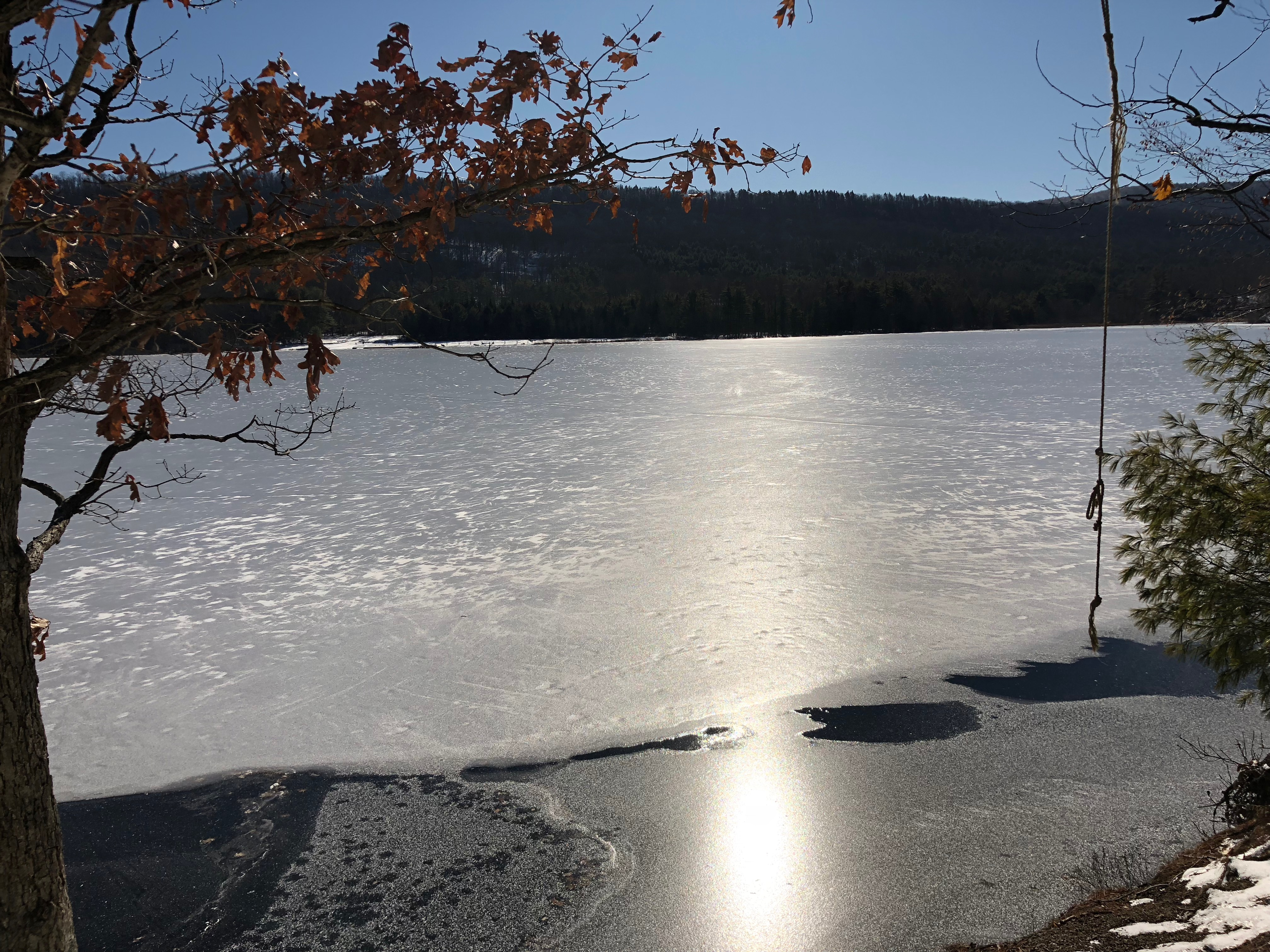
Colyer Lake in winter

Colyer is a small unincorporated community south of the borough of Centre Hall in central Potter Township, Centre County, Pennsylvania, United States.

== History ==
The community takes its name from Colyer's Sawmill, which once stood near the intersection of Bubb and Colyer Roads. A combined general store/post office was located nearby, but was converted to a private residence in the late 1940s. Of three churches that originally operated within Colyer's boundaries, only the Colyer Brethren in Christ (BIC) Church maintains an active congregation.

== Recreation ==
Within the Colyer geographic area is Colyer Lake, a 77-acre body of water supported by the Colyer Lake Dam. Constructed in the late 1960s by the Commonwealth of Pennsylvania's Fish & Boat Commission, the dam was extensively renovated in 2017, at which time a 2.5-mile hiking trail that traverses the entire perimeter of the lake was opened to the public.
