= Potters Mills, Pennsylvania =

Unincorporated community in Pennsylvania, US

- Unincorporated community
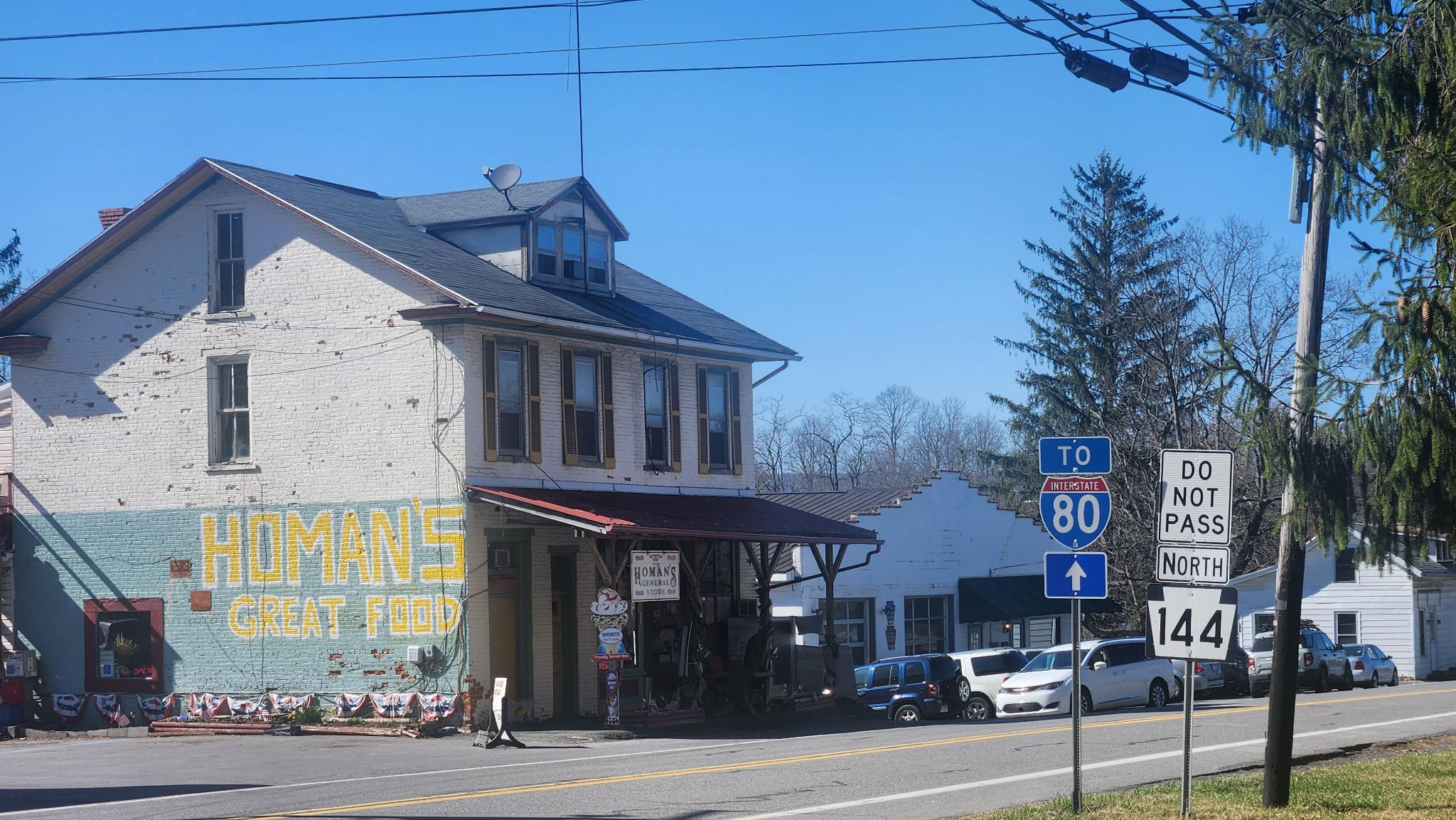
- A general store on PA-144 in Potters Mills

- Location within the state of Pennsylvania Potters; Mills (the United States)
- Coordinates: 40°47′45″N 77°37′31″W
- Country: United States
- State: Pennsylvania
- County: Centre
- Township: Potter

Area
  - Total: 1.27 sq mi (3.30 km^{2})
  - Land: 1.27 sq mi (3.30 km^{2})
  - Water: 0 sq mi (0.00 km^{2})
- Elevation: 1,253 ft (382 m)

Population (2020)
  - Total: 263
  - Density: 206.5/sq mi (79.74/km^{2})
- Time zone: UTC-5 (Eastern (EST))
  - Summer (DST): UTC-4 (EDT)
- FIPS code: 42-62384
- GNIS feature ID: 1184344

Potters Mills is a village in Potter Township, Centre County, Pennsylvania, United States, just east of the Potter-Allison Farm. It is named after General James Potter (1729–1789), who built a log cabin and grist mill there, at what is now the intersection of General Potter Highway (U.S. Route 322) and the Old Fort Road (Pennsylvania Route 144).

== Demographics ==
Historical population
| Census | Pop. | Note | %± |
|---|---|---|---|
| 2020 | 263 | | — |
U.S. Decennial Census

== Notable person ==
- John Potter, Jr., Wisconsin legislator, was born in Potters Mills.
