= Battle of Matson's Ford =

Battle of the American Revolutionary War

Coordinates: 40.07128°N 75.309935°W

- Part of the American Revolutionary War
| Date | December 11, 1777 |
| Location | Matson's Ford, near present-day Conshohocken and West Conshohocken, Pennsylvania |
| Result | British victory |

Belligerents
| United States; Pennsylvania militia | Great Britain |

Commanders and leaders
| (Pennsylvania) John Lacey (Pennsylvania) James Potter | (Kingdom of Great Britain) Lord Cornwallis |

Strength
| Unknown | 3,500 |

Casualties and losses
| 5 or 6 killed 20 wounded 20 captured | Unknown |

The Battle of Matson's Ford was a battle in the Philadelphia campaign of the American Revolutionary War fought on December 11, 1777 in the area surrounding Matson's Ford (present-day Conshohocken and West Conshohocken, Pennsylvania). In this series of minor skirmish actions, advance patrols of Pennsylvania militia crossed to the west side of the Schuylkill River, encountered a British foraging expedition, and were overrun. The British pushed ahead to Matson's Ford, where units of the Continental Army were also crossing to the west side of the river. The Americans retreated back to the east side, destroying their temporary bridge made from wagons that had been lashed together. The British remained on the west side of the Schuylkill overnight but left the area the next day to continue foraging elsewhere. The Continentals moved northward and crossed to the west side of the river at Swede's Ford (present-day Norristown). They proceeded to Bridgeport, Pennsylvania, a few miles upriver from Matson's Ford.

== Background ==
Following the British capture of New York City in a 1776 campaign, British commander Lieutenant General General William Howe turned his thoughts to capturing the seat of the Second Continental Congress, Philadelphia. In July 1777 he embarked about 18,000 troops on transports in New York, and sailed to the northern reaches of the Chesapeake Bay. Landing his troops there in late August, he defeated the Continental Army of General George Washington at the September 11 Battle of Brandywine, and occupied Philadelphia without opposition on September 25 after Washington was forced to retreat west of the city.

In early December 1777, General Howe led a sizable contingent of troops out of British-occupied Philadelphia in one last attempt to destroy Washington's army before the onset of winter. At the Battle of White Marsh (December 5–8), Washington successfully repelled the British attacks, and Howe returned to Philadelphia without engaging Washington in a decisive conflict. After the battle, Washington and his troops remained encamped at White Marsh.

== Prelude ==
On December 10, George Washington's council determined that the Continental Army would move to winter quarters somewhere west of the Schuylkill River. The army struck camp the morning of December 11, and proceeded to march through Plymouth Meeting, across Ridge Road, and down to the river crossing at Matson's Ford (following the route of present-day Butler Pike). In preparation for the crossing, Washington ordered the Pennsylvania militia, under the command of General James Potter, to establish three advance pickets west of the river to warn of British troop movements: one at Middle Ferry (where Market Street now crosses the Schuylkill River), another at Black Horse Inn at City Line and Old Lancaster Road, and the third at Harriton House (the home of Charles Thomson, secretary of the Continental Congress) on Old Gulph Road.

Unbeknownst to the Americans, General Charles Cornwallis led a sizable British force out of the city on a foraging expedition early that morning. Cornwallis was also apparently unaware of the Continental Army movement some ten miles upriver, and had planned to forage in the area just south of Matson's Ford. Employing a local resident named John Roberts (who despite protestations that he acted under duress, was convicted and hanged in 1778 for assisting Cornwallis) as a guide, Cornwallis crossed to the west side of the Schuylkill at Middle Ferry, drawing a round of musket fire from the American picket there before it withdrew. Cornwallis then proceeded up the road toward Matson's Ford. His force consisted of battalions of British light infantry and grenadiers, one brigade of regular infantry, two troops of dragoons, and a detachment of German jägers. The force took with them six 6-pound cannons.

== Battle ==
Soon after, the militia stationed at the Black Horse Inn exchanged fire with the British troops. Outnumbered and flanked, the militia began to fall back in some confusion, taking casualties along the way. Reports were delivered to Potter, who was with the contingent located at Harriton House, indicating that the British were "advancing in force" up Gulph Road and towards his location.

Potter stationed five regiments of militia between the British forces and Harriton House. However, the militia were quickly overrun and they hastily retreated back through Gulph Mills to Swede's Ford (present-day Norristown). The retreat was so chaotic that militiamen literally threw away their muskets and ammunition as they ran (an offense for which they would later be fined or publicly whipped). With the militia in retreat, Cornwallis discontinued pursuit and took up a strong position on the heights overlooking Matson's Ford.

General Potter estimated his casualties at 5 killed, 20 wounded, and 20 taken prisoner, although he also claimed he was "not able to assurtain" the full extent of his losses. He believed the British casualties to be higher than his. Jäger Captain Johann Ewald recorded that the British captured about 160 men in the battle "after a stubborn resistance".

== Aftermath ==
The day after the battle, two Continental Army divisions under the command of General John Sullivan constructed a temporary bridge made from wagons that had been lashed together, and began crossing at Matson's Ford. Those divisions had almost completed crossing the river when the British position on the heights was spotted. Sullivan quickly ordered a retreat back across the river, and destroyed the makeshift bridge behind him.

The Continental Army spent December 11–12 in the hills above Swede's Ford, while Washington sent out scouting parties on December 12 to determine the extent of the British force across the river. However, Cornwallis had already left the area, beginning a roundabout route that brought him back to Philadelphia with a load of provisions. On the evening of December 12, Washington's army crossed the Schuylkill River at Swede's Ford using makeshift wagon bridges and proceeded down Swedeland Road to Gulph Mills, where they remained from December 13 till December 19. In recognition of the American victory at the Battle of Saratoga, December 18 was celebrated as day of "Thanksgiving and Praise" (the first national holiday for the Thirteen Colonies). On December 19, the army marched 7 miles (11 km) west on Gulph Road to their winter quarters at Valley Forge.
