= Potter–Allison Farm =

- U.S. National Register of Historic Places
- U.S. Historic district
- Location within Pennsylvania Location within the United States
- Location: Southeast of Centre Hall on Pennsylvania Route 144, Potter Township, Pennsylvania
- Coordinates: 40°58′26″N 77°44′33″W
- Area: 136 acres (55 ha)
- Built: 1817
- Architectural style: Late Victorian, Georgian
- NRHP reference No.: 77001143
- Added to NRHP: December 6, 1977

The Potter–Allison Farm is an historic farm complex and national historic district that is located in Potter Township, Centre County, Pennsylvania, United States.

It was added to the National Register of Historic Places in 1977.

== History and architectural features ==
This district includes nine contributing buildings and one contributing site in Centre Hall. The district includes the Potter–Allison House, a nineteenth-century wood barn, and a variety of outbuildings, including a hog barn, equipment buildings, a corn crib, a stone slaughterhouse, and a springhouse. Also located on the property are the remains of milling and tanning operations.

The Georgian-style house was built circa 1817, with a Victorian section added sometime during the 1850s. It is a two-and-one-half-story brick dwelling.

The property was originally owned and developed by General James Potter (1729–1789), who built a log cabin and grist mill.

The property was acquired by the locally prominent Allison family in 1849.
