= Grange Fair =

Annual fair in Pennsylvania

Coordinates: 40.83392°N 77.68331°W

Centre County Grange Fair
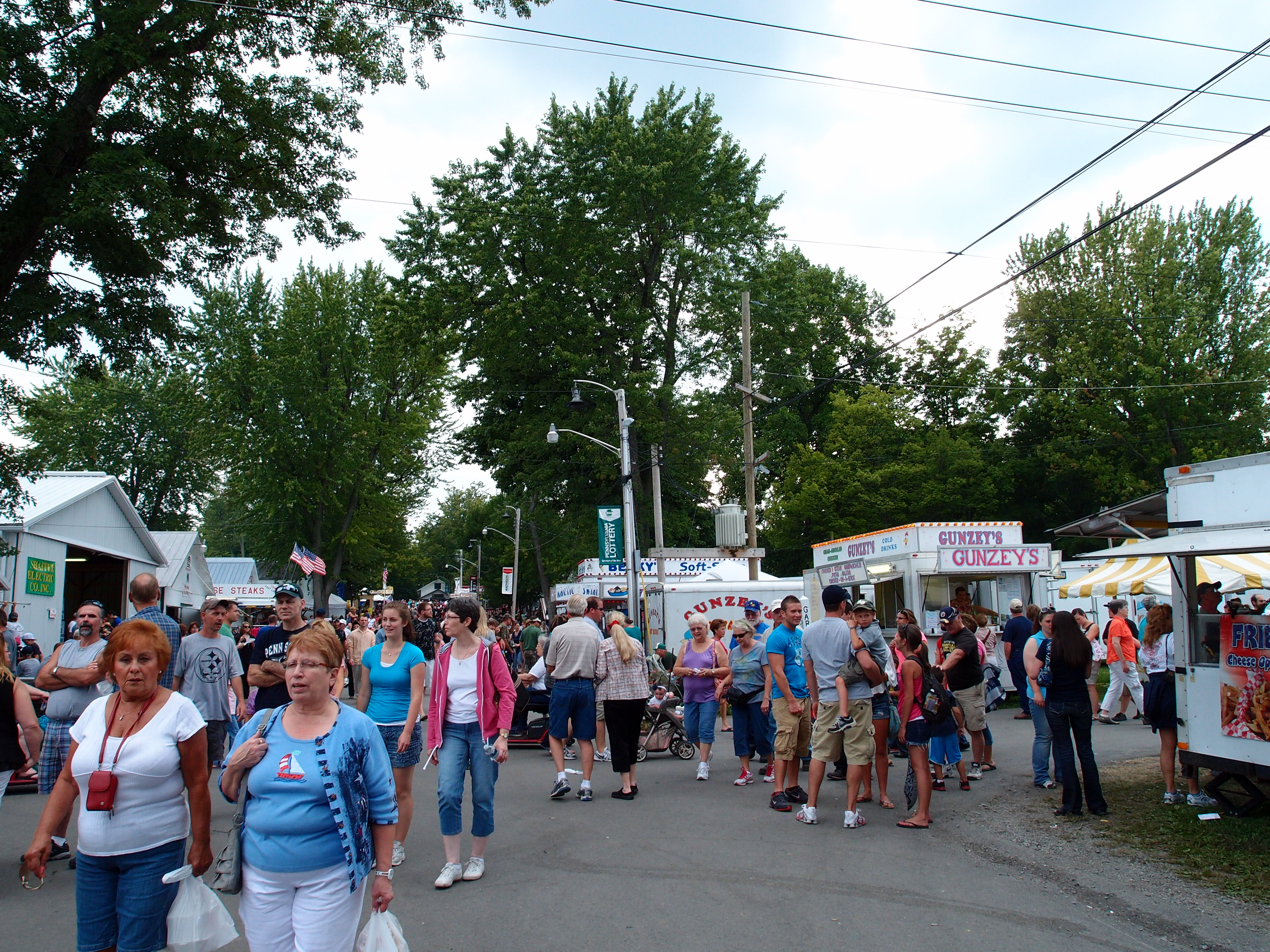
- Fairgoers at the Grange Fair
- Genre: County fair
- Dates: August 18th-26th 2023
- Locations: Potter Township, Pennsylvania
- Years active: 1874–1916, 1919–1941, 1946–2019, 2021–
- Website: Official website

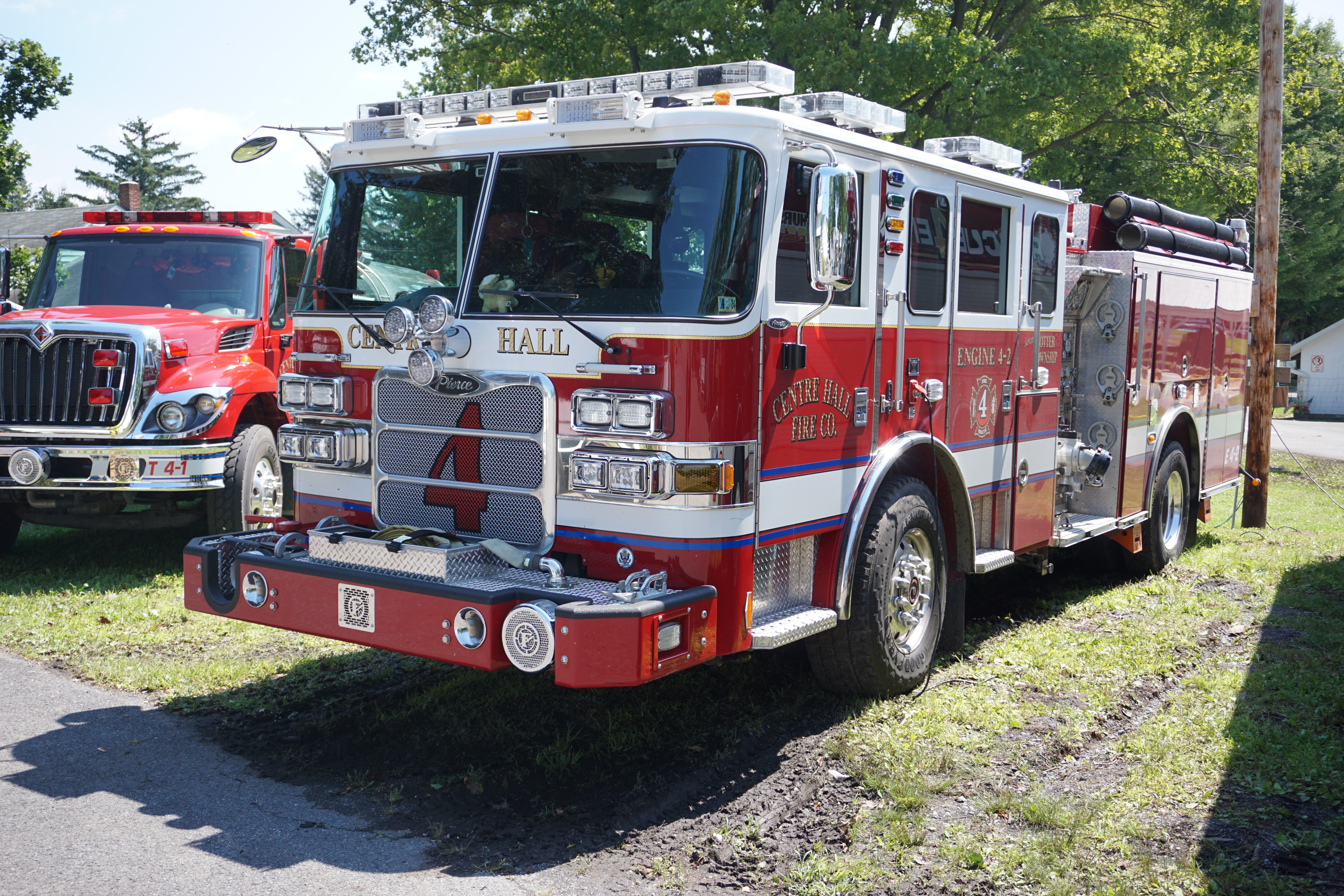
Centre Hall Fire Company Engine 4-2 at Grange Fair

The Grange Fair is an annual fair and camping event held in Potter Township in Centre County near Centre Hall, Pennsylvania each year since 1874.

The fair is typically held in the last full week of August. On the last day of 140th Grange Fair, it was announced that the 2015 Grange Fair would be moving a week earlier and adding 1 day, with the fair going from 7 days to 9 days. The 2005 Emmy awarding winning documentary film The Grange Fair: An American Tradition directed by Joe Myers chronicles the 131st Grange Fair.

== Attractions ==
The Centre County Grange Fair is most notable for allowing fairgoers to camp on the grounds, but the fair also has carnival rides, many types of food stands, bingo, and live concerts. As a county fair, it hosts animal shows, livestock contests, and 4H competitions, as well as the judging of baked goods, canned goods, quilts, vegetables, and photography.

== Camping ==
Camping at Grange Fair takes place in two forms: tenting and RV'ing in recreational vehicles.

It consists of thousands of people camping at the fairgrounds in one thousand large, green, blue, or tan rented canvas tents with asphalt floors. There are one thousand Five Hundred Recreational Vehicle spots, with thousands who stay in their own recreational vehicles, parked on the grounds. Most recreational vehicles are parked in rented locations that offer electric and plumbing hookups, but there are additional spaces available on a first-come-first-serve basis for a nightly fee. However, these "overflow camping" spots do not have electric or plumbing hookups.

The roughly 1000 tents are erected over the proceeding weeks by prisoners on work release from the nearby SCI Benner. Each tent is approximately 14 feet by 14 feet with a single 4 outlet electrical box in one corner. Because tent spots do not have running water, there are public water spigots with free potable water and public bathrooms in multiple locations. Tenters may pay once to have an extension added to the front and/or back of their asphalt pad. These extensions have set dimensions and tenters are responsible for devising a manner to cover their extensions. Tenters may not alter their tents or asphalt pads in any way.

Tent locations are often occupied by the same families down through generations. After the space for the tents reached maximum capacity, a wait list was started. The wait list was cancelled after 3 decades when it exceeded 500 families, some of which waited 27 years. Fairgoers can no longer apply for a tent. Invitations to hold a tent or RV location are solely at the discretion of the Fair Committee, however, both tenters and campers may lose their location for rule violations or for passing up their location for 2 fairs. A single person (or couple) may not rent both a tent and a camper spot.

Historically, those renting tents would move in on Wednesday with those renting spaces with campers move in starting as early as the Sunday before the fair opened officially on Thursday. Since 2015, the official tenter move-in date is Thursday, with the first day of the Fair starting on Friday, the next day. Tenters are permitted to enter the grounds on Sunday to put up their tent extensions and move in any large furniture. Neither campers nor tenters are permitted to occupy their encampments until their designated move-in day.
