= Centre Hall, Pennsylvania =

Borough in Pennsylvania, US

- Borough
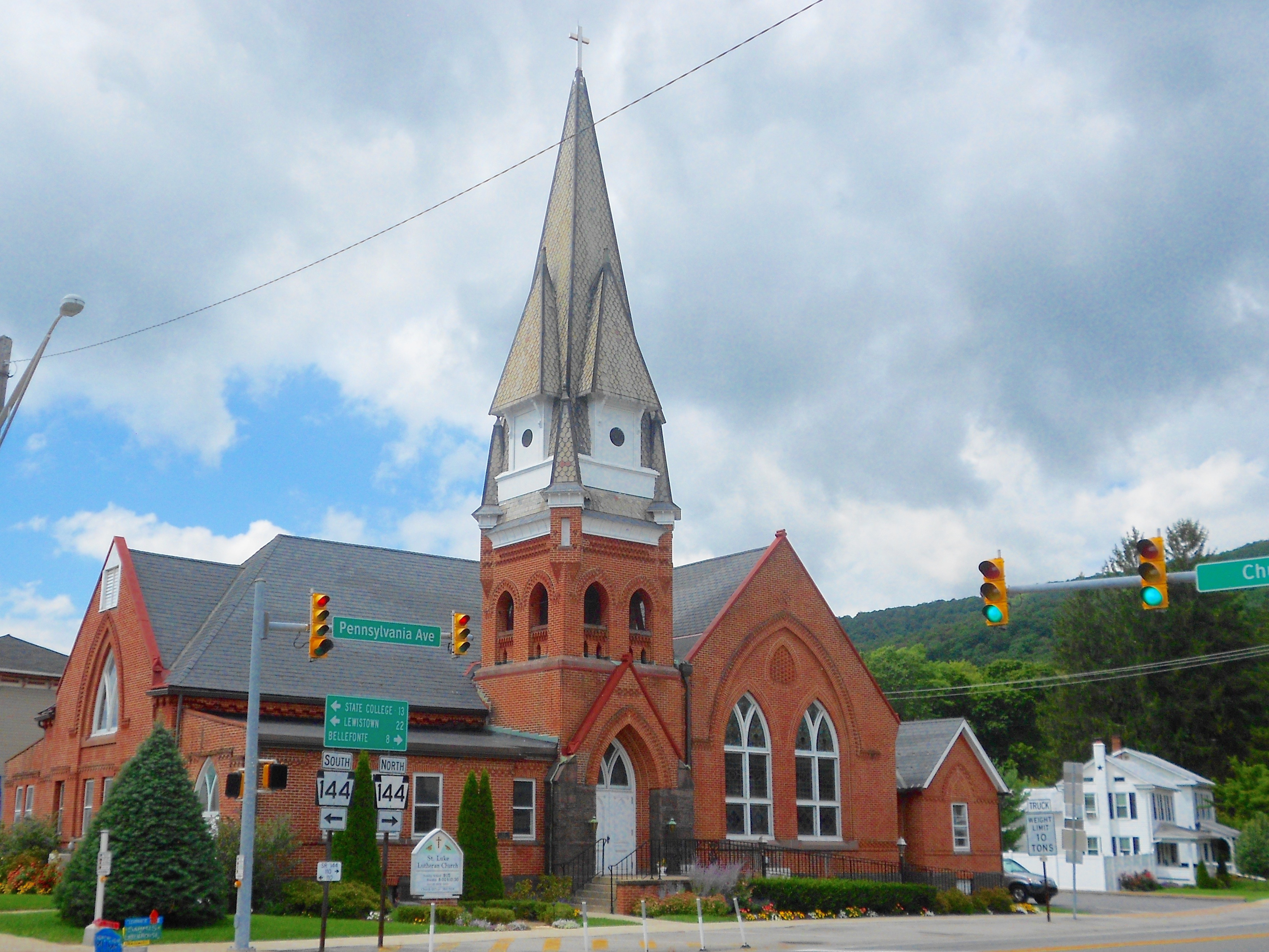
- St. Luke Lutheran Church on Pennsylvania Avenue in Centre Hall
- Motto: In the Centre of it all!
- Location of Centre Hall in Centre County, Pennsylvania.

- Map showing Centre County in Pennsylvania

- Location within the U.S. state of Pennsylvania Centre Hall (the United States)
- Coordinates: 40°50′39″N 77°41′05″W
- Country: United States
- State: Pennsylvania
- County: Centre
- Settled: 1847
- Incorporated (borough): 1881

Government
  - Mayor: LeDon Young

Area
  - Total: 0.61 sq mi (1.59 km^{2})
  - Land: 0.61 sq mi (1.59 km^{2})
  - Water: 0 sq mi (0.00 km^{2})
- Elevation: 1,319 ft (402 m)

Population (2020)
  - Total: 1,268
  - Density: 2,060/sq mi (795.4/km^{2})
- Time zone: Eastern (EST)
  - Summer (DST): EDT
- ZIP code: 16828
- Area code: 814
- FIPS code: 42-12376
- Website: Borough website

Centre Hall is a borough in Centre County, Pennsylvania, United States. It is located in Penns Valley and is part of the State College, Pennsylvania Metropolitan Statistical Area. As of the 2020 census, Centre Hall had a population of 1,268.

Centre Hall was so named on account of its location near the geographical center of Penns Valley.

== Geography ==
Centre Hall is located at 40°50′39″N 77°41′5″W (40.844287, -77.684615), surrounded by Potter Township.

According to the United States Census Bureau, the borough has a total area of 0.6 square miles (1.6 km^{2}), all land.

== Events ==
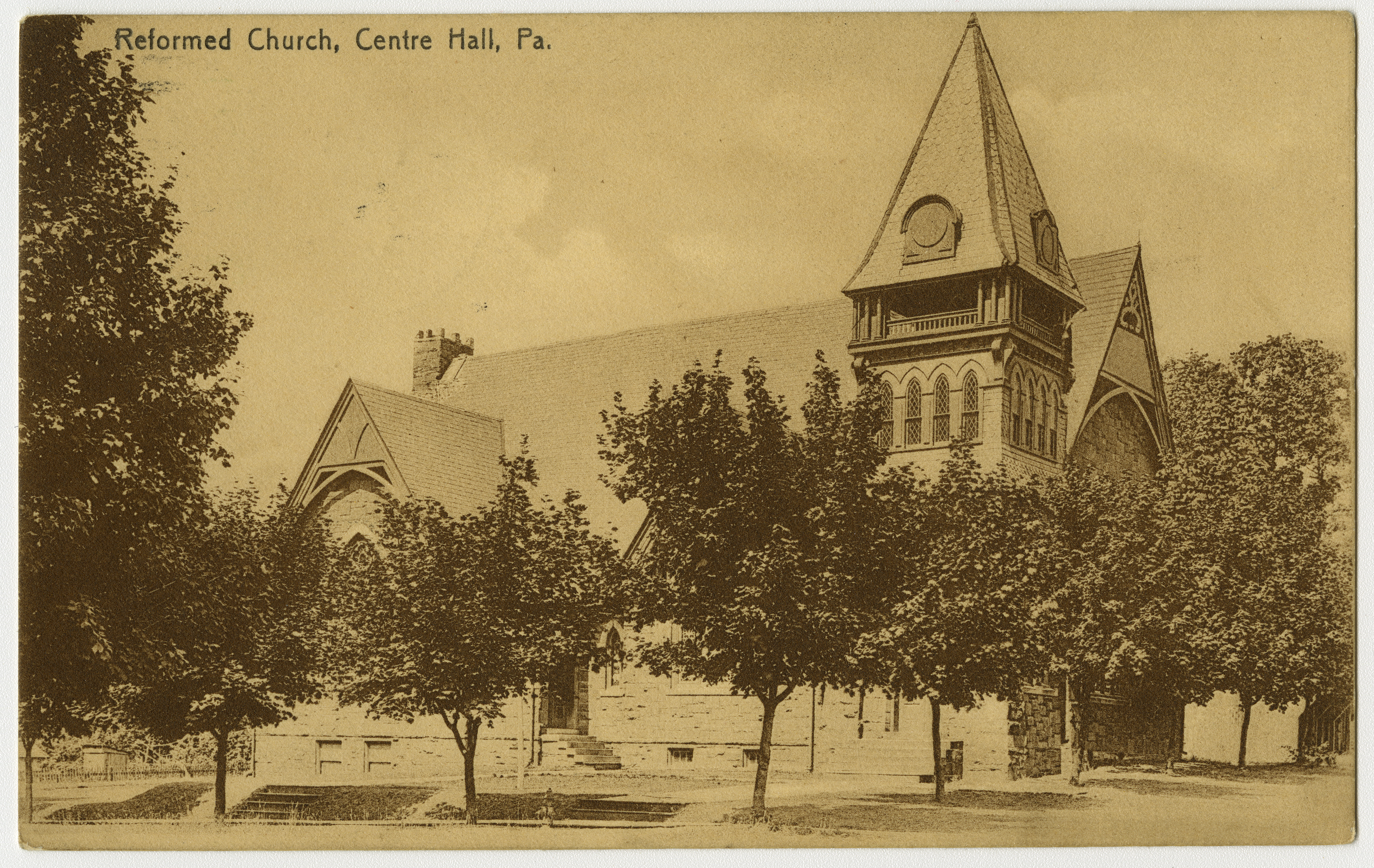
Centre Hall Reformed Church

Centre Hall hosts the Centre County Grange Encampment and Fair, known to most as the "Grange Fair". The Fair attracts tens of thousands of people during its run, and takes place during the last full Thursday-to-Thursday week in August annually. It is one of the few remaining tenting fairs in the United States, with nearly a thousand "army-style" tents laid in rows throughout the grounds. In 1874, Leonard Rhone, a local farmer and activist, urged that members of the local Granges that he had founded to invite their neighbors to a one-day Pic-Nic to introduce the Patrons of Husbandry organization for farm and rural families. With the exception of 1943, the Fair has been held every year since.

== Demographics ==
Historical population
Census	Pop.	Note	%±
1880	350		—
1890	441		26.0%
1900	537		21.8%
1910	500		−6.9%
1920	525		5.0%
1930	658		25.3%
1940	738		12.2%
1950	834		13.0%
1960	1,109		33.0%
1970	1,282		15.6%
1980	1,233		−3.8%
1990	1,203		−2.4%
2000	1,079		−10.3%
2010	1,265		17.2%
2020	1,268		0.2%

At the 2010 census there were 1,265 people, 548 households, and 372 families residing in the borough. The population density was 2,054.2 inhabitants per square mile (793.1/km^{2}). There were 574 housing units at an average density of 932.9 per square mile (360.2/km^{2}). The racial makeup of the borough was 99.0% White, 0.1% Black or African American, 0.1% Native American, 0.2% Asian, 0.1% other, and 0.5% from two or more races. There were 548 households, 26.6% had children under the age of 18 living with them, 56.0% were married couples living together, 3.3% had a male householder with no wife present, 8.6% had a female householder with no husband present, and 32.1% were non-families. 27.7% of households were made up of individuals, and 10.8% were one person aged 65 or older. The average household size was 2.31 and the average family size was 2.81.

In the borough the population was spread out, with 20.1% under the age of 18, 6.7% from 18 to 24, 26.2% from 25 to 44, 26.0% from 45 to 64, and 21.0% 65 or older. The median age was 43 years. For every 100 females there were 88.2 males. For every 100 females age 18 and over, there were 87.6 males.

The median household income was $50,556 and the median family income was $64,141. The per capita income for the borough was $25,298. About 4.7% of families and 6.0% of the population were below the poverty line, including 11.9% of those under age 18 and 1.9% of those age 65 or over.

== Transportation ==
=== Rail ===
In 1884, the Lewisburg and Tyrone Railroad was constructed through Centre Hall. Rail service ended due to damage from Hurricane Agnes in June 1972, and the line was formally abandoned by the Penn Central in May 1973.

=== Roads ===
Highways include:

- Pennsylvania Route 144
- Pennsylvania Route 192

=== Air ===
Centre Airpark (FAA LID: N16) is a small airport with a 3100 ft grass runway just southeast of Centre Hall. Its use includes ultralight aircraft.

== Education ==
Centre Hall is in the Penns Valley Area School District.
