= National Register of Historic Places listings in Centre County, Pennsylvania =

Location of Centre County in Pennsylvania

This is a list of the National Register of Historic Places listings in Centre County, Pennsylvania.

This is intended to be a complete list of the properties and districts on the National Register of Historic Places in Centre County, Pennsylvania, United States. The locations of National Register properties and districts for which the latitude and longitude coordinates are included below, may be seen in a map.

There are 64 properties and districts listed on the National Register in the county. Another 2 properties were once listed but have been removed.

This National Park Service list is complete through NPS recent listings posted May 1, 2026.

== Current listings ==
	Name on the Register	Image	Date listed	Location	Municipality	Description
1	Aaronsburg Historic District	Aaronsburg Historic District	September 2, 1980 (#80003452)	Pennsylvania Route 45 in Aaronsburg; 40°54′02″N 77°27′10″W	Haines Township	
2	Ag Hill Complex	Ag Hill Complex	January 22, 1979 (#79002191)	Penn State University campus 40°47′59″N 77°51′54″W	State College	
3	William Allison House	William Allison House	April 18, 1977 (#77001146)	1 mile (1.6 km) west of Spring Mills on Pennsylvania Route 45; 40°51′05″N 77°34′55″W	Gregg Township	
4	Bucher Ayres Farm	Bucher Ayres Farm	December 1, 1980 (#80003453)	Southwest of Pine Grove Mills on Whitehall Road, Pennsylvania Furnace; 40°43′21″N 77°57′54″W	Ferguson Township	
5	Christian Bechdel II House	Christian Bechdel II House	March 1, 1982 (#82003775)	South of Blanchard on Liberty Road; 41°03′31″N 77°36′16″W	Liberty Township	
6	William Henry and Clara Singer Beck Farm		August 31, 2017 (#100001570)	950 Snydertown Rd., southeast of Howard; 40°59′13″N 77°34′39″W	Walker Township	
7	Bellefonte Armory	Bellefonte Armory	December 22, 1989 (#89002068)	East Bishop Street; 40°54′55″N 77°45′25″W	Bellefonte	
8	Bellefonte Forge House	Bellefonte Forge House	August 20, 1999 (#99001020)	4098 Axemann Road; 40°54′21″N 77°46′41″W	Spring Township	
9	Bellefonte Historic District	Bellefonte Historic District	August 12, 1977 (#77001136)	Roughly bounded by Stony Batter, Ardell Alley, Thomas, Armor, Penn, Ridge and Logan Streets; 40°54′48″N 77°46′43″W	Bellefonte	
10	Black Moshannon State Park Day Use District	Black Moshannon State Park Day Use District	February 12, 1987 (#87000101)	9 miles (14 km) east of Philipsburg on Pennsylvania Route 504; 40°54′57″N 78°03′46″W	Rush Township	
11	Black Moshannon State Park Family Cabin District	Black Moshannon State Park Family Cabin District	February 12, 1987 (#87000102)	9 miles (14 km) east of Philipsburg on Pennsylvania Route 504; 40°54′48″N 78°03′45″W	Rush Township	
12	Black Moshannon State Park Maintenance District	Black Moshannon State Park Maintenance District	February 12, 1987 (#87000097)	9 miles (14 km) east of Philipsburg on Pennsylvania Route 504; 40°55′15″N 78°04′24″W	Rush Township	
13	Boal Mansion	Boal Mansion	December 4, 1978 (#78002361)	U.S. Route 322 and Pennsylvania Route 45 in Boalsburg; 40°46′44″N 77°48′01″W	Harris Township	
14	Boalsburg Historic District	Boalsburg Historic District	December 12, 1977 (#77001139)	U.S. Route 322 in Boalsburg; 40°46′34″N 77°47′38″W	Harris Township	
15	Brockerhoff Hotel	Brockerhoff Hotel	April 11, 1977 (#77001137)	High and Allegheny Streets; 40°54′42″N 77°46′42″W	Bellefonte	
16	Brockerhoff Mill	Brockerhoff Mill	May 1, 1979 (#79002180)	Southwest of Bellefonte on Pennsylvania Route 550; 40°54′01″N 77°47′58″W	Benner Township	
17	Camelot	Camelot	April 26, 1979 (#79002192)	520 South Fraser Street; 40°47′20″N 77°51′29″W	State College	
18	Centre County Courthouse	Centre County Courthouse	November 7, 1976 (#76001618)	High Street; 40°54′43″N 77°46′40″W	Bellefonte	
19	Centre Furnace Mansion House	Centre Furnace Mansion House	December 27, 1979 (#79002193)	1001 East College Avenue; 40°48′23″N 77°50′33″W	State College	
20	Centre Mills	Centre Mills	December 12, 1976 (#76001621)	Southwest of Rebersburg off Pennsylvania Route 445; 40°55′32″N 77°28′21″W	Miles Township	
21	College Heights Historic District	College Heights Historic District	April 27, 1995 (#95000514)	Roughly bounded by Holmes Street, Park Avenue, Ridge Avenuie, Sunset Road, Hillcrest Avenue, Woodland Drive and Mitchell Avenue; 40°47′57″N 77°52′28″W	State College	
22	Curtin Village	Curtin Village	March 11, 1971 (#71000687)	Off U.S. Route 220; 40°58′26″N 77°44′33″W	Boggs Township	
23	Felix Dale Stone House	Felix Dale Stone House	April 20, 1982 (#82003777)	Pennsylvania Route 871, south of Lemont; 40°48′11″N 77°48′49″W	College Township	
24	Egg Hill Church	Egg Hill Church	June 4, 1979 (#79002189)	Southwest of Spring Mills on Egg Hill Road; 40°49′42″N 77°37′32″W	Potter Township	
25	Abraham Elder Stone House	Abraham Elder Stone House	April 13, 1977 (#77001148)	Pennsylvania Route 550 at Stormstown; 40°47′43″N 78°00′46″W	Halfmoon Township	
26	Farmers' High School	Farmers' High School	September 11, 1981 (#81000538)	College Avenue and Atherton Street; 40°47′39″N 77°51′55″W	State College	
27	Fisher Farm Site	Fisher Farm Site	March 3, 1982 (#82003781)	Along U.S. Route 220, straddling a rail line 40°54′15″N 77°52′40″W	Unionville	
28	Maj. Jared B. Fisher House	Maj. Jared B. Fisher House	September 14, 1977 (#77001147)	Northeast of Spring Mills on Pennsylvania Route 45; 40°51′42″N 77°33′22″W	Gregg Township	
29	Gamble Mill	Gamble Mill	August 1, 1975 (#75001627)	Dunlap and Lamb Streets; 40°54′50″N 77°47′01″W	Bellefonte	
30	John Gray House	John Gray House	April 3, 1975 (#75001628)	East of Port Matilda off Pennsylvania Route 550, south of U.S. Route 220; 40°49′28″N 77°58′29″W	Patton Township	
31	Andrew Gregg Homestead	Andrew Gregg Homestead	July 28, 1977 (#77001141)	2 miles (3.2 km) east of Centre Hall off Pennsylvania Route 192; 40°51′53″N 77°38′22″W	Potter Township	
32	Harmony Forge Mansion	Harmony Forge Mansion	October 16, 1979 (#79002183)	South of Milesburg on Pennsylvania Route 144; 40°56′05″N 77°47′12″W	Boggs Township	
33	Hill House	Hill House	March 28, 1977 (#77001140)	Tennis Street in Boalsburg; 40°46′22″N 77°47′43″W	Harris Township	
34	Holmes-Foster-Highlands Historic District	Holmes-Foster-Highlands Historic District	April 27, 1995 (#95000513)	Roughly bounded by Buckhout Street, Railroad and Highland Avenues, High and Keller Streets, and Irvin and Prospect Avenues; 40°47′31″N 77°51′39″W	State College	
35	Houserville Site (36CE65)	Houserville Site (36CE65)	March 6, 1986 (#86000401)	1300 block of East College Avenue, east of State College; 40°48′42″N 77°50′04″W	College Township	
36	Iddings-Baldridge House	Iddings-Baldridge House	July 29, 1977 (#77001145)	Railroad Street; 40°56′34″N 77°47′47″W	Milesburg	
37	Lemont Historic District	Lemont Historic District	June 6, 1979 (#79002182)	Off Pennsylvania Route 26 in Lemont; 40°48′37″N 77°49′08″W	College Township	
38	Linden Hall Historic District	Linden Hall Historic District	September 5, 1990 (#90001409)	Rock Hill Road between Linden Hall and Brush Valley Roads in Linden Hall; 40°47′52″N 77°45′45″W	Harris Township	
39	Logan Furnace Mansion	Logan Furnace Mansion	April 11, 1977 (#77001138)	3 miles (4.8 km) south of Bellefonte on Pennsylvania Route 144; 40°52′38″N 77°45′51″W	Spring Township	
40	Marsh Creek Advent Church		November 21, 2022 (#100008385)	1303 Moose Run Rd. 40°58′34″N 77°48′49″W	Bellefonte	
41	McAllister-Beaver House	McAllister-Beaver House	February 24, 1982 (#82003774)	817 East Bishop Street; 40°54′49″N 77°45′52″W	Bellefonte	
42	Miles-Humes House	Miles-Humes House	October 21, 1976 (#76001619)	203 North Allegheny Street; 40°54′48″N 77°46′45″W	Bellefonte	
43	Millheim Historic District	Millheim Historic District	March 25, 1986 (#86000787)	Pennsylvania Routes 45 and 445; 40°53′34″N 77°28′38″W	Millheim	
44	Neff Round Barn	Neff Round Barn	May 2, 1979 (#79002181)	South of Centre Hall off Pennsylvania Route 45; 40°49′03″N 77°42′06″W	Potter Township	
45	Maj. John Neff Homestead	Maj. John Neff Homestead	April 11, 1977 (#77001142)	Southwest of Centre Hall; 40°49′17″N 77°43′38″W	Potter Township	
46	Oak Hall Historic District	Oak Hall Historic District	October 25, 1979 (#79002185)	Pennsylvania Route 871 in Oak Hall; 40°47′37″N 77°48′18″W	College Township	
47	Penn's Cave and Hotel	Penn's Cave and Hotel	April 14, 1978 (#78002363)	5 miles (8.0 km) east of Centre Hall off Pennsylvania Route 192; 40°52′58″N 77°36′36″W	Gregg Township	
48	Pennsylvania Match Company	Pennsylvania Match Company	September 7, 2001 (#01000954)	367 Phoenix Avenue; 40°54′31″N 77°46′59″W	Bellefonte	
49	Hardman Philips House	Hardman Philips House	September 18, 1978 (#78002364)	Presquisle and 4th Streets; 40°53′48″N 78°13′11″W	Philipsburg	
50	Philipsburg Historic District	Philipsburg Historic District	July 22, 1999 (#99000881)	Roughly bounded by East Presqueisle Street, Hillcrest Drive, Oak, Railroad, Spruce and Laurel Streets; 40°54′00″N 78°13′00″W	Philipsburg	
51	Simon Pickle Stone House	Simon Pickle Stone House	April 18, 1977 (#77001144)	Junction of Pennsylvania Routes 192 and 445 at Madisonburg; 40°55′24″N 77°30′54″W	Miles Township	
52	Potter-Allison Farm		December 6, 1977 (#77001143)	Southeast of Centre Hall on Pennsylvania Route 144; 40°48′06″N 77°37′51″W	Potter Township	
53	Rebersburg Historic District	Rebersburg Historic District	December 7, 1979 (#79002188)	Pennsylvania Route 192 in Rebersburg; 40°56′40″N 77°26′35″W	Miles Township	
54	Leonard Rhone House		October 31, 1985 (#85003448)	Off Pennsylvania Route 45; 40°48′32″N 77°43′16″W	Potter Township	
55	Rowland Theater	Rowland Theater	October 18, 1979 (#79002186)	Front Street; 40°53′47″N 78°13′25″W	Philipsburg	
56	South Ward School	South Ward School	February 23, 1978 (#78002360)	Bishop Street; 40°54′40″N 77°46′23″W	Bellefonte	
57	William Thomas House	William Thomas House	November 13, 1976 (#76001620)	266 North Thomas Street; 40°54′54″N 77°47′09″W	Bellefonte	
58	Gen. John Thompson House	Gen. John Thompson House	March 29, 1978 (#78002366)	East Branch Road, east of State College; 40°47′25″N 77°49′56″W	College Township	
59	Tudek Site	Tudek Site	February 12, 1982 (#82003778)	Along Orchard Road, northeast of State College; 40°49′01″N 77°51′03″W	College Township	
60	Union Church and Burial Ground	Union Church and Burial Ground	May 23, 1978 (#78002365)	East Presqueisle Street; 40°53′53″N 78°13′04″W	Philipsburg	
61	Unionville Historic District	Unionville Historic District	May 30, 1979 (#79002194)	U.S. Route 220 and Pennsylvania Route 504; 40°54′22″N 77°52′34″W	Unionville	
62	Daniel Waggoner Log House and Barn		April 18, 1979 (#79002190)	Southwest of Spring Mills; 40°49′52″N 77°37′11″W	Potter Township	
63	George Wilson Homestead	George Wilson Homestead	February 24, 1982 (#82003776)	Southwest of Centennial on Pennsylvania Route 550; 40°45′19″N 78°04′05″W	Halfmoon Township	
64	Woodward Inn	Woodward Inn	December 18, 1978 (#78002367)	Pennsylvania Route 45 at Woodward; 40°53′55″N 77°21′25″W	Haines Township	

== Former listings ==
	Name on the Register	Image	Date listed	Date removed	Location	City or town	Description
1	Bellefonte Academy		November 7, 1976 (#76001617)	December 24, 2008	225 West Bishop Street; 40°54′37″N 77°46′48″W	Bellefonte	Destroyed by fire on July 14, 2004.
2	James Beck Round Barn		February 17, 1978 (#78002362)	June 27, 1986	3.2 miles (5.1 km) east of Centre Hall on Pennsylvania Route 192	Potter Township	Destroyed in a thunderstorm in May, 1984.

== See also ==
- List of National Historic Landmarks in Pennsylvania
- National Register of Historic Places listings in Pennsylvania
- List of Pennsylvania state historical markers in Centre County
