= Holmes–Foster–Highlands Historic District =

Historic district in Pennsylvania, United States

- U.S. National Register of Historic Places
- U.S. Historic district
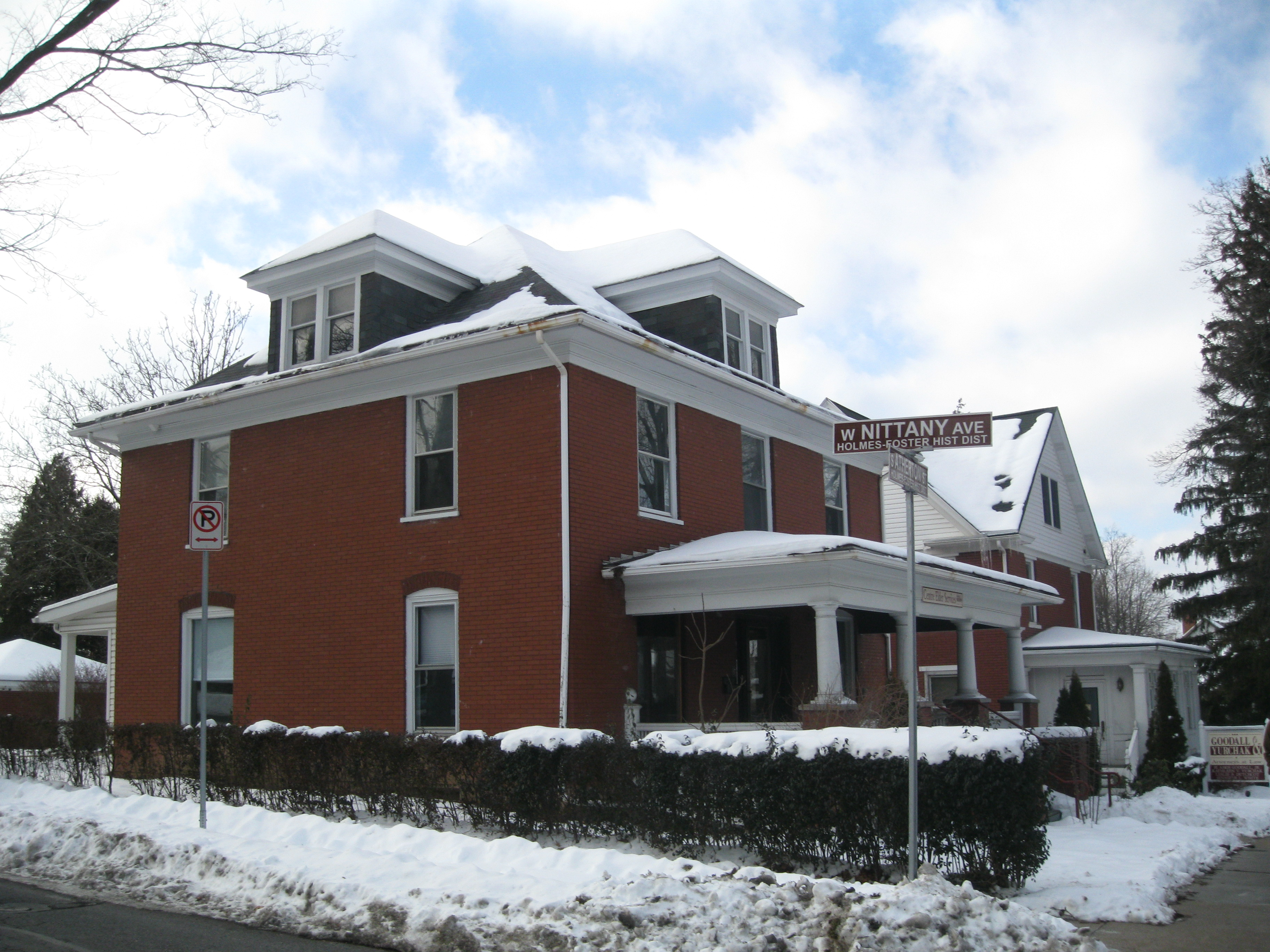
- Houses at the corner of W. Nittany Ave. and S. Atherton St. in 2013

- Location within Pennsylvania Location within the United States
- Location: Roughly bounded by Buckhout St., Railroad and Highland Aves., High and Keller Sts., and Irvin and Prospect Aves., State College, Pennsylvania
- Coordinates: 40°47′31″N 77°51′39″W
- Area: 321 acres (130 ha)
- Built: 1896
- Architect: Multiple
- Architectural style: Bungalow/craftsman, Tudor Revival, Colonial Revival
- NRHP reference No.: 95000513
- Added to NRHP: April 27, 1995

The Holmes–Foster–Highlands Historic District is a national historic district located in State College, Centre County, Pennsylvania.

It was added to the National Register of Historic Places in 1995.

== History and architectural features ==
The district includes 727 contributing buildings located in two residential areas of State College: Holmes–Foster and the Highlands. The district reflects the growth and development of State College as an emerging college town.

The houses are largely wood frame and exhibit a number of popular early twentieth-century architectural styles including Colonial Revival, Tudor Revival, and Bungalow. Non-residential buildings include two schools, three churches, a few shops, and the high school football stadium, Memorial Field. Also located in the district is the separately listed Camelot.
