= James Beck Round Barn =

- Formerly listed on the U.S. National Register of Historic Places
- Location within Pennsylvania Location within the United States
- Location: 3.2 miles (5.1 km) east of Centre Hall on Pennsylvania Route 192, Potter Township, Pennsylvania
- Coordinates: 40.901131°N 77.583464°W
- Area: 0.2 acres (0.081 ha)
- Built: 1913
- Built by: Aaron Thomas
- NRHP reference No.: 78002362

Significant dates
- Added to NRHP: February 17, 1978
- Removed from NRHP: June 27, 1986

The James Beck Round Barn was an historic round barn that was located in Potter Township, Centre County, Pennsylvania. It was added to the National Register of Historic Places in 1978.

It stood for seventy-five years, but it was leveled after sustaining severe damage to the roof during a thunderstorm in 1984. The site was then delisted in 1986.

== History ==
The Commonwealth of Pennsylvania is currently home to more than 150 round barns and similar (i.e., octagonal) structures, the construction of which has spanned the course of nearly 200 years. Found across fifty-four of the state's sixty-seven counties, three such buildings have existed in Centre County. Two of these were registered as places of historical significance: the Neff Round Barn, located west of Centre Hall, and the James Beck Round Barn, east of Centre Hall.

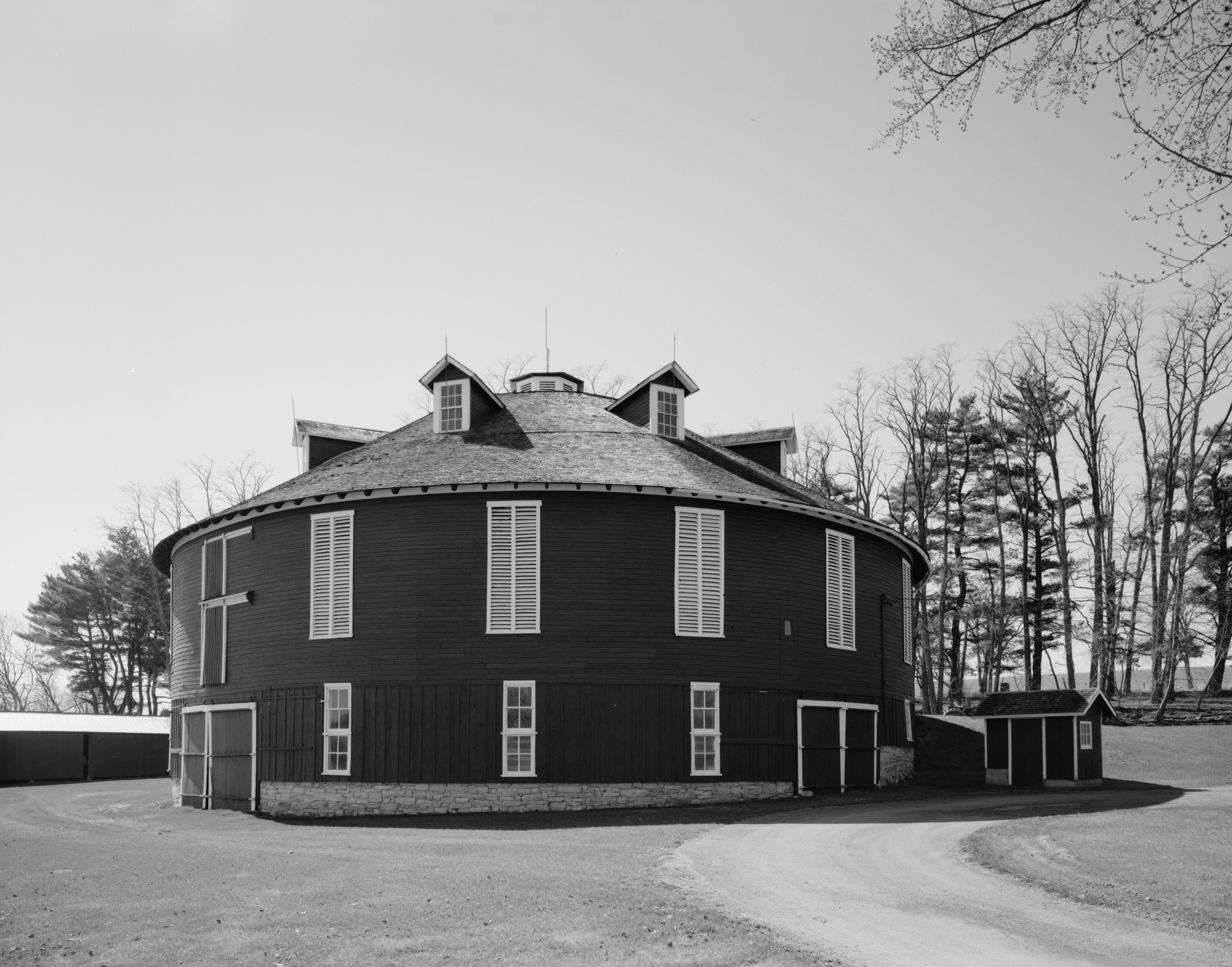
The Neff Round Barn, which still survives, was built by the same builder as the Beck Round Barn

The Beck Round Barn was built in 1913 by Aaron Thomas, who built the Calvin Neff Round Barn in Potter Township in 1910. The Beck property stood in Penns Valley near East Penns Canal, 6.7 miles from Centre Hall on the north side of Route 192. Like the Neff, it was a true round barn, i.e., no angles featured in the construction of its (circumferential) perimeter. The Beck measured seventy feet in diameter and fifty feet in height, had a conical roof with four gabled dormers and a cupola. Its interior had two levels, a lower cattle floor and a mow floor above, and a central silo. The unpainted exterior was clad in vertical siding on the ground floor and horizontal on the upper.

== Description ==
Local-area historian Harry Ward, board president of the Penns Valley Area Historical Museum Association, describes the barn's construction:

"The top story was supported by timbers radiating outward from a central silo and resting on three concentric sills, which were each laminated from eight boards bent into a curve after soaking in water. Tapered radial rafters supported the shingled roof, which featured four windowed dormers. The peak of the roof featured a cupola, which was later replaced by a modern ventilator, and the central silo was removed." The James Beck Round barn had, at one time, been in the ownership of Ward's great-grandparents.
