= Maj. Jared B. Fisher House =

Historic house in Pennsylvania, United States

- U.S. National Register of Historic Places
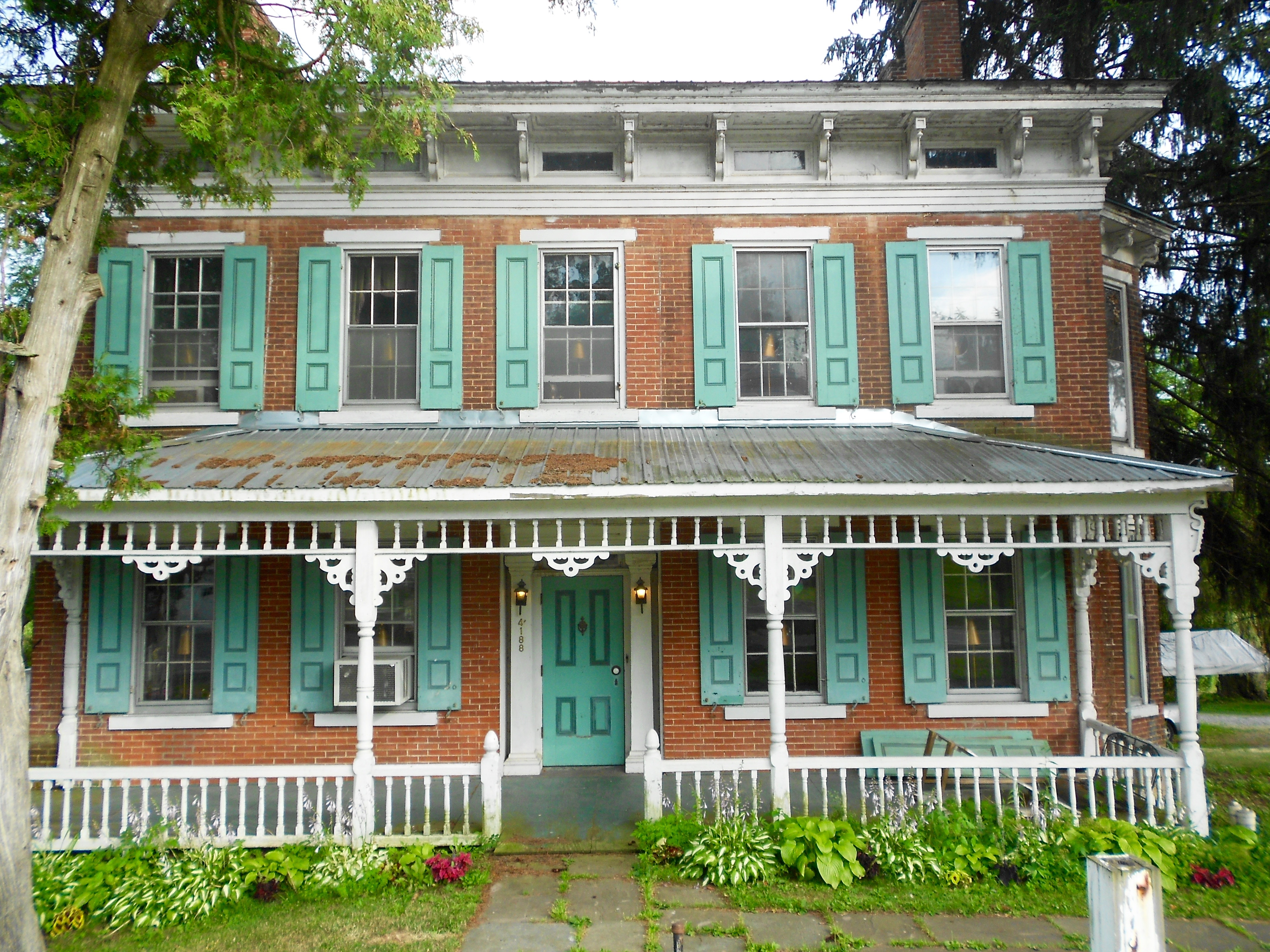
- Front of house

- Location within Pennsylvania Location within the United States
- Location: Northeast of Spring Mills on Pennsylvania Route 45, Gregg Township, Pennsylvania
- Coordinates: 40°51′42″N 77°33′22″W
- Area: 1 acre (0.40 ha)
- Built: 1856
- Architectural style: Greek Revival, Gothic Revival
- NRHP reference No.: 77001147
- Added to NRHP: September 14, 1977

The Maj. Jared B. Fisher House is an historic home that is located in Gregg Township, Centre County, Pennsylvania, United States.

It was added to the National Register of Historic Places in 1977.

== History and architectural features ==
Built in 1856, this historic structure is a 2½-story, five-bay, brick building with a gable roof. It has a rear kitchen wing with an attached brick, summer kitchen. The building reflects an eclectic combination of Greek Revival and Gothic Revival style architecture.

== Gallery ==
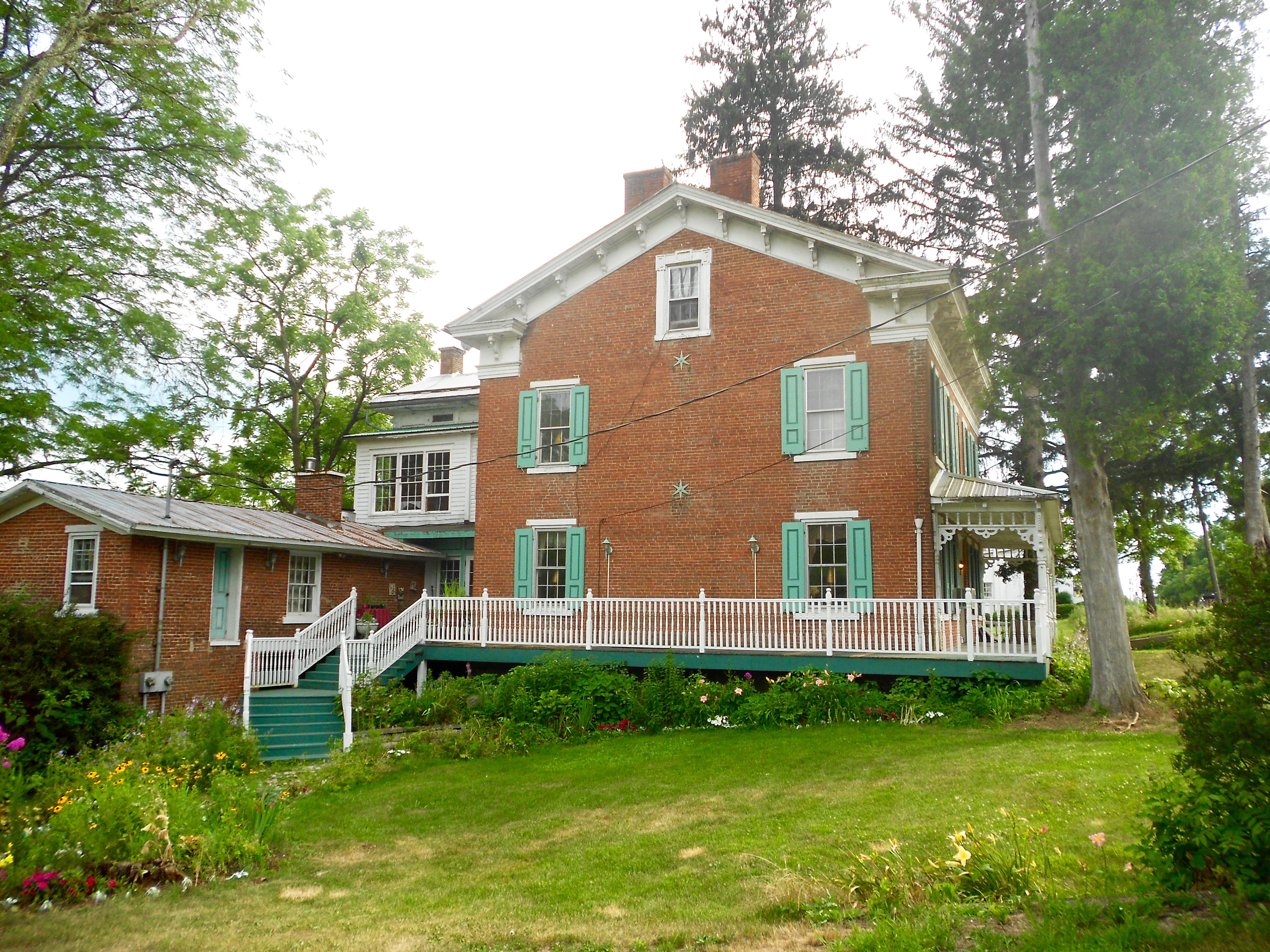
