= Gregg Township, Centre County, Pennsylvania =

Township in Pennsylvania, US

Coordinates: 40°53′00″N 77°37′59″W

- Township
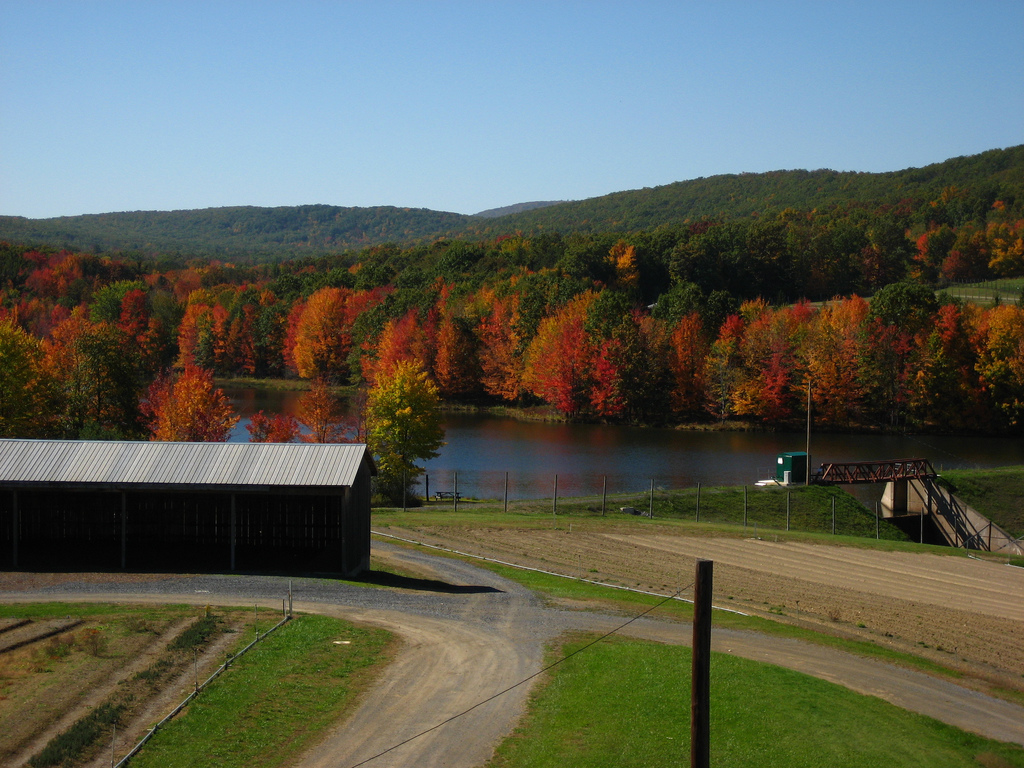
- Near US 322 in the Seven Mountains

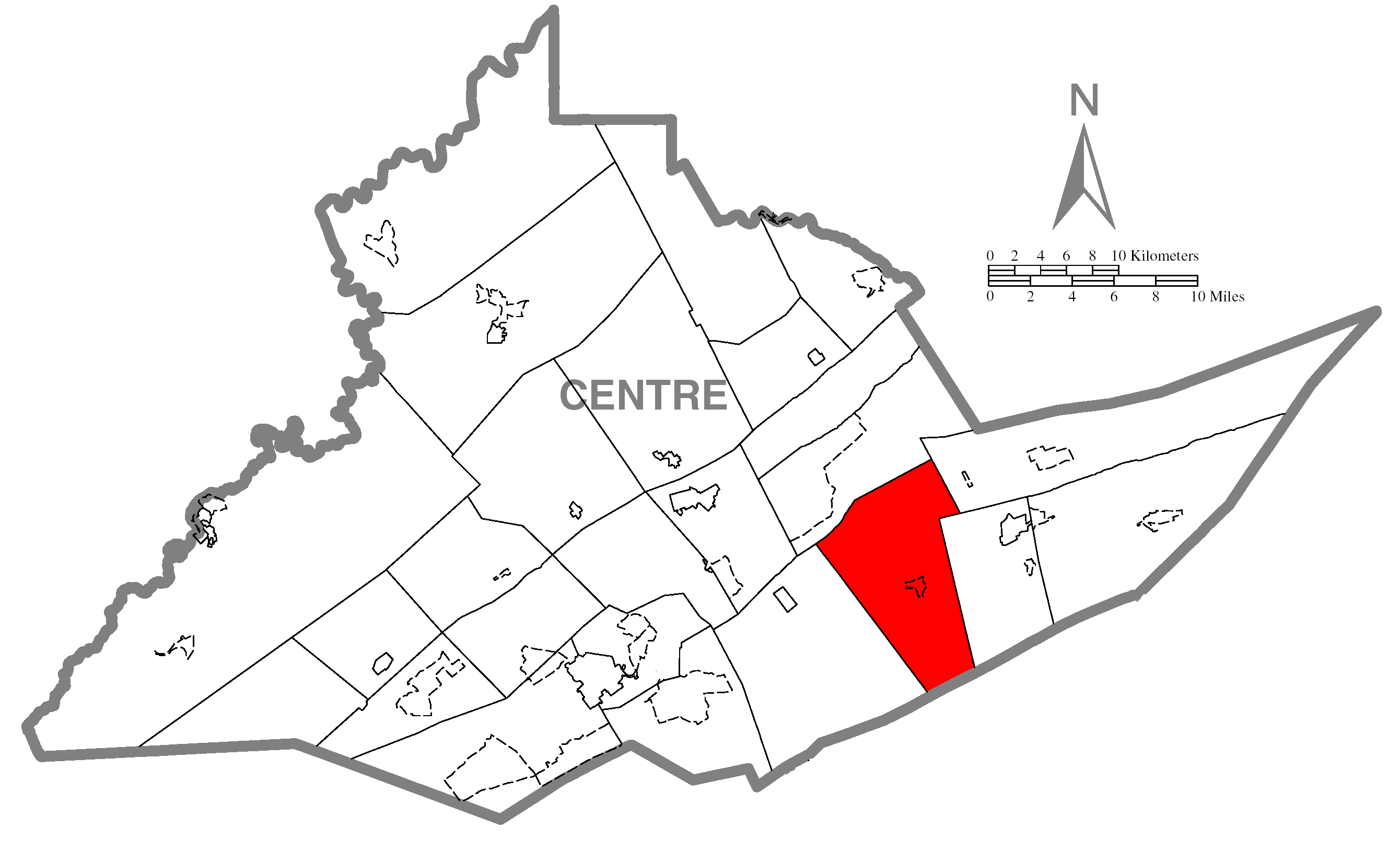
- Map of Centre County, Pennsylvania highlighting Gregg Township

- Map of Centre County, Pennsylvania
- Country: United States
- State: Pennsylvania
- County: Centre
- Settled: 1766
- Incorporated: 1826

Government
  - Type: Board of Supervisors
  - Chair: Keri Miller
  - Vice-Chair: Douglas Bierly
  - Roadmaster: Brandon Ripka

Area
  - Total: 46.76 sq mi (121.11 km^{2})
  - Land: 46.75 sq mi (121.09 km^{2})
  - Water: 0.012 sq mi (0.03 km^{2})

Population (2020)
  - Total: 2,287 ▼
  - Estimate (2021): 2,267
  - Density: 51.6/sq mi (19.91/km^{2})
- Time zone: UTC-5 (EST)
  - Summer (DST): UTC-4 (EDT)
- Zip code: 16875
- Area code: 814
- FIPS code: 42-027-31472
- Website: www.greggtownship.org

Gregg Township is a township in Centre County, Pennsylvania, United States. It is part of the State College, Pennsylvania Metropolitan Statistical Area. The population was 2,287 at the 2020 census.

== History ==
According to a post office directory published in Bellefonte, Pennsylvania with data from the 1890 United States census:

"Gregg Township was erected in November, 1826, out of portions of Potter, Miles and Haines townships and named in honor of Hon. Andrew Gregg, a resident of the township who had been a member of Congress from 1791 for sixteen years and United States Senator from 1807 to 1813. Its earliest settlers were George Woods in 1774, and George McCormick who settled at Spring Mills in 1773 and built the first mill there. It is a rich agricultural township. Penn's creek rises in the northern portion, its source a miniature lake in a cave. Penns Cave is now a noted place of resort. Township post-offices are Spring Mills, Farmers Mills, and Penn Hall."

The William Allison House and Maj. Jared B. Fisher House were added to the National Register of Historic Places in 1977. Penn's Cave and Hotel was added in 1978.

== Geography ==
Historical population
Census	Pop.	Note	%±
2000	2,119		—
2010	2,405		13.5%
2020	2,287		−4.9%
2021 (est.)	2,267		−0.9%
U.S. Decennial Census

According to the United States Census Bureau, the township has a total area of 46.8 square miles (121.1 km^{2}), of which 0.01 square miles (0.02 km^{2}), or 0.02%, is water.

Gregg Township is bordered by Walker Township to the north, Miles and Penn townships to the east, Mifflin County to the south and Potter Township to the west. It is part of the Penns Valley region of Centre County.

== Demographics ==
As of the census of 2000, there were 2,119 people, 785 households, and 606 families residing in the township. The population density was 46.6 inhabitants per square mile (18.0/km^{2}). There were 927 housing units at an average density of 20.4/sq mi (7.9/km^{2}). The racial makeup of the township was 99.24% White, 0.14% Native American, 0.24% Asian, 0.24% Pacific Islander, 0.05% from other races, and 0.09% from two or more races. Hispanic or Latino of any race were 0.42% of the population.

There were 785 households, out of which 34.5% had children under the age of 18 living with them, 67.5% were married couples living together, 6.4% had a female householder with no husband present, and 22.8% were non-families. 19.2% of all households were made up of individuals, and 7.1% had someone living alone who was 65 years of age or older. The average household size was 2.70 and the average family size was 3.11.

In the township the population was spread out, with 26.7% under the age of 18, 6.4% from 18 to 24, 30.0% from 25 to 44, 24.7% from 45 to 64, and 12.2% who were 65 years of age or older. The median age was 37 years. For every 100 females, there were 105.1 males. For every 100 females age 18 and over, there were 100.5 males.

The median income for a household in the township was $40,858, and the median income for a family was $44,063. Males had a median income of $29,702 versus $23,400 for females. The per capita income for the township was $17,504. About 4.5% of families and 5.9% of the population were below the poverty line, including 8.0% of those under age 18 and 5.9% of those age 65 or over.

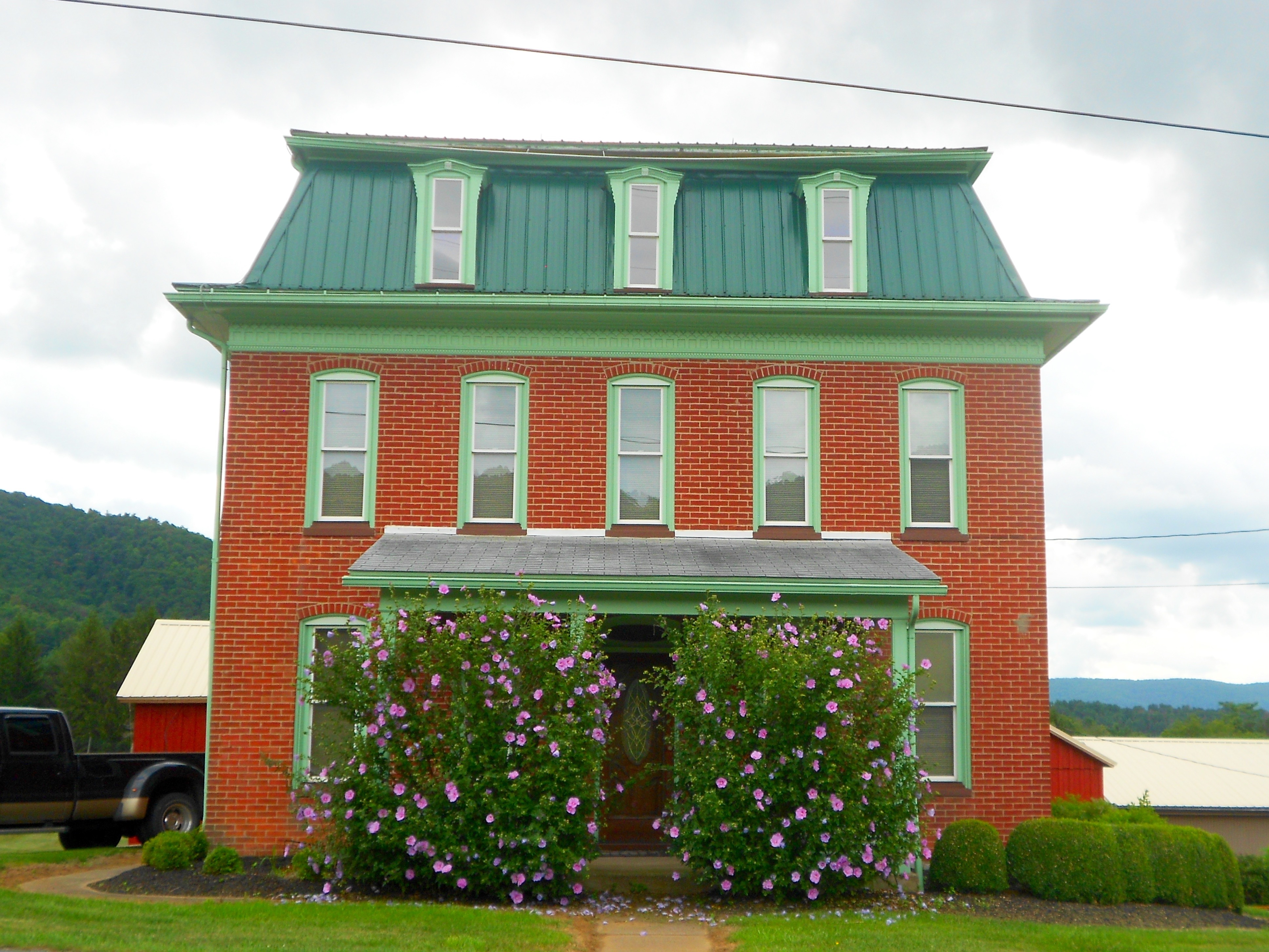
House on Route 192

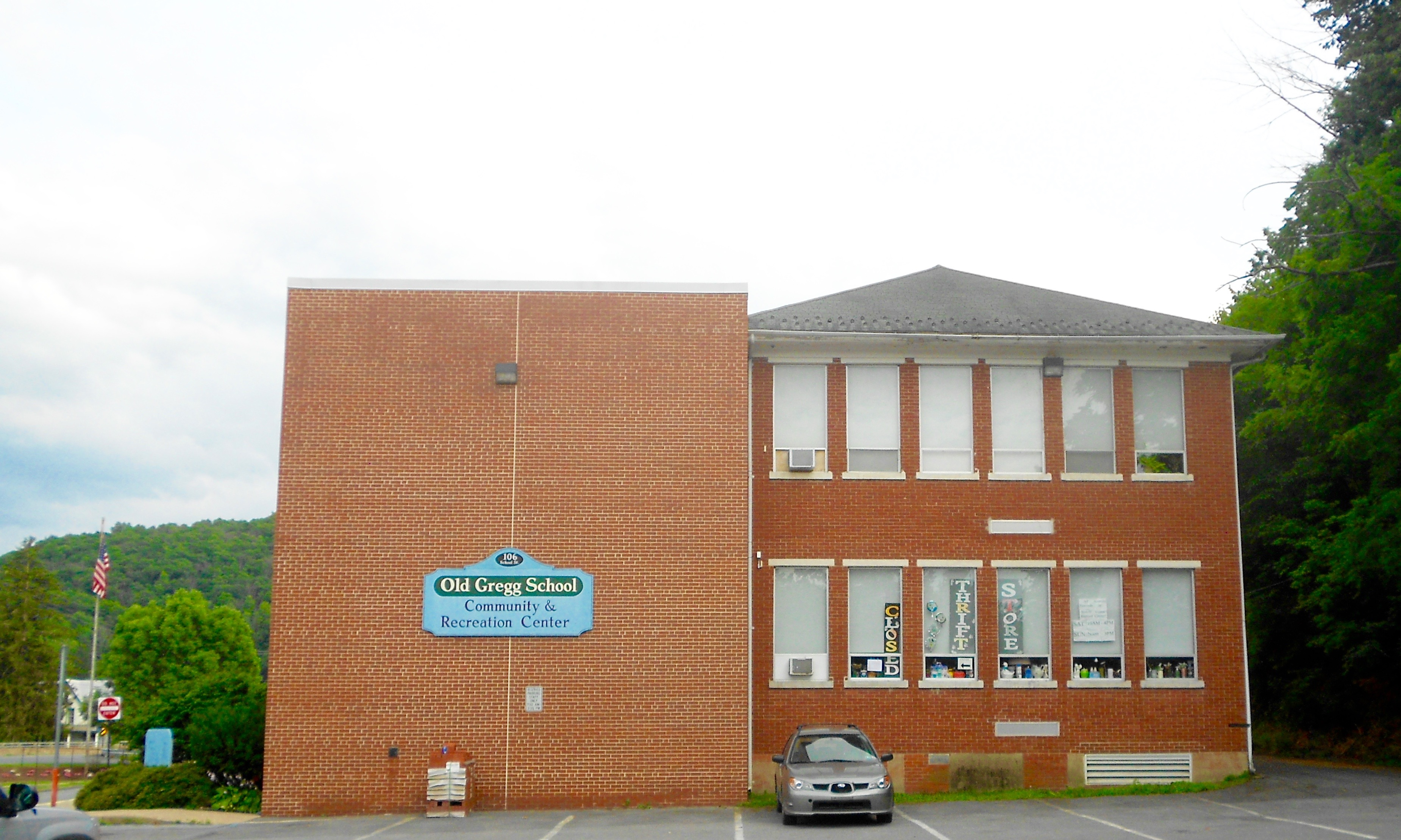
Old Gregg School Community Center in Spring Mills

== Education ==
Gregg Township is in the Penns Valley Area School District.
