= Linden Hall Historic District =

Historic district in Pennsylvania, United States

- U.S. National Register of Historic Places
- U.S. Historic district
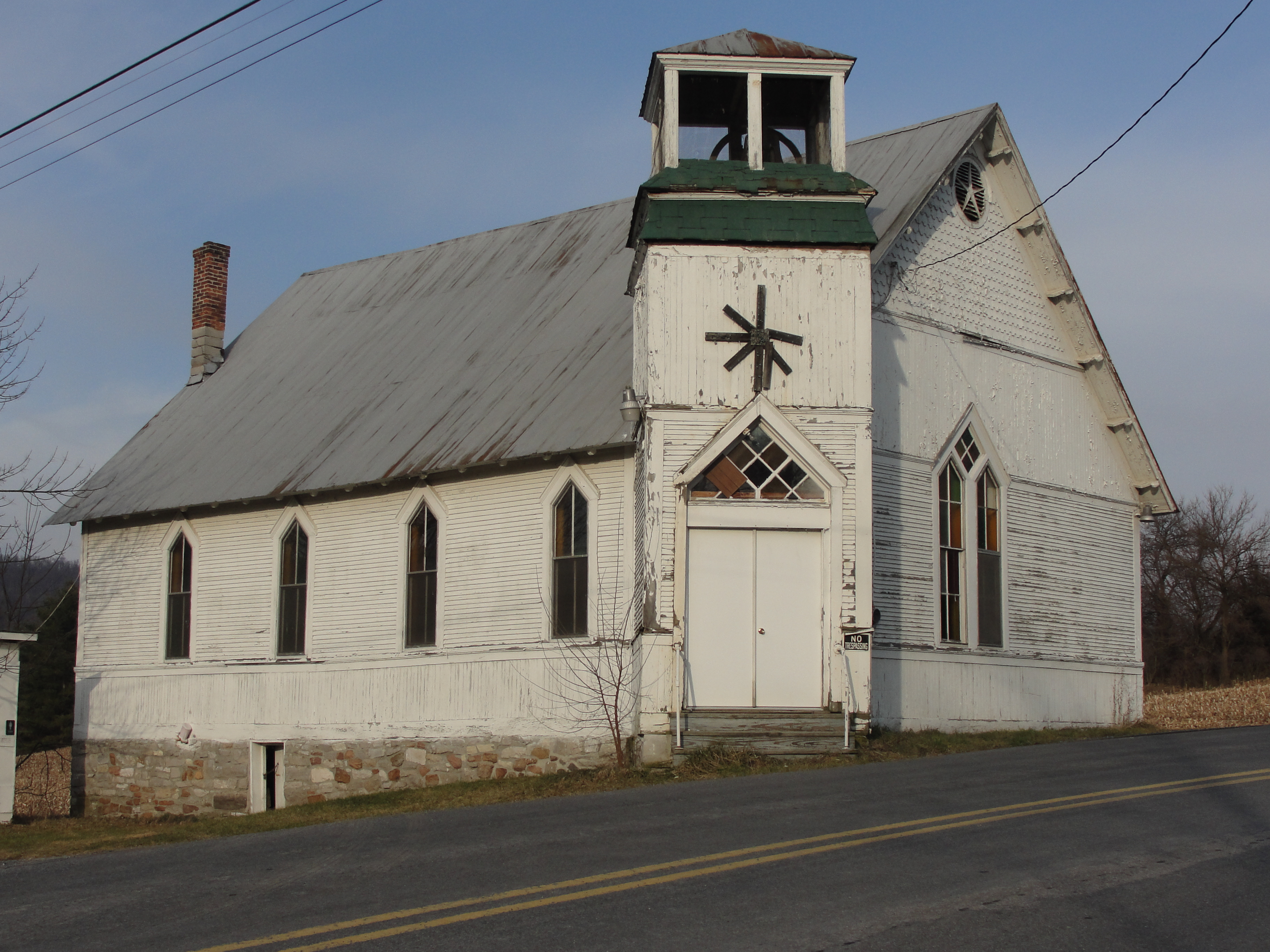
- Dubsite Evangelical Church built in 1897

- Location within Pennsylvania Location within the United States
- Location: Linden Hall Road, Linden Hall, College Township, Pennsylvania
- Coordinates: 40°47′51″N 77°45′41″W
- Area: 34.5 acres (14.0 ha)
- Built: c. 1810
- Built by: John Irvin Sr.
- Architectural style: Vernacular, Gothic Revival, Federal
- NRHP reference No.: 90001409
- Added to NRHP: September 5, 1990

The Linden Hall Historic District is located in Linden Hall, Harris Township, Centre County, Pennsylvania, U.S. The district was added to the National Register of Historic Places in 1990. The district incorporates the historic village of Linden Hall, which dates from the late 1700s. The resources within the district, which total 33 structures, range in date from 1810 to 1919. The district represents an excellent collection of diverse 19th and early 20th century vernacular dwelling styles representative of small rural villages in central Pennsylvania. Linden Hall is one of the oldest continually inhabited communities in western Penns Valley and closely resembles in its scale and mix of resources, other local villages which evolved around mills established in the early 19th century.

The town originally developed as a mill site along Cedar Run around 1800. The village expanded northward from the mill site throughout the 19th century. Though never very large, Linden Hall reached its greatest extent around the turn of the century. A train station was added to the village when the railroad was extended through the valley in 1885.

Today, the early commercial enterprises are gone, robbing Linden Hall of a central focus and leaving gaps among the homes that remain. Major buildings include the Rock Hill School, the Evangelical Methodist Church and the Irvin residence. Homes are principally Victorian in style and are of frame construction. Although some are only one story in height, most range from two to two-and-a-half stories.

== History of the village ==
The first people known to have settled in Linden Hall was the James Watson family who built a cabin along Cedar Creek sometime prior to 1778. The family left the area as a result of numerous Indian raids which forced many families from the area in the "Great Runaway" between 1778 and 1788. On their return, they brought with them an Irish immigrant, John Irvin, who later married their Daughter Anne. Irvin prospered and in 1808, built a grist mill at the narrowest spot on Cedar Creek. The mill and farm which Irvin established upstream of the mill site became the nucleus for what was to become the village of Linden Hall. Because of periodic fires, this location was to be occupied by a succession of two more mills until operations ceased in 1928. The mill was removed in 1938.

The village may have begun with the Irvin mill and farm, but the village grew in part from the establishment of three other farms and their associated buildings. These were established by John Tressler (1836), Daniel Hess (1857) and John Ross (1870). As these other farms were established during the nineteenth century, Linden Hall became a local service center and soon other homes were built and businesses started in the village. These early commercial enterprises included a cobbler shop operated by George Huss and three stores, two of which still exist in the district but are no longer in operation.

Daniel Hess, who established his farm in the area in 1857 and also operated a local store, was instrumental in having the Pennsylvania Rail Road come through Linden Hall. This event initiated a period of economic prosperity which lasted until about the mid-1920s. With rail transportation, it became feasible to commercially exploit stands of white pine and hemlock in the nearby mountains and in 1895, the Linden Hall Lumber Company was formed to log Bear Meadows and the area along Laurel Run in what is currently Rothrock State Forest. With the influx of workers for the nearby lumber mill and the establishment of a coal and lumber business at Linden Hall, a local boom ensued which was reflected by a marked increase in building activity. During the period from 1885-1900, six new homes, a new school, a church, and two new barns were built. The decline in the lumber industry and the rise of the automobile for transportation resulted in less traffic through Linden Hall, and construction declined after 1900. By 1920, passenger service was no longer offered through the village; however, freight rail continued until Hurricane Agnes destroyed portions of the Railroad Right of Way in 1972.
