= Millheim, Pennsylvania =

Borough in Pennsylvania, US

- Borough
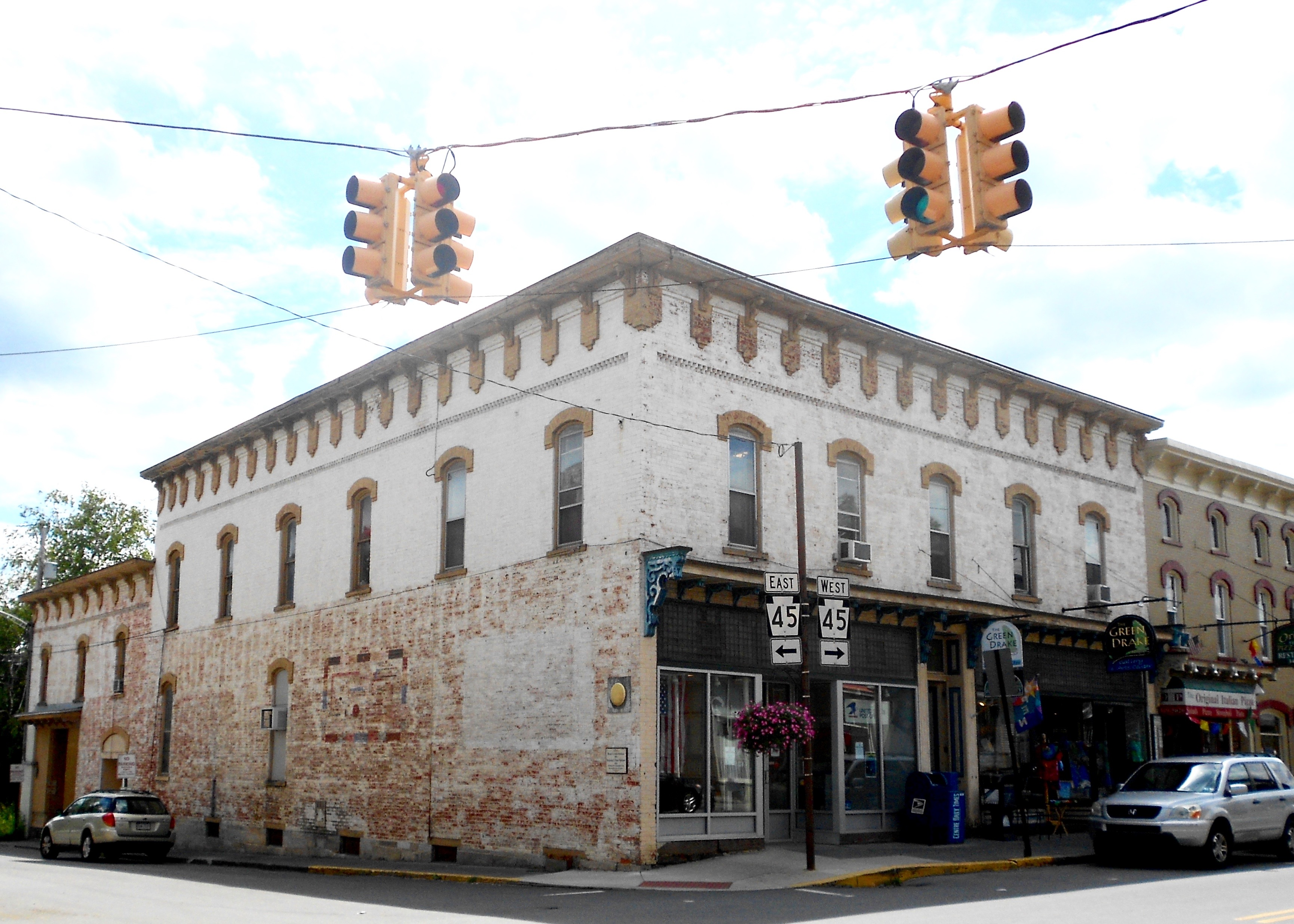
- Post office

- Location of Millheim in Centre County, Pennsylvania.

- Map showing Centre County in Pennsylvania

- Location within Pennsylvania Location within the United States
- Coordinates: 40°53′28″N 77°28′33″W
- Country: United States
- State: Pennsylvania
- County: Centre
- Settled: 1797
- Incorporated (borough): 1879

Government
  - Mayor: Lauralee Snyder

Area
  - Total: 1.33 sq mi (3.45 km^{2})
  - Land: 1.33 sq mi (3.45 km^{2})
  - Water: 0 sq mi (0.00 km^{2})
- Elevation: 696 ft (212 m)

Population (2020)
  - Total: 831
  - Density: 620/sq mi (241/km^{2})
- Time zone: Eastern (EST)
  - Summer (DST): EDT
- Zip code: 16854
- Area code: 814
- FIPS code: 42-49768
- Website: www.millheimborough.net

Millheim is a borough in Centre County, Pennsylvania, United States. It is part of the State College, Pennsylvania Metropolitan Statistical Area. As of the 2020 census, Millheim had a population of 831. The Millheim Historic District, which includes 176 contributing buildings, was listed on the National Register of Historic Places in 1986.

== Geography ==
Millheim is located at 40°53′28″N 77°28′33″W (40.890981, -77.475954).

According to the United States Census Bureau, the borough has a total area of 1.3 square miles (3.4 km^{2}), all land.

The town was named for having a millhouse situated along Elk Creek; the town still features the mill's raceway, which flows through the downtown area.

=== Climate ===
Climate data for Millheim, Pennsylvania (1991–2020)
Month	Jan	Feb	Mar	Apr	May	Jun	Jul	Aug	Sep	Oct	Nov	Dec	Year
Mean daily maximum °F (°C)	32.3 (0.2)	36.6 (2.6)	45.7 (7.6)	59.7 (15.4)	70.9 (21.6)	79.4 (26.3)	84.0 (28.9)	81.7 (27.6)	73.9 (23.3)	61.5 (16.4)	48.3 (9.1)	37.7 (3.2)	59.3 (15.2)
Daily mean °F (°C)	23.5 (−4.7)	27.0 (−2.8)	35.2 (1.8)	47.2 (8.4)	58.0 (14.4)	67.0 (19.4)	71.2 (21.8)	69.0 (20.6)	61.4 (16.3)	49.7 (9.8)	38.5 (3.6)	29.8 (−1.2)	48.1 (9.0)
Mean daily minimum °F (°C)	14.6 (−9.7)	17.4 (−8.1)	24.6 (−4.1)	34.7 (1.5)	45.0 (7.2)	54.6 (12.6)	58.3 (14.6)	56.3 (13.5)	48.9 (9.4)	37.9 (3.3)	28.8 (−1.8)	21.8 (−5.7)	36.9 (2.7)
Average precipitation inches (mm)	2.96 (75)	2.32 (59)	3.33 (85)	3.63 (92)	3.89 (99)	4.03 (102)	3.92 (100)	4.03 (102)	4.40 (112)	3.65 (93)	3.08 (78)	3.20 (81)	42.44 (1,078)
Average snowfall inches (cm)	9.2 (23)	8.3 (21)	8.2 (21)	1.0 (2.5)	0.0 (0.0)	0.0 (0.0)	0.0 (0.0)	0.0 (0.0)	0.0 (0.0)	0.3 (0.76)	2.2 (5.6)	6.1 (15)	35.3 (88.86)
Source: NOAA

== Demographics ==
Historical population
Census	Pop.	Note	%±
1880	577		—
1890	700		21.3%
1900	612		−12.6%
1910	626		2.3%
1920	515		−17.7%
1930	659		28.0%
1940	682		3.5%
1950	750		10.0%
1960	780		4.0%
1970	871		11.7%
1980	800		−8.2%
1990	847		5.9%
2000	749		−11.6%
2010	904		20.7%
2020	831		−8.1%

As of the census of 2010, there were 904 people, 377 households, and 251 families residing in the borough. The population density was 684.8 inhabitants per square mile (264.4/km^{2}). There were 417 housing units at an average density of 315.9 per square mile (122.0/km^{2}). The racial makeup of the borough was 98.2% White, 0.1% Black or African American, 0.1% Native American, 0.1% other, and 1.5% from two or more races.

There were 377 households, out of which 31.6% had children under the age of 18 living with them, 47.7% were married couples living together, 5.6% had a male householder with no wife present, 13.3% had a female householder with no husband present, and 33.4% were non-families. 28.4% of all households were made up of individuals, and 14.0% had someone living alone who was 65 years of age or older. The average household size was 2.40 and the average family size was 2.94.

In the borough the population was spread out, with 25.1% under the age of 18, 6.7% from 18 to 24, 24.6% from 25 to 44, 25.8% from 45 to 64, and 17.8% who were 65 years of age or older. The median age was 40 years. For every 100 females there were 92.8 males. For every 100 females age 18 and over, there were 82.0 males.

The median income for a household in the borough was $43,077, and the median income for a family was $48,029. The per capita income for the borough was $17,335. About 9.9% of families and 10.7% of the population were below the poverty line, including 18.4% of those under age 18 and 3.8% of those age 65 or over.

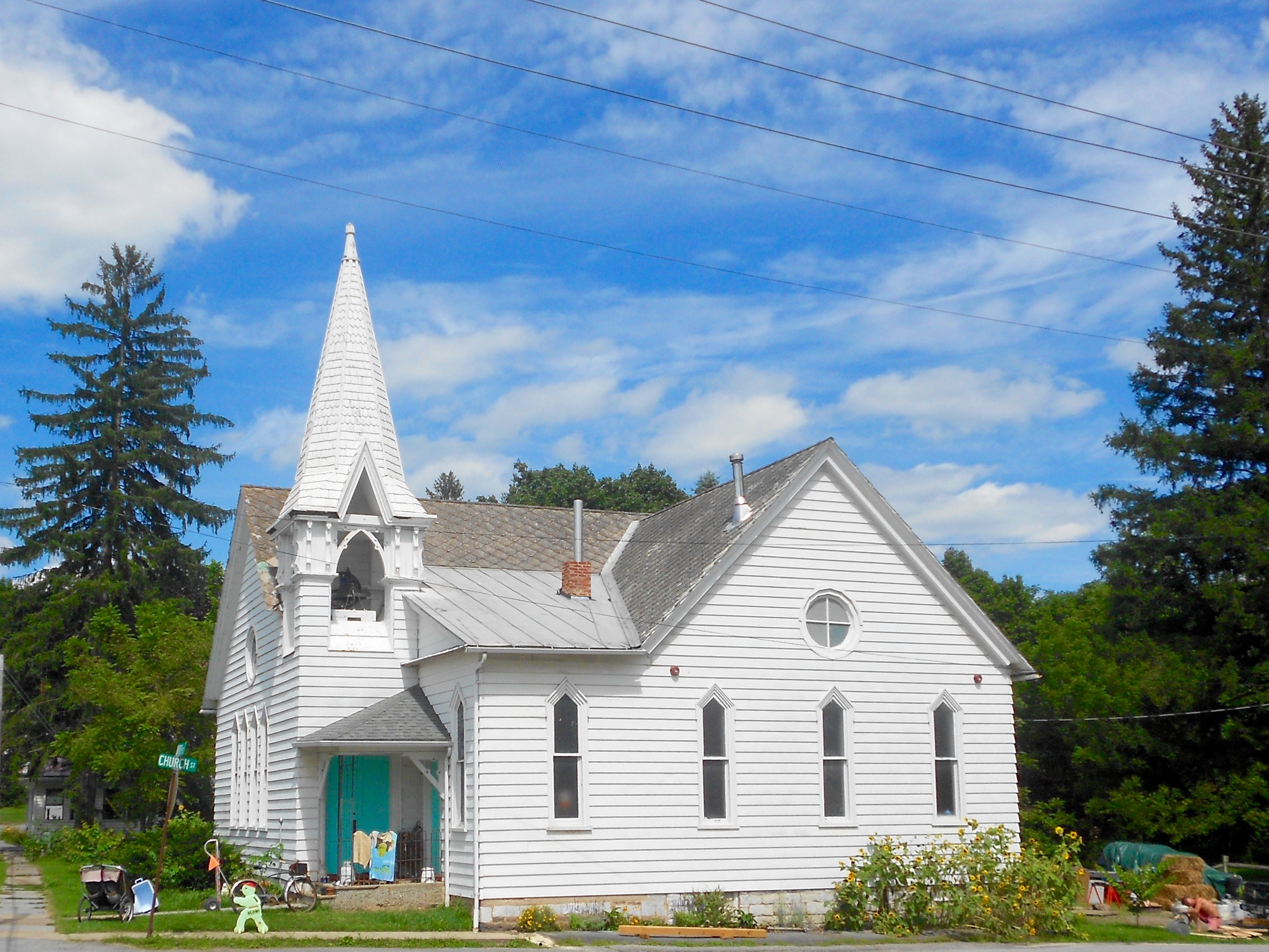
Former Reformed church

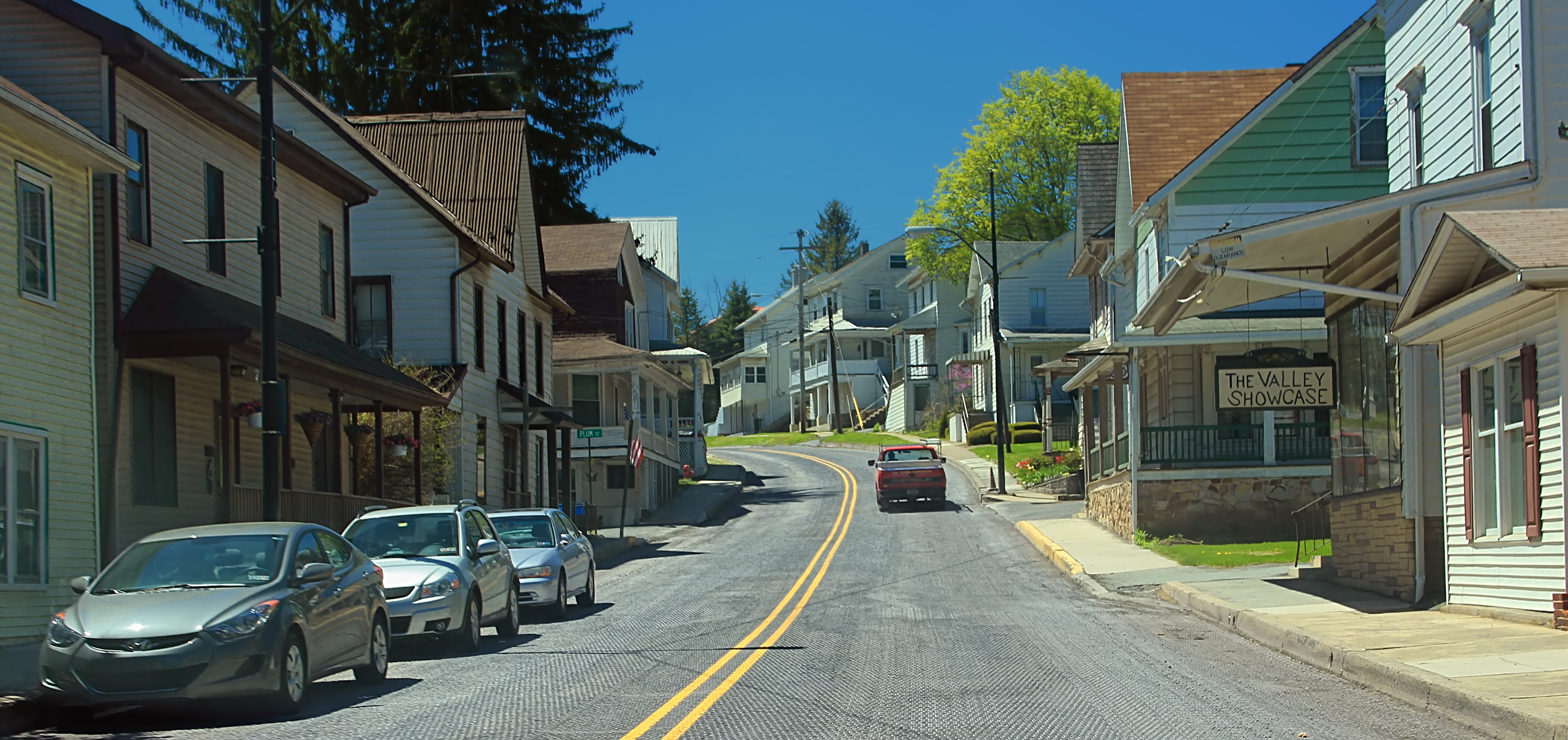
Main Street
