= Felix Dale Stone House =

Historic house in Pennsylvania, United States

- U.S. National Register of Historic Places
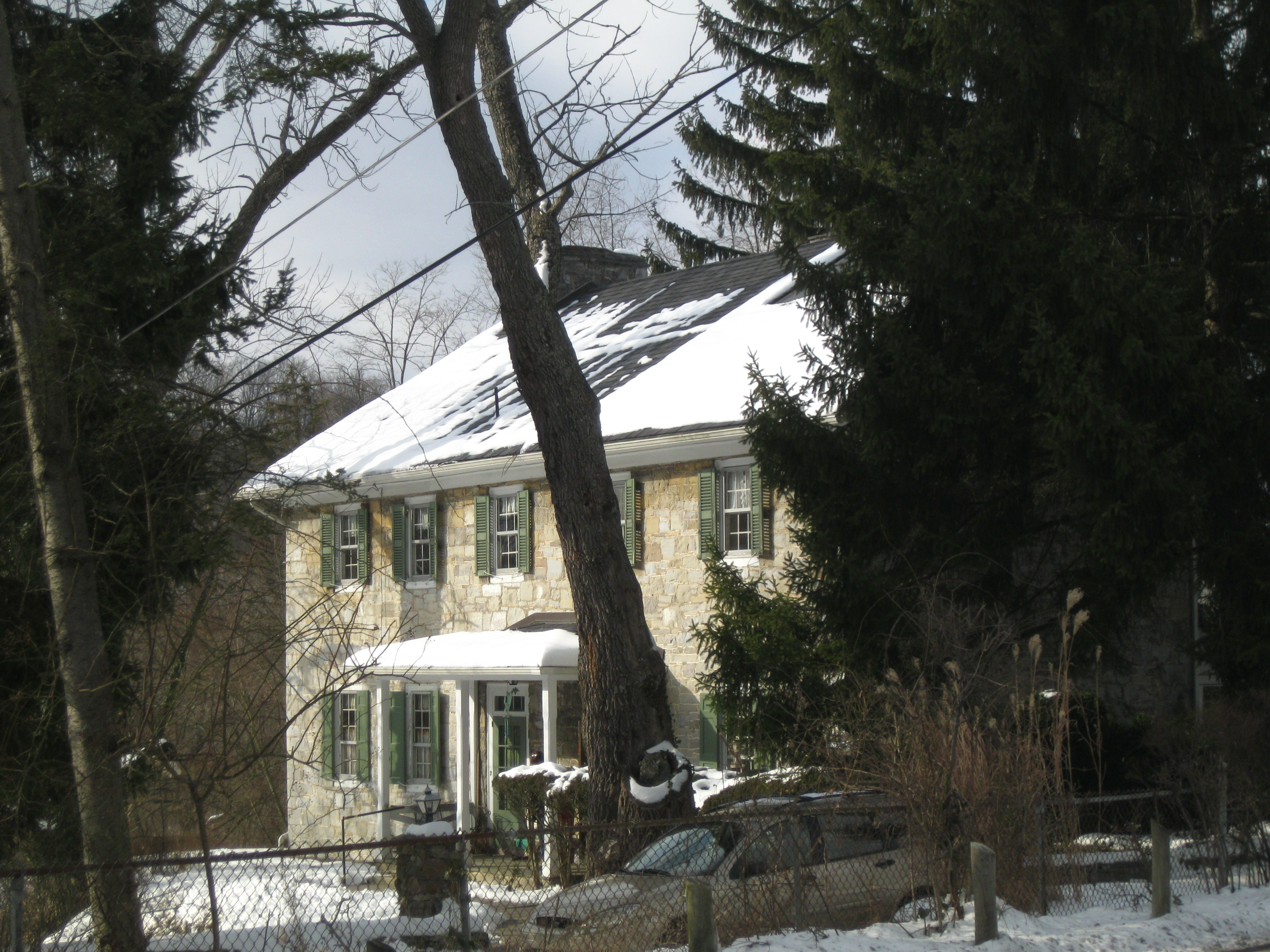
- The house in 2013

- Location within Pennsylvania Location within the United States
- Location: Pennsylvania Route 871, south of Lemont, College Township, Pennsylvania
- Coordinates: 40°48′11″N 77°48′49″W
- Area: 0.3 acres (0.12 ha)
- Built: 1823
- Architectural style: Georgian
- NRHP reference No.: 82003777
- Added to NRHP: April 20, 1982

Felix Dale Stone House, also known as the L.R. Parks House, is a historic home located at College Township, Centre County, Pennsylvania. It was built in 1823, and is a two-story, five-bay, Georgian styled stone farmhouse with a gable roof. It features two front entrances with a hipped roof porch. The interior has a center hall plan and features finely crafted woodwork.

It was added to the National Register of Historic Places in 1982.
