= Millheim Historic District =

Historic district in Pennsylvania, United States

- U.S. National Register of Historic Places
- U.S. Historic district
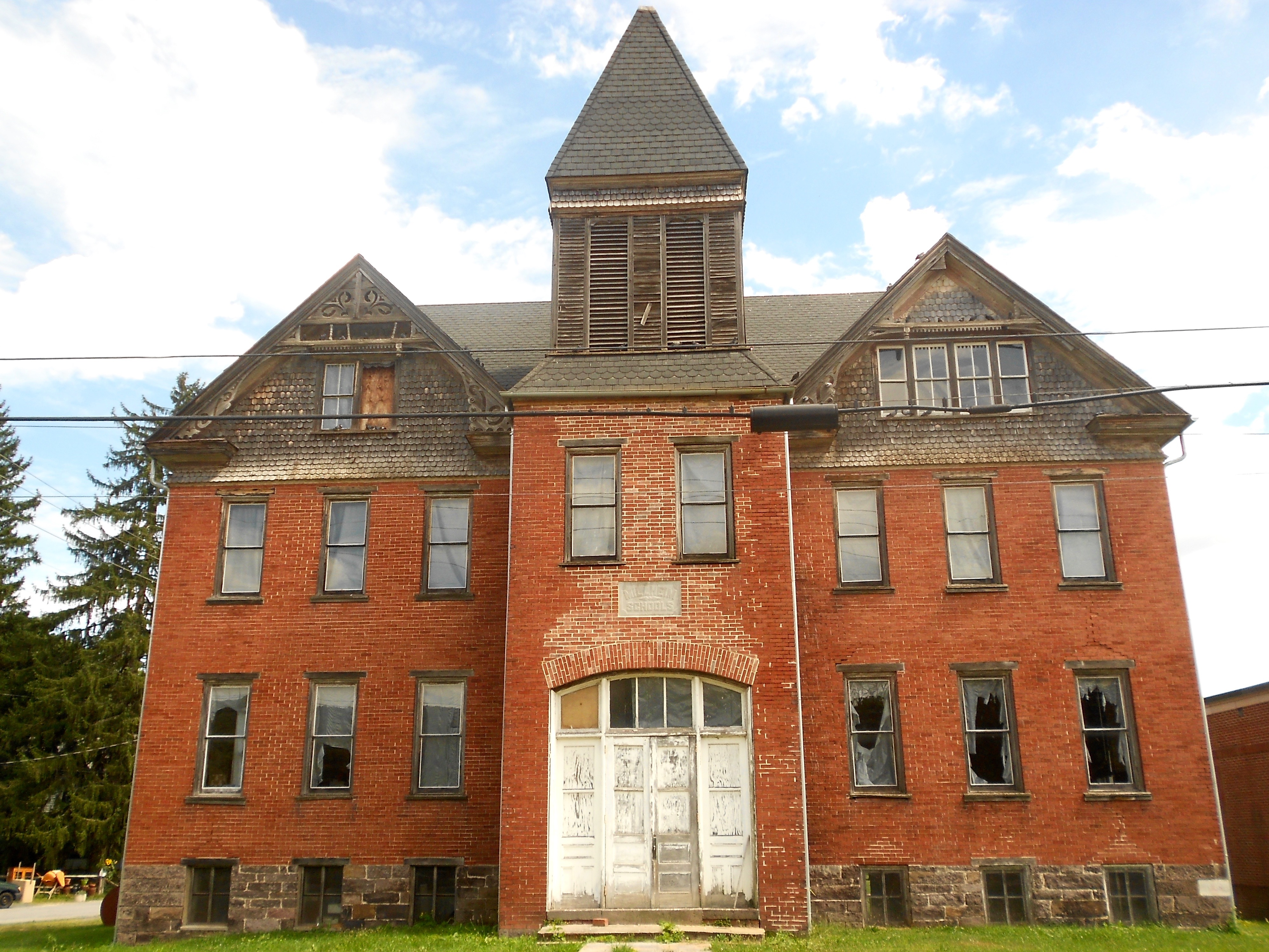
- Old school

- Location within Pennsylvania Location within the United States
- Location: PA 45 and PA 445, Millheim, Pennsylvania
- Coordinates: 40°53′34″N 77°28′38″W
- Area: 127 acres (51 ha)
- Architectural style: Colonial Revival, Bungalow/craftsman, Late Victorian
- NRHP reference No.: 86000787
- Added to NRHP: March 25, 1986

The Millheim Historic District is a national historic district that is located in Millheim, Centre County, Pennsylvania.

It was added to the National Register of Historic Places in 1986.

== History and architectural features ==
The district includes 176 contributing buildings that are located in the central business district and surrounding residential areas of Millheim. Among the residential building types present are the simple "I"-type, Georgian "I"-type, Victorianized "I"-type, connected or double type, gable-end oriented type, bungalow, and eclectic cube type. Notable non-residential buildings include the Millheim School, a mill (1817), and a silk mill (c. 1900).

== Gallery ==
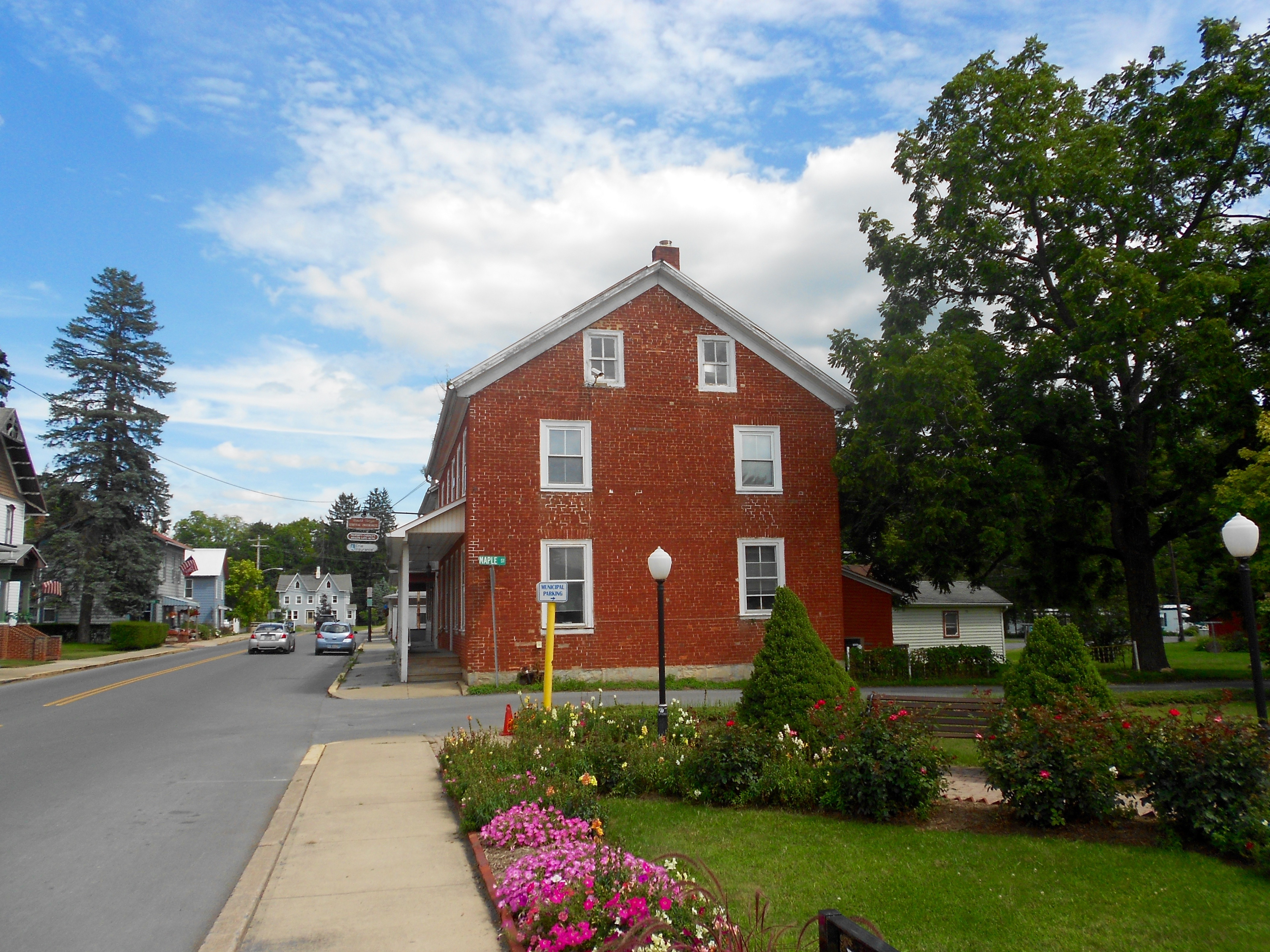
House on Main Street

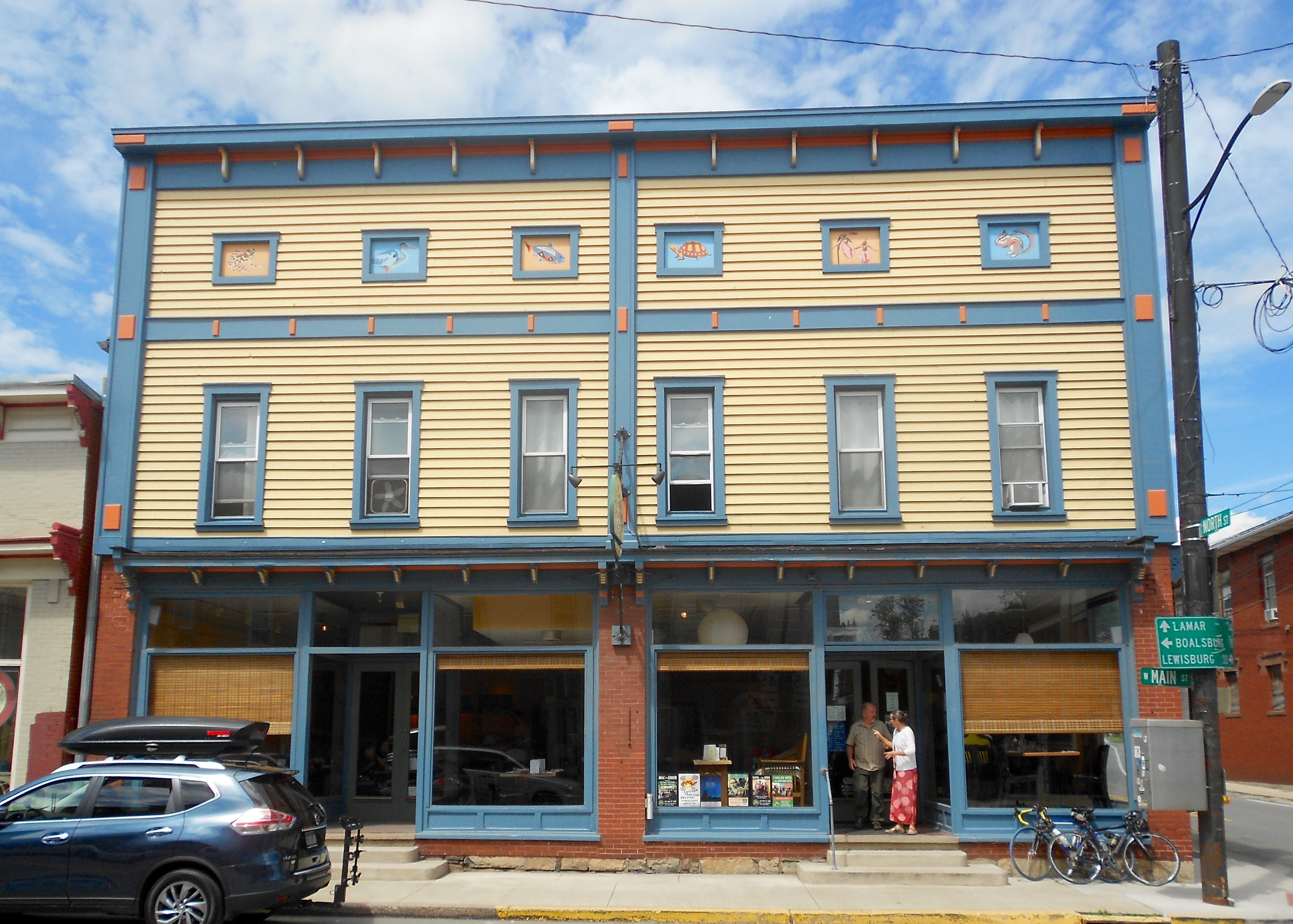
Bar on Main Street

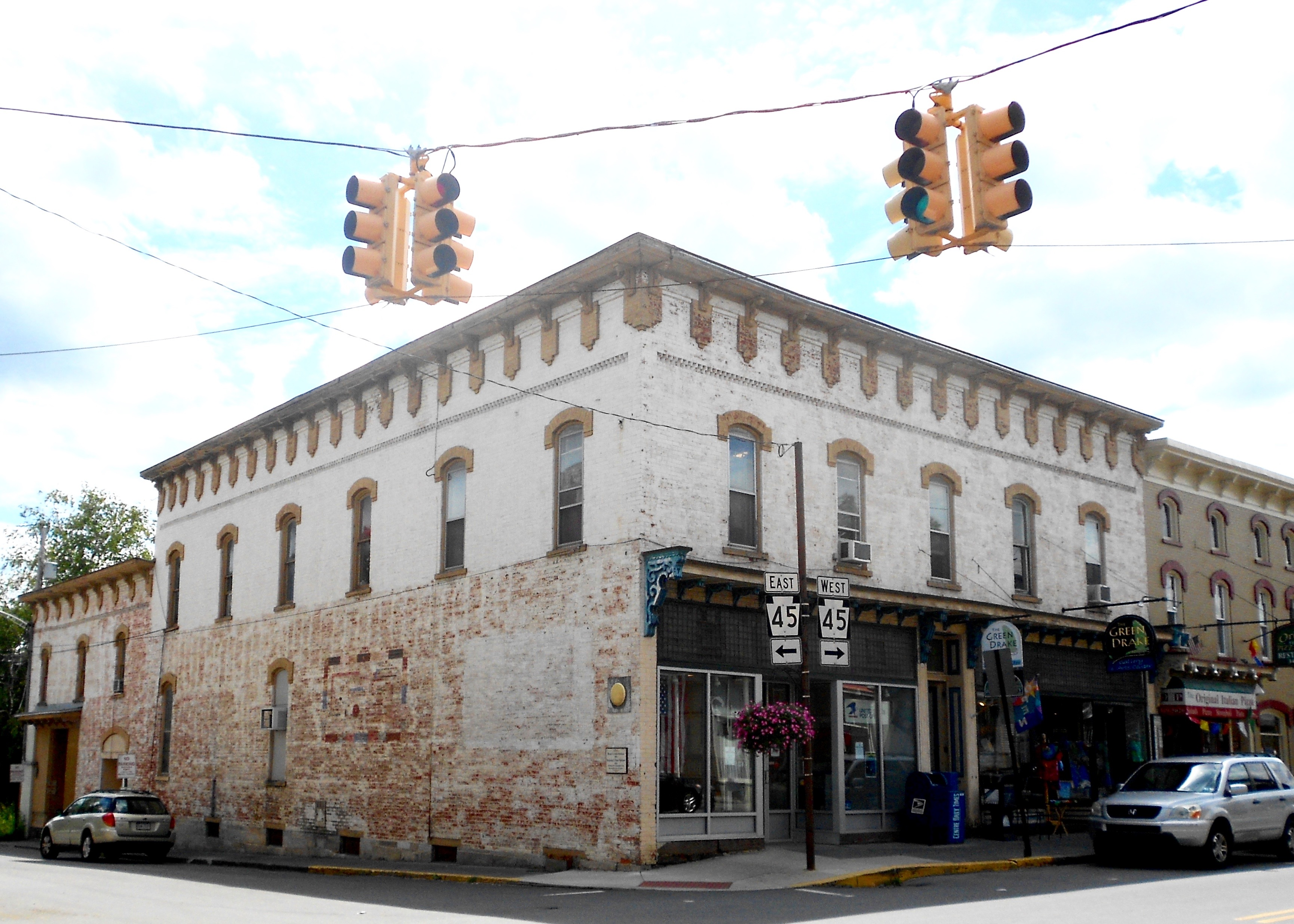
Post office

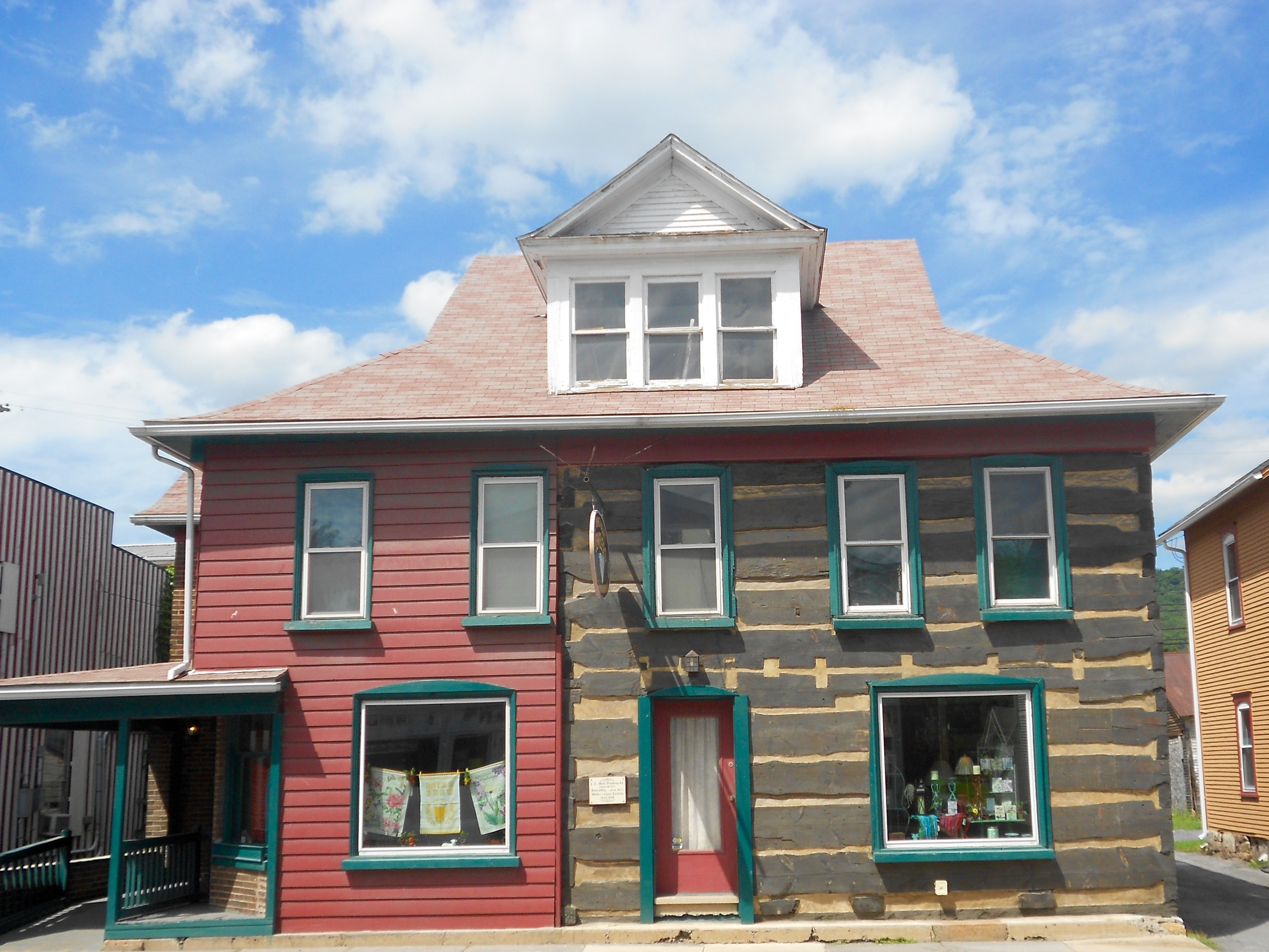
Plank house

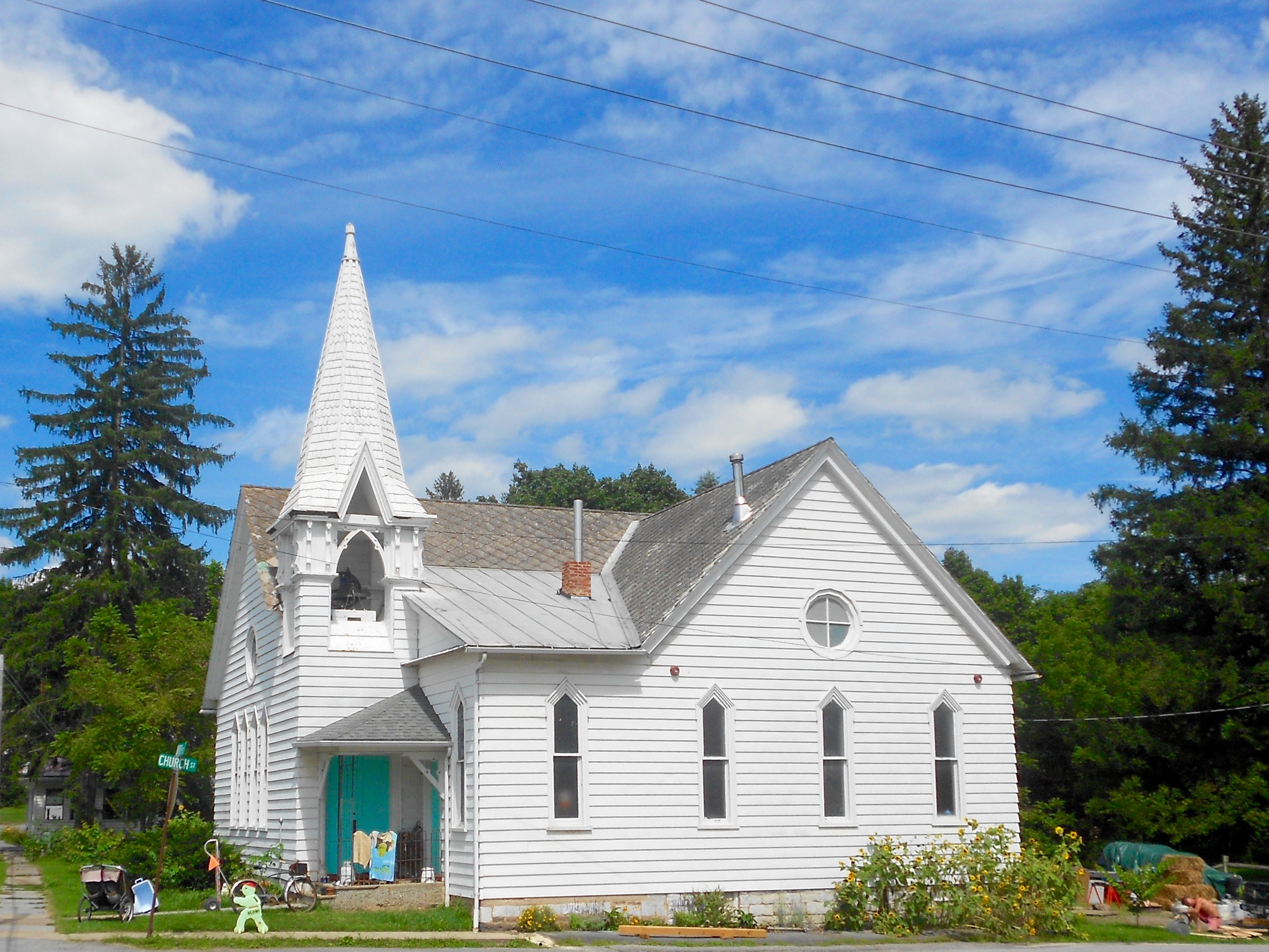
Former Reformed church
