= Penn's Cave and Hotel =

- Penn's Cave House
- U.S. National Register of Historic Places
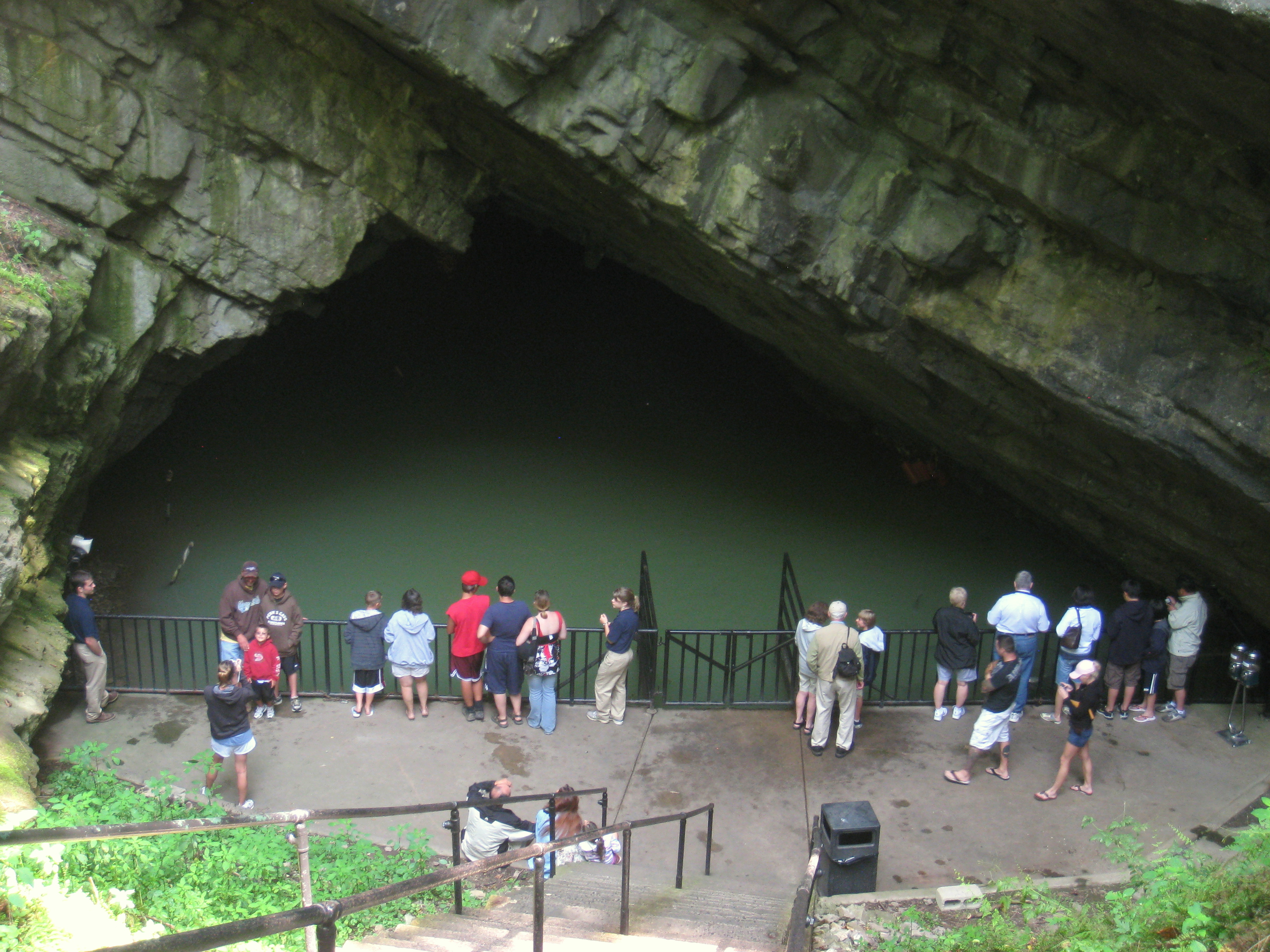
- Penn's Cave, August 2009

- Location within Pennsylvania Location within the United States
- Location: 5 miles (8.0 km) east of Centre Hall off Pennsylvania Route 192, Gregg Township, Pennsylvania
- Coordinates: 40°52′58″N 77°36′36″W
- Area: 57 acres (23 ha)
- Built: 1885
- Architect: Luge, D.F.
- NRHP reference No.: 78002363
- Added to NRHP: April 14, 1978

Penn's Cave Airport
- IATA: none; ICAO: none; FAA LID: N74

Summary
- Location: 4 miles NE of Centre Hall, Pennsylvania
- Elevation AMSL: 1,245 ft (379 m)
- Interactive map of Penn's Cave Airport

Runways
| Direction | Length | | Surface |
| Direction | ft | m | Surface |
|---|---|---|---|
| 7/25 | 2,509 | 765 | Asphalt |
- Source: FAA

Penn's Cave House is a historic, American structure. Used as a hotel from 1885 into the early 1900s, it is part of the Penn's Cave & Wildlife Park that is located in Gregg Township, Centre County, Pennsylvania. Now used strictly for the offices of Penn's Cave, Inc., it has not offered overnight or hotel accommodations since 1919.

This property was added to the National Register of Historic Places in 1978.

== History ==
The Penn's Cave property includes seven contributing buildings, one contributing site (the cave), and two contributing structures. Penn's Cave House was built in 1885, and is a three-story, seven-bay, frame building with a high mansard roof. It sits on a limestone foundation. It was extensively remodeled in 1938, and again in 1960. A one-story, rear wing was added in 1962, and was a coffee shop for cave visitors until 1980, when the Penn's Cave Visitors Center was built and opened. In 1980, it became a private residence. Its upper floors are used for corporate offices, private meetings and special events.

The cave is a popular tourist attraction and features a natural curiosity with its Trenton (or Beekmantown) limestone formations. The cave measures approximately 1,300 feet in length. The height of the cave roof reaches up to fifty-five feet above the surface of the stream, which is three to five feet deep throughout the cave. The stream's water level is maintained by a man-made dam, resulting in the present-day water depth and navigability of the passage. The temperature within the cave remains a constant fifty-two degrees Fahrenheit year round. Penn's Cave Airport is located adjacent to the park.

This property was added to the National Register of Historic Places in 1978.

== Controversies ==
Eighteen of the twenty-one white tailed deer that were born at Penn's Cave in 2020 died. In 2021, Penn's Cave was fined by the USDA for the deaths of thirty-four white tailed deer, eleven of which were shot. Although several of the deer were killed for "looking sick," there was no prior notification of, or consultation with, a veterinarian as legally required.

== Gallery ==
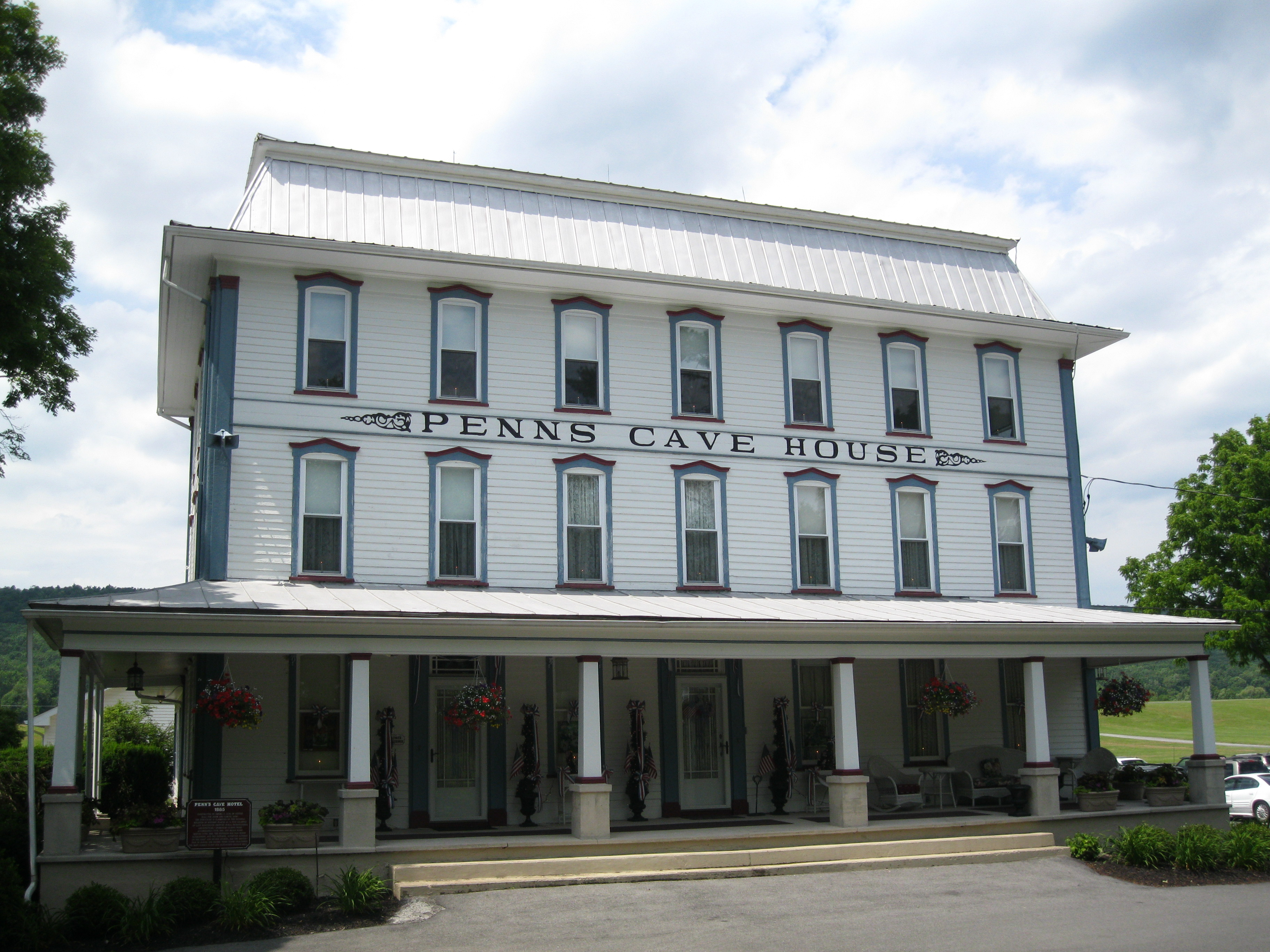
The former hotel at the cave

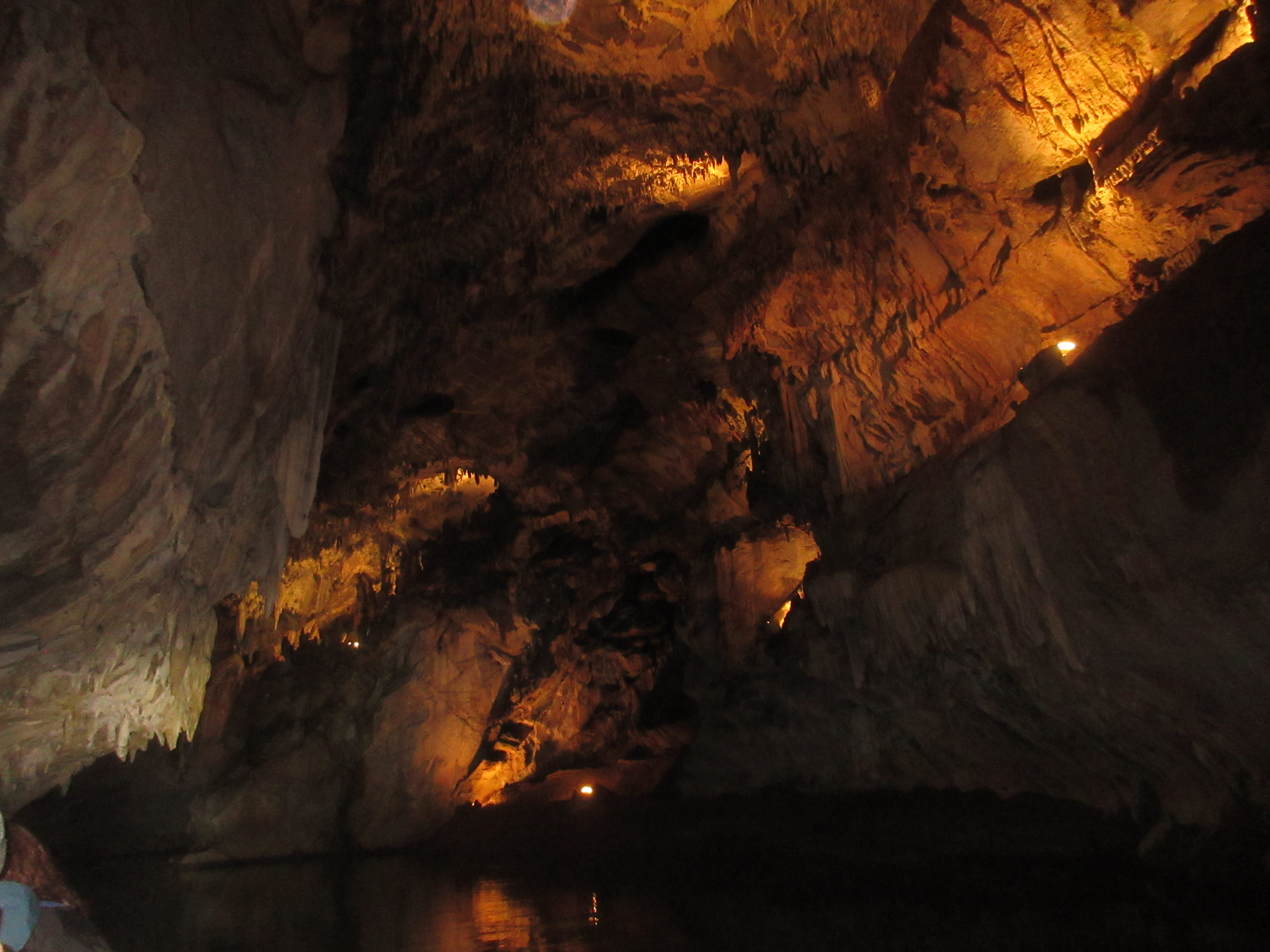
Cave interior

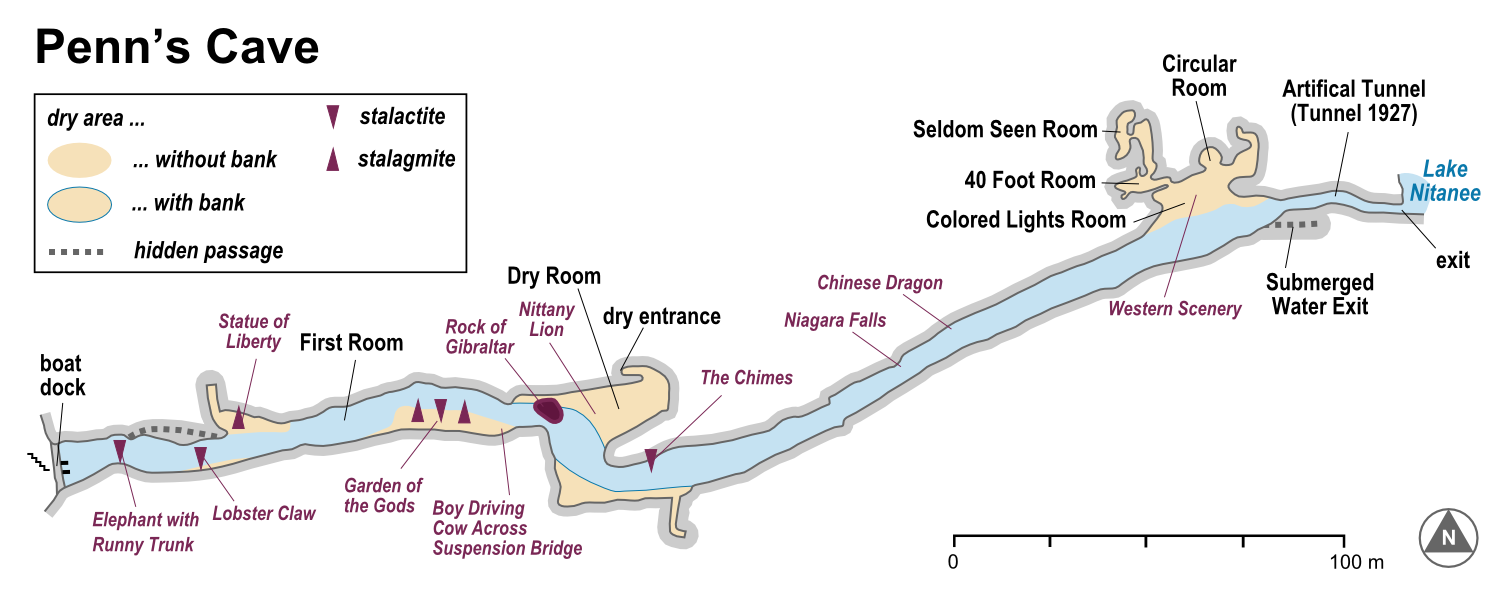
Map of Penn's Cave, October 2010
