= Gen. John Thompson House =

Historic house in Pennsylvania, United States

- U.S. National Register of Historic Places
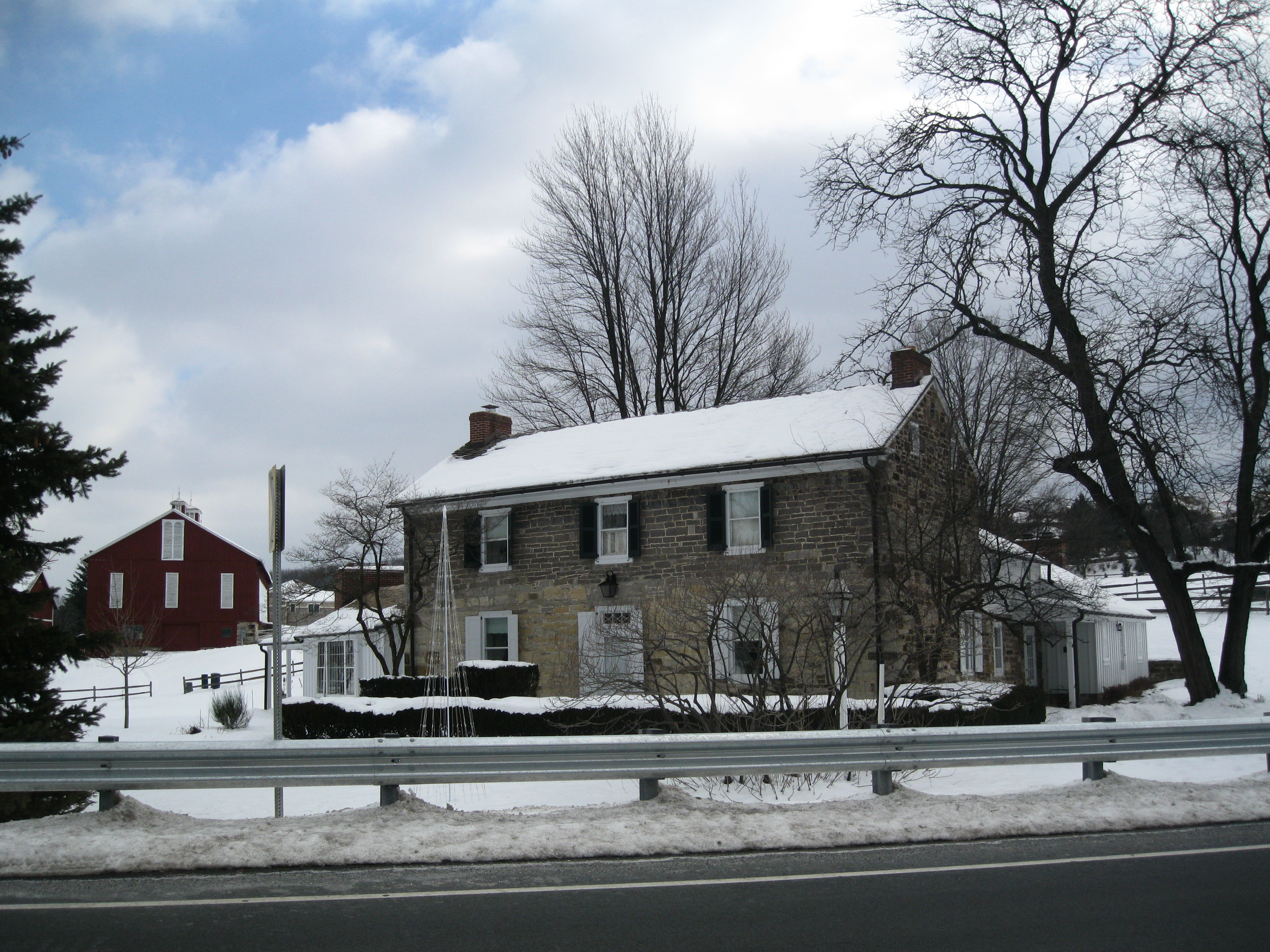
- The house in 2013

- Location within Pennsylvania Location within the United States
- Location: E. Branch Rd., east of State College, College Township, Pennsylvania, U.S.
- Coordinates: 40°47′25″N 77°49′56″W
- Area: 3 acres (1.2 ha)
- Built: 1813–1814
- Architectural style: Georgian vernacular
- NRHP reference No.: 78002366
- Added to NRHP: March 29, 1978

Gen. John Thompson House is a historic home located at College Township, Centre County, Pennsylvania. It was built in 1813–1814, and is a two-story, three-bay, Georgian style limestone and sandstone farmhouse with stone kitchen ell. The interior has a traditional center hall plan. A large one-story board-and-batten sided family room addition was built in 1958–1959. Also on the property is a large barn dated to the American Civil War period.

It was added to the National Register of Historic Places in 1978.
