= Black Moshannon State Park Historic Districts =

Historic district in Pennsylvania, United States

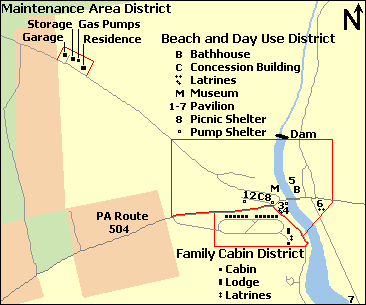
Map of Black Moshannon State Park with the outlines of the three Historic Districts shown in red and buildings in black

The Black Moshannon State Park Historic Districts are three separate historic districts on the National Register of Historic Places (NRHP) at Black Moshannon State Park in Rush Township, Centre County, Pennsylvania in the United States. The structures in the historic districts were constructed in the 1930s during the Great Depression by the Civilian Conservation Corps (CCC). The three districts are: the Beach and Day Use District, with 18 contributing structures, including 11 different picnic pavilions, concession building, bathhouse, museum, and four open pit latrines; the Family Cabin District with 16 contributing properties, including 13 cabins, one lodge and two latrines; and the Maintenance District with four contributing properties, including a storage building, three-bay garage, gas pump house, and ranger's residence.

Beaver Meadow CCC Camp S-71, near Philipsburg was home to CCC Company 359, which built the structures in the three historic districts between 1933 and 1937. Black Moshannon State Park opened in 1937, and over the years some of the CCC-built structures have been lost or replaced, including the dam that forms Black Moshannon Lake. Still, enough structures remained, and in good enough shape for the three historic districts to be added to the NRHP in 1987.

== Background ==
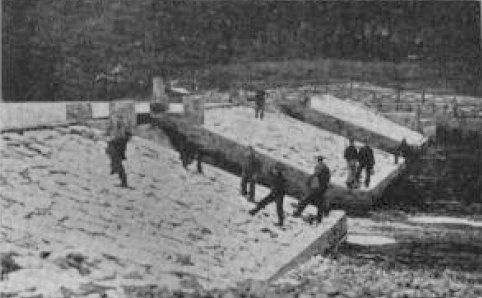
Men of CCC Company 359 working on the dam in Black Moshannon State Park, c. 1936.

The CCC, founded by President Franklin D. Roosevelt, created many jobs for unemployed industrial workers from Altoona, Bellefonte and Tyrone. Black Moshannon State Park is just one of many examples of the work of the Civilian Conservation Corps throughout central Pennsylvania.

Beaver Meadow CCC Camp S-71 was built in May 1933 near the abandoned village of Beaver Mills, and was one of the first CCC camps built to expand recreational facilities in Pennsylvania. Over 200 young men moved in and began the work of conserving soil, water and timber in the Black Moshannon area. They cut roads through the growing forest to aid in fighting the many wildfires that sprang up, and planted many acres of red pines as part of the reforestation effort. The CCC also built many of the park facilities still in use today. They built log cabins, picnic pavilions, a food concession stand, and miles of trails. Early on the CCC constructed a dam at Black Moshannon Lake, on the site of the former mill pond dam.

The CCC camp closed in January 1937 and Black Moshannon State Park opened that same year. In the 1950s the CCC-built dam was replaced by the current structure. In 1987, the existing CCC structures in the park were placed on the National Register of Historic Places as part of three separate historic districts. All three districts were built between 1933 and 1937 and are designated as the day use, family cabin and maintenance districts.

== Beach and Day Use District ==
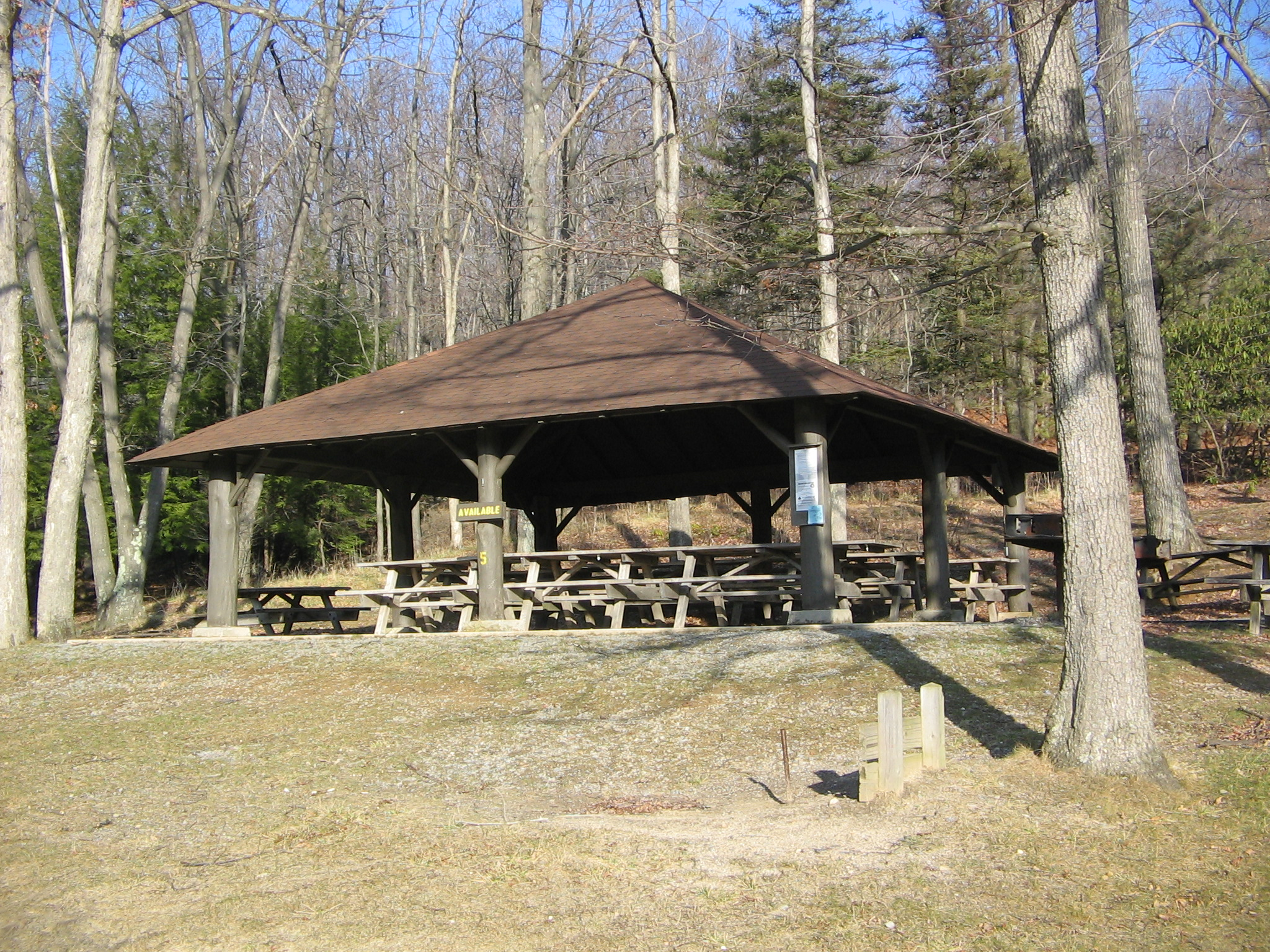
Pavilion 5 is a contributing property in the Beach and Day Use Historic District.

Eighteen structures in the Beach and Day Use Historic District are contributing structures and are protected as historic places. These structures include seven "standard" pavilions with pyramidal roofs and timber supports, a larger picnic shelter with a log railing and supports and a roof similar to those of the "standard" pavilions, and three water pump shelters. The water pump shelters were built of native stone and covered with pebbles, and have since been converted to picnic pavilions. The concession building, bathhouse, and museum are also protected. The concession building is a rectangular log building with saddle corners and a gabled roof with a cross gabled entryway. The bathhouse is at the beach and was built with stone columns and a hip roof. The bathhouse walls consist of vertical wooden siding. The nature museum is a former stone and wood pavilion that is set into a dirt bank with stone walls. Four open pit latrines with wane edge siding and hipped roofs are also contributing structures to the Beach and Day Use Historic District. There are no non-contributing structures in the district.

== Family Cabin District ==
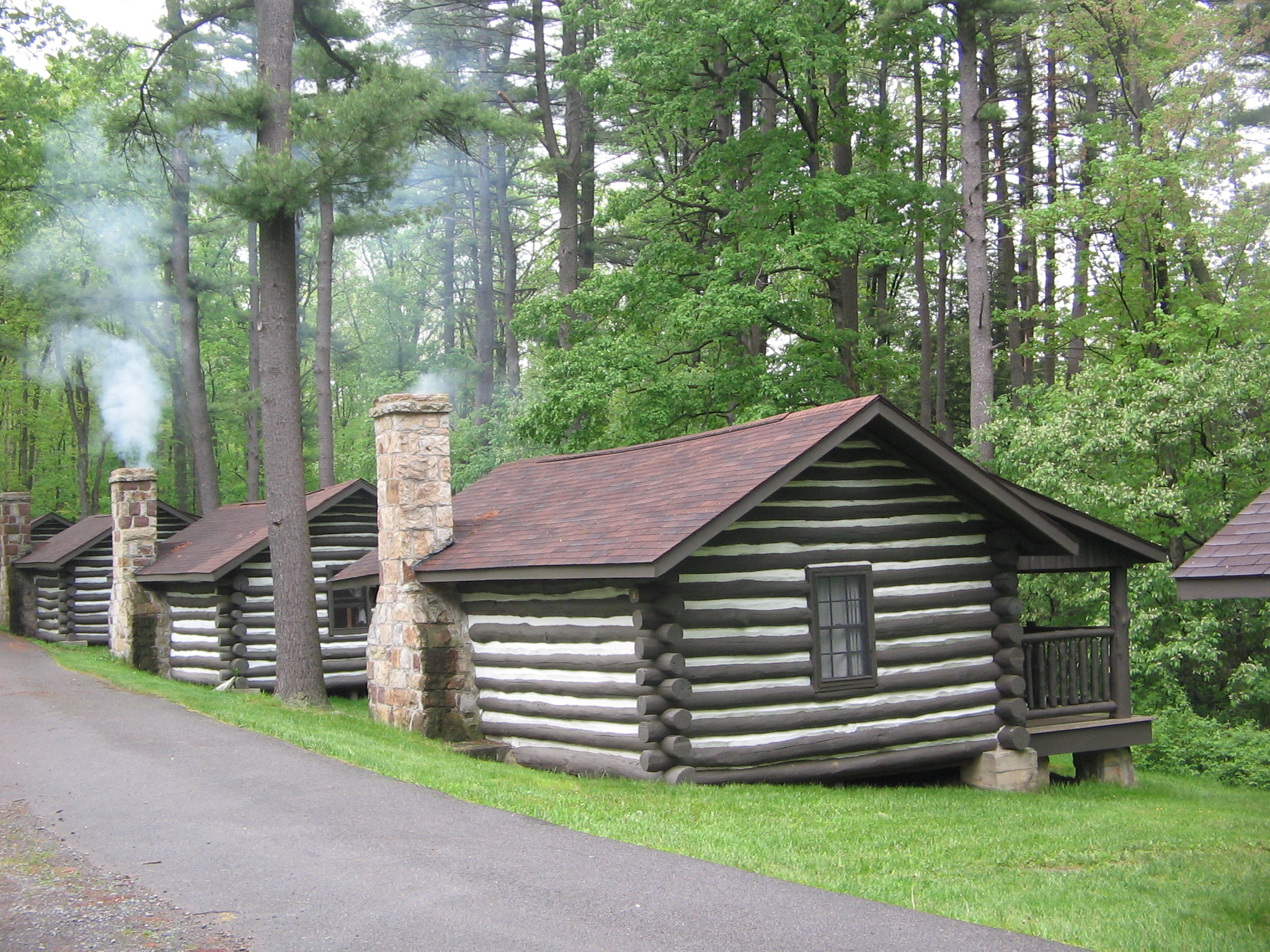
Rustic cabins 9, 10, and 11 have two rooms each and are part of the Family Cabin District.

The Family Cabin Historic District of Black Moshannon State Park consists of 16 contributing properties on 16.5 acres (6.7 ha): 13 cabins, one lodge and two latrines. Twelve of the cabins are laid out in a straight line along an access road, which is a design similar to that of motor courts of the 1930s. The design of the cabin layout at Black Moshannon State Park is unique compared to CCC-built cabins at other Pennsylvania state parks. The cabins at the other parks reflect the "rustic" style of cabin layout promoted by the National Park Service.

Cabins 1 - 6 are single room log cabins with saddle corners and white cement chinking. They have gable entries and an exterior stone fireplace on the end opposite the entry. Cabins 7 - 12 are two-room log cabins with eave entries and stone fireplaces along the rear walls. The Lodge (also known as Cabin 13) is a large rectangular clapboard-sided building with a large centrally located stone fireplace. Cabin 14 is an L-shaped cabin with an open porch; the stone fireplace forms one exterior wall, while the other walls are clapboard. Two pit latrines built by the CCC are protected: both have shed roofs and are clapboard sided.

== Maintenance District ==
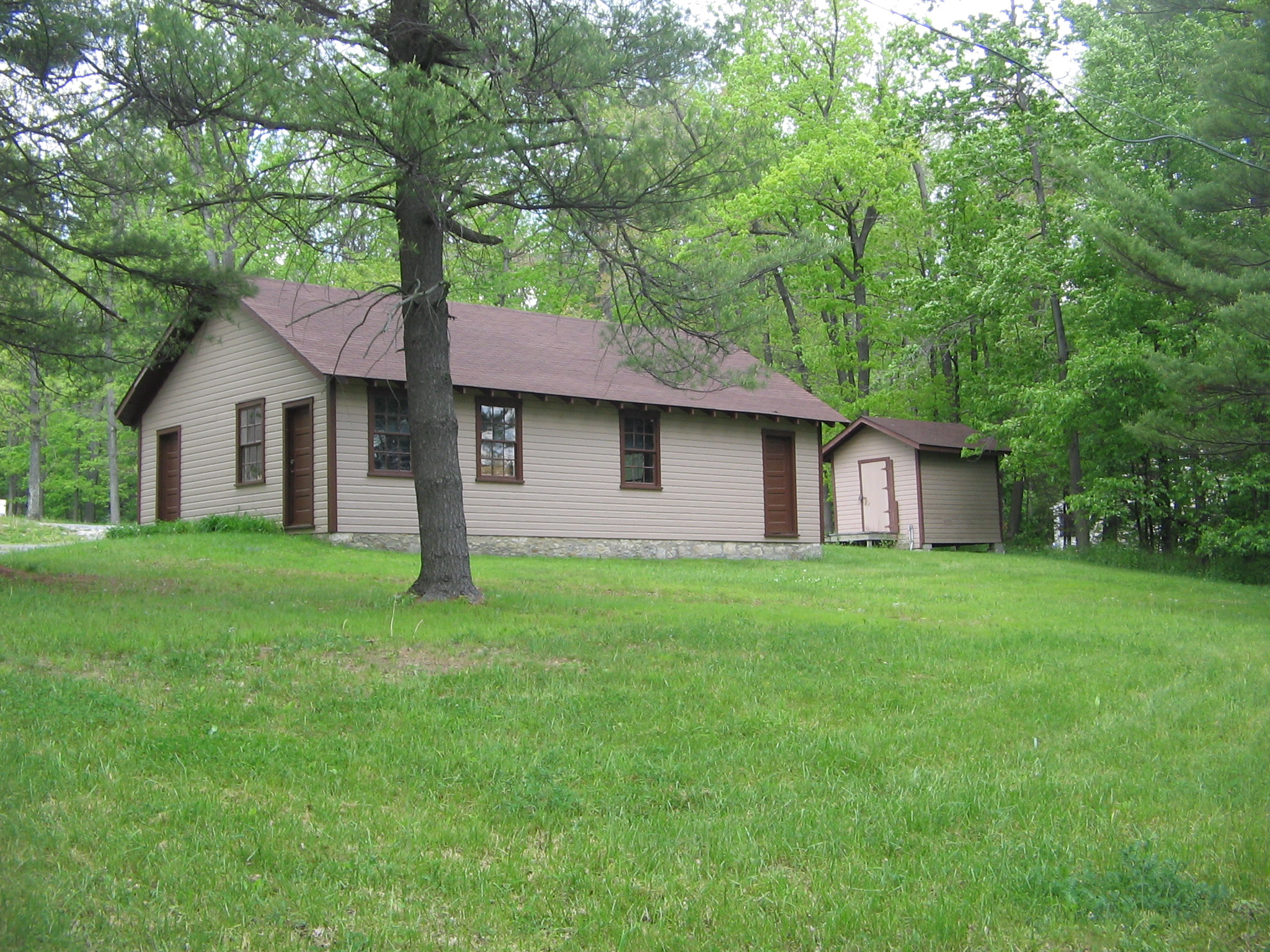
The storage building (left) and pump house (right) in the park

The maintenance Historic District at Black Moshannon State Park comprises four CCC-built structures and covers 2.75 acres (1.11 ha) along Munson Road, in the northwest corner of the park. The storage building is a wood-frame structure with gable roofs and clapboard siding. It is similar to storage buildings built by the military during the 1930s and 1940s. A three-bay garage of standard military design is included in this historic district. It is two stories high and has clapboard siding. The gas pump house has an extended eave to protect the gas pumps, and is also a standard military design. The ranger's residence is a 1 1/2-story gable-roofed house with a small addition on one end. It was-sided with aluminum siding at some point after the CCC built it. There is one non-contributing structure in the district: a Maintenance Shop built in 1978.
