= Camelot (State College, Pennsylvania) =

Historic house in Pennsylvania, United States

- U.S. National Register of Historic Places
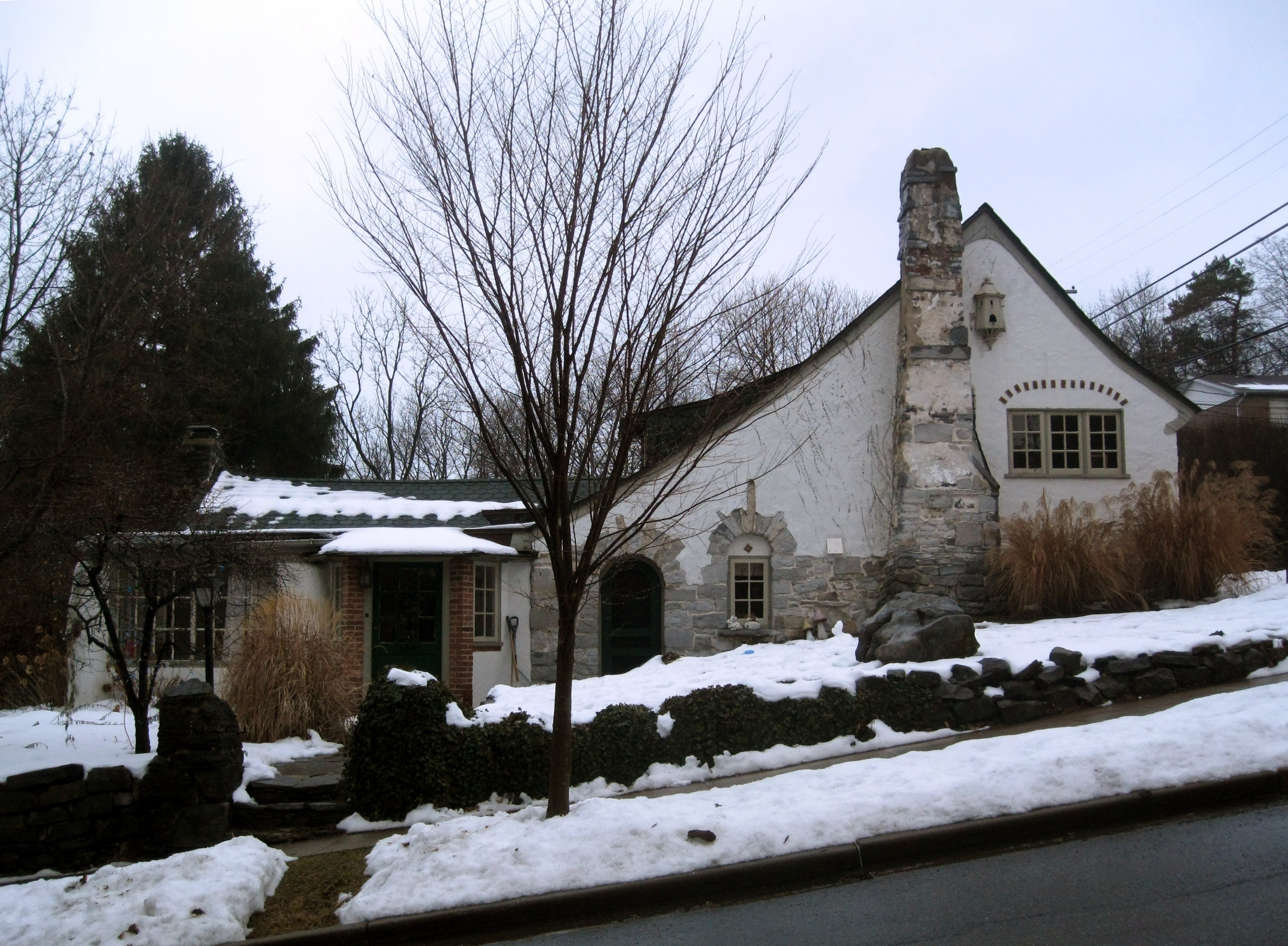
- The house in 2013

- Location within Pennsylvania Location within the United States
- Location: 520 S. Fraser St., State College, Pennsylvania
- Coordinates: 40°47′20″N 77°51′29″W
- Area: 0.3 acres (0.12 ha)
- Built: 1922
- Built by: John Hoy
- Architect: David A. Campbell
- Architectural style: "English Wayside" style
- NRHP reference No.: 79002192
- Added to NRHP: April 26, 1979

Camelot is a historic home located at State College, Centre County, Pennsylvania. It was built starting in 1922, and is a two-story rambling frame dwelling, covered with stucco and dressed in limestone. It features a roof that consists of a series of five main interconnecting gables with gable overhang. The house has a whimsical character and its setting suggests a scene from the English countryside.

It was added to the National Register of Historic Places in 1979.
