= List of Pennsylvania state historical markers in Centre County =

Location of Centre County in Pennsylvania

This is a list of the Pennsylvania state historical markers in Centre County.

This is intended to be a complete list of the official state historical markers placed in Centre County, Pennsylvania by the Pennsylvania Historical and Museum Commission (PHMC). The locations of the historical markers, as well as the latitude and longitude coordinates as provided by the PHMC's database, are included below when available. There are 29 historical markers located in Centre County.

== Historical markers ==
Marker title	Image	Date dedicated	Location	Marker type	Topics
28th Division Shrine		May 6, 1947	Business U.S. 322 at Pa. Military Museum, Boalsburg; 40.78028°N 77.79723°W	Roadside	Government & Politics, Military, Military Post-Civil War
Aaronsburg Story, The		October 23, 1997	Pa. 45, E end of Aaronsburg	Roadside	African American, Ethnic & Immigration, Religion
Andrew G. Curtin		October 9, 1950	Allegheny St. at Cherry Lane, Bellefonte	City	Education, Government & Politics, Government & Politics 19th Century, Governors
Anna Wagner Keichline		October 12, 2002	126 West High Street, Bellefonte; 40.91182°N 77.77873°W	City	Buildings, Invention, Military, Military Post-Civil War, Professions & Vocations, Women
Bald Eagle's Nest		August 26, 1947	U.S. 220 & Pa. 114 at Milesburg; 40.943°N 77.78678°W	Roadside	Native American
Bellefonte		May 8, 1947	PA 150 at south end of town, near Reynolds Ave., Bellefonte; 40.912°N 77.77808°W	Roadside	Cities & Towns
Bellefonte Air Mail Field		June 1, 1969	Pa. 550 (E. Bishop St.) at high school, Bellefonte; 40.91407°N 77.7617°W	Roadside	Business & Industry, Transportation
Centre County		May 10, 1982	County Courthouse, Allegheny St. at High St., Bellefonte; 40.9122°N 77.77773°W	City	Education, Government & Politics, Government & Politics 19th Century
Centre Furnace		April 29, 1947	Porter Road, 150 feet north of East College Avenue (Pa. 26), State College; 40.80605°N 77.84337°W	Roadside	Business & Industry, Coal, Furnaces, Iron
Centre Furnace - PLAQUE		October 1922	Centre Furnace Mansion, 1001 E. College Ave. (PA 26), State College	Plaque	American Revolution, Furnaces, Iron, Military
Eagle Ironworks		April 29, 1947	Pa. 150 (former U.S. 220) 2.8 miles NE of Milesburg; 40.97633°N 77.74328°W	Roadside	Business & Industry, Iron
Great Shamokin Path		August 23, 1950	Pa. 150, 4 miles NE of Howard; 41.06002°N 77.6183°W	Roadside	Native American, Paths & Trails, Transportation
Indian Paths		October 24, 1972	Pa. 350 S of Philipsburg (Missing)	Roadside	Native American
John I. Thompson Grain Elevator and Coal Sheds		July 21, 2006	137 Mt. Nittany Rd., Lemont, across from grain elevator 40.8103°N 77.81733°W	Roadside	Agriculture, Buildings, Coal, Education, Railroads, Transportation
John Montgomery Ward		September 16, 2000	236 East Lamb St., Bellefonte; 40.91572°N 77.77643°W	City	Baseball, Labor, Sports
Juniata Iron		May 29, 1947	US 220 ~1.3 miles SW of Unionville at Barr Lane	Roadside	Business & Industry, Coal, Iron
Juniata Iron		May 6, 1947	US 220 near US 322, north side, 1.8 miles NE of Port Matilda; 40.82597°N 78.02292°W	Roadside	Business & Industry, Coal, Iron
Mills Brothers, The		June 13, 1992	213 W. High St., between Water & Spring, Bellefonte; 40.91167°N 77.78007°W	City	African American, Business & Industry, Performers
Pennsylvania Match Factory		June 26, 2004	Willowbank St. (PA 150) at Phoenix Ave., Bellefonte; 40.90792°N 77.78195°W	Roadside	Business & Industry, Entrepreneurs, Labor
Pennsylvania State University, The		April 30, 1947	Atherton St. (Bus. US 322) between Curtin Rd. & W Park Ave., State College; 40.7962°N 77.8712°W	Roadside	Agriculture, Education
Philip Benner		May 2, 1947	E College Ave. (Rt. 26), at Shiloh Rd., NE of State College (near Dale Summit); 40.8343°N 77.79645°W	Roadside	Business & Industry, Government & Politics, Iron
Philip Benner		May 2, 1947	Buffalo Run Rd. (Rt. 550) at Rock Rd., at Buffalo Run Church, just S of Bellefonte; 40.8747°N 77.8474°W	Roadside	Business & Industry, Government & Politics, Iron
Plumbe Forge		May 1969	Pa. 504, 6 miles E of Philipsburg; 40.9091°N 78.1045°W	Roadside	Business & Industry, Iron
Potter's Fort		May 5, 1947	S Pennsylvania Ave. (PA 144) at S Miles Alley, SE of Centre Hall; 40.83892°N 77.777°W	Roadside	American Revolution, Military
Scotia		August 1, 1954	off the Gray's Woods exit of US 220/322, on Gray's Woods Blvd. / Scotia Rd., NW of State College in Patton Twp. 40.81362°N 77.94072°W	Roadside	Business & Industry, Iron, Railroads
Union Cemetery		September 7, 1992	At entrance at E Howard St., near Cowdrick Alley, Bellefonte; 40.91436°N 77.77383°W	Roadside	Government & Politics, Government & Politics 19th Century, Governors, Religion
Union Church		November 2, 1967	Presqueisle St. (US 322) near N 7th St., Philipsburg; 40.8982°N 78.2173°W	City	Education, Religion
Warriors Path		March 23, 1949	N Eagle Valley Rd. (PA 150) near Walnut St. (PA 26), 2.2 miles NE of Howard; 41.02515°N 77.66613°W	Roadside	Native American, Paths & Trails, Transportation
William F. Packer		May 19, 1971	N Eagle Valley Rd. (PA 150) at Walnut St. (PA 26), Howard; 41.02165°N 77.67025°W	Roadside	Government & Politics, Government & Politics 19th Century, Governors, Professions & Vocations, Publishing, Transportation

== See also ==
- List of Pennsylvania state historical markers
- National Register of Historic Places listings in Centre County, Pennsylvania
