= Bellefonte Historic District =

Historic district in Pennsylvania, United States

- U.S. National Register of Historic Places
- U.S. Historic district
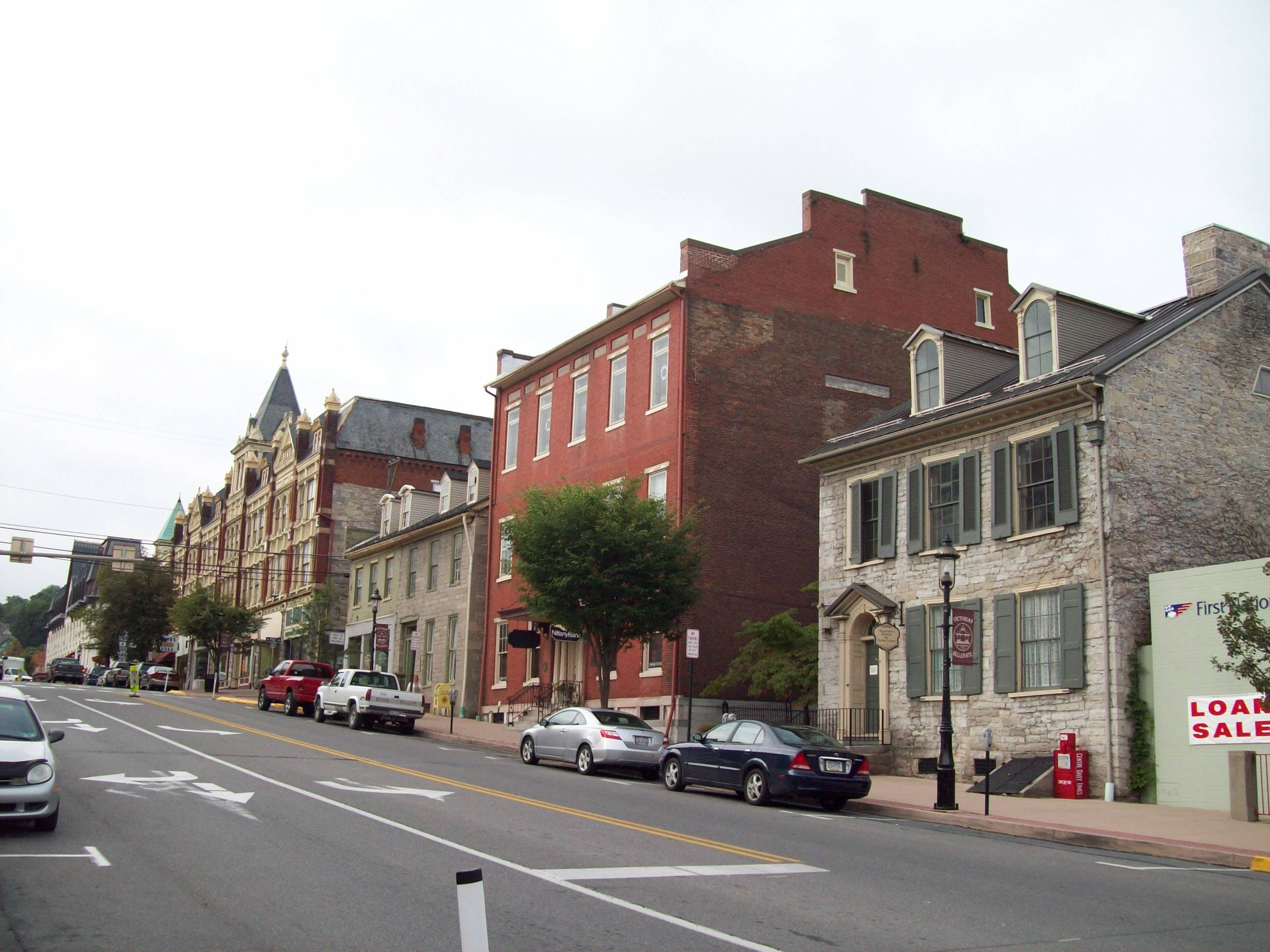
- N. Allegheny St., Bellefonte Historic District, August 2010

- Location within Pennsylvania Location within the United States
- Location: Roughly bounded by Stony Batter, Ardell Alley, Thomas, Armor, Penn, Ridge and Logan Sts., Bellefonte, Pennsylvania
- Coordinates: 40°54′48″N 77°46′43″W
- Area: 132 acres (53 ha)
- Built: 1795
- Built by: Cole, John Robert; Et al.
- Architectural style: Second Empire, Italianate, Georgian
- NRHP reference No.: 77001136
- Added to NRHP: August 12, 1977

Bellefonte Historic District is a national historic district located at Bellefonte, Centre County, Pennsylvania. The district encompasses 296 contributing buildings in the central business district and surrounding residential area of Bellefonte. The oldest building in the district is the Col. James Dunlop House dated to 1795. Notable non-residential buildings include the St. John's Roman Catholic Church, Crider Exchange (1889), Temple Court Building (1894), First National Bank Building, W.F. Reynolds and Co. Bank Building, and Pennsylvania Railroad Station. Located in the district and listed separately are the Brockerhoff Hotel, Centre County Courthouse, Gamble Mill, McAllister-Beaver House, and Miles-Humes House. The Bellefonte Academy and the Bush House Hotel were previously listed on the register until they burned to the ground in 2004 and 2006, respectively.

It was added to the National Register of Historic Places in 1977.
