= John Heston =

John Heston may refer to:

- Ivano Staccioli, Italian film actor, credited as John Heston
- John W. Heston, American academic and president of Washington State University
