= George Lilley =

George Lilley may refer to:

- George L. Lilley (1859–1909), United States Representative and Governor of Connecticut
- George W. Lilley (1850–1904), American academic, professor of mathematics and university president
