= Spring Township, Centre County, Pennsylvania =

Township in Pennsylvania, US

Coordinates: 40°54′00″N 77°45′29″W

- Township
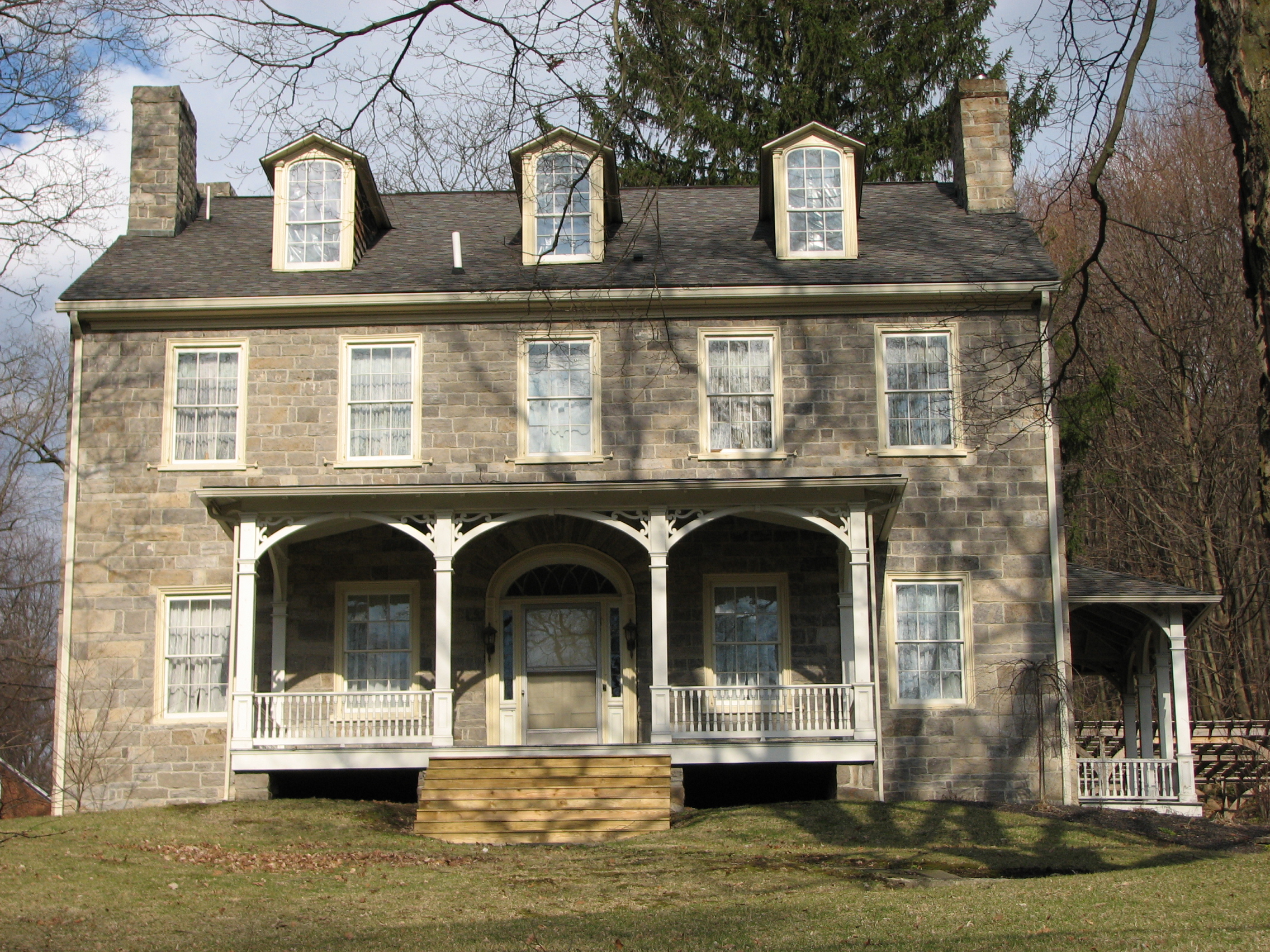
- The Bellefonte Forge House, a historic site in the township

- Logo

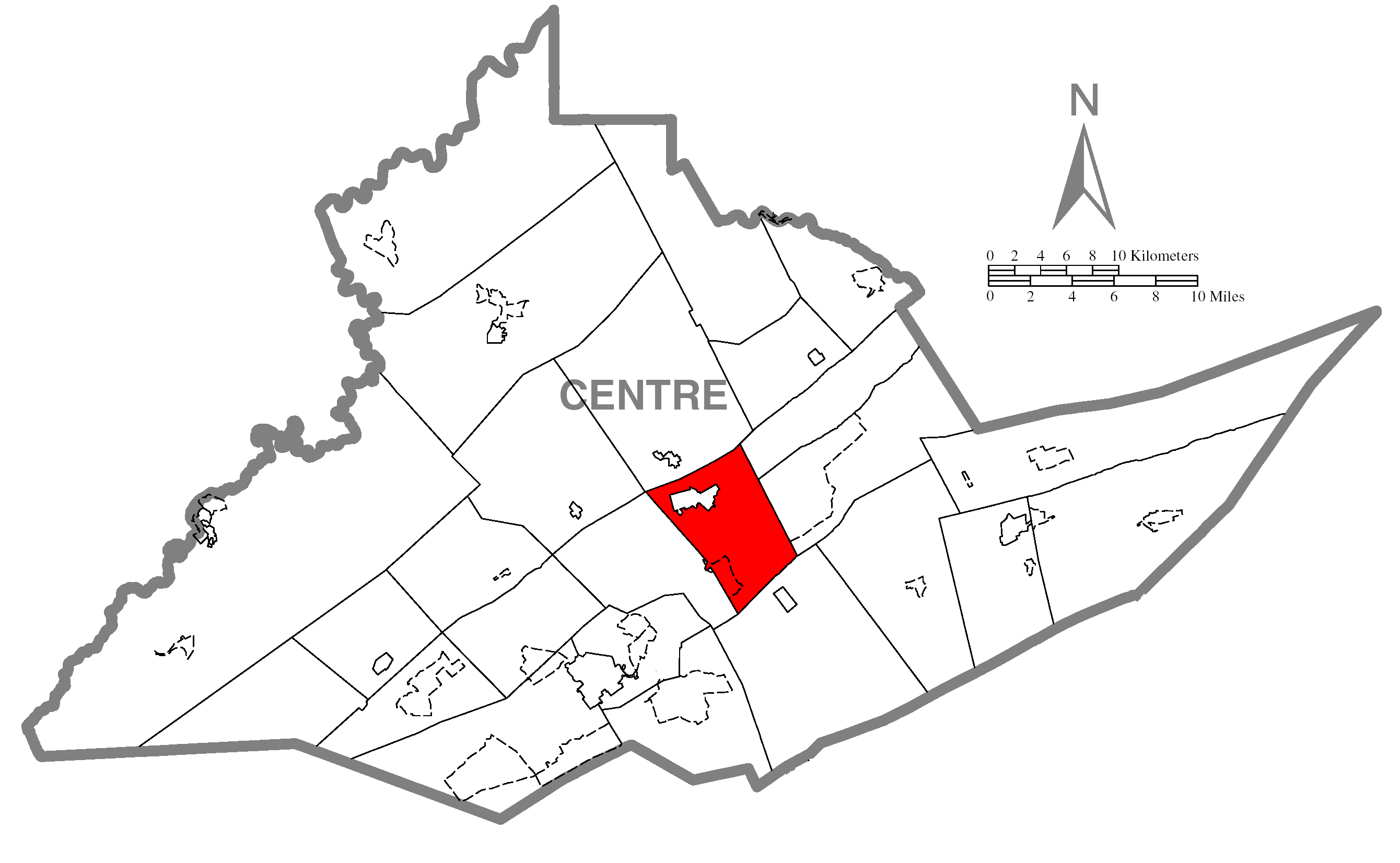
- Map of Centre County, Pennsylvania highlighting Spring Township

- Map of Centre County, Pennsylvania
- Country: United States
- State: Pennsylvania
- County: Centre
- Settled: 1772
- Incorporated: 1795

Area
  - Total: 27.14 sq mi (70.29 km^{2})
  - Land: 27.13 sq mi (70.27 km^{2})
  - Water: 0.0039 sq mi (0.01 km^{2})

Population (2020)
  - Total: 8,051 ▲
  - Estimate (2021): 8,043
  - Density: 283/sq mi (109.3/km^{2})
- FIPS code: 42-027-72832
- Website: www.springtownship.org

Spring Township is a township in Centre County, Pennsylvania, United States. It is part of the State College, Pennsylvania Metropolitan Statistical Area. The population was 8,051 at the 2020 census, which was a 7.8% increase from the 2010 census.

== History ==
The Bellefonte Forge House and Logan Furnace Mansion are listed on the National Register of Historic Places.

== Geography ==
According to the United States Census Bureau, the township has a total area of 27.1 square miles (70.3 km^{2}), of which 0.004 square miles (0.01 km^{2}), or 0.02%, is water.

Spring Township is bordered by Boggs Township to the northwest, Marion and Walker townships to the northeast, Potter Township to the southeast, and Benner Township to the southwest. The township surrounds the county seat, Bellefonte. The communities of Axemann, Coleville, and Pleasant Gap are in Spring Township.

The township contains part of the census-designated place of Zion.

== Demographics ==
Historical population
Census	Pop.	Note	%±
2000	6,117		—
2010	7,470		22.1%
2020	8,051		7.8%
2021 (est.)	8,043		−0.1%
U.S. Decennial Census

As of the census of 2000, there were 6,117 people, 2,456 households, and 1,726 families residing in the township. The population density was 236.6 inhabitants per square mile (91.4/km^{2}). There were 2,559 housing units at an average density of 99.0 units per square mile (38.2 units/km^{2}). The racial makeup of the township was 98.58% White, 0.25% African American, 0.07% Native American, 0.16% Asian, 0.10% Pacific Islander, 0.15% from other races, and 0.70% from two or more races. Hispanic or Latino of any race were 0.46% of the population.

There were 2,456 households, out of which 31.5% had children under the age of 18 living with them, 58.9% were married couples living together, 7.9% had a female householder with no husband present, and 29.7% were non-families. 24.6% of all households were made up of individuals, and 8.0% had someone living alone who was 65 years of age or older. The average household size was 2.47 and the average family size was 2.97.

In the township the population was spread out, with 24.5% under the age of 18, 6.4% from 18 to 24, 32.7% from 25 to 44, 23.7% from 45 to 64, and 12.7% who were 65 years of age or older. The median age was 38 years. For every 100 females there were 93.4 males. For every 100 females age 18 and over, there were 91.2 males.

The median income for a household in the township was $39,042, and the median income for a family was $46,632. Males had a median income of $30,859 versus $25,558 for females. The per capita income for the township was $18,896. About 4.9% of families and 7.9% of the population were below the poverty line, including 16.2% of those under age 18 and 5.9% of those age 65 or over.

== Public safety ==
Spring Township is served by the Spring Township Police Department.

Pleasant Gap Fire Company provides both firefighting and ambulance services. Although located in Bellefonte, Logan Fire Company, Undine Fire Company, and Bellefonte EMS also serve parts of Spring Township.

== Transportation ==
Highways include:

- Interstate 80
- Interstate 99
- U.S. Route 220
- Pennsylvania Route 26
- Pennsylvania Route 64
- Pennsylvania Route 144
- Pennsylvania Route 550
