= Restek =

American chromatography company

Restek Corporation is an employee-owned American chromatography company headquartered in Benner Township, near Bellefonte, Pennsylvania.

== History ==
Restek was founded in 1985 by Paul Silvis, who had previously worked for seven years as a research chemist at Supelco in Centre County. The company began operations in a small business incubator in central Pennsylvania, manufacturing fused silica columns for gas chromatography. In 1987, it developed a coating technology for chromatography tubing called Silcosteel.

During the 1990s, Restek opened offices in Germany and France and began selling liquid chromatography columns.

In 2008, Restek announced plans to increase employee ownership of the company from 22 percent to 100 percent through an employee stock ownership plan (ESOP). Under the arrangement, employees could use their 401(k) savings to buy shares from the company's original shareholders, and the transition was completed on December 31, 2008. As part of the transaction, Restek's Performance Coatings division became a separate company, SilcoTek, that develops chemical vapor deposition coatings. Silvis served as chairman of Restek's board for 37 years.

In February 2009, Restek opened its first office in Asia, a branch in the Shimbashi district of Tokyo.

In January 2010, Restek acquired Glastron Inc., a maker of specialty glassware and electronics based in Vineland, New Jersey. In the same year, Bryan Wolcott, who had joined Restek in 1997 and later served as its chief financial officer, was appointed as chief executive.

In 2012, Restek acquired the German company MicroQuartz and the Italian company Superchrom in 2013, the same year it opened an office in China. In 2016, it bought the 80 percent of its British distributor, Thames Restek, that it did not already own.

In December 2017, Shimadzu Scientific Instruments agreed to distribute Restek's chromatography consumables in the United States, Latin America, and the Caribbean. Wolcott retired as president and CEO on December 31, 2023, and was succeeded by Bill Arrowsmith, who had joined Restek as chief financial officer in 2017 and became general manager in January 2023. In January 2026, Restek introduced the RMX line of gas chromatography columns.
