= South Ward School (Bellefonte, Pennsylvania) =

- U.S. National Register of Historic Places
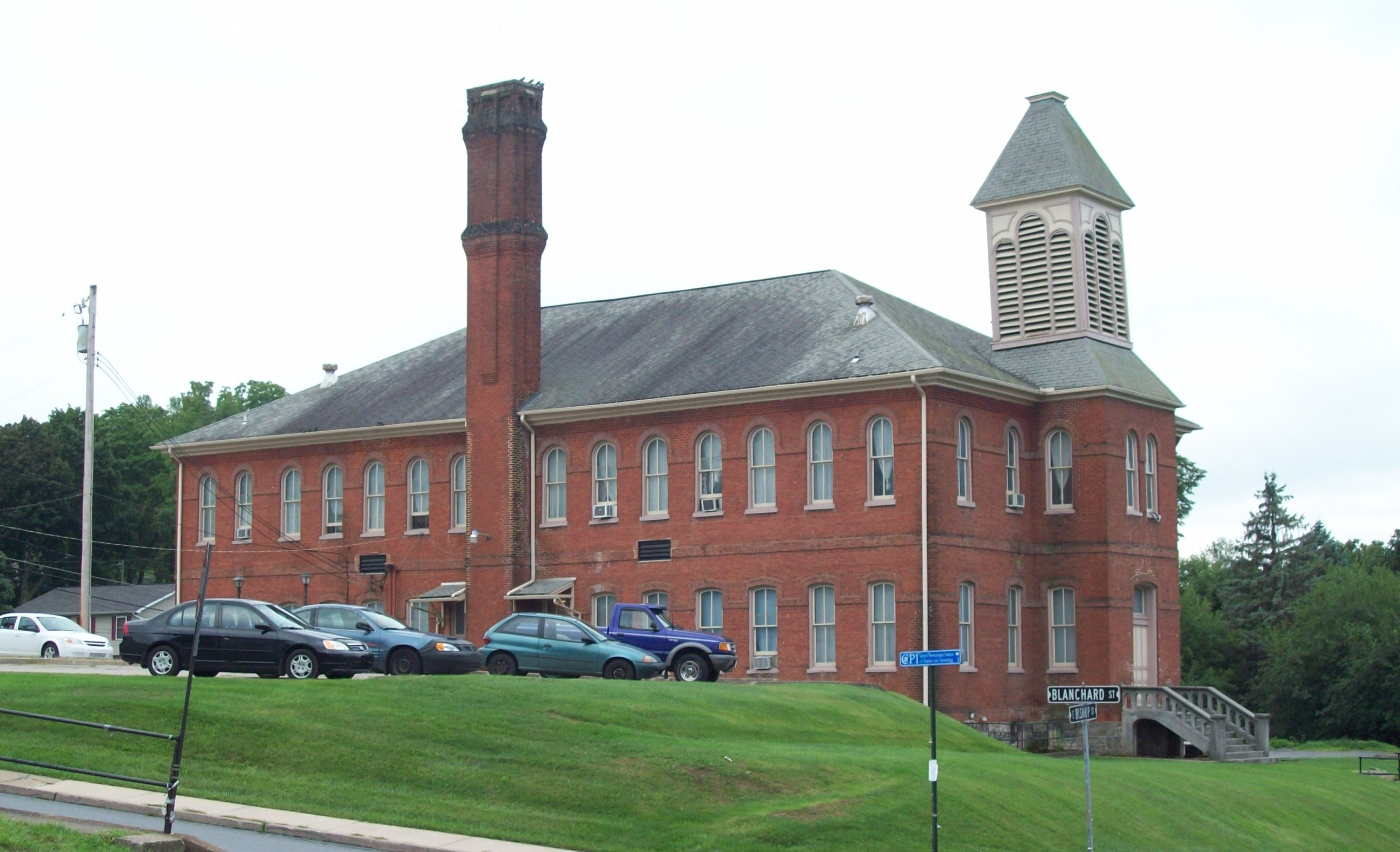
- South Ward School, August 2010

- Location within Pennsylvania Location within the United States
- Location: Bishop St., Bellefonte, Pennsylvania
- Coordinates: 40°54′40″N 77°46′23″W
- Area: 0.5 acres (0.20 ha)
- Built: 1887
- Architect: Cole, Robert
- Architectural style: Queen Anne, Italianate
- NRHP reference No.: 78002360
- Added to NRHP: February 23, 1978

The South Ward School is an historic school building in Bellefonte, Centre County, Pennsylvania, United States.

It was added to the National Register of Historic Places in 1978.

== History and architectural features ==
Built in 1887, this historic structure is a large, two-story, Victorian, eclectic brick building that measures one hundred feet by fifty feet, has a hip roof, and has Italianate and Queen Anne design elements. The building features a three-story bell tower with a steeply pitched hipped roof. The building has been converted to apartments.
