= Belle Howard =

American dramatic reader (1857–1947)

Louisa Belle Howard
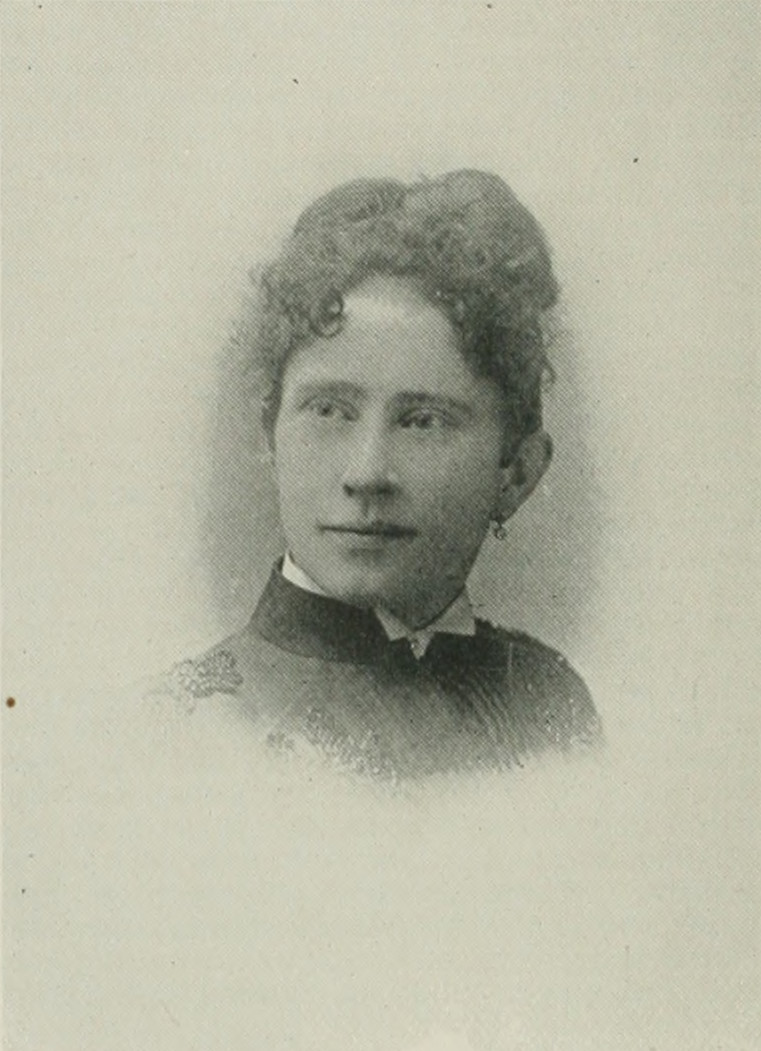
- Portrait photo from A Woman of the Century
- Born: August 27, 1857; Bellefonte, Pennsylvania
- Died: November 4, 1947; Emporia, Kansas
- Burial place: Maplewood Cemetery
- Occupation(s): School teacher and music teacher
- Spouse: Ervin P. Howard
- Children: 2

Louisa Belle Howard (August 27, 1857 – November 4, 1947) was an educator, dramatic reader and music teacher.

== Early life ==
Louisa Belle Howard was born in Bellefonte, Pennsylvania, on August 27, 1857. She was the only daughter of Samuel Gill and Mary Spencer (1834–1906), and granddaughter of William Spencer, an Emporia pioneer.

With her parents, at the age of eight years, she moved to Emporia, Kansas, where she was placed in the model department of the State Normal School, and remained a student in that institution for ten years.

Howard inherited from her father musical talent of a high order, and literary talent from her mother. Her musical studies went hand-in-hand with her literary work.

== Career ==
At the age of eighteen, Belle Howard began to teach.

She gave lessons in music along with her school teaching. After seven years of successful work in the public schools of Lyon County, Kansas, in the vicinity of Emporia, Howard moved with her family to El Dorado, Kansas, teaching in the El Dorado city schools with marked success for three years.

She resigned her position in El Dorado to devote her energies exclusively to musical and literary work, and organized a prosperous music school at her home. When Garfield University was opened in Wichita, Kansas, she moved there from El Dorado for further study and development for herself and her children. She obtained a position in the Wichita schools with a salary sufficient to meet all her expenses, tuition at the university and support of her family.

Twenty-five years of Howard's life were spent in the school room, as either student and teacher. She was connected with the Mozart Conservatory of Music and the Western School of Elocution and Oratory. She also taught at Guthrie, Oklahoma, the college at Waitsburg, Washington, and the Grandview School near Emporia.

She entertained generally in churches and was assisted by her daughter.

== Personal life ==
Soon after starting a career as a teacher, Belle Howard married Dr. Ervin P. Howard (died in 1917), but it was an unfortunate marriage, and after three years, she was left alone with her two infant children. Among her other duties was the care of an invalid mother. After years of struggles, she failed in health and was forced to abandon labor of all kinds. After two years of rest she gained strength enough to take up again life's duties, and with her twelve-year-old daughter, May Belle, began to give musical and elocutionary entertainments.

Many painful experiences came to her, accompanied by the serious and protracted illness of her mother, herself, and lastly her son, but she persevered in her life's work and ambition. Her daughter became, at the same time, a violinist, elocutionist and vocalist of marked skill.

Later in life, she lived in Wichita with her daughter May Belle Howard (1879–1968) and son Guello/Guy Payne Howard.

She died on November 11, 1947, at her home at 1425 Lawrence, Emporia, Kansas, and was buried at Maplewood Cemetery.
