= William Thomas House =

Historic home in Pennsylvania, United States

- U.S. National Register of Historic Places
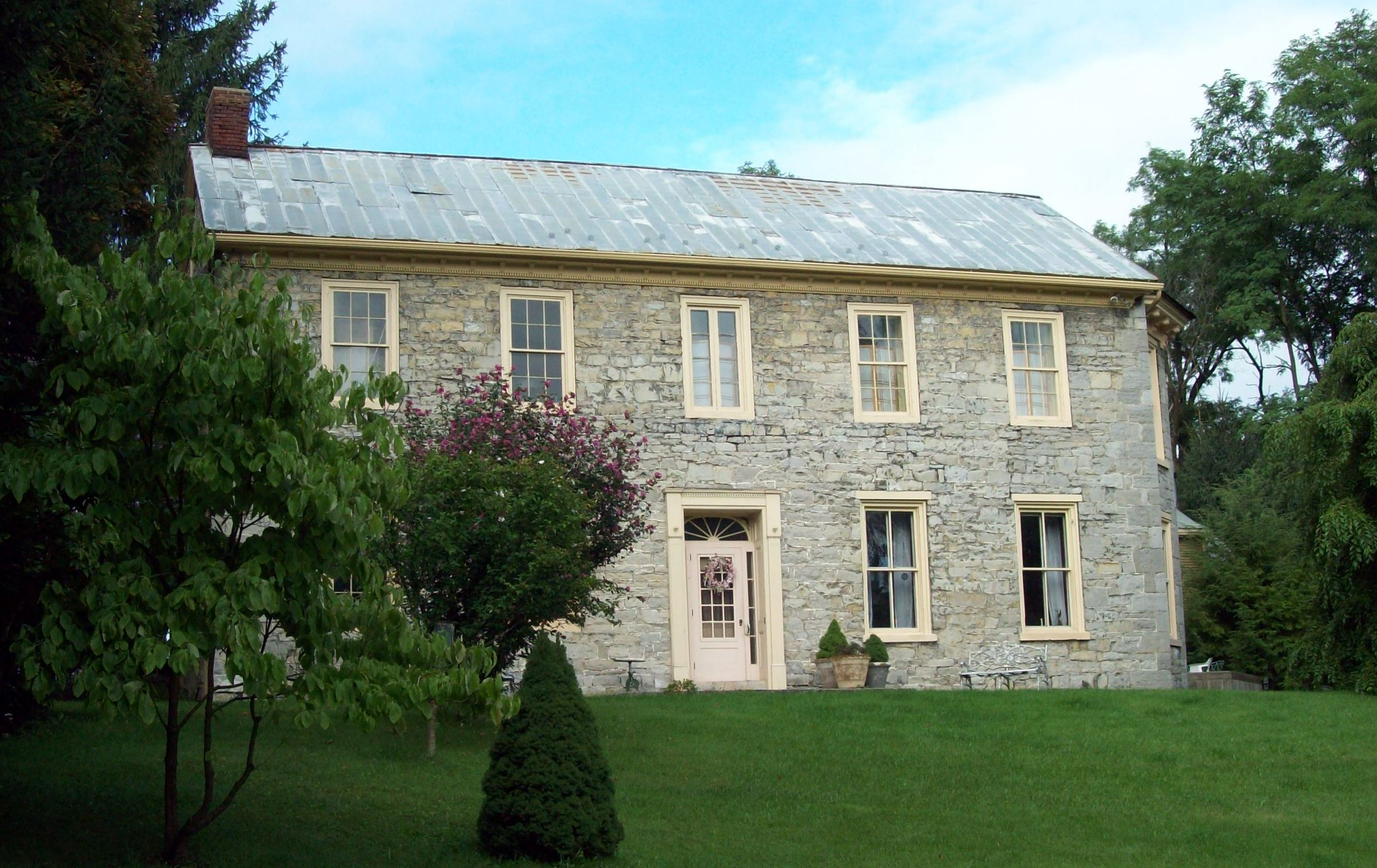
- William Thomas House, August 2010

- Location within Pennsylvania Location within the United States
- Location: 266 N. Thomas St., Bellefonte, Pennsylvania
- Coordinates: 40°54′54″N 77°47′9″W
- Area: less than one acre
- Built: c. 1785, 1834
- Architectural style: Georgian
- NRHP reference No.: 76001620
- Added to NRHP: November 13, 1976

The William Thomas House, also known as Wren's Nest and the Thomas Homestead, is an historic home that is located in Bellefonte, Centre County, Pennsylvania, United States.

It was added to the National Register of Historic Places in 1976.

== History and architectural features ==
This historic structure consists of three sections: an L-shaped stone house that was built c. 1785, and a two-story, five-bay rectangular, limestone house that was designed in the Georgian style. The first section was built using eighteenth-century stone construction methods; the latter section was built in 1834. The third area, which was also created in 1834, was added to "tie the two sections together."
