= Bellefonte, Pennsylvania =

Borough in Pennsylvania, US

Bellefonte
- Borough
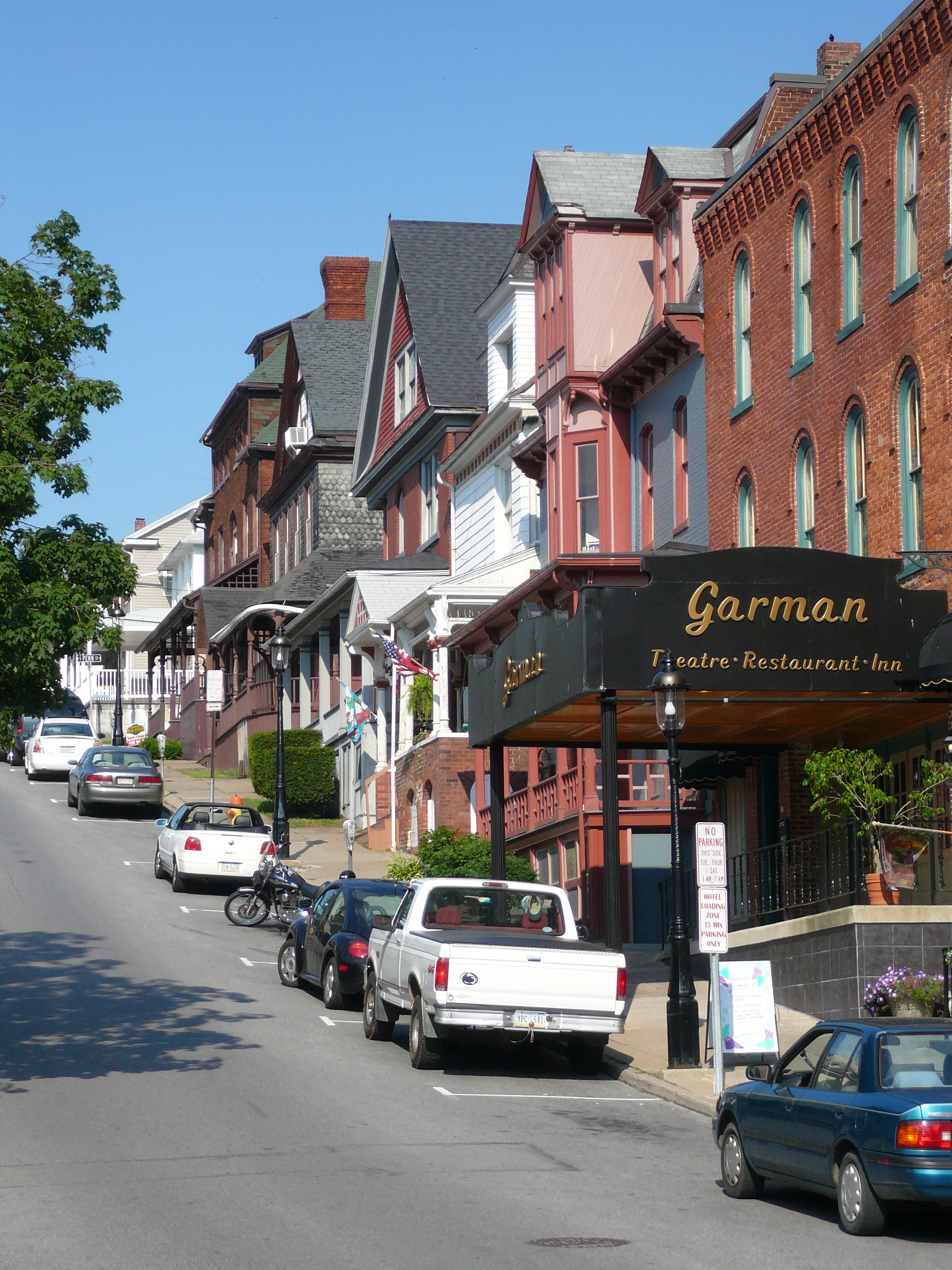
- Downtown Bellefonte

- Seal Logo

- Location of Bellefonte in Centre County, Pennsylvania

- Location of Centre County in Pennsylvania

- Location within the U.S. state of Pennsylvania Bellefonte (the United States)
- Coordinates: 40°54′53″N 77°46′29″W
- Country: United States
- State: Pennsylvania
- County: Centre
- Settled: 1795
- Incorporated (borough): 1806

Government
  - Mayor: Gene Johnson

Area
  - Total: 1.85 sq mi (4.78 km^{2})
  - Land: 1.85 sq mi (4.78 km^{2})
  - Water: 0 sq mi (0.00 km^{2})
- Elevation: 919 ft (280 m)

Population (2020)
  - Total: 6,105
  - Density: 3,310.2/sq mi (1,278.08/km^{2})
- Demonyms: Bellefontian; Bellefutian
- Time zone: Eastern (EST)
  - Summer (DST): EDT
- ZIP Code: 16823
- Area code: 814
- FIPS code: 42-05256
- Website: bellefonte.net

Pennsylvania Historical Marker
- Designated: May 08, 1947

Bellefonte (/bɛlfɒnt/ BEL-font) is a borough in and the county seat of Centre County, Pennsylvania, United States. It is approximately 12 miles northeast of State College and is part of the State College, Pennsylvania metropolitan statistical area. As of the 2020 census, Bellefonte had a population of 6,105. It houses the Centre County Courthouse, located downtown on the diamond. Bellefonte has also been home to five of Pennsylvania's governors, as well as two other governors. All seven are commemorated in a monument located at Talleyrand Park.

The town features many examples of Victorian architecture. It is also home to the natural spring, "la belle fonte", bestowed by Charles Maurice de Talleyrand-Périgord during a land-speculation visit to central Pennsylvania in 1790, from which the town derives its name. The spring, which serves as the town's water supply, has since been covered to comply with DEP water purity laws.

The early development of Bellefonte had been as a "natural town." It started with one house and a crossroad, then iron was found and the town grew.

== History ==
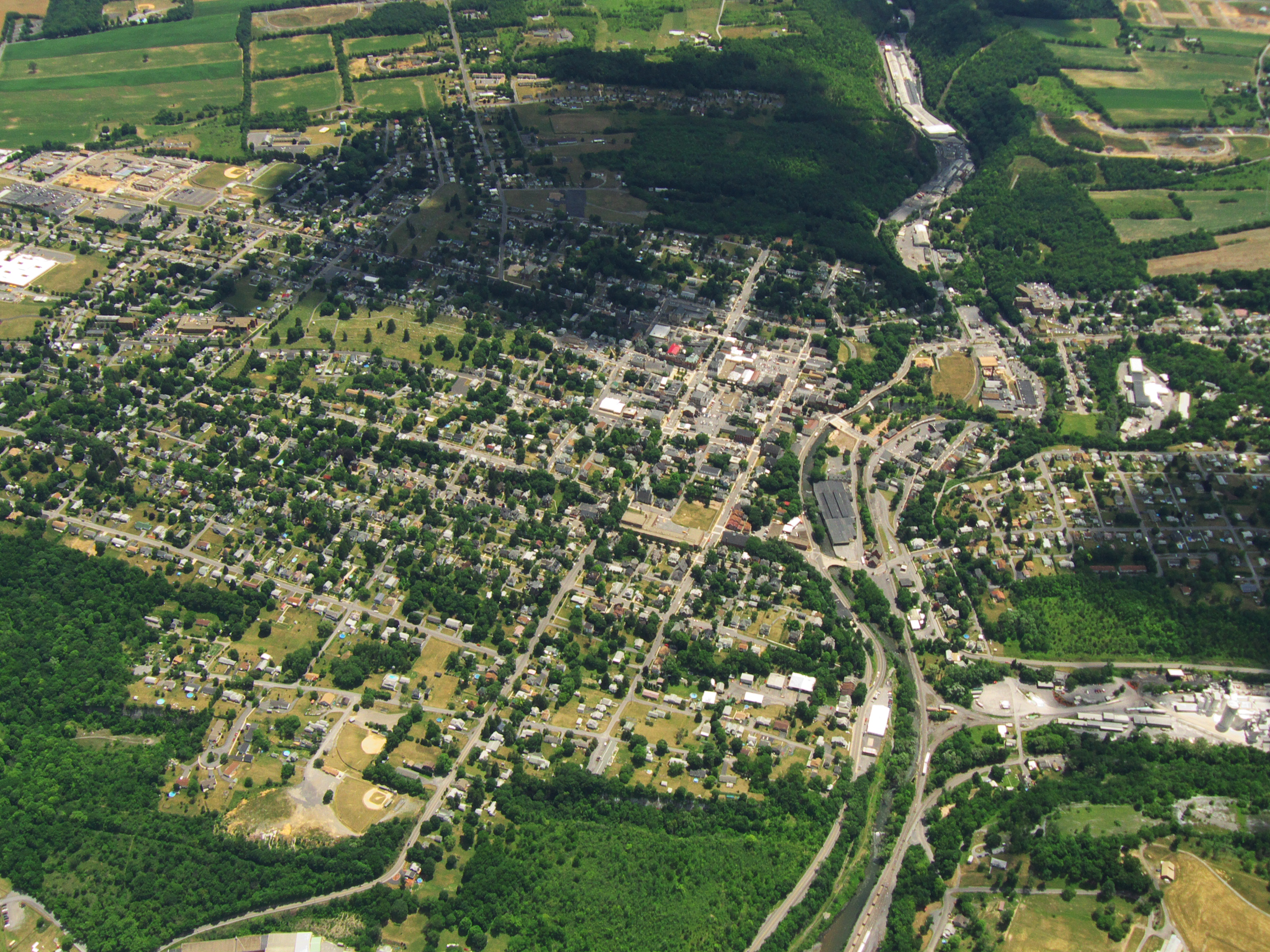
Aerial photo of Bellefonte in July 2007

William Lamb sold his mill to John Dunlop in 1794. The following year, John's father James Dunlop and John's son-in-law James Harris (1756–1841) laid out the town that would become known as Bellefonte.

As the years went by, Bellefonte boomed and soon became the most influential town between Pittsburgh and Harrisburg.

== Bellefonte Historic District ==
The Bellefonte Historic District was added to the National Register of Historic Places in 1977. Other buildings on the National Register of Historic Places are: Bellefonte Armory, Bellefonte Forge House, Brockerhoff Hotel, Centre County Courthouse, Gamble Mill, McAllister-Beaver House, Miles-Humes House, Pennsylvania Match Company, South Ward School, and the William Thomas House. Bellefonte Academy was listed until 2008; it was destroyed by fire in 2004.

=== Bush House Hotel ===
Bush House Hotel was built in 1868–69 by Bellefonte attorney and developer Daniel G. Bush. It was one of the first hotels in the country to have electric lights. A man would stand at the train station and call out to the passengers, "Walk ya' to the Bush House." The Brockerhoff House, the Haag House, and other area hotels were competitors. Many notable guests stayed at the Bush House including Thomas Edison. The Bush House burned down on February 8, 2006.

=== The Cadillac Building ===
This building was designed by pioneering female architect Anna Wagner Keichline, a native of Bellefonte, and originally served as a car dealership with a showroom on first floor, a repair shop on the second, and an office and living space on the third floor. The Cadillac Building, so named because it was originally built as a Cadillac dealership in 1916, was a mix use commercial and residential property hit by a devastating fire on December 22, 2009. Christmas tree lights in one of the apartment units were determined to be the cause.

The Cadillac Building was rebuilt in 2016 and is now home to 11 two- and three-bedroom apartment units. It remains a part of the Bellefonte Historic District.

=== Garman Opera House ===
The Garman Opera House was originally built in 1890 and hosted many notable stars of the day, including George Burns and Gracie Allen, Western performer Tom Mix, and illusionist and escape artist Harry Houdini.

The song "After the Ball" was said to have been first sung in public here. It was eventually also used as a movie theater, first showing silent films and then "talkies." By the early 1960s, the property was converted to primarily commercial/warehouse use. In the 1990s, the building was restored and returned to its roots as a live performance venue and cinema.

The opera house was severely damaged by a fire on September 9, 2012, that also destroyed the Garman House Hotel. The cause of the fire has been ruled as arson. Preservationist groups' attempts to save the Garman were unsuccessful and the building was razed in January 2014.

Garman House was rebuilt in 2016 and is now home to 21 one and two bedroom apartment units.

=== Victorian era ===
First-time visitors who walk along the Victorian streets of Bellefonte see primarily Victorian houses. One of many examples is the Hastings Mansion, which was owned by Mrs. John Lane and was bought and remodeled by Governor Daniel H. Hastings.

In the 1800s, the first jail was built. It had a dungeon eight feet underground, which was located on the rear of the lot of the present YMCA. A second jail was on East High Street.

=== Renaissance ===
One of the town's historic sections experienced a renaissance in 2004. The Match Factory (officially the Pennsylvania Match Company), after standing vacant since 1947, was renovated by the American Philatelic Society as their new home, one building at a time. The site was placed on the National Register of Historic Places in 2001.

== Geography ==
Bellefonte is located in the Nittany Valley of the Ridge and Valley Appalachians. It lies 12 miles northeast of State College. According to the U.S. Census Bureau, the borough has a total area of 1.8 square miles (4.7 km^{2}), all land. Bellefonte is surrounded by Spring Township. Spring Creek, a tributary of Bald Eagle Creek, runs through Bellefonte and is spanned by the Bellefonte Veterans Bridge.

Bellefonte is divided into three electoral wards. The West Ward, which was formerly made up the land west of Spring Creek, now also encompasses Big Spring, and much of the Bellefonte Historic District. The South Ward, which was formerly made up of the area south of High Street and Big Spring, now stretches to include the East End. The North Ward, which was formerly made up of the area north of High Street, now sits east of North Ridge Street and stretches to include Park View Heights.

== Demographics ==
Historical population
Census	Pop.	Note	%±
1810	303		—
1820	433		42.9%
1830	698		61.2%
1840	1,032		47.9%
1850	1,179		14.2%
1860	1,477		25.3%
1870	2,655		79.8%
1880	3,026		14.0%
1890	3,946		30.4%
1900	4,216		6.8%
1910	4,145		−1.7%
1920	3,996		−3.6%
1930	4,804		20.2%
1940	5,304		10.4%
1950	5,651		6.5%
1960	6,088		7.7%
1970	6,828		12.2%
1980	6,300		−7.7%
1990	6,358		0.9%
2000	6,395		0.6%
2010	6,187		−3.3%
2020	6,105		−1.3%

As of the 2010 census, the borough had 6,187 people, 2,837 households, and 1,496 families. The borough was 96.3% White, 1.5% Black or African American, 0.1% Native American, 0.5% Asian, 0.3% other, and 1.3% were two or more races. 1.4% of the population was of Hispanic or Latino ancestry. The population density was 3,510.1 inhabitants per square mile (1,355.3/km^{2}). There were 3,038 housing units at an average density of 1,669.2 per square mile (644.5/km^{2}).

Of the 2,837 households, 23.2% had children under the age of 18 living with them, 39.2% were married couples living together, 3.5% had a male householder with no wife present, 10.1% had a female householder with no husband present, and 47.2% were non-families. 38.2% of all households were made up of individuals, and 10.7% had someone living alone who was 65 years of age or older. The average household size was 2.10 and the average family size was 2.81.

The population distribution by age was as follows: 18.4% under the age of 18, 9.3% from 18 to 24, 29.5% from 25 to 44, 25.7% from 45 to 64, and 17.1% who were 65 years of age or older. The median age was 39 years. For every 100 females there were 89.0 males. For every 100 females age 18 and over, there were 87.9 males.

The median income for a household in the borough was $48,211, and the median income for a family was $62,292. The per capita income for the borough was $26,938. About 4.4% of families and 10.2% of the population were below the poverty line, including 3.8% of those under age 18 and 11.0% of those age 65 or over.

== Economy ==
The Bellefonte area, as part of Centre County, typically experiences one of the lowest unemployment rates in the state. The primary industries are education, health care, construction, retail, and government.

=== Major employers ===
- Bellefonte Area School District
- Centre County Government
- Geisinger Health System
- Giant Food Stores
- Government of Pennsylvania
- Hilex Poly
- Restek
- Supelco
- U.S. Federal Government
- Weis Markets
- YMCA of Centre County

== Government ==
=== Federal ===
Bellefonte forms part of Pennsylvania's 15th congressional district. The current representative is Glenn "G.T." Thompson.

=== County ===
Bellefonte is the county seat of Centre County and home to the Centre County Courthouse.

=== Local ===
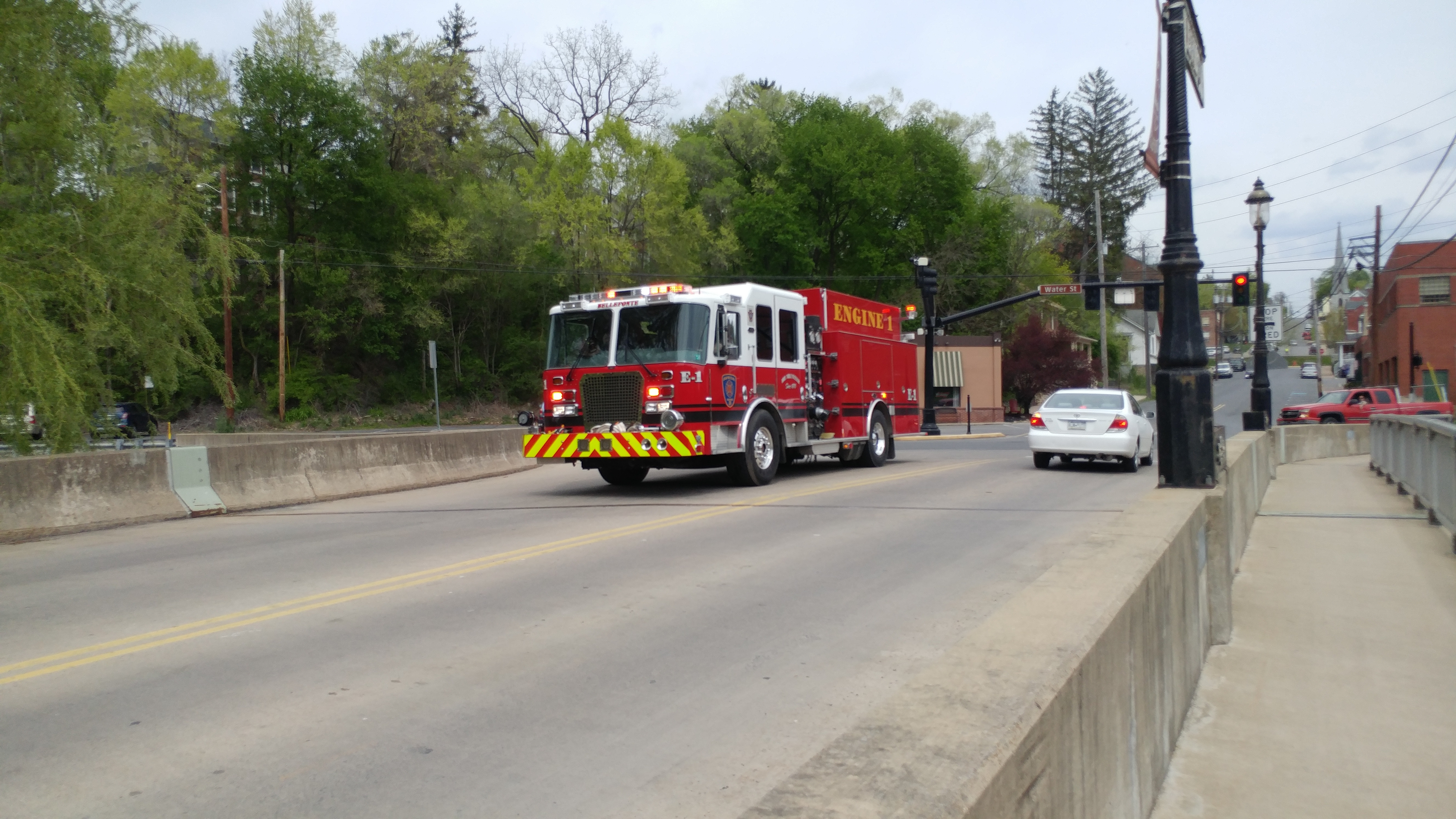
Logan Fire Company Engine 1 responding to a call

The Borough of Bellefonte government is currently run by the following elected officials:

- Mayor: Gene "Buddy" Johnson
- President of Council: Doug Johnson
- Vice President of Council: Kent Bernier
- Council Members:
  - Rita Purnell
  - Kent Bernier
  - Deborah Cleeton
  - Barbara Dann
  - Johanna Sedwick
  - Randall Brachbill
  - Shawna McKeen
  - Doug Johnson
  - Joanne Tosti-Vasey

The law enforcement agency in Bellefonte is the Bellefonte Police Department. The Centre County Sheriff's office is also located in Bellefonte.

The Bellefonte Fire Department is made up of two volunteer companies: Logan Fire Company #1 and Undine Fire Company #2. Ambulance service is provided by Bellefonte EMS, which separated from Logan Fire Company in 1994.

== Education ==
Bellefonte Area School District operates public schools in the borough and wider area. Centre County Christian Academy is a private school located in Bellefonte. Since 1890, Catholic Education has been present in the Bellefonte community and vicinity through Saint John Parochial School. Saint John the Evangelist Roman Catholic School provides 3 and 4 year-old Pre-Kindergarten classes, as well as full-day instruction in Kindergarten through grade 5.

Bellefonte is 10 miles from Pennsylvania State University. Joel Rose of National Public Radio said, "These days, it seems everyone in Bellefonte has ties to Penn State, or knows someone who does."

== Transportation ==
=== Railroads ===
Up until 1946 the Bellefonte Central Railroad served the town on a Bellefonte-Lemont (State College) route. Until 1933 the BCR continued the route south to Tyrone over the Pennsylvania Railroad's former Fairbrook Branch. Additionally, the Pennsylvania Railroad ran passenger trains from Altoona to Williamsport, after Milesburg heading into Bellefonte, then backing out to return to the Bald Eagle Valley Branch's route to continue the trip northeast. The last Altoona - Lock Haven train was between August 1950 and 1951. The PRR also operated trains until the late 1940s from Bellefonte south to Lemont (nearest train station to State College), then east to Northumberland and Sunbury, Pennsylvania.

Bellefonte does not have passenger train service, with the nearest Amtrak stations located in Lewistown (approximately 32 miles away) and Tyrone (approximately 35 miles away) and serving Amtrak's Pennsylvanian train between Pittsburgh and New York City.

=== Roads ===
A turnpike was created in 1822 after ten years of construction. This turnpike, named The Northumberland and Anderson's Creek Turnpike, connected Bellefonte to Clearfield on the west and Sunbury on the east. Today, Pennsylvania Route 550 runs through the town. Interstate 99/US Route 220 pass by the eastern outskirts of the town.

=== Buses ===
Bellefonte no longer offers any bus service

=== Air travel ===
The town is served by the State College Regional Airport in Benner Township for commercial air travel. The borough was previously home to the Bellefonte Air Mail Field. The Bellefonte Airport is a privately owned airport just outside the borough in Benner Township along the Buffalo Run Valley.

== Notable people ==
- George Grey Barnard – sculptor
- Alison Bechdel – cartoonist and graphic novelist
- Clifford Carlson – former University of Pittsburgh men's college basketball coach
- Todd Christensen – former NFL tight end
- Doyle Corman – former member of the Pennsylvania State Senate
- Jake Corman – member of the Pennsylvania State Senate
- Andrew Gregg Curtin – Governor of Pennsylvania (1861–1867)
- Nathan Alan Cutietta – documentary filmmaker
- Robert Alan Cutietta – author, composer, arts leader
- Inka Essenhigh – artist
- Jonathan Frakes – director, Star Trek actor
- Scott Fry – former Director of the Joint Staff for the United States Department of Defense
- Chris Garner – tennis player (R16 in Australian Open 1993)
- John Irvin Gregg – Union army general
- Daniel H. Hastings – Governor of Pennsylvania (1895–1899)
- John W. Heston – former president of three universities
- William Harrison Holly – former United States federal judge
- Belle Howard – dramatic reader and music teacher
- Merle G. Kearns – former member of the Ohio House of Representatives
- Anna Keichline – first female architect to be certified in Pennsylvania
- James Knepper – former member of the Pennsylvania House of Representatives
- Dereck Lively II – professional basketball player
- Braedan Lugue - hip-hop artist, part of the duo Joey Valence & Brae
- Eric Milton – Major League Baseball player
- David Petrikin – former member of the U.S. House of Representatives
- Robert L. Rankin – linguist and scholar of the Siouan languages
- Thomas M. Reynolds – U.S. Congressman
- Jeremy Rose – horse jockey
- Joseph A. Smith – artist and professor at the Pratt Institute
- Matt Suhey – Chicago Bears fullback
- Glenn Thompson – member of the U.S. House of Representatives
- Gregg Troy – college and Olympic swimming coach
- Jeff VanderMeer – author, editor, literary critic
- David Vogan – mathematician
- Jeffrey P. von Arx – President of Fairfield University
- Richard L. Walker – author and former ambassador to South Korea
- John Montgomery Ward – Hall of Fame baseball player

== See also ==
- Bellefonte and Snow Shoe Railroad
- Bellefonte Central Railroad
