= Bush House Hotel =

- U.S. Historic district – Contributing property
- Location within Pennsylvania Location within the United States
- Location: Bellefonte, Pennsylvania
- Coordinates: 40°54′42″N 77°46′52″W
- Built: 1868-69
- Part of: Bellefonte Historic District (ID77001136)
- Added to NRHP: August 12, 1977

The Bush House Hotel was an historic hotel that was located in Bellefonte, Pennsylvania. It was built between 1868 and 1869, and burned down on February 8, 2006.

== History ==
The Bush House was built by Bellefonte attorney and developer Daniel G. Bush between 1868 and 1869. At the time, it was reported to be one of the largest hotels in Pennsylvania outside of Philadelphia. Thomas Edison stayed there while bringing electricity to the town. The Bush House also served other famous guests, such as Henry Ford and Amelia Earhart.

In 1928, the building was sold and soon after renamed the Penn Belle Hotel. The hotel returned to its original "Bush House" name in 1974. Over the years, portions of Bush House were converted to residential apartments. It was also home to several different restaurants and taverns.

It was a contributing property to the Bellefonte Historic District.

== See also ==
- National Register of Historic Places listings in Centre County, Pennsylvania
