= Nathan Cutietta =

American documentary film producer

- Born: November 29, 1980 (age 44); Bellefonte, Pennsylvania, US
- Occupation: Documentary film producer
- Parent: Robert Cutietta

Nathan Cutietta (born November 29, 1980) is best known as a documentary filmmaker. After leaving the film industry, he settled in Ohio as a teacher at Heidelberg University.

== Biography and career ==
Cutietta was born in the small town of Bellefonte, Pennsylvania. Cutietta got his start in television in Tucson, Arizona while working as an editor at Jorgensen Productions, and later at a Warner Brother's Affiliate as a producer. He moved to Los Angeles in 2001 and worked as a director and producer for Fox and Fox Sports.

Cutietta is best known for his television series Lost Legends of the West, a 13-episode folk history of the American West which was nominated for two Emmy Awards. In 2006, Cutietta wrote, directed and produced the documentary Welcome Back Riders, a history of the rise and fall of the 20th Century American Amusement Park. In 2007 he wrote and directed "Eleonore Schoenfeld: Born to Teach," which is a look into the life of Eleonore Schoenfeld—who is considered one of the most influential cellists of the 20th century. The documentary aired on PBS affiliate KCET (Los Angeles) in August 2008. Cutietta is the son of Robert Cutietta an author, researcher, composer, and arts leader.

== Filmography ==
- Lost Legends of the West (Creator, Producer, Writer for Episodes 1–13) (Director on Episode 13) 2003
- Welcome Back Riders (Producer, Director, Writer) 2006
- Eleonore Schoenfeld: Born to Teach (Director, Writer) 2007
