= Bellefonte Forge House =

Historic house in Pennsylvania, United States

- U.S. National Register of Historic Places
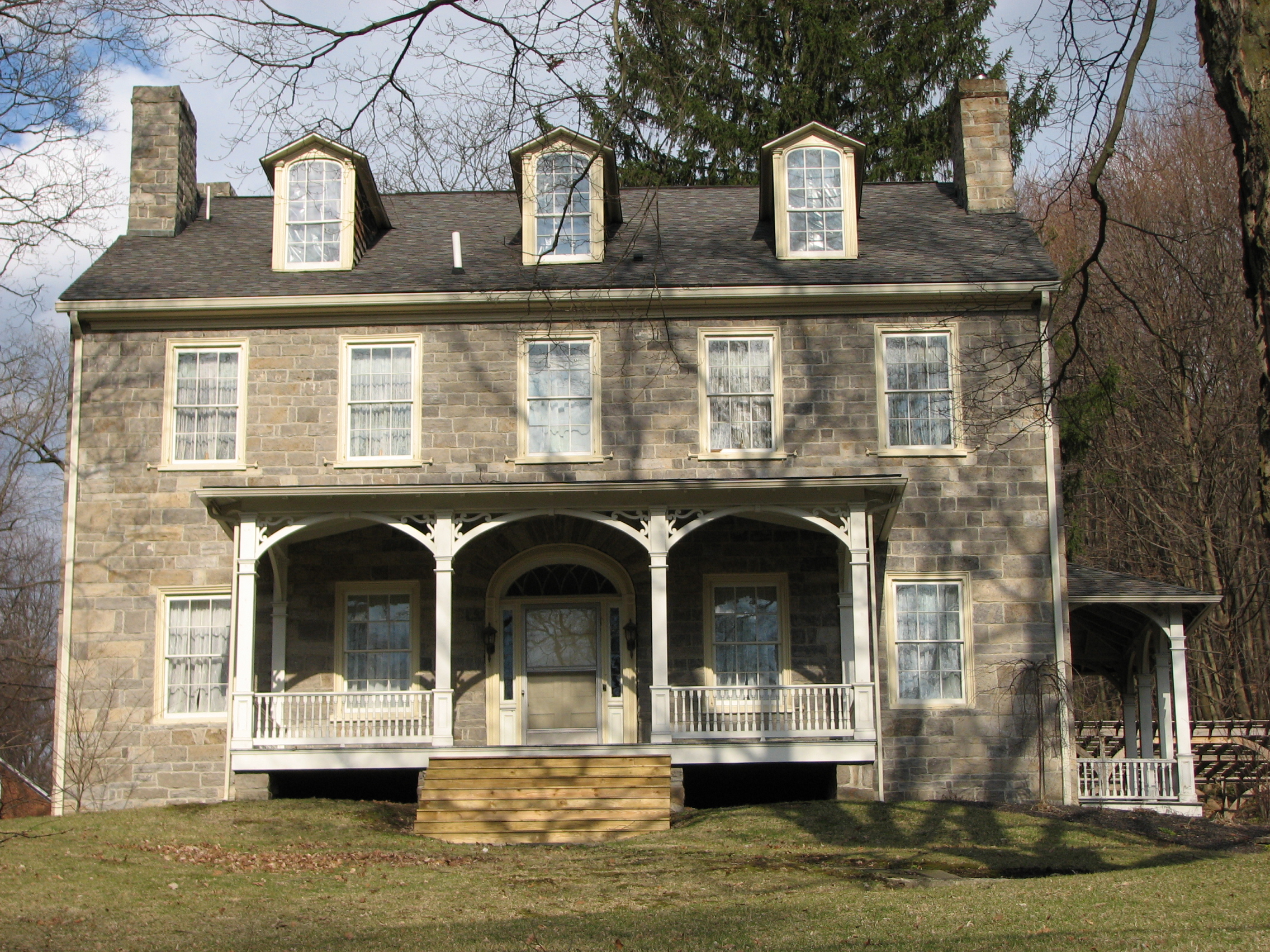
- Bellefonte Forge House, Spring Township, Centre County, Pennsylvania

- Location within Pennsylvania Location within the United States
- Location: 110 Forge Rd; Spring Township, Centre County, Pennsylvania
- Coordinates: 40°54′21″N 77°46′41″W
- Built: 1803
- Architect: Lowry, John G.; Patterson, John
- Architectural style: Federal
- NRHP reference No.: 99001020
- Added to NRHP: August 20, 1999

The Bellefonte Forge House, also known as the John Dunlop House, is located just south of Bellefonte, Pennsylvania, in Spring Township, Centre County. It is listed on the National Register of Historic Places, due to its connection with prominent figures in the iron industry of the early 19th century and because of its domestic architecture influenced by the Federal style.

== Origins ==
It was built in 1803 by an ironmaster, John Dunlop, who lived there with his wife and four daughters until he was killed in an iron mine collapse in October 1814. The house is listed on the National Register of Historic Places.

== Construction ==
Made of limestone, this 2 1/2-story house was constructed in the vernacular form of the Federal or Georgian style with ten and a half foot ceiling heights. It originally had nine fireplaces, but two were removed to make a modern kitchen in the 1930s. It is thought that a John G. Lowry was the architect, as he was the only registered architect in the area at that time and was also in the employment of his cousin, John Dunlop. Building receipts for the finish carpenter, John Patterson, can still be found in the Centre County Library and Historical Museum in Bellefonte.

== Role in the Iron Industry ==
In the late eighteenth and early nineteenth centuries Bellefonte became the center of a large iron industry. John Dunlop was one of the most energetic and prosperous of those that went into that business, building Harmony Forge (1795), Belle Font Forge (1797), Logan Furnace (1797), and Washington Forge (1810). It was his father, Lt. Col. James Dunlop, and his brother-in-law, James Dunlop Harris (1797-1842) one time, Principal engineer of the Pennsylvania Main Line of Public works, who actually laid out the town, now a Borough, of Bellefonte from land that John Dunlop owned.

== After John Dunlop's death ==
After John Dunlop's death, his iron business was rented, then bought by ironmasters in the Valentine family 1815–1879. This home represents the wealth of those ironmasters as the Valentines added the Victorian porches in the 1860s.

== Restoration ==
The Bellefonte Forge House was continuously used until 1994, when it became vacant and was damaged by vandals and animals. However, after 2001 it was restored to its past condition by Michael C. Immel.

Today, the Bellefonte Forge House still overlooks the water of Logan's Branch where John Dunlop started his Belle Font Forge in 1797.
