= Joseph A. Smith (artist) =

American artist

- Born: September 5, 1936 (age 89); Bellefonte, Pennsylvania, US
- Education: Pratt Institute (BFA, MFA); Penn State University
- Style: Illustration, painting
- Website: www.josasmith.com

Joseph Anthony Smith (born September 5, 1936), also known as Jos. A. Smith, is an American artist who is best known for illustrating children's books. He has been a professional artist since 1961 and served as Professor of Fine Arts at the Pratt Institute in Brooklyn, New York, since 1962.

Smith started his career as an editorial illustrator and cartoonist before shifting to children's book illustration. His work is held in permanent collections at the US National Portrait Gallery, Pennsylvania Academy of Fine Arts, and other museums and galleries. He participated in 20 solo exhibitions primarily at colleges and universities but also at Staten Island Museum, Huntington Museum of Art, and Samuel S. Fleisher Art Memorial.

His papers are held at the University of Connecticut Library's Archives and Special Collections in the Thomas J. Dodd Research Center.
