= Logan Furnace Mansion =

Historic house in Pennsylvania, United States

- U.S. National Register of Historic Places
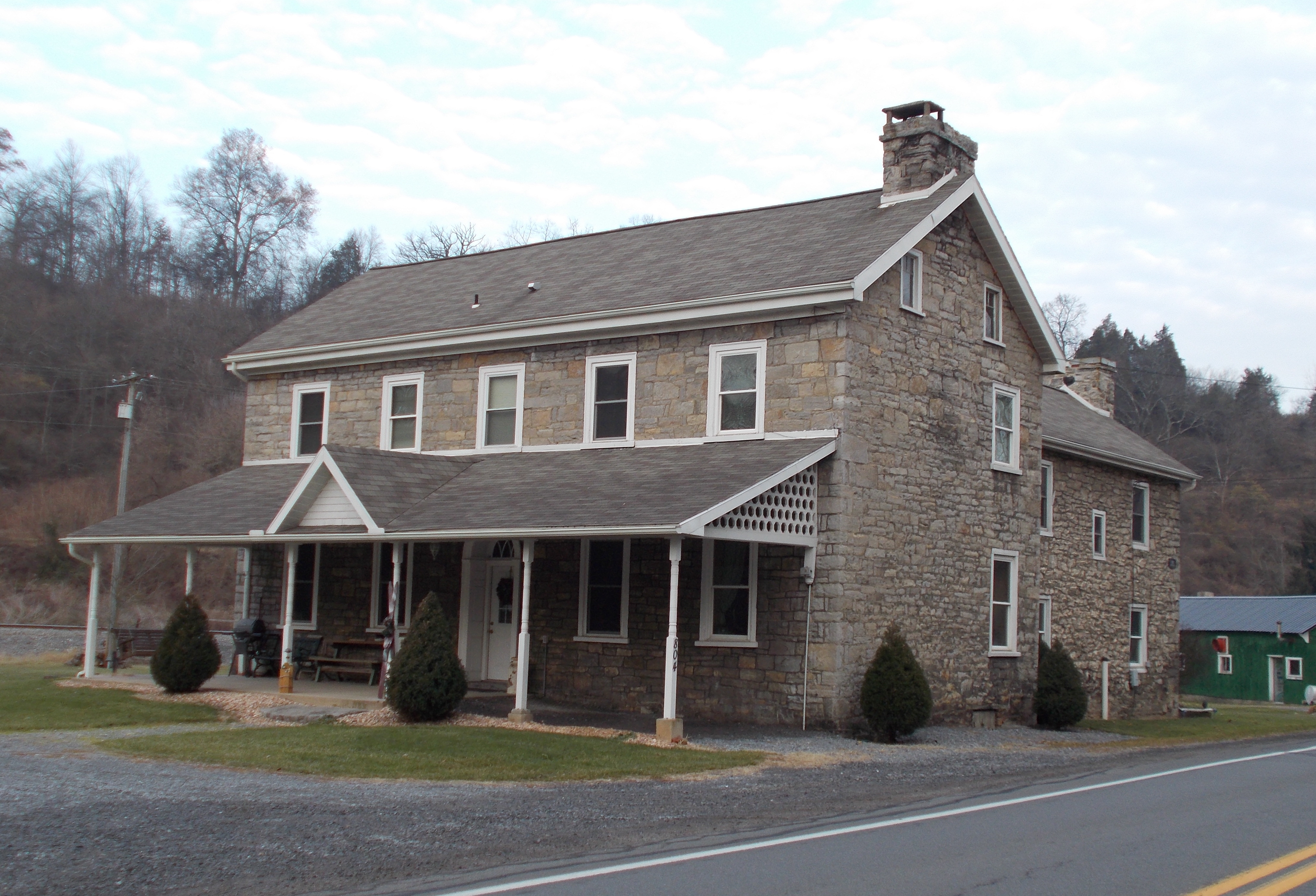
- Logan Furnace Mansion, December 2012

- Location within Pennsylvania Location within the United States
- Nearest city: 3 miles (4.8 km) south of Bellefonte on Pennsylvania Route 144, Spring Township, Pennsylvania
- Coordinates: 40°52′38″N 77°45′51″W
- Area: 0.1 acres (0.040 ha)
- Built: 1798-1800, 1818 Built by John Dunlop (Bellefonte iron master) Stone house and iron furnace capable of 1200 tons of pig iron annually. Stone house, several large mill stones and an iron workers house still visible. Info from Linn's History of Centre County Pa.
- NRHP reference No.: 77001138
- Added to NRHP: April 11, 1977

The Logan Furnace Mansion is an historic home that is located in Spring Township, Centre County, Pennsylvania, United States.

It was added to the National Register of Historic Places in 1977.

== History and architectural features ==
This historic structure is an L-shaped building, consisting of a 2 1/2-story, five-bay stone main house, with a two-story, stone kitchen ell. The ell was the original home and was built between 1798 and 1800. The main house was built in 1818. The house and iron furnace were built by John Dunlop (Bellefonte iron master). By 1826, the furnace was capable of producing 1,200 tons of pig iron per year. The stone house, a few large mill stones, and an iron workers house are still visible.
