= Gamble Mill =

- U.S. National Register of Historic Places
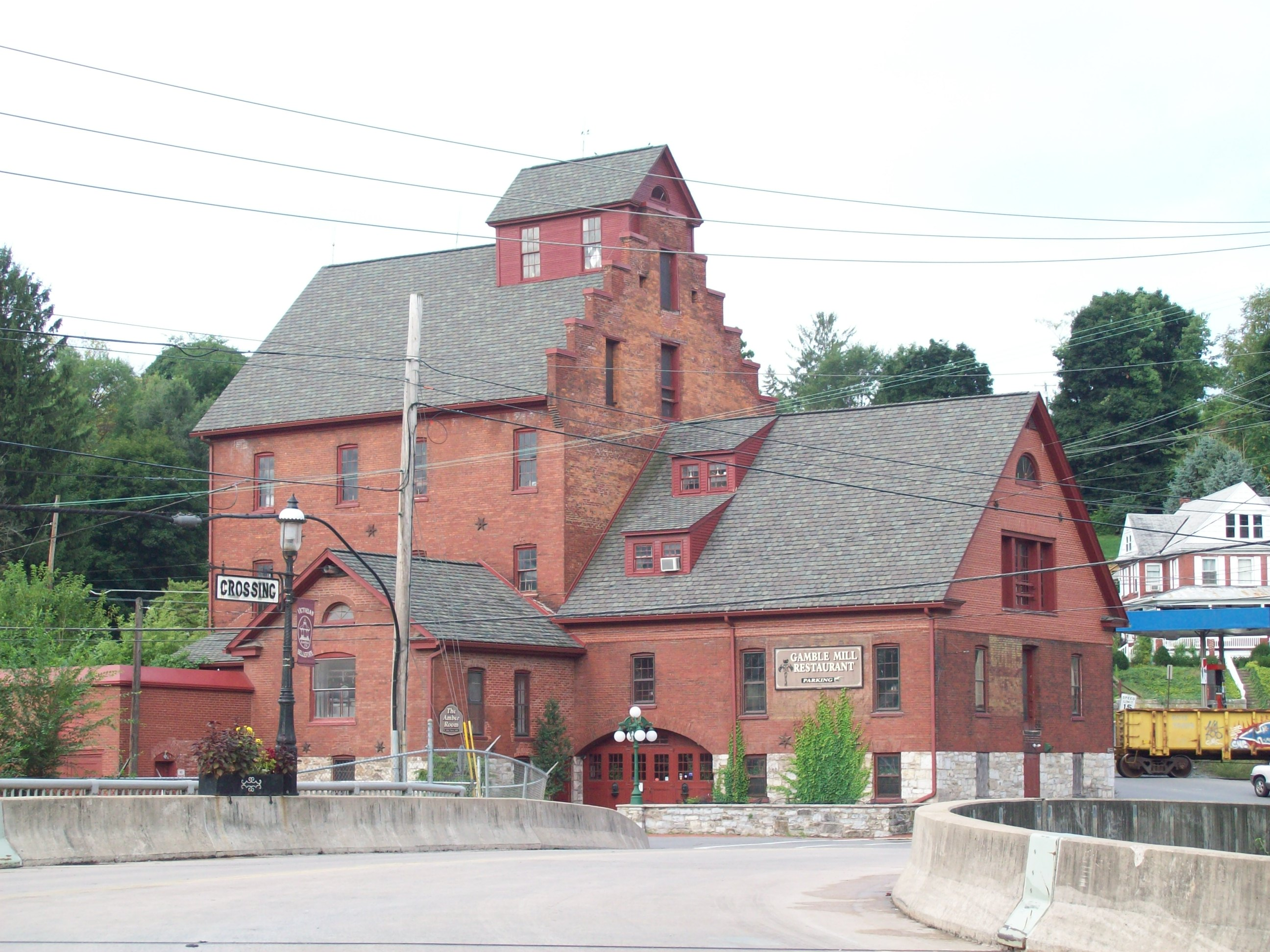
- Gamble Mill, August 2010

- Location within Pennsylvania Location within the United States
- Location: Dunlap and Lamb Sts., Bellefonte, Pennsylvania
- Coordinates: 40°54′50″N 77°47′1″W
- Area: 2 acres (0.81 ha)
- Built: 1894
- NRHP reference No.: 75001627
- Added to NRHP: August 1, 1975

Gamble Mill, also known as Lamb Mill, Thomas Mill, Wagner Mill, and Bellefonte Flouring Mill, is an historic grist mill located at Bellefonte, Centre County, Pennsylvania.

Located in the Bellefonte Historic District, it was added to the National Register of Historic Places in 1975.

== History and architectural features ==
Built in 1894, Gamble Mill is a three-and-one-half-story brick building that was erected on a limestone foundation. There have been two, one-story brick additions. This historic structure features a stepped gable, with a full gabled attic. It replaced a mill that had been built on this site in 1786, but was destroyed by fire in 1892. The mill ceased being used for grinding grain in 1947.
