= Centre County Courthouse =

- U.S. National Register of Historic Places
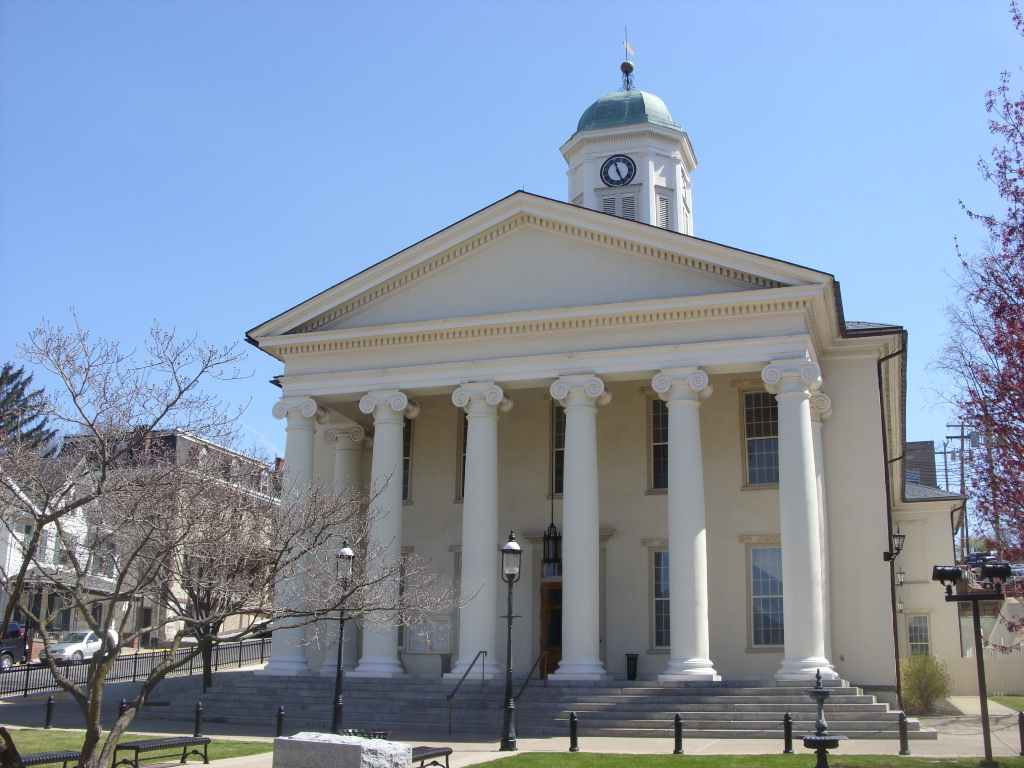
- Centre County Courthouse, April 2009

- Location within Pennsylvania Location within the United States
- Map showing the location of Centre County Courthouse
- Location: High St., Bellefonte, Pennsylvania
- Coordinates: 40°54′44″N 77°46′37″W
- Area: 0.2 acres (0.081 ha)
- Built: 1805, 1835, 1854-55, 1909, 1963-64
- Built by: George W. Tate (1854-55 extension)
- Architect: Newman & Harris (1909 extension)
- Architectural style: Greek Revival
- NRHP reference No.: 76001618
- Added to NRHP: November 7, 1976

The Centre County Courthouse is a historic courthouse located in the Bellefonte Historic District in Bellefonte, Centre County, Pennsylvania.

Located in the Bellefonte Historic District, it was added to the National Register of Historic Places in 1976.

== History and features ==
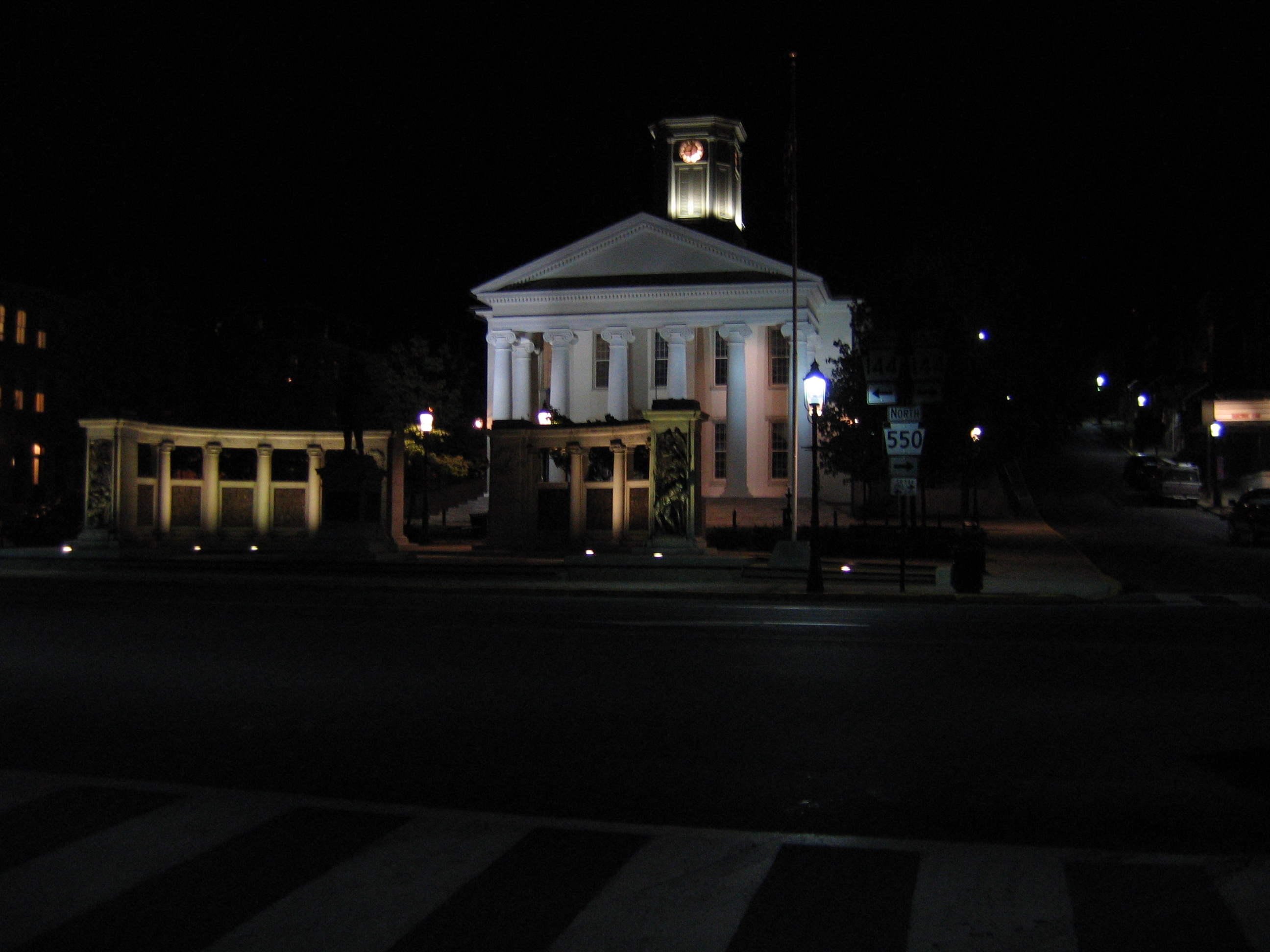
Center County Courthouse in Bellefonte, Pennsylvania, September 2006

The original section of the courthouse was built in 1805, with additions and / or remodeling in 1835, 1854–55, 1909, and 1963–64. It is a rectangular brick building on a stone foundation, measuring 135 feet long by 60 feet wide. The building is faced in stucco and has a gable roof topped by a cupola. It features a Greek Revival style entry porch with eight 26 foot high smooth faced columns with Ionic order capitals. The porch was added in 1835.

In June 2012, it was the site of the trial of Jerry Sandusky in the Penn State sex abuse scandal.

== See also ==
- List of state and county courthouses in Pennsylvania
