= Miles-Humes House =

Historic house in Pennsylvania, United States

- U.S. National Register of Historic Places
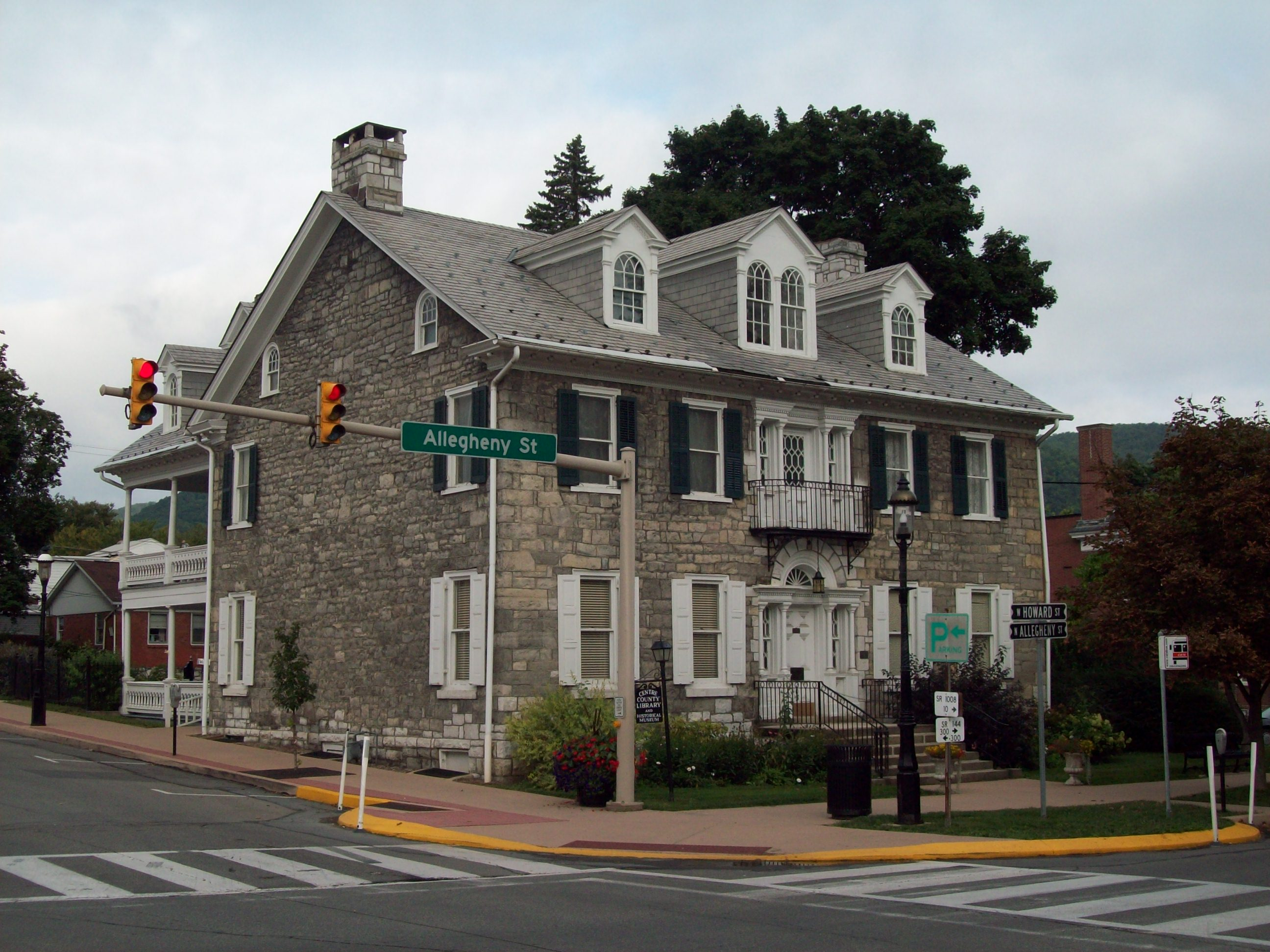
- Miles-Humes House, August 2010

- Location within Pennsylvania Location within the United States
- Location: 203 N. Allegheny St., Bellefonte, Pennsylvania
- Coordinates: 40°54′48″N 77°46′45″W
- Area: 0.7 acres (0.28 ha)
- Built: 1814-1816
- Architectural style: Georgian
- NRHP reference No.: 76001619
- Added to NRHP: October 21, 1976

Miles-Humes House, also known as the Potter Home, is a historic home located at Bellefonte, Centre County, Pennsylvania. It currently serves as the Centre County Library & Historical Museum.

== History ==
The Miles-Humes house was originally built circa 1814-1816 for Captain Joseph Miles, the co-founder of both Milesburg, Pennsylvania and the Centre Furnace Iron Works. He sold the house in 1830 to William Wilson Potter and his wife, Lucy, who continued to reside in the house after William's death in 1839. She lived in the house alone until she convinced her niece, Lucy Alexander, and nephew-in-law, Edward Humes, to move in with her.

After Edward Humes' death in 1895, his children William Potter Humes and Ann Elmira Humes took up ownership of the house and decided to renovate it. The Humes siblings remodeled the house extensively, including moving the entire house several feet from the street. The house stayed in the Humes family until Ann's death in 1934, when she donated the house for use as a public library. The house officially opened as the Centre County Library in 1939. In 1977, the main library collection moved across the street. The house continues to serve as a specialized local history and genealogical reference library known as the Pennsylvania Room on the first floor, a small local museum, and administrative offices for the library.

== Architecture ==
The Miles-Humes House is a 2 1/2-story, five bay rectangular limestone building in the Georgian style architecture. It has a low pitch, gable roof and three dormer windows. In 1896, the house was moved 12 feet from the street and elevated 4 feet off the ground in order to add on new porches to the front and side of the building. The north wing was also removed and replaced with a three-story addition to the back of the house.

It was added to the National Register of Historic Places in 1976.
