= George W. Lilley =

American academic

George W. Lilley (February 9, 1850 – June 8, 1904) was an American academic, professor of mathematics, and the first president of two American universities, today known as South Dakota State University and Washington State University.

== Early life and education ==
George W. Lilley was born February 9, 1850, in Kewanee, Henry County, Illinois, the son of William Lilley, a native of England, and Harriet Huntley Lilley, a native of Canada. Pioneers in Henry County, George's parents owned two farms including one with a substantial coal mining operation. They had six children.

George Lilley began his college studies at Knox College in Galesburg, Illinois, earning a bachelor's degree about 1873 or 1874. In 1886, Knox College also granted him an honorary degree. He continued his studies at the University of Michigan in Ann Arbor and at Illinois Wesleyan University in Bloomington, Illinois. The latter institution awarded him both Ph.D. and LL.D. degrees.

== Career ==
Lilley began his career in business in Corning, Iowa, from 1878 to 1880. In early 1884 he was selected to be the first president of Dakota Agricultural College, today South Dakota State University in Brookings. Under his leadership, the first building was constructed and enrollment grew from 35 to 252 students with varying educational preparation. While he resigned from the presidency in 1886, he is credited with laying out many ideas and plans that eventually were realized. He then served four years as professor of mathematics there.

On May 1, 1891, Lilley was appointed as the first president of the Washington Agricultural College and School of Science for a one-year term. His responsibilities included serving as director of college's agricultural experiment station. The town of Pullman in a fertile agricultural region of southeast Washington called the Palouse had just been chosen as the location for Washington's new land-grant institution, today Washington State University. Again he led a fledgling college through construction of its first small building, the hiring of five faculty members and the opening of classes. That occurred on January 12, 1892, with 59 students attending, 13 in collegiate courses and 46 in preparatory courses. Lilley himself served as professor of mathematics and elementary physics, while his brother-in-law Charles E. Munn was appointed professor of veterinary science.

He served the Washington institution through the end of 1892 when the Board of Regents chose John W. Heston as the institution's second president. Lilley is remembered as "a genial Midwesterner" who was popular with the students.

From Pullman, Lilley moved to Portland, Oregon, where he served from 1894 to 1896 as principal of the Park School, a Portland public school established in 1878. Then, in 1897, he became a professor of mathematics at the University of Oregon in Eugene, Oregon, a position he held until his death in 1904. He was the author of several books on algebra and was a contributor to American mathematical journals.

== Family ==
On June 11, 1879, in Lowell, Massachusetts, Lilley married Sophia Adelaide Munn. The daughter of William and Mary Munn, she was born in Lowell on October 11, 1856. They had one child, a son Frank Munn Lilley, who was born in Corning, Iowa, on May 3 and died on May 6, 1880.,

After her husband's death in 1904, Adelaide trained to be a librarian and served in that capacity for the Carnegie Library of Eugene, Oregon, for more than a quarter century, from the day it opened on August 20, 1906, until 1933. The 1930 Census showed her living in Eugene, a widow, 73 years old, working as the librarian for the City Library. She died on August 19, 1933, and was remembered with the Adelaide Lilley Memorial Shelf, established at the library in 1936.
