= John W. Heston =

American academic and administrator (1854–1920)

John William Heston
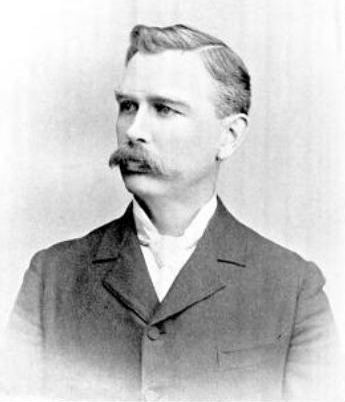
- Heston in 1901

2nd President of the Washington Agricultural College and School of Science
- In office 1892–1893
- Preceded by: George W. Lilley
- Succeeded by: Enoch Albert Bryan

3rd President of South Dakota Agricultural College
- In office 1896–1903

4th President of Madison State Normal School
- In office 1905–1920

Personal details
- Born: February 1, 1854 Bellefonte, Pennsylvania
- Died: February 1, 1920 (aged 66)
- Spouse: Mary Ellen Calder (m. 1881)
- Children: 2
- Education: Pennsylvania State University (BA, MA)
- Occupation: Academic; lawyer

John William Heston (February 1, 1854 – February 1, 1920) was an American academic who served as the second president of Washington State University, the third president of South Dakota State University, and the fourth president of Dakota State University.

== Early life and education ==
Heston was born February 1, 1854, in Bellefonte, Pennsylvania, the son of Elisha B. Heston and Catherine Eckel Heston. His father was a carriage manufacturer for many years. John Heston grew up and attended public schools in Boalsburg in the same county. Then at age 18, he studied for two years at the Centre County normal school in Centre Hall.

After teaching for one year, he enrolled at State Agricultural College of Pennsylvania at Bellefonte, which is now Pennsylvania State University. He graduated with a Bachelor of Arts degree as a member of the class of 1879, adding a Master of Arts degree in 1881. In 1879, Elisha Heston moved his family to Kansas, settling in Plainville, Kansas.

== Career ==
Soon after his graduation from present-day Pennsylvania State University, Heston joined its faculty, where he taught for 11 years. His responsibilities included serving as principal of the preparatory department for seven years, as an assistant in agriculture, and for three years as professor of the science and art of teaching. The latter appointment is described as the first professorial chair of any kind in Pennsylvania. He also studied law and was admitted to the Pennsylvania Bar as an attorney in 1890, and then moved to Seattle, Washington to practice.

In 1890, preferring education, he became the principal of the Seattle high school. He became a prominent figure in education in Washington, and spoke at the meeting of the Washington State Teachers Association in December 1891, addressing the topic "Purpose and Methods of Secondary Schools."

On December 13, 1892, the Board of Regents of the new Washington Agricultural College and School of Science, today Washington State University, selected Heston as the institution's second president, replacing George W. Lilley who had seen the school through construction of its first building on the Pullman, Washington campus and the opening of classes on January 13, 1892. Heston's tenure at Washington's land-grant institution was brief as the state legislature replaced the entire Board of Regents and the new board preferred to appoint its own president. They selected Enoch A. Bryan as the college's third president.

Heston practiced law in Seattle, for two years before assuming the presidency of the South Dakota Agricultural College, today South Dakota State University, a post he filled for seven years, 1896-1903. He is remembered for modernizing the institution, adding academic majors and minors, new degrees, and enriching the agriculture curriculum with more scientific study. In 1905 he became president of Madison State Normal School, founded in 1881 as the first teachers' college in the Dakota Territory and known today as Dakota State University. He served there until his death in 1920.

== Recognition ==
In 1894, Heston received an honorary Doctor of Laws degree from the University of Seattle, given to recognize his efforts to address the pioneer problems of the west in education. He had earlier received an LL.D. from his alma mater. Since 1971, the administration building at Dakota State University, where he served as president for 15 years, has been called Heston Hall in his honor.

== Personal life ==
On August 16, 1881, in Harrisburg, Pennsylvania, Heston married Mary Ellen Calder, the daughter of Rev. James Calder, who was president of Pennsylvania State University for 12 years, and his wife Eliza D. Calder. They had two sons, Charles Ellis Heston, an electrical engineer, and Edward Heston, a physician.
