= Pennsylvania Match Company =

- U.S. National Register of Historic Places
- Pennsylvania state historical marker
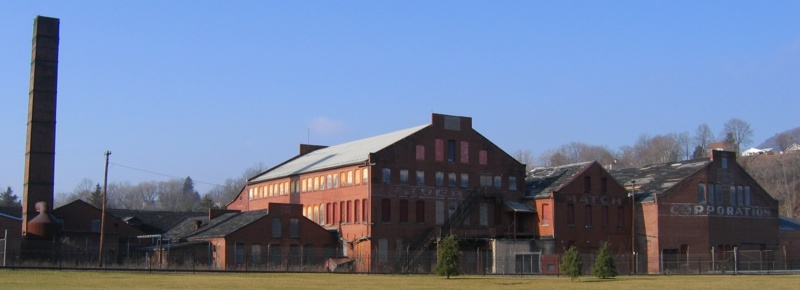
- The abandoned Match Factory prior to the APS purchase

- Location within Pennsylvania Location within the United States
- Location: 367 Phoenix Ave., Bellefonte, Pennsylvania
- Coordinates: 40°54′33″N 77°47′1″W
- Area: 5.8 acres (2.3 ha)
- Built: 1900
- Architect: Robert Cole
- NRHP reference No.: 01000954

Significant dates
- Added to NRHP: September 7, 2001
- Designated PHMC: June 26, 2004

The Pennsylvania Match Company, known locally as the Match Factory, was founded in 1899 by Col. W. Fred Reynolds, Joseph L. Montgomery and S. A. Donachy with $200,000 of their own money.

It was listed on the National Register of Historic Places in 2001.

== History and notable features ==
Mr. Donachy owned several patents for match-making machinery and worked as superintendent for the match company Hanover & York prior to their sale.

A 31,000 square feet (2,900 m^{2}) brick building was constructed in Bellefonte, Pennsylvania somewhere around late 1899 and production began in 1900, employing around or more than 300 people. By 1911, the company was one of the eight largest producers of wooden matches in the US.

At its peak during World War II, the factory employed almost 400 workers and merged with Universal Match Corporation. According to the Bellefonte Historical and Cultural Association, the business "closed in 1947 due to competition from book matches and cigarette lighters."

The red brick buildings were then purchased by lumber and building supply company M. L. Claster & Sons for their General Offices and Bellefonte storage, adding to adjacent land they already owned. After Clasters was sold to YBC in 1997, the site stood vacant for several years until the American Philatelic Society, looking for more space at lower cost, purchased the complex in 2002, renovated the largest building and relocated from State College.

The society then refurbished the adjacent structure, making space available for other commercial tenants, and stated their intention to eventually rehabilitate the remaining buildings.

== Gallery ==
Match Factory in the 1900s
