= Bellefonte Air Mail Field =

- Pennsylvania state historical marker
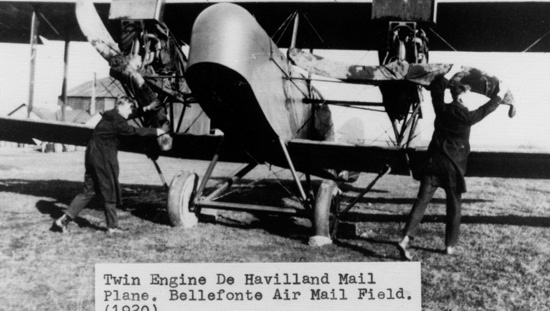
- Mail plane in Bellefonte
- Location: PA 550 (E. Bishop St.) at high school, Bellefonte
- Built: 1918
- Designated PHMC: Jun 1, 1969

The Bellefonte Air Mail Field was complete in 1918 in Bellefonte, Pennsylvania. It served as a refueling stop between New York City and Chicago on the United States airmail service. The site of the former airfield is now home to the Bellefonte Area High School.

A mural in Bellefonte commemorates the airfield's history.
