= Robert Cutietta =

Music educator and arts leader (b. 1953)

Robert Alan Cutietta (born 1953) is best known as a music educator and arts leader. He is the author or co-author of seven books and over fifty referereed research articles in the area of music psychology and education.

== Early career ==
Cutietta began his musical career performing as a bassist in the Cleveland, Ohio area. He later completed bachelor's and master's degrees in choral music education from Cleveland State University (1974 & 1978). He became the choir director at Horace Mann Middle School and Lakewood High School, both in Ohio. In 1973 he became a minister of music within the Methodist Church, a position he maintained continuously in a variety of congregations until 2003.

== Research career ==
In 1979 he left teaching to earn a doctorate in music education and psychology at Pennsylvania State University (1982). It was during this time that he began his career as a researcher and author.

He has held professorships at Montana State University, Kent State University, The University of Arizona, and The University of Southern California.

Dr. Cutietta's many books include "What Music Schools Learned from the Pandemic" [Routledge Books, 2025]" "Who Knew?! Questions you never thought to ask about Classical Music" [Oxford University Press, 2017] "Raising Musical Kids: A Parent's Guide (Oxford University Press, 2013), Encountering the Fundamentals of Music (Mayfield Publishing. 1989) and Spin-offs: The Extra-Musical Advantages of a Musical Education (UMI, 1998). He is also an author of chapters in both of the Handbooks on Music Learning and Teaching as well as author of multiple articles in the Journal of Research in Music Education, Psychology of Music, the Bulletin of the Council for Research in Music Education, Music Educators Journal, and a host of other national and international journals. He is a regular contributing author to the PBS Parent's Website.

== Composer ==
In 2003, upon moving to Los Angeles, he began composing for television and movies. His first endeavor was Lost Legends of the West, a 13-episode folk history of the American West. In 2006, he researched, composed, and orchestrated original and historic music for the documentary Welcome Back Riders.

== Positions ==
Cutietta has been a professor of Music at Montana State University, Kent State University, The University of Arizona, and The University of Southern California.

He served as Dean of the Thornton School of Music for 20 years (four terms) before stepping down in 2022. During his time as dean, he was credited with leading the creation of many innovative degrees including a Popular Music, a Redesign of how classical Music is taught, song writing, music production, and Arts Leadership. In 2012, he was asked to create the Glorya Kaufman School of Dance, the first new school at USC in 41 years and was appointed as the inaugural Dean. He held that position simultaneously with the Thornton Deanship until 2022.

From 2006 to 2016 he hosted a weekly radio segment on Classical KUSC entitled "Ask the Dean". For the 10th Anniversary of the show, he published "Who Knew: Answers to Questions about Classical Music you Never Thought to Ask" which highlighted many of the most interesting questions from the show. It was published by Oxford University Press in 2016.

He is a founding member of Montana Public Broadcasting (PBS) and the Pacific Alliance of Music Schools, and is, or has been, a member of the Advisory Board of Classical KUSC Radio in Los Angeles, The GRAMMY Awards' Blue Ribbon Adjudication Committee, The Orange County School of the Arts, The Maestro Foundation, Fender Music Foundation and the National Board of Directors at Little Kids Rock. In 2011, he was appointed Chairman of the Board of USC Fisher Museum of Art in Los Angeles. He is listed in Who's Who in America, and was designated the 2001 Alumni of the Year from the College of Arts and Architecture at Penn State University. In 2007, he received the Amicus Poloniae Award from the Government of the Republic of Poland for outstanding achievement in promoting the Arts. Cleveland State University awarded him the 2008 Alumni of the Year from the College of Arts and Letters. In 2022, he was awarded the Presidential Medallion, the highest award granted, by the University of Southern California. He was awarded the Albert Nelson Marquis Lifetime Achievement Award in 2025

In 2025 he became an Emeritus Professor and former Dean of the Thornton School of Music at The University of Southern California. He currently holds the Ong Teng Cheong Visiting Professorship at Yong Siew Toh Conservatory within the National University of Singapore. Robert Alan Cutietta is the father of Nathan Cutietta, a documentary filmmaker.

== Related Readings ==
Expanding the Definition of a Music School

Cutietta's Visionary Years in Music

Cutietta's Visionary Years in Dance
