= Anna Keichline =

American architect

Anna Wagner Keichline
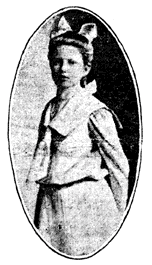
- Keichline in 1903
- Born: May 24, 1889; Bellefonte, Pennsylvania, U.S.
- Died: February 5, 1943 (aged 53)
- Education: Cornell University, Pennsylvania State College
- Occupation: Architect

Pennsylvania Historical Marker
- Designated: October 12, 2002
- Location: Bellefonte

Anna Wagner Keichline (May 24, 1889 – February 5, 1943) was an American architect, inventor, suffragist, and World War I Special Agent from Pennsylvania. She was the first woman to be registered as an architect in Pennsylvania and she was "one of the first women to actually practice architecture professionally". She was awarded seven patents, including one for a notched brick in 1927.

== Early life ==
Keichline was the youngest of four children, born in Bellefonte, Pennsylvania to attorney John Keichline. Her parents gave her a workshop and carpentry tools, which she used to create furniture. She won a prize for a table and chest she made at a county fair in 1903, when she was 14, and her work was praised as comparing "favorably with the work of a skilled mechanic". She told a newspaper reporter that she expected to devote her life to industrial design. She graduated from Bellefonte High School in 1906. She studied mechanical engineering for a year at Pennsylvania State College, the only woman in her studio class, and moved to Cornell University, graduating in 1911, their fifth female to receive an architecture degree. She played basketball at Cornell, served as class officer, and was a sorority and drama club member. Keichline was definitely aware of the disadvantage and difficulty being a woman in architecture – a male-dominated field – but she was not discouraged. She was convinced that women could be just as successful because of their innate understanding of space in a home.

== Inventions ==
She became noted for working on "time- and motion-saving" design of kitchens and interiors. She owned seven patents. She had several inventions concerning home use, but her most noted invention was the "K Brick" in 1927. This type of hollow clay brick was less heavy and expensive than previous iterations and was an early form of the concrete block used in construction decades later. This led to her receiving honors from the American Ceramic Society in 1931.

Her first patent combined a sink and a washtub. She wanted to save space in kitchens and make them more comfortable to use. In 1924 she received a patent on one of her kitchen designs. Features of Keichline's kitchen-construction patent include an oven with a fireless cooker on one side and a steam cooker on the other side, which is located behind the cooking surface. The design was focused on "comfort and convenience, efficiency, and conservation of space." This kitchen featured sloped countertops and cabinets with glass doors. In 1929 she received a patent on an apartment bed design. It could be flipped into the wall to save space.

Her most famous invention was the K Brick, which led to the development of the concrete block. It was patented in 1927 and she was honored for it by the American Ceramic Society in 1931. The K Brick was made of clay and used for hollow wall construction. It can be described as an inexpensive, light, fireproof clay brick that could be filled with insulating or sound-proofing material. Keichline noted that her K Brick, “requires less to make than brick and because of its design takes less time to fire – the tile would reduce the weight of the wall by one-half.”

== Patents ==
- Sink for Apartments (1912)
- Toy (1916)
- Components for Kitchen Construction (1926)
- K Brick (1927) Patent 1,653,771 filed March 16, 1926 and issued December 27, 1927.
- Child's Portable Partition (1927) Patent 1,647,733 filed July 14, 1924, and issued November 1, 1927
- Folding Bed for Apartments (1929)
- Air System (1931) Patent 1,838,839 filed January 28, 1927 and issued December 29, 1931
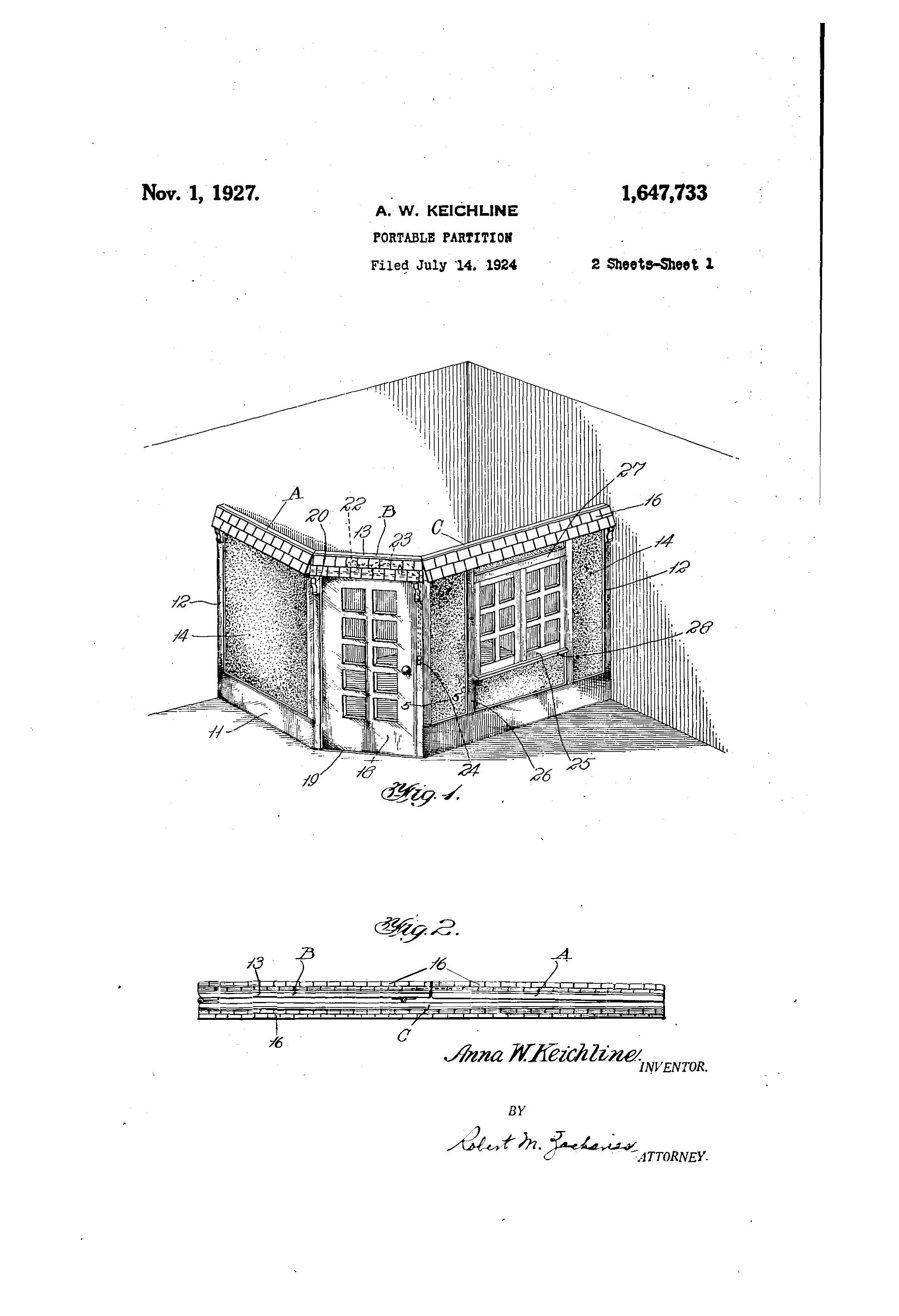
Child's Portable Partition (1927) Patent 1,647,733 filed July 14, 1924, and issued November 1, 1927

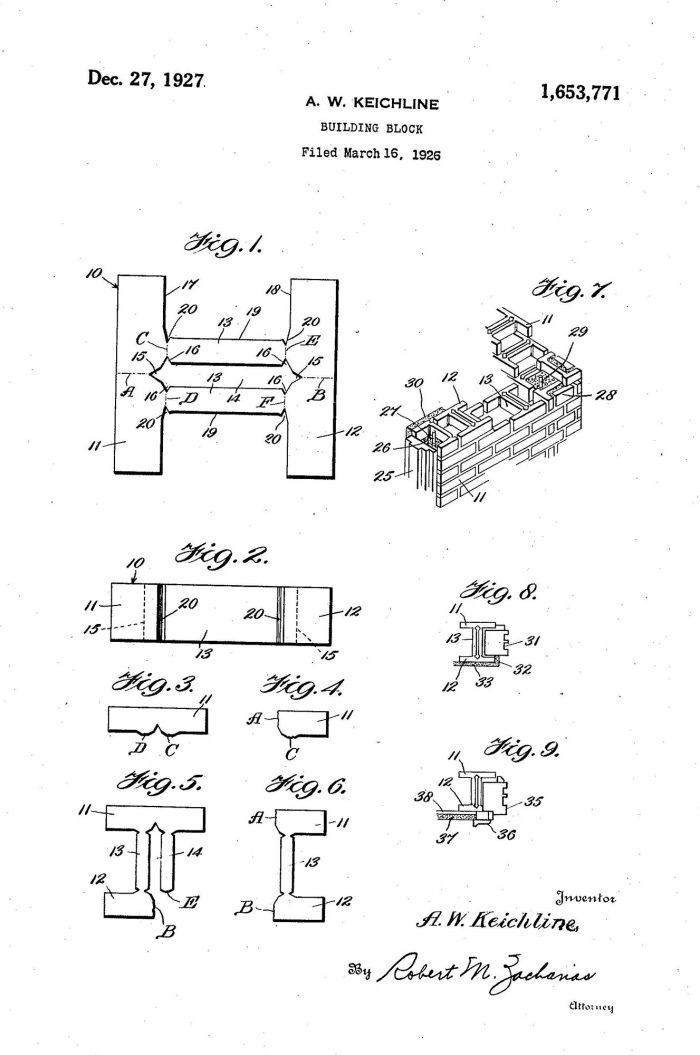
Anna Keichline, Patent for “Building Block,” #1,653,771 A, filed March 16, 1926, issued December 27, 1927

== Architecture career ==
Throughout her professional career, she designed seven patents that had great impact on day-to-day life. She also designed commercial buildings and homes in Pennsylvania, Ohio, and Washington, D.C. She was honored in 2002 with in an official state of Pennsylvania historical marker placed in front of the Plaza Theater, which she designed in 1925. Also, her great niece, Nancy Perkins carried on her legacy by establishing her own industrial design firm, Perkins Design Ltd. Keichline's designs can still be seen in Bellefonte, Mill Hall, Centre Hall, Huntingdon and Mount Union, PA.

Early in her career, Keichline taught within the Department of Home Economics at the Pennsylvania State College.

Keichline's early architectural projects "reflects a training steeped in historic precedent, drawing on past architectural forms to address modern needs."

=== Major Projects ===
==== Bald Eagle and Nittany Valley Presbyterian Church, Mill Hall, Penn., 1915 ====
This Gothic revival style church has an entry tower that is buttressed with oversized cross gables. Contemporary newspaper articles note that the kitchen used for gathering was a "unique feature" and the "exposed truss effect" of the sanctuary.

==== Cadillac Garage and Apartments (County Chevrolet Garage), Bellefonte, Penn., 1916 ====
According to the Historical Building Marker, this building originally served as a car dealership with a showroom on first floor, a repair shop on the second, and an office and living space on the third floor. Damaged by a fire in December 2009, this building was remodeled into apartments in 2016 maintaining the original look of the exterior.

==== Plaza Theater, Bellefonte, 1925 ====
The theater encompassed a stage, orchestra pit, pipe organ as well as a "Cry Room" that was enclosed in glass for parents to watch movies with young children.

==== Juniata Colony Country Clubhouse, Mount Union, Penn., 1927 ====
While the Country Club itself was designed by Tom Bendelow of Chicago, the main clubhouse was designed by Keichline. In a news articles the clubhouse was described as “30 × 45 feet in size with eighteen foot porches opening into the main club room through five pairs of French doors.”

== Personal life ==
Keichline had her own automobile, which was unusual for women at the time. She was also involved in World War I efforts, serving as a "special agent with military intelligence." She was a delegate to President Hoover's Better Housing Conference. On July 4, 1913 she led a march in Bellefonte of Suffragists during nationally organized protests.

== Publications ==
Keichline wrote the article: “Modern Wall Construction,” Clay Worker, June 1, 1932.

Keichline has been mentioned in many publications. Her career and professional practices are discussed in Goddess in the Details: product design by women, written by Erika Doering, Rachel Sivitzky, Rebecca Welz, and published by Association of Women Industrial Designers (AWID) in 1994. The book is published in conjunction with an exhibition organized by The Association of Women Industrial Designers and the Department of Exhibitions at Pratt Institute.

Keichline's achievements are also discussed in The patents of a design pioneer: Anna Wagner Keichline, written by Nancy J Perkins, published by Innovation in 1991. This publication outlined the profile of Keichline as an American pioneer industrial designer and architect; also emphasizes Keichline's four design patents awarded for multiple-use - a kitchen sink (1912), kitchen 'units' (1926), a folding bed for apartments (1929) and the 'K Brick Building Block' (1927).

== World War I Involvements ==
During World War I, Keichline served as a Special Agent in the Military Intelligence Division in Washington D.C. When talking about her qualifications for this duty she described herself as,

...twenty-eight and physically somewhat stronger than the average. Might add that I can operate and take care of a car [she owned her own automobile]. The above might suggest a drafting or office job, but if you should deem it advisable to give me something more difficult or as I wish to say more dangerous, I should much prefer it. You have asked for my salary in order to rate me. ...last year my fees amounted to something over six thousand.

Today her fees amounted to over $92,000 and she received letters from her superiors for the quality of her service.

== Legacy ==
Keichline died on February 5, 1943. A small collection of her papers, including a copy of an article written by her, "Modern Wall Construction" from the 1932 issue of The Clay-Worker, as well as designs and drawings are collected at International Archive of Women in Architecture, located at Newman Library, Virginia Tech. In 2002, Keichline's niece, Nancy Perkins, donated additional collection to IAWA, which includes a CD-ROM documenting Keichline's life and achievements.
