= McAllister-Beaver House =

Historic house in Pennsylvania, United States

- U.S. National Register of Historic Places
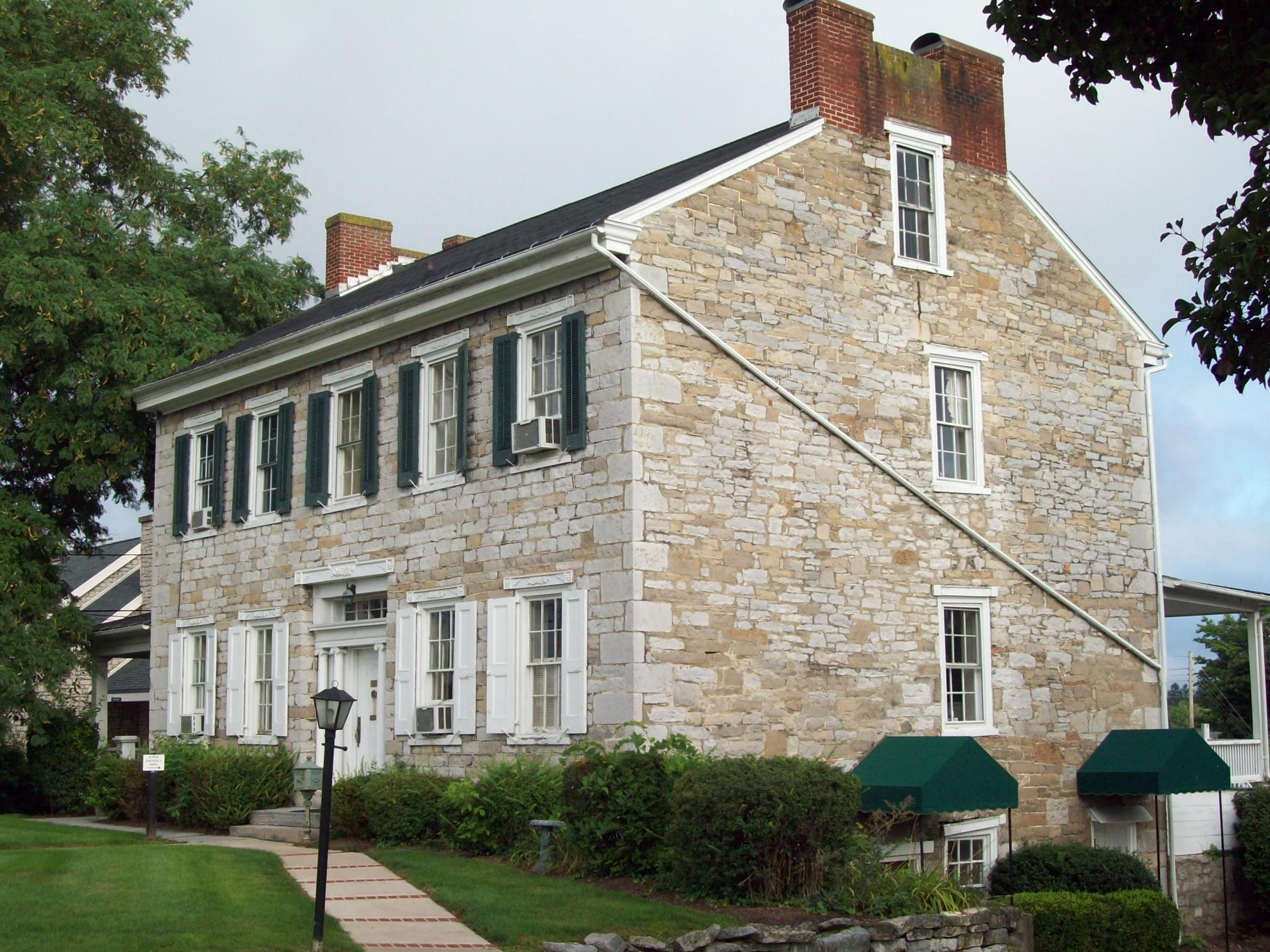
- McAllister-Beaver House, August 2010

- Location within Pennsylvania Location within the United States
- Location: 817 E. Bishop St., Bellefonte, Pennsylvania
- Coordinates: 40°54′49″N 77°45′52″W
- Area: 2.2 acres (0.89 ha)
- Built: c. 1850
- Architectural style: Greek Revival, Georgian
- NRHP reference No.: 82003774
- Added to NRHP: February 24, 1982

The McAllister-Beaver House is an historic home that is located in Bellefonte, Centre County, Pennsylvania, United States.

The house was added to the National Register of Historic Places in 1982.

== History and architectural features ==
Built circa 1850, this historic structure is a large, two-story, five-bay, rectangular, limestone building, which measures forty-two feet, four inches across and thirty-four feet, two inches, deep. Designed in the Georgian style, it has a low pitch, gable roof and a center hall plan interior. A rear kitchen ell was added in 1913. It was home to two prominent residents: Hugh N. McAllister, one of the founders of the Pennsylvania State University, and Gov. James A. Beaver.
