= Pennsylvania Route 45 =

State highway in Pennsylvania, US

Pennsylvania Route 45
- Map of central Pennsylvania with PA 45 in red and truck alternates in blue

Route information
- Maintained by PennDOT
- Length: 86 mi (138 km)

Major junctions
- West end: PA 453 in Water Street
- PA 350 near Spruce Creek PA 26 near State College; US 322 in Boalsburg; PA 144 near Centre Hall; PA 235 near Laurelton; PA 104 in Mifflinburg; PA 304 in Mifflinburg; US 15 in Lewisburg; PA 405 near Lewisburg PA 147 in Montandon
- East end: PA 642 near Mooresburg

Location
- Country: United States
- State: Pennsylvania
- Counties: Huntingdon, Centre, Union, Northumberland, Montour

Highway system
- Pennsylvania State Route System; Interstate; US; State; Scenic; Legislative
← PA 44	→ US 46
← PA 976	→ PA 978

Pennsylvania Route 45 (PA 45) is an 86-mile-long (138 km) state highway that is located in central Pennsylvania, United States. The western terminus of the route is situated at PA 453 in Morris Township near the community of Water Street. The eastern terminus is located at PA 642 west of the small town of Mooresburg.

PA 45 is also known as the Purple Heart Highway.

== Route description ==
=== Huntingdon and Centre counties ===
PA 45 begins at an intersection with PA 453 and the western terminus of PA 45 Truck in Morris Township, Huntingdon County, heading northeast on two-lane undivided Spruce Creek Road. The road passes through farmland with some homes a short distance to the west of Short Mountain.

The route crosses into Spruce Creek Township and heads into forested areas, curving northwest to run parallel to Norfolk Southern's Pittsburgh Line and the Little Juniata River which are both located northeast of the road. PA 45 turns northeast and comes to a one-lane underpass that carries the route under Norfolk Southern's Pittsburgh Line before it turns southeast and runs between the river to the northeast and the railroad tracks to the southwest as a two-lane road.

The route turns east and crosses the Little Juniata River, at which point it passes homes and some businesses in the community of Spruce Creek. The road winds north through wooded areas, with Spruce Creek parallel to the east. PA 45 curves northeast and heads through a mix of farmland and woodland with some homes parallel to the creek, with Rothrock State Forest and Tussey Mountain located a short distance to the southeast.

The route heads into Franklin Township and passes through an S-curve to the north before it heads northeast to the community of Colerain Forge, past the Colerain Forges Mansion. The road turns east and then northeast, continuing through rural land and passing through the community of Franklinville. PA 45 heads through farmland and comes to an intersection with the southern terminus of PA 350 and the eastern terminus of PA 45 Truck in the community of Seven Stars. Past this intersection, the route heads northeast through an agricultural valley between The Barrens to the northwest and Tussey Mountain to the southeast. Farther northeast, the road passes through the communities of Graysville and Pennsylvania Furnace.

PA 45 enters Ferguson Township at Baileyville in Centre County and becomes West Pine Grove Road, heading east-northeast through farmland with some development in the Nittany Valley. The road passes through the community of Rock Springs and Ramblewood as it continues through rural areas of the valley. The route reaches the community of Pine Grove Mills, where it becomes lined with homes and reaches an intersection with PA 26.

PA 45 eastbound in Harris Township

At this point, PA 26 turns east to form a concurrency with PA 45 on East Pine Grove Road. The road soon curves northeast and passes more homes along with a few businesses. The roadway leaves Pine Grove Mills and PA 45 splits from PA 26 by turning to the northeast onto Shingletown Road. The route passes through farmland with some homes at, with Tussey Mountain located southeast of the road. The road crosses into Harris Township at Shingletown and continues through rural land with some development. PA 45 passes residential neighborhoods before it comes to an intersection with US 322 Bus., where Warner Boulevard continues north to an interchange with the US 322 freeway, which also carries PA 144 Truck.

At this point, PA 45 turns east for a concurrency with US 322 Bus., and the two routes head east-southeast on four-lane divided Boal Avenue. The road passes south of the Pennsylvania Military Museum before it heads past homes and businesses in the community of Boalsburg.

PA 45 splits from US 322 Bus. by heading northeast on two-lane undivided Earlystown Road, passing near residential development. The route becomes a divided highway and comes to a partial interchange with the US 322 freeway, with a ramp to westbound US 322 and a ramp from eastbound US 322; the missing movements are provided by US 322 Bus. Past this interchange, the road becomes undivided again and heads east-northeast through a mix of farmland and housing developments, passing to the north of a golf course.

PA 45 heads into Potter Township, at which point it continues into the Penns Valley. The route heads northeast through agricultural areas with homes. Farther northeast, the road gains a center left-turn lane and passes homes and businesses before coming to an intersection with PA 144 in the community of Old Fort.

From here, PA 45 narrows to two lanes and becomes Penns Valley Pike, continuing east-northeast through farmland with some residential and commercial development. The road crosses into Gregg Township and continues east through rural land with some development in the valley as Penns Valley Road, passing north of the community of Spring Mills. The route curves northeast and runs through farm fields with some woods and development, entering Penn Township. PA 45 passes south of Penns Valley Area High School as it runs through more agricultural areas with some residences and businesses.

The road enters the borough of Millheim and becomes West Main Street, heading past homes. In the commercial downtown of Millheim, the route comes to an intersection with the southern terminus of PA 445 and becomes East Main Street. PA 45 leaves the downtown and heads into residential areas, curving to the northeast. The road leaves Millheim for Haines Township and turns to the east, passing through the residential community of Aaronsburg as Aaron's Square.

The route leaves Aaronsburg and becomes Penns Valley Road, heading east through agricultural areas with some woods and homes and passing through the community of Fiedler. PA 45 continues through rural land and passes to the north of Woodward Camp before it curves southeast and runs through the residential community of Woodward. Past Woodward, the road leaves the Penns Valley and heads east-northeast into forested areas, passing between Buffalo Mountain to the north and Thick Mountain to the south. Farther east, the route enters the Bald Eagle State Forest.

=== Union, Northumberland, and Montour counties ===
PA 45 enters Hartley Township in Union County and curves southeast as Old Turnpike Road, continuing through the Bald Eagle State Forest. The road winds southeast before it turns east and leaves the state forest, coming to an intersection with the northern terminus of PA 235. The route heads into a mix of farmland and woodland with some homes, curving to the southeast before turning back to the east. PA 45 passes through agricultural areas before it crosses into the borough of Hartleton. Here, the road becomes Main Street and is lined with homes along with a few businesses. The route leaves Hartleton for Lewis Township and becomes Old Turnpike Road again, passing through farmland with some residences and businesses. PA 45 becomes the border between West Buffalo Township to the north and Limestone Township to the south, continuing east through agricultural land with some development. The road bends to the east-northeast before it enters the borough of Mifflinburg. Here, the route becomes Chestnut Street and passes commercial development, coming to a junction with the northern terminus of PA 104. PA 45 becomes lined with homes and turns to the northeast. The road reaches the commercial downtown of Mifflinburg, where it reaches an intersection with the western terminus of PA 304. Following this, the route continues through residential areas before it heads into business areas as a three-lane road with a center left-turn lane, becoming the border between West Buffalo Township to the north and Mifflinburg to the south.

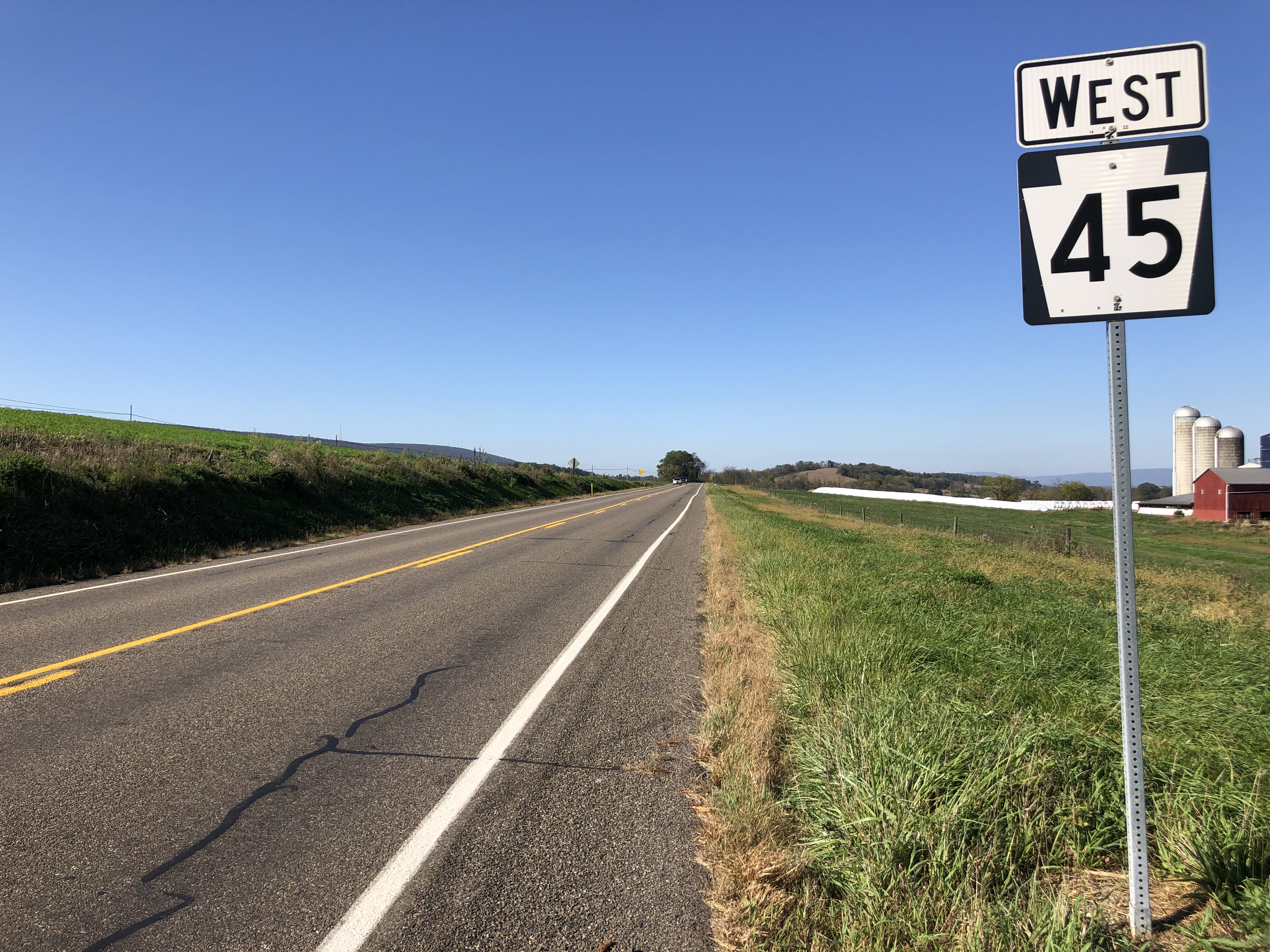
PA 45 westbound in Liberty Township, Montour County

PA 45 enters Buffalo Township, where it becomes two-lane undivided Old Turnpike Road. The road passes northeast through farmland with some residential and commercial development. The route continues through agricultural areas with some development, passing through the residential community of Vicksburg. PA 45 heads into East Buffalo Township and runs east through farm fields with some residential development, with the Buffalo Valley Rail Trail parallel to the north. The road gains a center left-turn lane and heads into a mix of homes and businesses, with the road name changing to West Market Street. The route narrows to two lanes and passes through residential areas in the community of Linntown before coming to an intersection with US 15. Upon crossing US 15, PA 45 enters the borough of Lewisburg and heads northeast past homes along Market Street. The road crosses a Union County Industrial Railroad line and continues into the commercial downtown of Lewisburg. The route passes through the downtown before it runs through residential areas and comes to a bridge over the West Branch Susquehanna River.

Upon crossing the West Branch Susquehanna River, PA 45 enters West Chillisquaque Township in Northumberland County and becomes an unnamed road, immediately coming to an intersection with PA 405 in the community of East Lewisburg. The road heads east through wooded areas before it reaches the community of Montandon, where it becomes Main Street. The route passes through residential areas with some businesses in Montandon, crossing Norfolk Southern's Buffalo Line. PA 45 leaves Montandon and comes to a diamond interchange with the PA 147 freeway. Past this interchange, the road becomes Purple Heart Highway and runs through farmland with some homes, curving to the northeast. The route turns east and crosses the Chillisquaque Creek into East Chillisquaque Township, passing through a mix of farm fields and woodland to the south of the creek. The road heads away from the creek and crosses into Liberty Township in Montour County, running through agricultural areas with some trees and residences. PA 45 turns northeast into wooded areas with some farm fields and comes to its eastern terminus at an intersection with PA 642.

== History ==
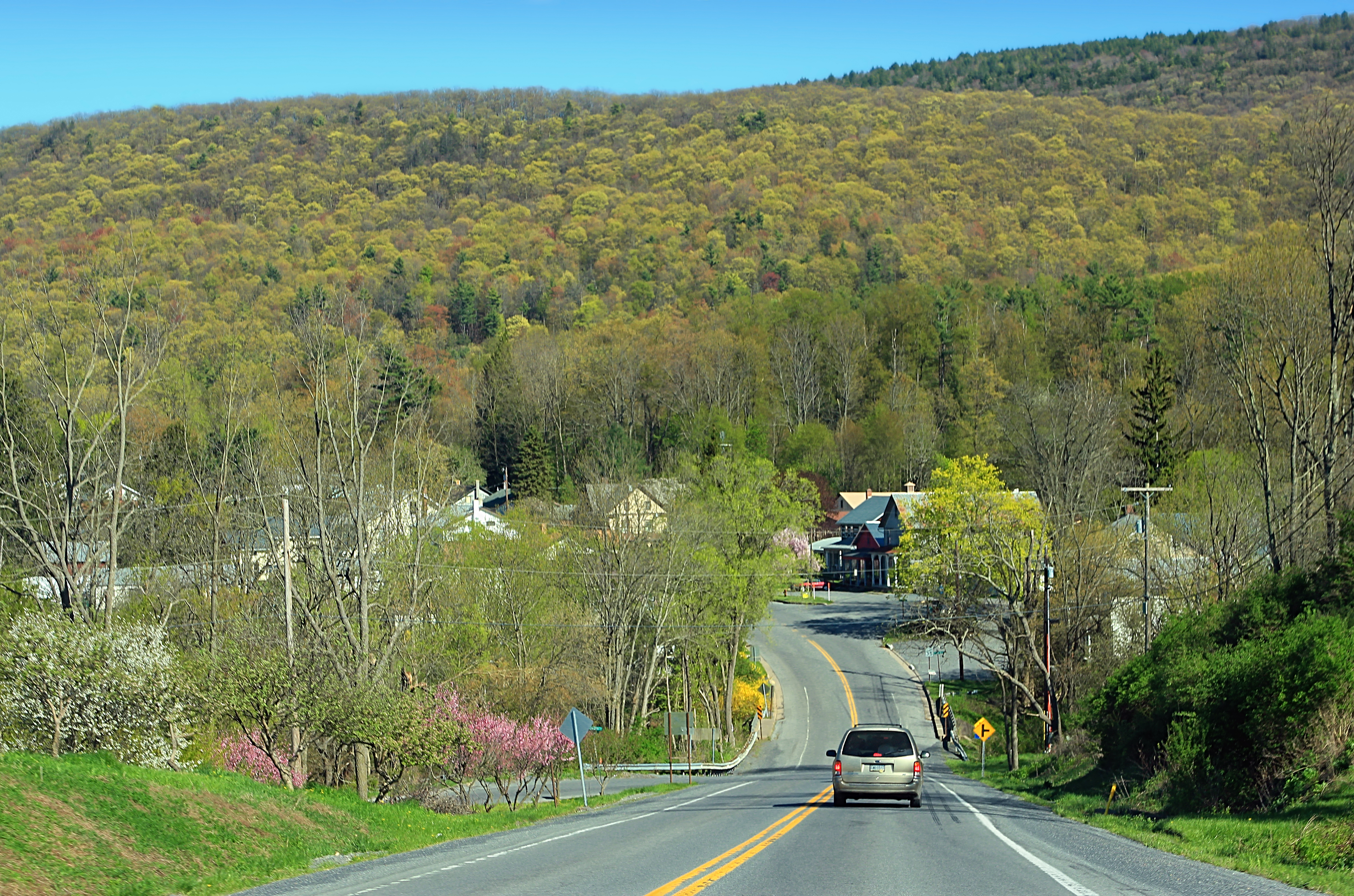
PA 45 as it heads into Woodward

From approximately 1830 to 1903, the section between Lewisburg and Mifflinburg was owned and operated by the Lewisburg and Mifflinburg Turnpike Company. The section west of Mifflinburg (formerly Youngmanstown) was built by the Bellefonte, Aaronsburg and Youngmanstown Turnpike Company, chartered in 1825.

When Pennsylvania's "traffic routes" were established in 1925, PA 45 was originally signed from Herndon to Easton. The 1928 revision expanded this route westward; PA 45 was signed on two different sections, the connection between them being signed as part of US 120 (later US 122, now PA 405, PA 147, and PA 61). The "middle" section was signed from Water Street to Montandon, between Milton and Northumberland, and the east section from Ashland to Easton.

In 1928, the route was under construction from Indianland to Beersville and completed the following year on the Ashland to Easton section. In 1930, the route was paved from Lehigh Gap to Indianland on the eastern section. In 1934, the eastern terminus was moved from Walnut Street to 13th Street in Easton.

In 1932, a western section of PA 45 was opened from Belsano to US 22 near Sankertown and Cresson. The route replaced US 422 from Belsano to Ebensburg and US 22 from Ebensburg to Cresson when those designations were placed on a straighter route. In 1936, the eastern terminus of the middle section was moved from Montandon to Mausdale. In 1946, the eastern terminus of the western section was truncated from Cresson to Ebensburg. Until 1952, the middle section entered Mooresburg on a different route. In 1951, construction began on a bypass which opened in 1952. In 1955, the eastern terminus in the eastern section was moved from 13th Street to Third Street in Easton.

Until 1961, there was a break between Mausdale and Ashland, that was connected when PA 54 was truncated to Mausdale. This resulted in PA 45 being a continuous route between Altoona and Easton. This change was undertaken as part of a plan to simplify route numbers across the state. Also in 1961, the western section of PA 45 was decommissioned; the piece of PA 45 between Belsano and Nanty Glo became part of an extension of PA 933 and is currently part of PA 271.

In 1962, the route was changed from going into State College via US 322 and then PA 26, to go straight from PA 26 to Boalsburg. On May 9, 1966, the eastern terminus of PA 45 was cut back from Easton to its current location at PA 642 in Mooresburg. The former alignment east of Mooresburg became PA 642 between Mooresburg and Mausdale, an extended PA 54 between Mausdale and Nesquehoning, solely US 209 between Nesquehoning and Weissport, and newly-designated PA 248 between Weissport and Easton. This change was made to remove several concurrencies, while the extension of PA 54 to replace PA 45 between Mausdale and Nesquehoning was made to provide a direct connection with I-80.

== Major intersections ==
County	Location	mi	km	Destinations	Notes
Huntingdon	Morris Township	0.0	0.0	PA 453 / PA 45 Truck east (Birmingham Pike) – Water Street, Tyrone	Western terminus; western terminus of PA 45 Truck
Huntingdon	Franklin Township	7.8	12.6	PA 350 north / PA 45 Truck west (Warriors Mark Path Road) – Warriors Mark	Southern terminus of PA 350; eastern terminus of PA 45 Truck
Centre	Ferguson Township	19.5	31.4	PA 26 south (South Water Street) – Huntingdon	Western terminus of concurrency
Centre	Ferguson Township	20.9	33.6	PA 26 north (West College Avenue) – State College	Eastern terminus of concurrency
Centre	Harris Township	25.1	40.4	US 322 Bus. west (South Atherton Street) – State College	Western terminus of concurrency
Centre	Harris Township	25.9	41.7	US 322 Bus. east (Boal Avenue) to US 322 east – Lewistown	Eastern terminus of concurrency
Centre	Harris Township	26.4	42.5	US 322 west / PA 144 Truck north (Mount Nittany Expressway) – Lemont, State College	Interchange; access to westbound US 322/northbound PA 144 Truck and access from eastbound US 322/southbound PA 144 Truck
Centre	Potter Township	33.3	53.6	PA 144 (Pennsylvania Avenue/Old Fort Road) – Bellefonte, Lewistown	
Centre	Millheim	44.4	71.5	PA 445 north (North Street) – Rebersburg, Lamar	Southern terminus of PA 445
Union	Hartley Township	59.1	95.1	PA 235 south – Laurelton, Beaver Springs	Northern terminus of PA 235
Union	Mifflinburg	67.4	108.5	PA 104 south / PA 304 Truck east (South 10th Street)	Northern terminus of PA 104; western terminus of PA 45 Truck/PA 304 Truck
Union	Mifflinburg	67.9	109.3	PA 304 east (South 4th Street)	Western terminus of PA 304
Union	Lewisburg	76.6	123.3	US 15 – Williamsport, Selinsgrove	
Northumberland	West Chillisquaque Township	77.5	124.7	PA 405 – Milton, Northumberland	
Northumberland	West Chillisquaque Township	79.2	127.5	PA 147 – Milton, Sunbury	Interchange
Montour	Liberty Township	86.0	138.4	PA 642 (Liberty Valley Road) – Milton, Danville	Eastern terminus
1.000 mi = 1.609 km; 1.000 km = 0.621 mi: Concurrency terminus; Incomplete access

== Special routes ==
=== PA 45 Truck (Mifflinburg) ===
Pennsylvania Route 45 Truck
- Location: Mifflinburg, Pennsylvania
- Existed: 1969–present

Pennsylvania Route 45 Truck is a 2-mile-long (3.2 km) truck route in Mifflinburg, Union County. Narrow streets within the borough are avoided by this designation, and a complicated intersection with Pennsylvania Route 304, which does not contain turning lanes, is bypassed.

The route begins at PA 304 south of Mifflinburg by heading west along SR 3004 (Red Ridge Road) before turning north onto Pennsylvania Route 104 and ending at PA 45. The truck route is signed as Pennsylvania Route 304 Truck in the opposite direction.

=== PA 45 Truck (Huntingdon County) ===
Pennsylvania Route 45 Truck
- Location: Huntingdon County, Pennsylvania
- Existed: 1969–present

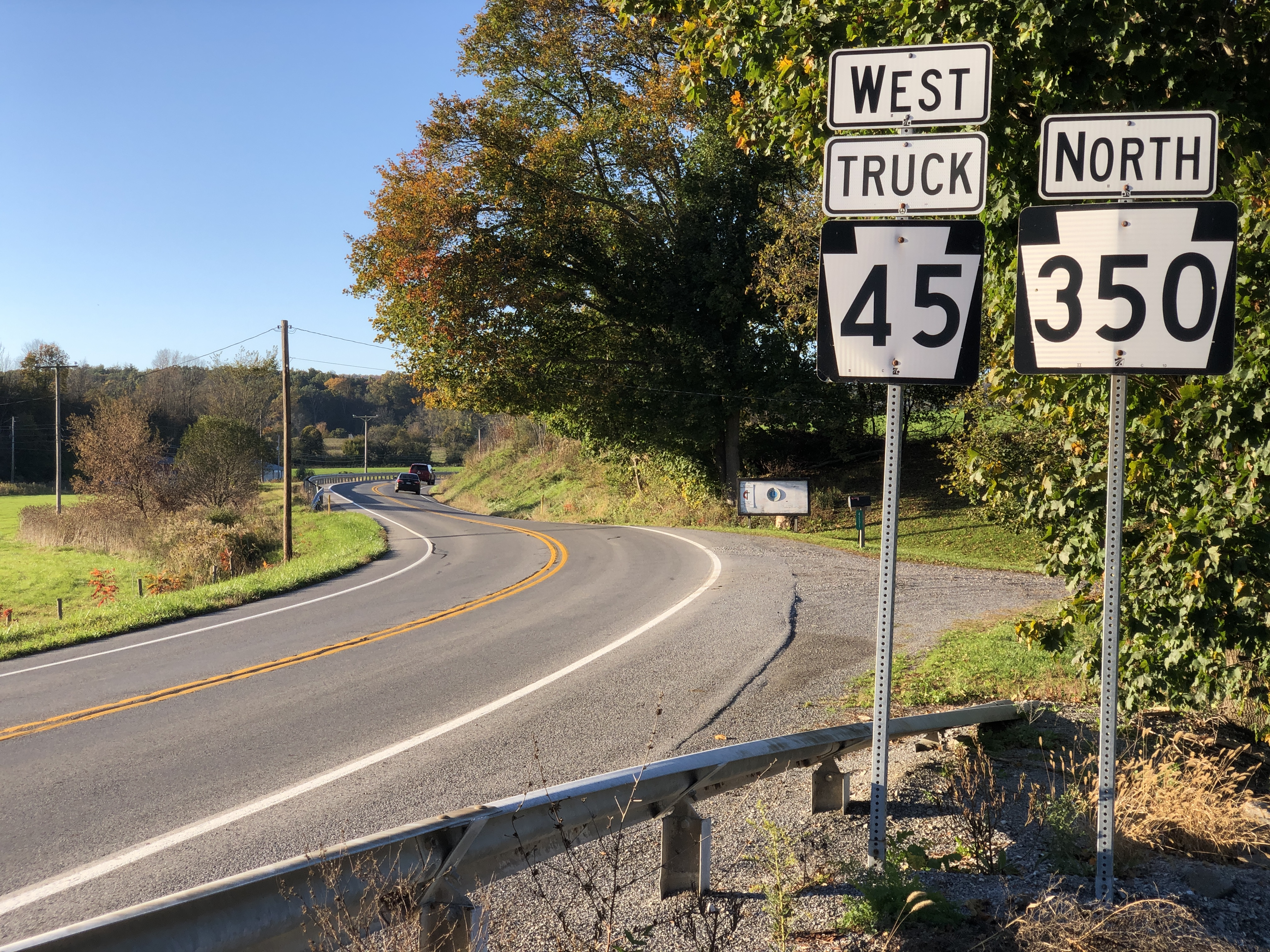
PA 45 Truck westbound concurrent with PA 350 northbound in Warriors Mark Township

At mile 2.4, just south of Spruce Creek, a very old overpass, constructed from blocks of stone, carries Norfolk Southern's Pittsburgh Line over PA 45.

Passage of large trucks is impossible as it allows only 8'2" of clearance, and the speed limit on the associated hairpin turn is 10 mph. Pennsylvania Route 45 Truck is a 17-mile-long (27 km) truck route designed to avoid this bottleneck, other sharp turns, and steep grades along mainline PA 45 in western Huntingdon County.

The route is somewhat antiquated, concurrent entirely with other routes, and significantly longer than the twisty mainline.

Traveling mostly in Franklin Township and Warriors Mark Township, the route begins in the west by branching northbound along Pennsylvania Route 453, before continuing east along Pennsylvania Route 550, and traveling south along Pennsylvania Route 350 to meet up with its parent.

=== PA 45 Truck (Centre County) ===
Pennsylvania Route 45 Truck
- Location: Centre County, Pennsylvania
- Existed: 2013–2018

Pennsylvania Route 45 Truck was a truck route of PA 45 that bypassed a weight-restricted bridge over Pine Creek on which trucks over 33 tons and combination loads over 40 tons were prohibited.

The route follows PA 144, PA 192, and PA 445.

It was signed in 2013, but as recently as 2018, the route was not signed, and the bridge had its weight restrictions removed by 2021.
