= Pennsylvania Route 550 =

State highway in Pennsylvania, US

Pennsylvania Route 550

Route information
- Maintained by PennDOT
- Length: 36.4 mi (58.6 km)

Major junctions
- South end: PA 453 / PA 45 Truck in Snyder Township
- PA 350 in Warriors Mark Township; PA 150 in Bellefonte; PA 144 in Bellefonte; I-99 / US 220 / PA 26 in Spring Township
- North end: PA 64 in Zion

Location
- Country: United States
- State: Pennsylvania
- Counties: Blair, Huntingdon, Centre

Highway system
- Pennsylvania State Route System; Interstate; US; State; Scenic; Legislative
← PA 549	→ PA 551

Pennsylvania Route 550 (PA 550) is a 36 mile (58 km) long state highway in Pennsylvania. The southern terminus of the route is at PA 453 and PA 45 Truck east of Tyrone. The northern terminus is at PA 64 in Zion. The road is known as Pennington Road, Halfmoon Valley Road, Centre Line Road, Buffalo Run Road, Water Street, High Street, Bishop Street, and Zion Road.

== Route description ==
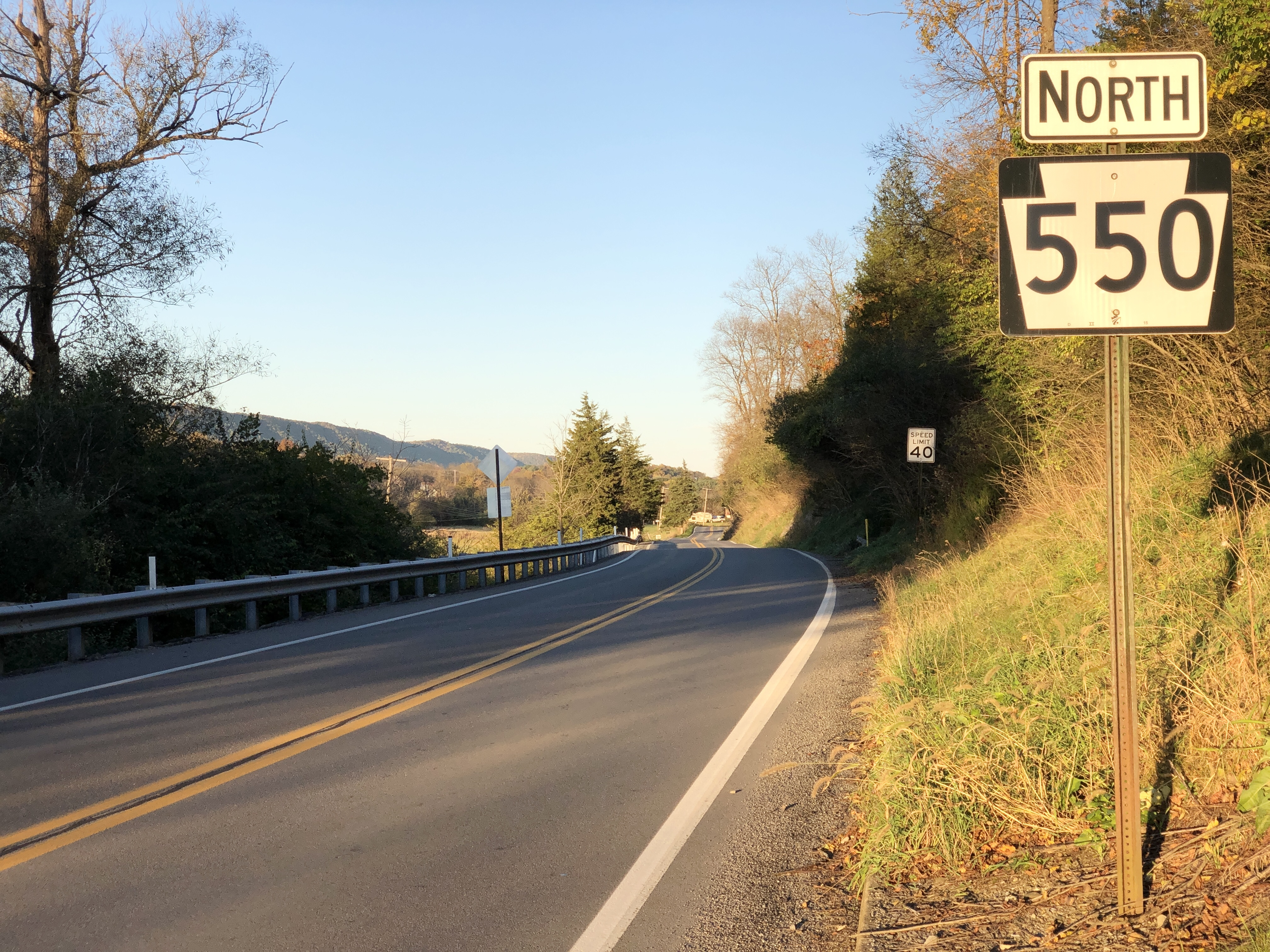
PA 550 northbound in Benner Township

PA 550 begins at an intersection with PA 453 and PA 45 Truck in Snyder Township, Blair County, heading northeast on a two-lane undivided road concurrent with PA 45 Truck. The route passes through forested areas to the southeast of Bald Eagle Mountain, heading past the residential community of Nealmont. The road heads into Warriors Mark Township in Huntingdon County and becomes Pennington Road, running through wooded areas with some fields and development and passing through Stover. PA 550/PA 45 Truck continues through agricultural areas with occasional trees and residences before running through more woodland with some homes. The road heads through a mix of farmland and woods as it comes to the residential community of Warriors Mark, intersecting PA 350. At this intersection, PA 45 Truck turns to the southeast to join PA 350 and PA 550 becomes Centre Lane, heading into more agricultural areas with some trees and homes. The route turns to the northwest before making a turn to the northeast onto Halfmoon Valley Road, continuing through more rural areas.

PA 550 enters Halfmoon Township in Centre County and continues northeast through an agricultural valley with some residences. The road passes through farmland with a few woods and some residential subdivisions as it heads through the communities of Centennial and Stormstown. The route heads into Patton Township and becomes Buffalo Run Road, passing through a mix of farmland and housing developments before heading into wooded areas. In Buffalo Run, PA 550 turns to the east and intersects Atherton Street before passing under I-99/US 220/US 322. The road continues through a mix of agricultural and wooded areas with homes, heading through Waddle. Farther northeast, the route runs through more rural areas, passing through the community of Briarly. Upon reaching Fillmore 550 crosses into Benner Township and runs through more farm fields with occasional areas of residences. The road passes to the north of Bellefonte Airport before heading past housing developments and running through woods, crossing Spring Creek.

The route heads into Spring Township and becomes West Water Street, passing homes in the community of Bush Addition and turning east. PA 550 intersects PA 150 and turns northeast to join that route on Willowbank Street, heading into the borough of Bellefonte. The road becomes South Water Street and passes residences and a few businesses, crossing a Nittany and Bald Eagle Railroad line and curving to the north. PA 550 splits from PA 150 by turning east onto West High Street and passing through the commercial downtown. The route intersects PA 144 west of the Centre County Courthouse and turns south to follow that route along South Allegheny Street. PA 550 splits from PA 144 by turning east onto East Bishop Street, where it is lined with several homes. Farther east, the road gains a center left-turn lane and heads into commercial areas. The route becomes two lanes again and the name changes to Zion Road as it passes homes and businesses, crossing back into Spring Township. PA 550 becomes a divided highway as it reaches an interchange with I-99/US 220/PA 26. Past this, the road heads through areas of farmland with some residential and commercial development. The route continues through open agricultural areas with some areas of housing developments, entering Walker Township. Here, PA 550 passes through Zion and curves northeast, coming to its northern terminus at PA 64.

== History ==
PA 550 was signed in 1928 and in 1929-1930, the route was constructed from PA 45 to Stiver Road.

== Major intersections ==
County	Location	mi	km	Destinations	Notes
Blair	Snyder Township	0.0	0.0	PA 453 / PA 45 Truck west (Birmingham Pike) – Water Street, Tyrone	Southern terminus; western terminus of overlap with PA 45 Truck
Huntingdon	Warriors Mark Township	5.8	9.3	PA 350 / PA 45 Truck east (Warriors Mark Path Road) – Bald Eagle, Seven Stars	Eastern terminus of overlap with PA 45 Truck
Centre	Spring Township	30.2	48.6	PA 150 south (Willowbank Street) – State College	Western terminus of PA 150 overlap
Centre	Bellefonte	30.7	49.4	PA 150 north (North Water Street) – Milesburg, Lock Haven	Eastern terminus of PA 150 overlap
Centre	Bellefonte	30.9	49.7	PA 144 north (North Allegheny Street)	Northern terminus of PA 144 overlap
Centre	Bellefonte	31.0	49.9	PA 144 south (West Bishop Street)	Southern terminus of PA 144 overlap
Centre	Spring Township	32.9	52.9	I-99 / US 220 / PA 26 to I-80 – State College, Howard	I-99/US 220/PA 26 exit 83
Centre	Walker Township	36.3	58.4	PA 64 (East College Avenue/Nittany Valley Drive) to I-80 – Lock Haven, State College	Northern terminus
1.000 mi = 1.609 km; 1.000 km = 0.621 mi: Concurrency terminus
