= Pennsylvania Route 350 =

State highway in Pennsylvania, US

Pennsylvania Route 350

Route information
- Maintained by PennDOT
- Length: 21.961 mi (35.343 km)

Major junctions
- South end: PA 45 in Franklin Township
- PA 550 in Warriors Mark; I-99 / US 220 in Bald Eagle
- North end: PA 53 / PA 504 in Philipsburg

Location
- Country: United States
- State: Pennsylvania
- Counties: Huntingdon, Blair, Centre

Highway system
- Pennsylvania State Route System; Interstate; US; State; Scenic; Legislative
← PA 349	→ PA 351

Pennsylvania Route 350 (PA 350) is a 22-mile-long (35 km) state highway located in Huntingdon, Blair, and Centre counties in Pennsylvania. The southern terminus is at PA 45 in Franklin Township. The northern terminus is at PA 53/PA 504 in Philipsburg.

== Route description ==
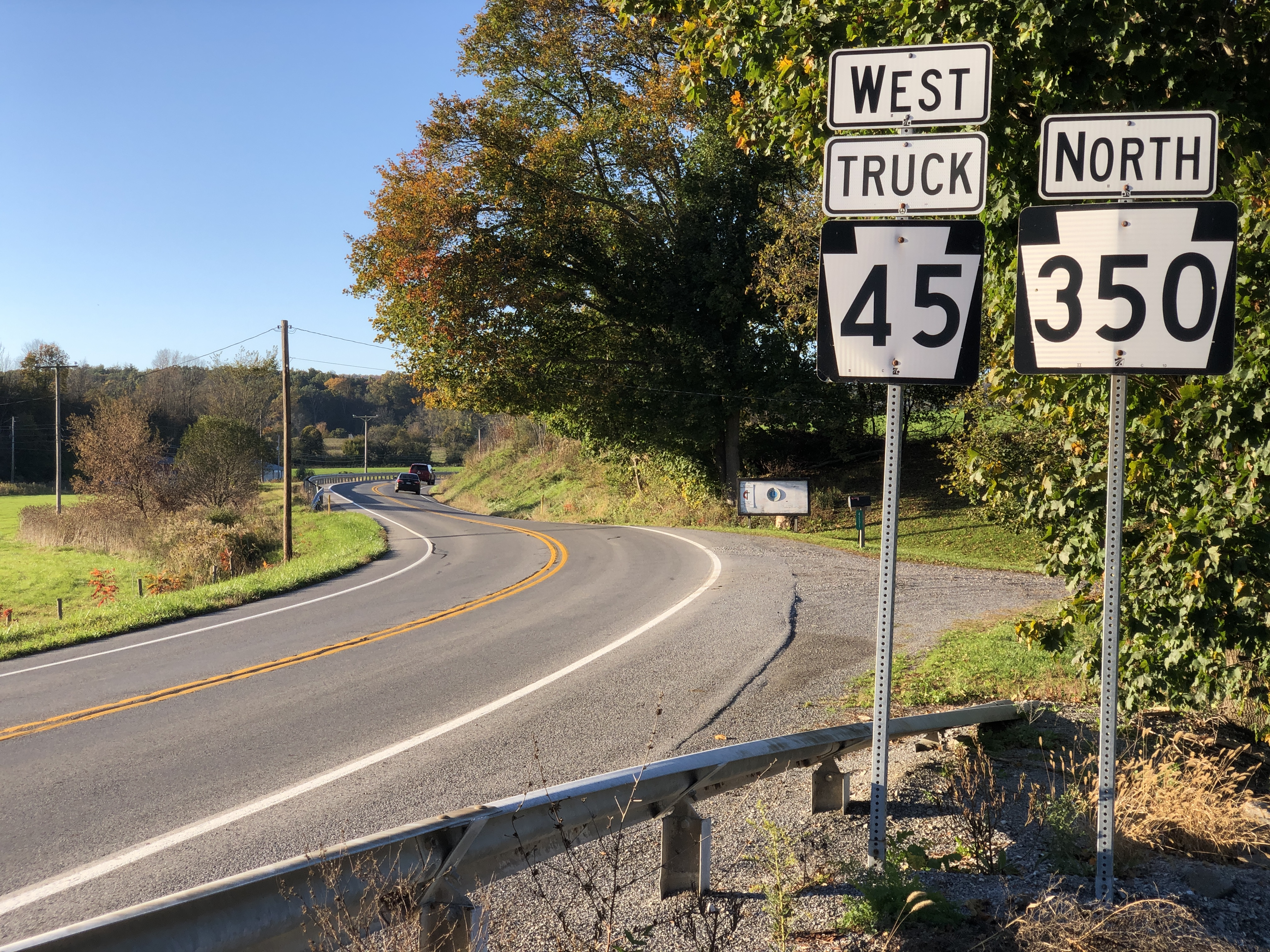
PA 350 northbound in Warriors Mark Township

PA 350 begins at an intersection with PA 45 in the community of Seven Stars in Franklin Township, Huntingdon County, heading northwest on two-lane undivided Warriors Mark Path Road concurrent with PA 45 Truck. The road heads through open agricultural areas, passing through Graziers Mill. The route continues into Warriors Mark Township and runs through more farmland with occasional woods and homes, coming to the residential community of Warriors Mark. Here, PA 350 intersects PA 550, with PA 45 Truck turning southwest to follow PA 550. The route continues through more agricultural areas before coming to the community of Spring Mount, where it turns west to ascend forested Bald Eagle Mountain.

At the summit of the mountain, PA 350 enters Snyder Township in Blair County and becomes Seven Stars Road, descending the mountain. The road passes under Interstate 99 (I-99) and U.S. Route 220 (US 220) and comes to a bridge over a Nittany and Bald Eagle Railroad line before passing a few farm fields and coming to a ramp that provides access to I-99/US 220. At this point, the route turns north onto an unnamed four-lane divided highway, passing through woods and coming to an intersection with US 220 Business in the community of Bald Eagle. PA 350 passes through wooded areas with some homes from this point.

PA 350 heads into Taylor Township in Centre County and becomes Old Tyrone Pike, turning northwest and running through more forests. The road enters Rush Township and turns to the north as South Centre Street, heading north through more rural areas and passing through Summit. The route heads north through forests with occasional development for several miles. PA 350 heads into a mix of fields and woods with some residences, becoming the border between Rush Township to the west and the borough of Philipsburg to the east. The road turns northwest into residential areas and fully enters Philipsburg. PA 350 splits into a one-way pair as it comes to the square in the center of town, ending at PA 53 and PA 504. Past the square, the road continues north as part of PA 53.

== Major intersections ==
County	Location	mi	km	Destinations	Notes
Huntingdon	Franklin Township	0.000	0.000	PA 45 (Spruce Creek Road) / PA 45 Truck begins – Spruce Creek, Water Street, State College	Southern terminus; south end of PA 45 Truck overlap
Huntingdon	Warriors Mark Township	4.327	6.964	PA 550 / PA 45 Truck west (Pennington Road / Centre Line Road)	North end of PA 45 Truck overlap
Blair	Snyder Township	7.921	12.748	I-99 / US 220 – Tyrone, Port Matilda	I-99/US 220 exit 52; access via SR 4041
Blair	Snyder Township	8.148	13.113	US 220 Bus. south / SR 4027 (Bald Eagle Valley Road) – Port Matilda, State College	Northern terminus of US 220 Bus.
Centre	Philipsburg	21.961	35.343	PA 53 / PA 504 east (Presqueisle Street/North Centre Street) to US 322 / I-80 – Clearfield, State College	Northern terminus; western terminus of PA 504
1.000 mi = 1.609 km; 1.000 km = 0.621 mi: Concurrency terminus
