= Wallace Run (Bald Eagle Creek tributary) =

Watercourse in Pennsylvania, US

Coordinates: 40°55′51″N 77°49′01″W

Wallace Run is a tributary of Bald Eagle Creek in Centre County, Pennsylvania, in the United States. It is 12.1 miles (19.5 km) long and is a low-alkalinity stream. The stream flows through Union Township and Boggs Township in Centre County. Most of the watershed is in Boggs Township. The North Branch of Wallace Run is one tributary of the stream. The watershed has an area of 24 square miles (62 km^{2}). Oaks, maples, ash trees, birches, hemlocks, and rhododendrons all exist in the upper reaches of the stream, which is mostly forested. The lower reaches of the stream are mostly developed.

== Course ==
Wallace Run begins in a valley in the Pennsylvania State Game Lands Number 163 in western Union Township. The headwaters are situated on the southern side of the Allegheny Plateau. Foxy Hollow is to the south of the headwaters and Bear Knob is to the east. The stream flows northeast past Dry Hollow and picks up Rock Cabin Run on the left. The stream continues northeast, passing Grindstone Gap on the right and picking up Birch Lick Run on the left. After this, the creek flows around Ganderstep Knob, picking up its north branch. It turns southeast and exits the township. Wallace Run then enters Boggs Township and its valley becomes shallower. The stream passes Gum Stump and begins to parallel Pennsylvania Route 144 for several miles to its mouth, passing the community of Runville along the way. Wallace Run enters Bald Eagle Creek at the community of Wingate, a short distance upstream of Milesburg.

=== Tributaries ===
Wallace Run's North Branch begins near the edge of Boggs Township, just south of Pennsylvania Route 144. It flows southwest a short distance into Union Township, where it joins the main stem.

== Hydrology ==
The concentration of alkalinity in Wallace Run near its source is 10 parts per million. Near its mouth, the concentration is 28 parts per million.

At an unnamed tributary of Wallace Run downstream of Gum Stump, the pH was measured in 2008 to be 7.9 and 8.0 and the conductivity was 387 and 390 micro-siemens. In August 2008, the water temperature was 68 feet (21 m) in the lower reaches of the creek and 63 feet (19 m) two miles (three kilometers) upstream.

In 2009, before a storm, the size of particles in Wallace Run was measured. 10% had a diameter of less than one millimeter, about one third had a diameter of less than one centimeter, and over 90% had a diameter of less than ten centimeters. After a storm, a very small percentage of particles had a diameter of less than one millimeter. Slightly under 10% of the particles had a diameter of less than one centimeter. 80% to 90% of the particles had a diameter of less than ten centimeters.

The Manning formula values on Wallace Run were 0.039 on July 31 and August 1, 2009 and 0.046 on October 24, 2009.

== Geology and geography ==
Wallace Run is a coldwater freestone stream. In the upper eight miles, the main rock types are sandstone, red and brown shale, and gray conglomerate. The elevation of the creek at its headwaters is 2,240 feet (680 m). For the first 6.1 miles (9.8 km), the stream's elevation decreases at a rate of 184 feet (56 m) per mile, reaching an elevation of 1,112 feet (339 m). For the next 2.1 miles (3.4 km), the elevation falls at a rate of 73 feet (22 m) per mile, to 958 feet (292 m). From this point to the mouth, the elevation decreases at a rate of 58 feet (18 m) per mile. The mouth is at an elevation of 726 feet (221 m). The elevation of the entire Wallace Run watershed ranges from 211 metres (692 ft) to 758 metres (2,487 ft).

Ice caves and other ice formations have been observed to form on Wallace Run in the wintertime.

Wallace Run has experienced damaging floods in the past. Past attempts to remedy this mainly focused on straightening the stream and lining it with rocks, increasing the velocity of the water. Landowners, as well as the area's governments, have attempted to add riprap and levees to the stream to improve its quality. Although initially these attempts were unsuccessful, the stream quality has improved.

3.2 kilometres (2.0 mi) upstream of Wallace Run's mouth, the stream is 12 metres (39 ft) in bankfull width and 0.55 metres (1.8 ft) in bankfull depth. The actual depth, as measured in 2009, was 0.37 metres (1.2 ft). The discharge of the stream was measured to be 5.3 cubic meters per second on July 31 and August 1, 2009 and 4.5 cubic meters per second on October 24, 2009. The velocity of the stream on these dates was 1.28 meters per second and 1.09 meters per second, respectively.

The Bear Rocks are a geological formation located on a hill northeast of Wallace Run. They are square blocks of sandstone that are "nearly as big as houses". The Wallace Run valley is 900 feet (270 m) high in the upper reaches of the stream.

== Watershed ==
The area of the Wallace Run watershed is 24 square miles (62 km^{2}). The upper part of the watershed is mostly forested with some cabins, while the lower part is mostly suburban, with some agricultural land. The watershed is mostly located within Boggs Township.

== History ==
In the 1800s, there was a sabbath school on Wallace Run. A narrow-gauge railroad once went through the creek's valley, but only traces of the grade remain in the 21st century. The Pennsylvania Fish and Boat Commission has done measurements of the fish and macroinvertebrate populations in Wallace Run since the 1930s. In the 1930s, the Civilian Conservation Corps constructed a fire road on Ganderstep Knob and stairs leading from it down to the stream, where there was a swimming hole. The swimming hole no longer existed as of January 2008. Three gas wells are located in the watershed, but only one is unplugged. A 1,000-foot (300 m) stretch of the stream was restored by the Wildlife for Everyone Foundation in 2010.

== Biology ==
Near the headwaters, the main plants forming the canopy are hemlock and rhododendron. Further downstream, but still in the first half of its course, the main trees are ash (particularly white ash and green ash), chestnut oaks, red oaks, red maples, tulips, yellow birches, and hemlocks. There are no riparian buffers in the lower reaches of the stream; there are often lawns instead. Wallace Run is an approved trout stream (Class A Wild Trout Waters) by the Pennsylvania Fish and Boat Commission. Both brook trout and brown trout live in the stream.

== Recreation ==
Opportunities for recreation on Wallace Run include canoeing, kayaking, birdwatching, and fishing.

== See also ==
- List of rivers of Pennsylvania
- Spring Creek (Bald Eagle Creek tributary)
