= Runville, Pennsylvania =

Unincorporated community in Pennsylvania, US

- Census-designated place
- Location within Pennsylvania Location within the United States
- Coordinates: 40°57′51″N 77°50′24″W
- Country: United States
- State: Pennsylvania
- County: Centre
- Township: Boggs

Area
  - Total: 0.56 sq mi (1.44 km^{2})
  - Land: 0.56 sq mi (1.44 km^{2})
  - Water: 0 sq mi (0.00 km^{2})
- Elevation: 881 ft (269 m)

Population (2020)
  - Total: 299
  - Density: 537.8/sq mi (207.64/km^{2})
- Time zone: UTC-5 (Eastern (EST))
  - Summer (DST): UTC-4 (EDT)
- ZIP Code: 16823 (Bellefonte)
- Area codes: 814/582
- FIPS code: 42-66688
- GNIS feature ID: 2805556

Runville is an unincorporated community and census-designated place (CDP) in Centre County, Pennsylvania, United States. It was first listed as a CDP prior to the 2020 census.

The CDP is in north-central Centre County, in the western part of Boggs Township. It sits in the valley of Wallace Run, a southward-flowing tributary of Bald Eagle Creek, part of the West Branch Susquehanna River watershed. Pennsylvania Route 144 is the main road through the community; it leads south and east 4 miles (6 km) to Milesburg and northwest up the Allegheny Front 9 miles (14 km) to Snow Shoe.

== Demographics ==
Historical population
Census	Pop.	Note	%±
2020	299		—
U.S. Decennial Census
