= Pennsylvania Route 504 =

State highway in Centre County, Pennsylvania, US

Pennsylvania Route 504

Route information
- Maintained by PennDOT
- Length: 24.540 mi (39.493 km)

Major junctions
- West end: PA 53 / PA 350 in Philipsburg
- US 322 in Philipsburg; US 220 Alt. in Unionville
- East end: US 220 Alt. / PA 144 in Wingate

Location
- Country: United States
- State: Pennsylvania
- Counties: Centre

Highway system
- Pennsylvania State Route System; Interstate; US; State; Scenic; Legislative
← PA 503	→ PA 505

Pennsylvania Route 504 (PA 504) is a 24.5-mile-long (39.4 km) state highway located in Centre County in the U.S. state of Pennsylvania. The western terminus is at PA 53/PA 350 in Philipsburg. The eastern terminus is at US 220 Alternate/PA 144 in Wingate.

It roughly follows a portion of the path of the historic 1799 State Road from "Bald Eagle's Nest" (Milesburg) to Fort Le Boeuf (Waterford, PA), which was laid out and cleared under contract with the Pennsylvania Assembly and opened for travel by 1802. The State Road was an important thoroughfare during the War of 1812, and was for many years the primary route for mail, goods and travelers between Philadelphia and Erie. Many of the original, 19th-century stone mileposts are preserved along the northern side of the highway.

== Route description ==
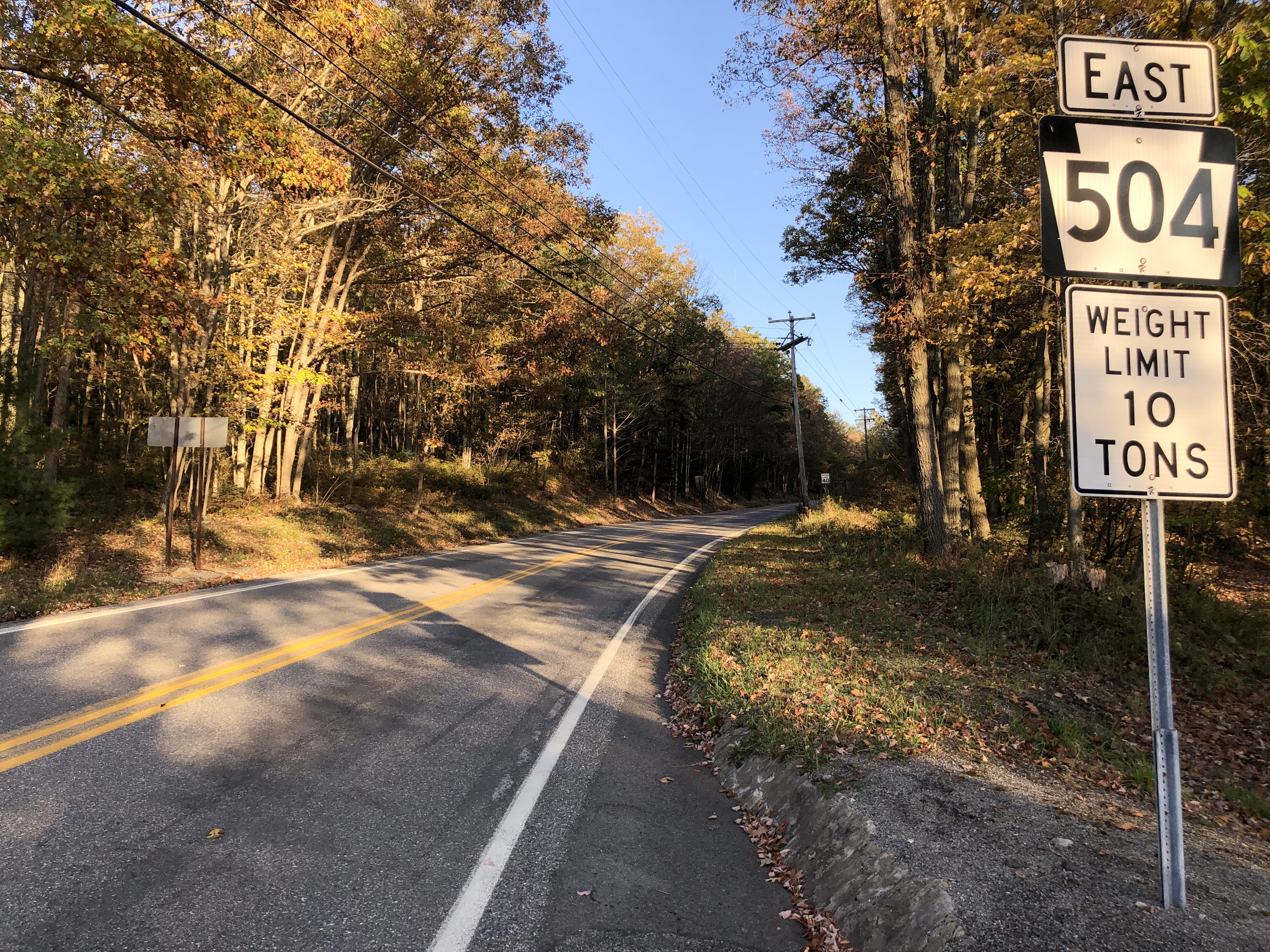
PA 504 eastbound in Black Moshannon State Park

PA 504 begins at an intersection with PA 53 and PA 350 at the square in the center of the borough of Philipsburg, heading east-northeast on two-lane undivided East Presqueisle Street. West of the square, the road continues as a part of PA 53. The route passes through residential areas, passing woods to the south as it forms the border between Philipsburg to the north and Rush Township to the south. PA 504 fully enters Philipsburg again and passes more homes before coming to an intersection with US 322. Following this, the road heads into Rush Township and becomes Black Moshannon Road, curving east through rural residential areas. The route passes through a mix of farmland and woodland prior to entering Moshannon State Forest. PA 504 continues into Black Moshannon State Park, where it passes over Black Moshannon Creek and runs through the former community of Antes. Once leaving the park, the road becomes Rattlesnake Pike and continues through more of the Moshannon State Forest.

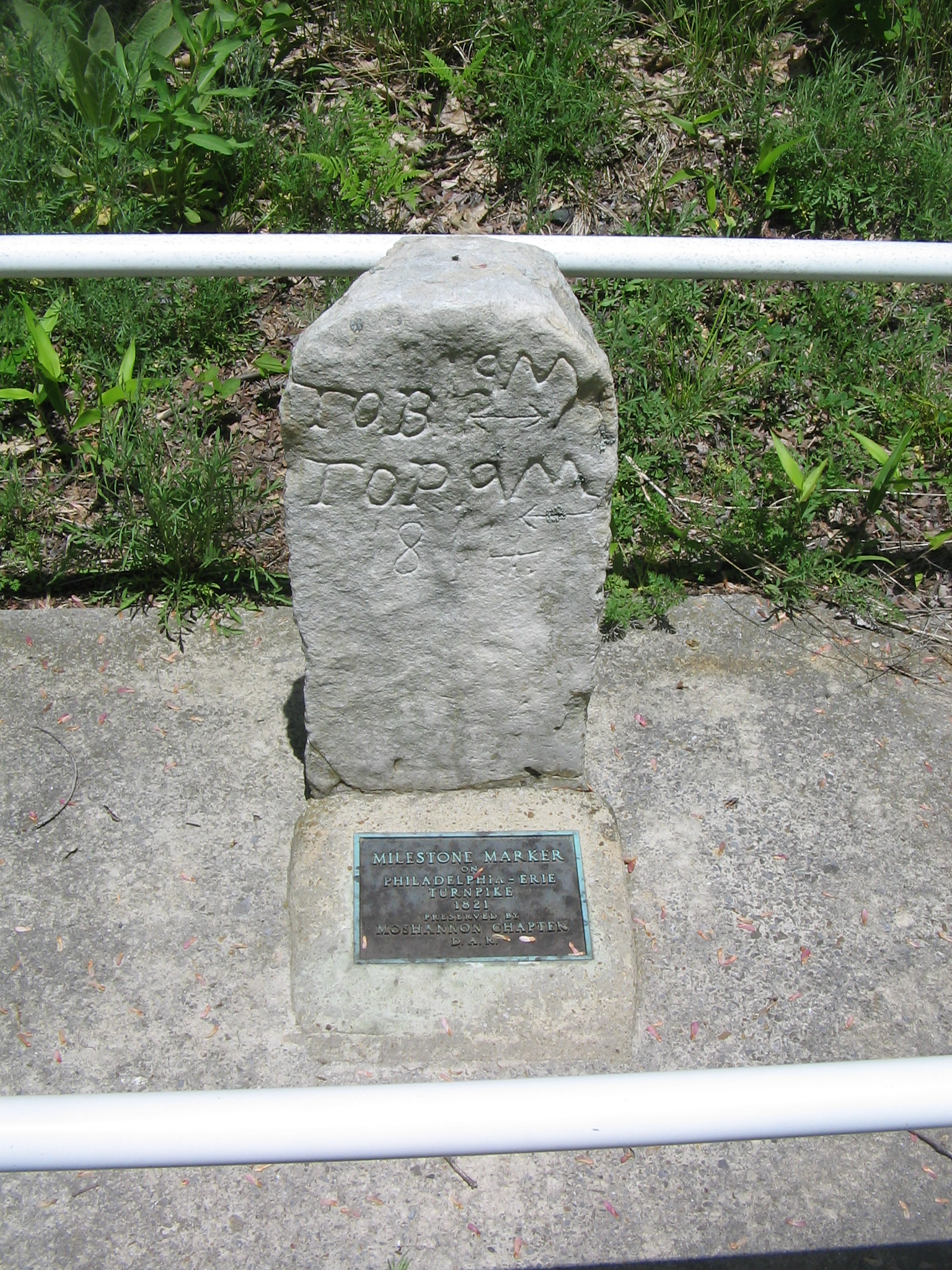
One of the historic mile markers from 1821 along the highway, within Black Moshannon State Park

The route heads into Union Township. It leaves the state forest, then passes through more woodland with some agricultural clearings and local housing, making a few curves. PA 504 turns southeast and passes through more rural areas before crossing into the borough of Unionville and becoming Allegheny Street, passing homes and intersecting US 220 Alternate. At this point, PA 504 turns northeast to form a concurrency with US 220 Alternate on Union Street, running past more residences. The road leaves Unionville for Union Township once again, becoming South Eagle Valley Road and running through a mix of farmland and woodland with some homes. The two routes continue into Boggs Township and reach an intersection with PA 144, Runville Road, and Davidson Road in the community of Wingate. Here, PA 504 ends and PA 144 turns northeast to join US 220 Alternate.

== Major intersections ==
The entire route is in Centre County.

Location	mi	km	Destinations	Notes
Philipsburg	0.000	0.000	PA 53 / PA 350 south (Centre Street / West Presqueisle Street) – Coalport, Clearfield	Western terminus; northern terminus of PA 350
Philipsburg	0.597	0.961	US 322 (Railroad Street) – Clearfield, State College	
Unionville	20.765	33.418	US 220 Alt. south (Union Street) – Tyrone	Western end of US 220 Alt. concurrency
Boggs Township	24.540	39.493	US 220 Alt. north / PA 144 (South Eagle Valley Road / Runville Road) – Milesburg, Bellefonte, Snow Shoe	Eastern terminus; eastern end of US 220 Alt. concurrency
1.000 mi = 1.609 km; 1.000 km = 0.621 mi: Concurrency terminus
