= Pennsylvania Route 150 =

State highway in Pennsylvania, US

Pennsylvania Route 150

Route information
- Maintained by PennDOT
- Length: 41.125 mi (66.184 km)

Major junctions
- South end: PA 26 in College Township
- I-99 / US 220 in Benner Township; PA 144 / PA 550 in Bellefonte; I-80 / US 220 Alt. in Boggs Township; PA 26 near Howard; PA 64 in Mill Hall; Future I-99 / US 220 in Mill Hall; PA 120 in Lock Haven
- North end: Future I-99 / US 220 in Avis

Location
- Country: United States
- State: Pennsylvania
- Counties: Centre, Clinton

Highway system
- Pennsylvania State Route System; Interstate; US; State; Scenic; Legislative
← PA 149	→ PA 151

Pennsylvania Route 150 (PA 150) is a 41.1-mile-long (66.1 km) highway in Central Pennsylvania. Its southern terminus is at PA 26 in Dale Summit, Pennsylvania near State College, at the location of the Nittany Mall. Its northern terminus is at U.S. Route 220 (US 220) in Avis.

Since the construction of Interstate 99 (I-99) in the area north of State College, the major use of the southernmost portion of PA 150 is to connect traffic from the expressway to downtown State College and Pennsylvania State University (via a section of PA 26).

The names of this road include Benner Pike, Main Street, Willowbank Street, Water Street, Bald Eagle Valley Road, High Street, Bellefonte Avenue, Church Street, and Woodward Avenue. The route is also concurrent with PA 144 between Bellefonte and Milesburg, in addition to PA 550 briefly in Bellefonte.

The route was signed in 1928 and in 1930, the route was paved from Hublersburg to Howard.

== Route description ==
=== Centre County ===
PA 150 begins at an intersection with PA 26/PA 144 Truck in College Township, Centre County, heading northeast on Benner Pike, a five-lane road with a center left-turn lane. The route runs through shopping areas, passing to the west of Nittany Mall. Past the Shiloh Road intersection, the road becomes a three-lane road with a center left-turn lane, heading into farmland with some development and crossing into Benner Township. At this point, PA 150 runs through agricultural areas on the grounds of State Correctional Institution – Rockview and becomes a two-lane road. The route heads north and reaches an interchange with I-99/US 220 before leaving the state prison grounds and gaining a center left-turn lane again, heading past farmland before running near commercial establishments. The road curves to the north-northwest as it runs through a mix of farmland and woodland with some businesses, becoming a two-lane road again. PA 150 crosses into Spring Township and turns northeast, heading into residential areas, becoming Willowbank Street.

PA 150 intersects PA 550, with that route forming a concurrency with PA 150, heading into the borough of Bellefonte. The road becomes South Water Street and passes residences and a few businesses, crossing a Nittany and Bald Eagle Railroad line and curving to the north. PA 550 splits from PA 150 by heading east on West High Street, and PA 150 continues through more commercial areas along the east bank of Spring Creek on North Water Street. The route comes to an intersection with PA 144, where that route turns north to join PA 150, with the road heading north into areas of homes and businesses. PA 144/PA 150 enters Spring Township again and becomes Pleasantview Boulevard, heading into wooded areas with some commercial development, curving to the northeast before heading to the northwest. The road passes through a gap in forested Bald Eagle Mountain and crosses into Boggs Township, turning to the north again. PA 144/PA 150 heads into the borough of Milesburg and becomes Turnpike Street, passing homes. The two route turn northwest onto Mill Street and pass businesses, crossing Bald Eagle Creek. Past this, the road becomes a divided highway, soon widening to four lanes as it crosses over a Nittany and Bald Eagle Railroad line and comes to an interchange with US 220 Alternate.

At this point, PA 144 turns southwest to join US 220 Alternate and PA 150 turns northeast to join US 220 Alternate on Eagle Valley Road, a four-lane divided highway. The road crosses back into Boggs Township and runs through wooded areas to the north of the railroad line, coming to an interchange with I-80. At this interchange, US 220 Alternate heads east on I-80 and PA 150 continues northeast on North Eagle Valley Road, passing businesses and narrowing into a two-lane undivided road. The route heads into a mix of farmland and woodland with some homes, running to the northwest of Bald Eagle Creek. The road heads into Howard Township, where it heads into more forested areas and forms the northwestern boundary of Bald Eagle State Park. PA 150 comes to an intersection with the northern terminus of PA 26 and runs along the northwestern shore of Foster Joseph Sayers Reservoir. The route enters Liberty Township and passes through more of the state park. After leaving the park boundaries, the road heads into agricultural areas and passes near the residential community of Blanchard.

=== Clinton County ===
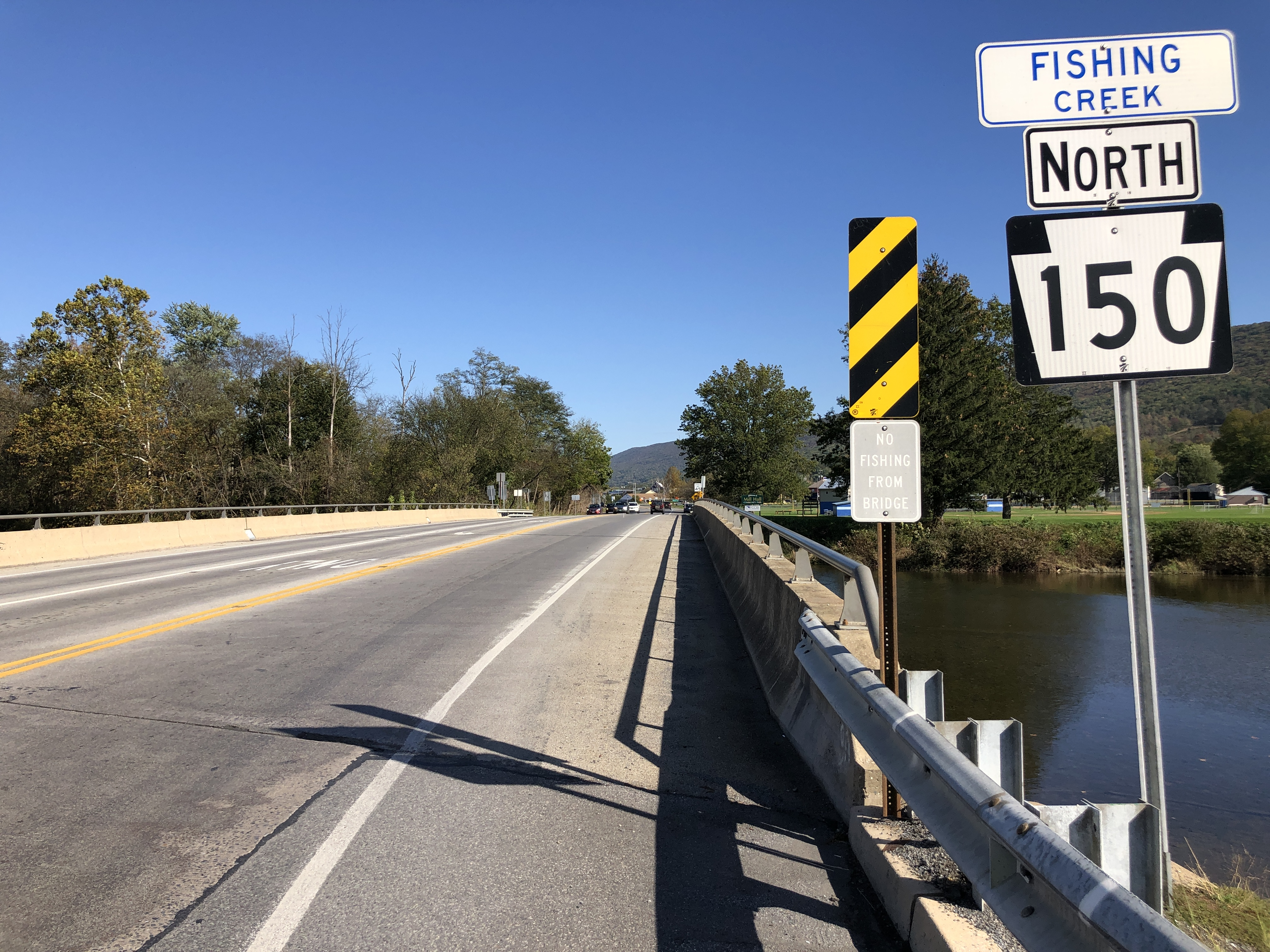
PA 150 northbound crossing Fishing Creek on the border of Mill Hall and Bald Eagle Township

PA 150 crosses the Beech Creek into the borough of Beech Creek in Clinton County and heads east as Main Street, passing homes and a few businesses. The route enters Beech Creek Township and becomes Eagle Valley Road, running past more residences before turning northeast into agricultural areas with some woods and homes. The road continues into Bald Eagle Township and runs through more rural areas before passing a few areas of residential development. PA 150 curves to the east and crosses the Bald Eagle Creek, passing a mix of homes and businesses as it heads into the borough of Mill Hall. The road passes more commercial establishments, becoming the border between Bald Eagle Township to the north and Mill Hall to the south before intersecting the northern terminus of PA 64. At this point, the route becomes Hogan Boulevard, crossing Fishing Creek and fully entering Bald Eagle Township again. PA 150 widens into a four-lane divided highway and comes to an interchange with the US 220 freeway, heading into business areas. The road becomes a three-lane road with a center left-turn lane as it heads northeast past more commercial establishments.

The route turns north and narrows to two lanes, crossing the Bald Eagle Creek and briefly running through Allison Township before heading into the borough of Flemington. At this point, PA 150 turns north-northeast and becomes High Street, a three-lane road with a center left-turn lane that is lined with several homes. The road heads into commercial areas and turns northeast onto Bellefonte Avenue, crossing into the city of Lock Haven. The route continues into more residential areas before entering the commercial downtown of Lock Haven, where it narrows to two lanes and crosses Norfolk Southern's Buffalo Line. PA 150 becomes a one-way pair that follows two-lane East Church Street northbound and two-lane East Main Street southbound, heading east through more of the downtown and intersecting PA 120. The one-way pair heads past homes, with northbound PA 150 heading north on North Washington Street to join southbound PA 150 on two-lane, two-way East Main Street. The route passes more residences before passing near William T. Piper Memorial Airport and turning northeast to cross the West Branch Susquehanna River into Woodward Township. At this point, the road becomes Woodward Avenue and passes homes and businesses in the community of Dunnstown. PA 150 curves to the east and passes more homes, crossing into Dunnstable Township, where it heads into wooded areas with a few residences. The road curves northeast and runs through a mix of farmland and woodland. Upon crossing into Pine Creek Township, the route enters more wooded areas and passes through the residential communities of Chatham and Charlton, turning to the east. PA 150 heads through more rural residential areas before turning south onto Carl Kephart Boulevard and ending at a diamond interchange with the US 220 freeway.

== Major intersections ==
County	Location	mi	km	Destinations	Notes
Centre	College Township	0.000	0.000	PA 26 (East College Avenue) – State College, Pleasant Gap	Southern terminus
Centre	Benner Township	3.136– 3.510	5.047– 5.649	I-99 / US 220 to I-80 – State College	Exit 78 on I-99
Centre	Bellefonte	5.787	9.313	PA 550 south (West Water Street) – Fillmore	Southern end of PA 550 concurrency
Centre	Bellefonte	6.339	10.202	PA 550 north (West High Street)	Northern end of PA 550 concurrency
Centre	Bellefonte	6.762	10.882	PA 144 south (West Linn Street) – Lewistown	Southern end of PA 144 concurrency
Centre	Milesburg	9.247– 9.595	14.882– 15.442	US 220 Alt. south / PA 144 north (South Eagle Valley Road) – Snow Shoe, Tyrone	Interchange; northern end of PA 144 concurrency; southern end of US 220 Alt. concurrency
Centre	Boggs Township	10.129– 10.604	16.301– 17.065	I-80 / US 220 Alt. north – DuBois, Bellefonte	Northern end of US 220 Alt. concurrency; exit 158 on I-80
Centre	Howard Township	17.502	28.167	PA 26 south – Howard	Northern terminus of PA 26
Clinton	Mill Hall	29.429	47.361	PA 64 south (North Water Street) – State College	Northern terminus of PA 64
Clinton	Mill Hall	29.776– 29.807	47.920– 47.970	Future I-99 / US 220 to I-80 – Milesburg, Lock Haven	Exit 109 on US 220
Clinton	Lock Haven	32.510	52.320	PA 120 (North Jay Street) – Renovo	
Clinton	Avis	40.125	64.575	Future I-99 / US 220 – Lock Haven, Williamsport	Northern terminus; exit 118 on US 220
1.000 mi = 1.609 km; 1.000 km = 0.621 mi: Concurrency terminus
