= Wingate, Pennsylvania =

- Unincorporated community
- Location within Pennsylvania
- Coordinates: 40.9348°N 77.8139°W
- Country: United States
- State: Pennsylvania
- County: Centre
- Township: Boggs
- Elevation: 725 ft (221 m)
- Time zone: UTC-5 (Eastern (EST))
  - Summer (DST): UTC-4 (EDT)
- Area code: 814
- GNIS feature ID: 1191597

Wingate is an unincorporated community in Boggs Township, Centre County, Pennsylvania, United States. It is at the junction of PA 144 and PA 504.

Bald Eagle Area Middle and High School and Wingate Elementary School are in Wingate.
