= Hartleton, Pennsylvania =

Borough in Pennsylvania, US

- Borough
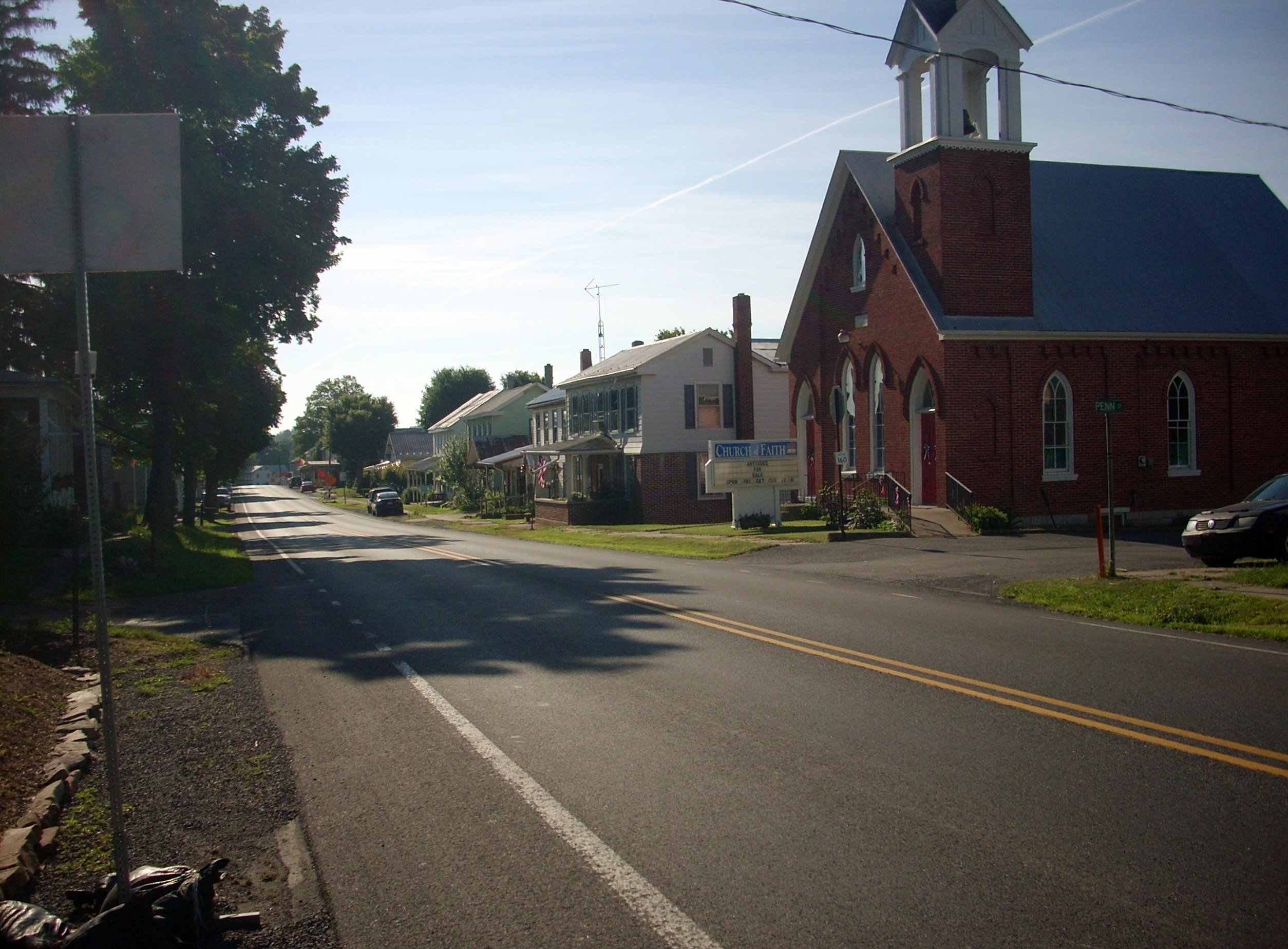
- Pennsylvania Route 45 passes through Hartleton

- Location of Hartleton in Union County, Pennsylvania.

- Location within the U.S. state of Pennsylvania Hartleton (the United States)
- Coordinates: 40°54′01″N 77°09′19″W
- Country: United States
- State: Pennsylvania
- County: Union
- Settled 1775: 1798-1799 town laid out
- Incorporated (borough): September 18, 1858

Area
  - Total: 0.91 sq mi (2.35 km^{2})
  - Land: 0.91 sq mi (2.35 km^{2})
  - Water: 0 sq mi (0.00 km^{2})
- Elevation (center of borough): 650 ft (200 m)
- Highest elevation (western borough boundary by Harleton Cemetery): 760 ft (230 m)
- Lowest elevation (Cold Run at southeast borough boundary): 610 ft (190 m)

Population (2020)
  - Total: 251
  - Density: 276.3/sq mi (106.69/km^{2})
- Time zone: Eastern (EST)
  - Summer (DST): EDT
- Zip code: 17829
- Area code: 570
- FIPS code: 42-32936

Hartleton is a borough in Union County, Pennsylvania, United States. The population was 247 at the 2020 census. The borough, as well as the adjoining township of Hartley, are both named for Colonel Thomas Hartley, American politician and Revolutionary War leader, and local landowner.

An alternative name was Hartleyton and later shortened to the present name. The original name was Kester's (akin to Keister today), and named for Peter Kester who was the first tenant of Hartley. Kester's was on the "great Reuben Haines road" from Northumberland through Dry Valley, New Berlin and the Penns Valley Narrows, and the first public road laid out in the area by Northumberland County court. The road from Derrstown (Lewisburg) through Mifflinburg intersected the Haines Road at Hartleton (this road from Derrstown through the Penns Valley Narrows eventually became what is known as the turnpike).

Hartley never lived there, as his home was in York, PA. Hartley acquired the land in 1784 from original purchaser Colonel Philip Cole after Cole left the area because of the "Big Runaway" of 1778. Cole purchased the land in 1773, and was living there in 1775. Hartley laid out a town as early as 1798, and the first lot sold in 1799.

== Geography ==
Hartleton is located at 40°54′1″N 77°9′19″W (40.900148, -77.155229).

According to the United States Census Bureau, the borough has a total area of 0.9 square miles (2.3 km^{2}), all land.

== Demographics ==
Historical population
Census	Pop.	Note	%±
1870	292		—
1880	300		2.7%
1890	261		−13.0%
1900	237		−9.2%
1910	160		−32.5%
1920	161		0.6%
1930	169		5.0%
1940	208		23.1%
1950	240		15.4%
1960	234		−2.5%
1970	223		−4.7%
1980	220		−1.3%
1990	246		11.8%
2000	260		5.7%
2010	283		8.8%
2020	251		−11.3%
2021 (est.)	248	▼	−1.2%

As of the census of 2000, there were 260 people, 89 households, and 71 families residing in the borough. The population density was 286.4 inhabitants per square mile (110.6/km^{2}). There were 91 housing units at an average density of 100.2 per square mile (38.7/km^{2}). The racial makeup of the borough was 97.31% White, and 2.69% from two or more races. Hispanic or Latino of any race were 0.38% of the population.

There were 89 households, out of which 33.7% had children under the age of 18 living with them, 65.2% were married couples living together, 10.1% had a female householder with no husband present, and 20.2% were non-families. 19.1% of all households were made up of individuals, and 14.6% had someone living alone who was 65 years of age or older. The average household size was 2.72 and the average family size was 3.11.

In the borough the population was spread out, with 27.7% under the age of 18, 6.2% from 18 to 24, 26.9% from 25 to 44, 26.2% from 45 to 64, and 13.1% who were 65 years of age or older. The median age was 37 years. For every 100 females there were 104.7 males. For every 100 females age 18 and over, there were 97.9 males.

The median income for a household in the borough was $40,938, and the median income for a family was $42,188. Males had a median income of $31,250 versus $19,375 for females. The per capita income for the borough was $14,714. None of the families and 1.1% of the population were living below the poverty line.

== Education ==
It is in the Mifflinburg Area School District.
