= Birmingham Bridge (Birmingham, Pennsylvania) =

Bridge in Pennsylvania, US

- U.S. National Register of Historic Places
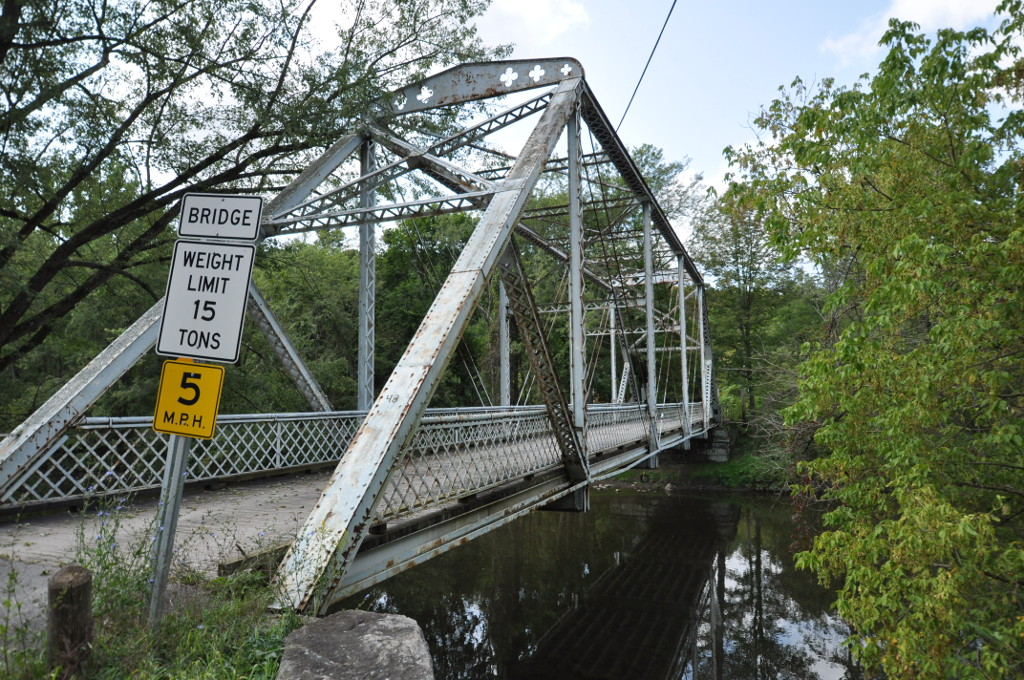
- Birmingham Bridge, September 2017

- Location within Pennsylvania Location within the United States
- Location: Over the Juniata River, north of Birmingham off Pennsylvania Route 350, Tyrone Township, Pennsylvania and Warriors Mark Township, Pennsylvania
- Coordinates: 40°38′56″N 78°11′57″W
- Area: less than one acre
- Built: 1898
- Built by: Pennsylvania Bridge Co.
- Architectural style: Pratt through truss bridge
- MPS: Industrial Resources of Huntingdon County, 1780--1939 MPS
- NRHP reference No.: 90000400
- Added to NRHP: March 20, 1990

Birmingham Bridge, also known as Huntingdon County Bridge No. 15 and Blair County Bridge No. 48, is a historic Pratt truss bridge spanning the Little Juniata River and located at Tyrone Township, Blair County and Warriors Mark Township, Huntingdon County, Pennsylvania. It was built by the Pennsylvania Bridge Co. in 1898. It measures 137 ft (42 m) in length and has a 14.7-foot-wide (4.5 m) bridge deck. It is the only means of access to two dwellings on the Blair County side of the river.

It was added to the National Register of Historic Places in 1990.
