= Warriors Mark, Pennsylvania =

Unincorporated community in Pennsylvania, US

- Unincorporated community
- Location within Pennsylvania Location within the United States
- Coordinates: 40°42′07″N 78°07′44″W
- Country: United States
- State: Pennsylvania
- County: Huntingdon
- Township: Warriors Mark
- Elevation: 1,083 ft (330 m)
- Time zone: UTC-5 (Eastern (EST))
  - Summer (DST): UTC-4 (EDT)
- ZIP code: 16877
- Area code: 814
- GNIS feature ID: 2830929

Warriors Mark is an unincorporated community in Huntingdon County, Pennsylvania, United States. The community is located at the intersection of state routes 350 and 550, 16.3 miles (26.2 km) north-northwest of Huntingdon. Warriors Mark has a post office, with ZIP code 16877.

== Demographics ==
Historical population
Census	Pop.	Note	%±

The United States Census Bureau defined Warriors Mark as a census designated place (CDP) in 2023.
