= Pennsylvania Route 144 =

State highway in Pennsylvania, US

Pennsylvania Route 144
- PA 144 in red and PA 144 Truck in blue

Route information
- Maintained by PennDOT
- Length: 108.995 mi (175.410 km)
- Existed: 1928–present
- Tourist routes: High Plateau Scenic Byway

Major junctions
- South end: SR 2015 in Potter Township
- PA 45 in Centre Hall; PA 192 in Centre Hall; PA 26 in Pleasant Gap; PA 150 near Milesburg; PA 504 in Wingate; I-80 in Snow Shoe; PA 53 near Snow Shoe; PA 120 in Renovo; PA 44 near Carter Camp
- North end: US 6 in Galeton

Location
- Country: United States
- State: Pennsylvania
- Counties: Centre, Clinton, Potter

Highway system
- Pennsylvania State Route System; Interstate; US; State; Scenic; Legislative
← PA 143	→ PA 145

Pennsylvania Route 144 (PA 144) is a state highway located in the U.S. state of Pennsylvania, covering a distance of about 109 miles (175 km). The southern terminus is located near an interchange with U.S. Route 322 (US 322) at State Route 2015 (SR 2015, Old Route 322) in Potter Township while the northern terminus is located at US 6 in Galeton. Between Snow Shoe and Renovo, PA 144 is known as the High Plateau Scenic Byway, a Pennsylvania Scenic Byway.

== Route description ==
=== Centre County ===
PA 144 begins at an intersection with SR 2015 (Old Route 322), which provides access to an interchange with US 322 and the southern terminus of PA 144 Truck, in the community of Potters Mills in Potter Township, Centre County, heading north on two-lane undivided Old Fort Road. The road passes residences in the community before curving northwest and heading through farmland with some woods and homes in the Penns Valley. The route passes through the community of Centre Hill before it comes to a junction with PA 45 in the community of Old Fort. PA 144 becomes South Pennsylvania Avenue and enters the borough of Centre Hall, where it is lined with homes and a few businesses. The road becomes North Pennsylvania Avenue and runs through the downtown area before it reaches an intersection with the western terminus of PA 192 in the northern part of town. Past this intersection, the route turns west and passes residences, with a southbound runaway truck ramp, before it leaves Centre Hall for Potter Township again. PA 144 heads into forested areas and ascends Nittany Mountain, curving southwest before turning to the west and crossing into Spring Township. The road gains a center left-turn lane passes some homes and businesses before it becomes a three-lane road with one northbound lane and two southbound lanes and turns north into forests, descending the mountain. The route curves northwest and becomes South Main Street, passing through Pleasant Gap.

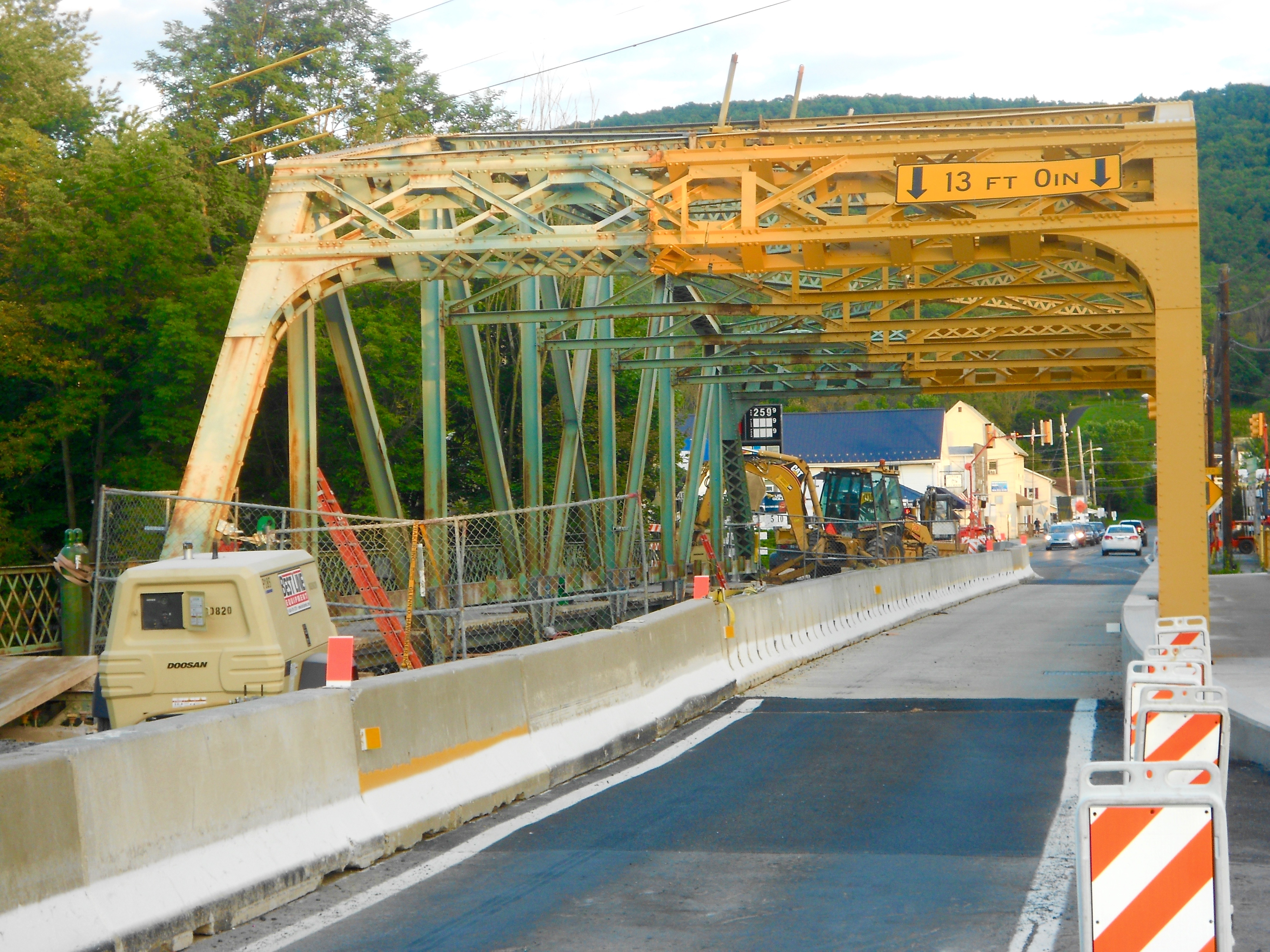
PA 144 crossing Spring Creek in Milesburg

PA 144 enters the Nittany Valley and heads into the community of Pleasant Gap, running past homes and a few commercial establishments and coming to a northbound runaway truck ramp. The road curves to the west-northwest and runs through more residential areas, crossing an abandoned railroad line before reaching an intersection with PA 26 and the northern terminus of PA 144 Truck. Past this junction, the route becomes North Main Street through more developed areas, passing under a Nittany and Bald Eagle Railroad line. PA 144 becomes Axemann Road and runs through a mix of farm fields and development, curving north and running to the east of Logan Branch and a Nittany and Bald Eagle Railroad line. The road passes under Interstate 99 (I-99) and US 220 and winds north through wooded areas with some homes, heading through the community of Axemann. The route curves northwest and continues parallel to the creek and railroad line, passing to the northeast of a factory before heading into the borough of Bellefonte. Here, PA 144 becomes Pine Street and turns northeast into residential areas. The route bends north onto South Spring Street and heads into the commercial downtown, turning east onto West Bishop Street. A block later, PA 144 intersects PA 550 and turns north for a concurrency with that route on South Allegheny Street. PA 550 splits from PA 144 west of the Centre County Courthouse by turning west onto West High Street, with PA 144 continuing north along North Allegheny Street. The route leaves downtown Bellefonte and runs past homes, turning west onto West Linn Street. PA 144 curves northwest and comes to an intersection with PA 150, where it turns north to join PA 150, with the road heading north into areas of homes and businesses. PA 144/PA 150 enters Spring Township again and becomes Pleasantview Boulevard, heading into wooded areas with some commercial development, curving to the northeast before heading to the northwest. The road passes through a gap in forested Bald Eagle Mountain and crosses into Boggs Township, turning to the north again. PA 144/PA 150 heads into the borough of Milesburg and becomes Turnpike Street, passing homes. The two route turn northwest onto Mill Street and pass businesses, crossing Bald Eagle Creek. Past this, the road becomes a divided highway, soon widening to four lanes as it crosses over a Nittany and Bald Eagle Railroad line and comes to an interchange with US 220 Alternate (US 220 Alt.).

At this point, PA 144 turns southwest to join US 220 Alt. and PA 150 turns northeast to join US 220 Alt. on Appalachian Thruway, a four-lane divided highway. The road runs along the border between Boggs Township to the north and Milesburg to the south, passing near homes and businesses. The two routes fully enter Boggs Township and become a two-lane undivided road, heading near homes and businesses and passing to the south of Bald Eagle High School. In the community of Wingate, PA 144 splits from US 220 Bus., which continues southwest concurrent with PA 504, by heading northwest onto Runville Road, passing through farmland before heading between industrial areas to the southwest and woodland to the northeast. The road heads north-northwest through forested areas with some fields and homes, passing through the communities of Runville and Gum Stump. The route continues through dense forests and becomes Snow Shoe Mountain Road, heading into rugged terrain and turning west, northeast, and northwest. PA 144 heads northwest and curves north before it enters Snow Shoe Township and passes over I-80.

The road becomes East Sycamore Road and turns to the west-northwest, running to the north of the interstate through forests. The route bends west and passes homes before running near businesses and coming to an intersection with Beech Creek Road, which heads south to an interchange with I-80. From here, PA 144 passes commercial development before crossing into the borough of Snow Shoe, where it becomes East Sycamore Street and heads through residential areas. The road curves northwest and becomes West Sycamore Street before it heads back into Snow Shoe Township. The route runs west through wooded areas with some fields and development as West Sycamore Road, passing through the community of Gillintown. In the community of Moshannon, PA 144 intersects the northern terminus of PA 53 and turns north onto Spruce Road, passing through woodland with some fields and residences. The road comes to a junction with the eastern terminus of PA 879 and turns northeast into dense forests. The route enters Burnside Township and becomes an unnamed road, curving to the north. PA 144 enters the Sproul State Forest and turns northeast, becoming Ridge Road. Farther along, the road curves back to the north.

=== Clinton County ===
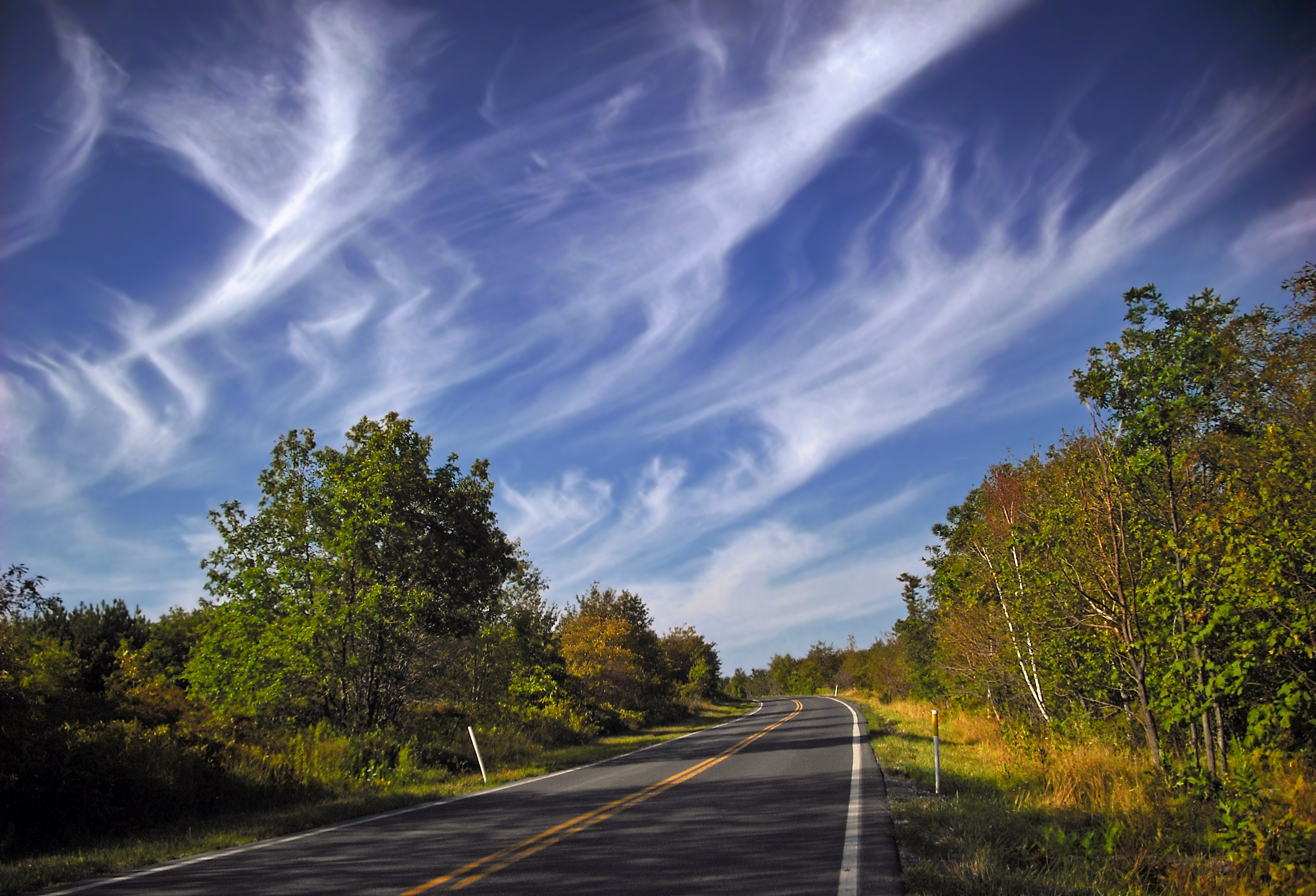
PA 144 in Noyes Township in Clinton County

PA 144 enters Beech Creek Township in Clinton County and continues through the Sproul State Forest, becoming Breeze Avenue and turning to the east. The road curves northeast and winds through more of the state forest, crossing into Noyes Township. The route reaches the community of State Camp and turns to the northwest through more forest. PA 144 curves north and winds alongside Hall Run, passing to the west of the Jesse Hall Picnic Area. The road leaves Sproul State Forest and continues through a mix of woods and homes, curving east and running along the south bank of the West Branch Susquehanna River. The route runs through more forests before it enters the borough of South Renovo and becomes Pennsylvania Avenue, which is lined with homes. PA 144 turns north onto 4th Street and crosses the West Branch Susquehanna River. At this point, the route heads into the borough of Renovo and becomes Birch Street, heading north to an intersection with PA 120. Here, PA 144 turns west to form a concurrency with PA 120 on Huron Avenue, passing residences before heading past a few businesses in the center of the borough. The road continues past a mix of homes and businesses and heads west-northwest onto Champlain Avenue, running along the north bank of the West Branch Susquehanna River. PA 120/PA 144 becomes Renovo Road and comes to a bridge over Norfolk Southern's Buffalo Line, curving west to run through wooded areas to the north of the railroad tracks and the river.

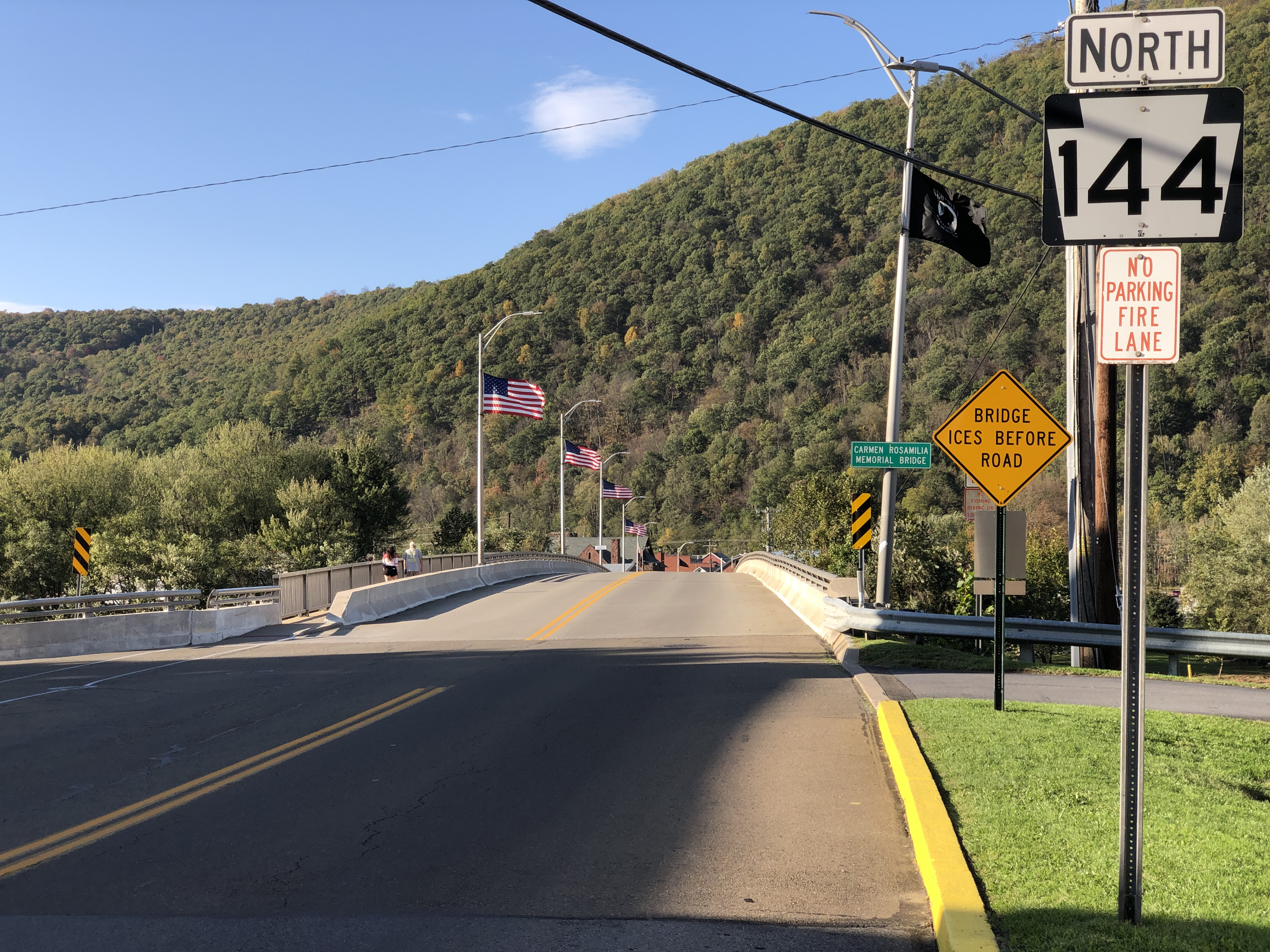
PA 144 northbound in South Renovo

PA 144 splits from PA 120 by heading north-northwest onto Tamarack Road, leaving Renovo for Noyes Township again and passing through the community of Drurys Run. The road heads back into the Sproul State Forest and continues northwest, entering Leidy Township. The route winds to the northwest through dense forests before it bends to the north. Farther along, PA 144 curves northwest and leaves the state forest, making a turn to the northeast before turning back to the northwest and passing through the community of Tamarack. The road heads into dense forests and turns to the west, heading back into the Sproul State Forest. The route leaves the forest and passes fields before it crosses Kettle Creek. After this, PA 144 turns northeast onto Kettle Creek Road, running parallel to the creek. The road runs through forested areas with some homes to the west of Kettle Creek, winding to the north before heading northeast as it passes near tracts of the Sproul State Forest.

=== Potter County ===
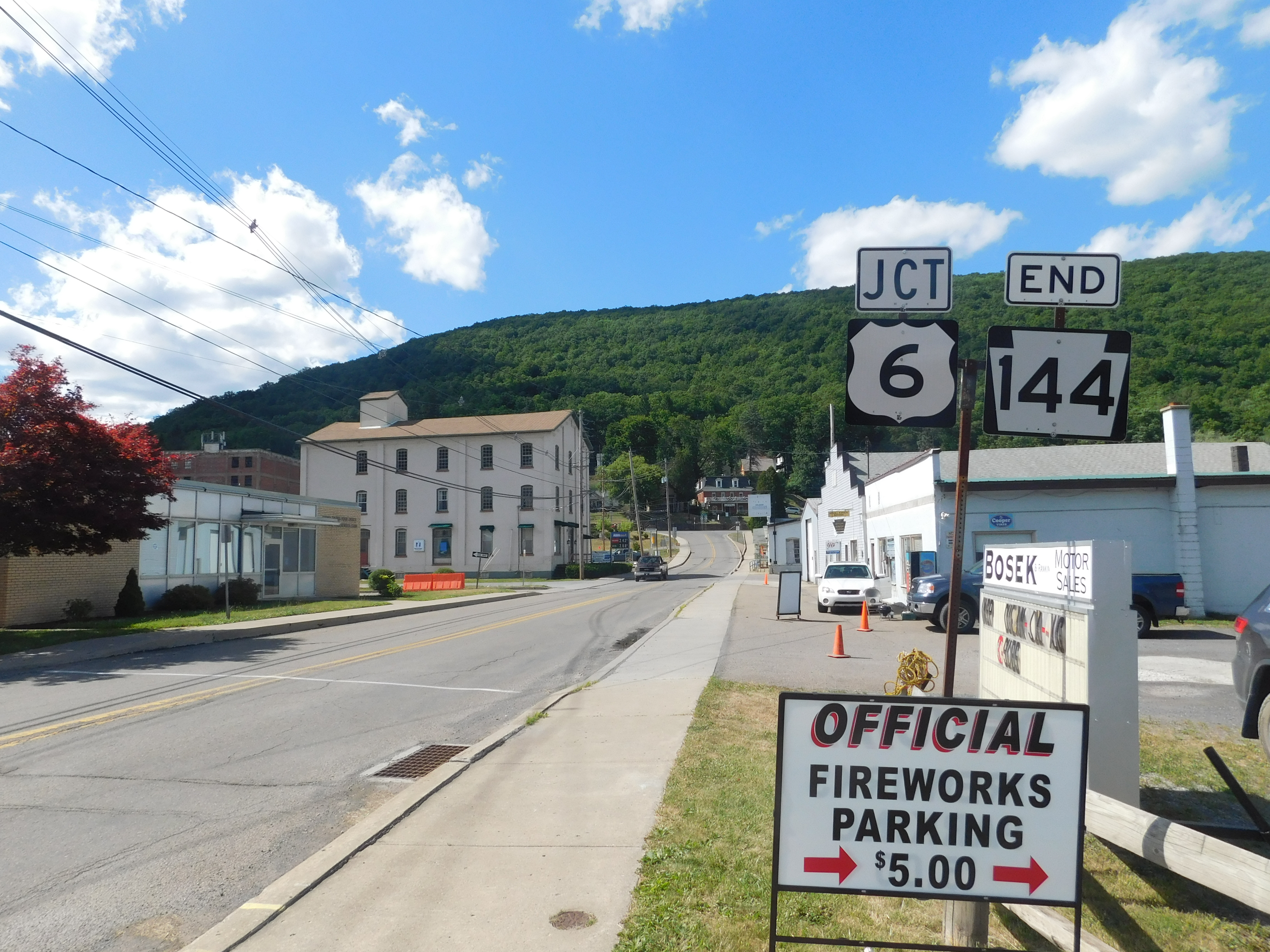
PA 144 approaching US 6 in Galeton

PA 144 heads into Stewardson Township in Potter County and becomes an unnamed road, heading through the Susquehannock State Forest to the west of Kettle Creek. The road turns to the east and passes through the community of Cross Fork as Chestnut Street. The route curves back to the northeast and becomes Ole Bull Road, continuing through more of the Susquehannock State Forest parallel to the creek. PA 144 crosses to the east side of Kettle Creek and leaves the state forest boundary for a short distance before crossing back into it. The road continues through the state forest land and passes to the east of Ole Bull State Park. The route heads to the north and crosses Kettle Creek before coming to an intersection with PA 44 in the community of Oleona. At this point, PA 44 and PA 144 head north concurrent on Pine Hill Road, passing through more of the Susquehannock State Forest and entering Abbott Township. The road runs through forests to the east of Little Kettle Creek. Farther north, PA 44/PA 144 leaves the state forest and continues through more wooded areas to the community of Carter Camp, where PA 144 splits from PA 44 by heading east onto Germania Road.

Upon splitting from PA 44, PA 144 heads east briefly before turning northeast and running through forested areas with some fields. The road winds northeast before it turns east and runs through farmland. The route heads into the community of Germania, where it passes homes and turns to the north. PA 144 runs through a mix of farms and woods and crosses into West Branch Township, curving to the northeast. The road heads into forested areas and turns to the north, running to the west of South Branch Pine Creek. Farther north, the route enters the borough of Galeton and becomes 5th Street, passing homes. PA 144 briefly jogs east at Germania Street and becomes Bridge Street, heading north across Pine Creek and passing businesses in the center of Galeton before coming to its northern terminus at an intersection with US 6.

== History ==
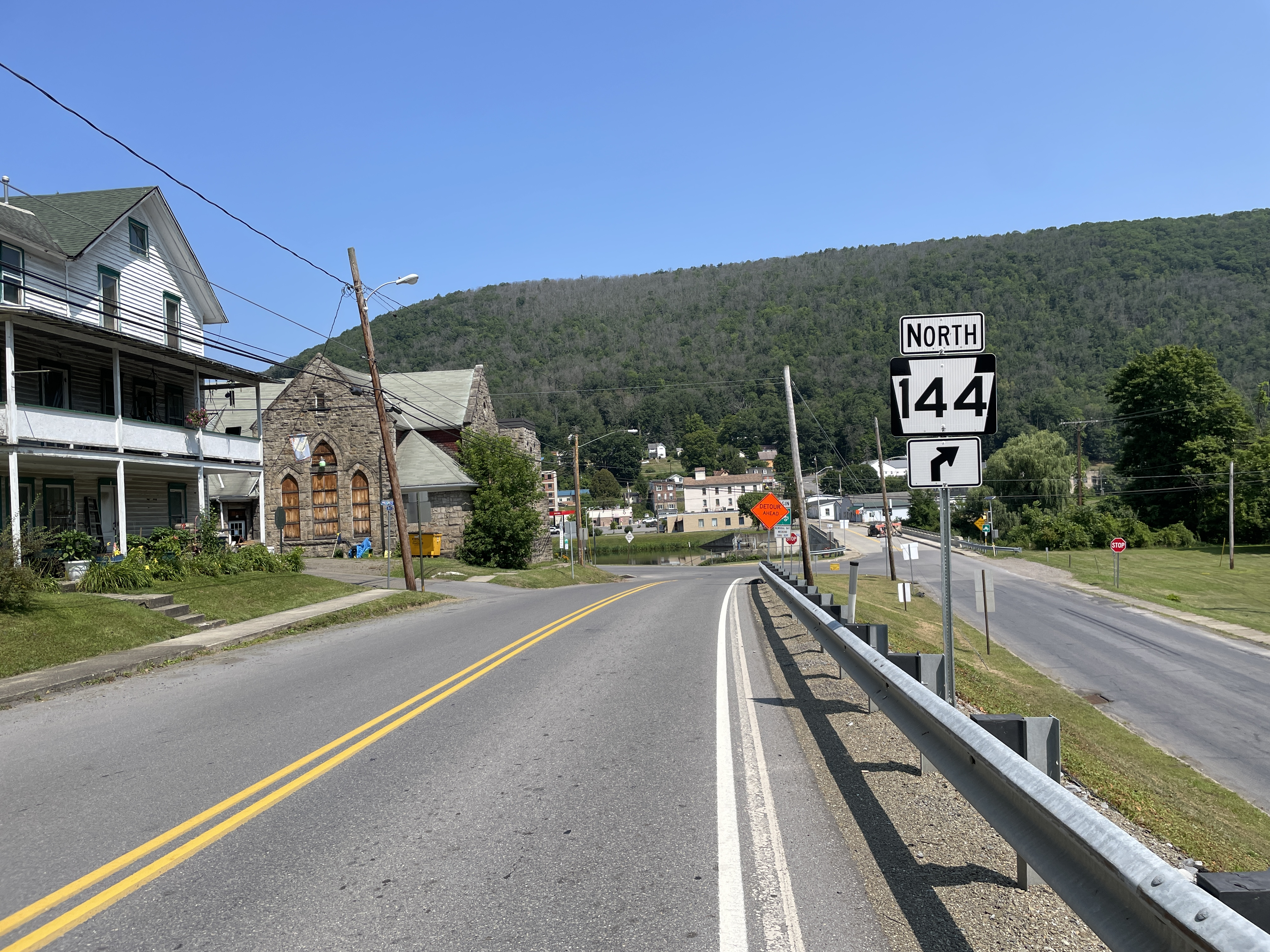
PA 144 northbound in Galeton

PA 144 was first designated by its current number in 1928. The route was paved between Carter Camp and Germania in 1932. The portion of the route between Galeton and Germania was completed in 1935 and the southern terminus of the route was moved from Carter Camp to Moshannon on May 27, 1935. In the following years, several sections of PA 144 were paved, including the section from Sproul State Forest to the Clinton County line in 1936 and around Cross Fork and within the Sproul State Forest in 1938. In 1940, more of the road was paved; the newly paved sections ran from the southern edge of the Sproul State Forest to the Clinton County line, within the Sproul State Forest, and from the Clinton County line to Cross Fork. PA 144 was extended south to Potters Mills in 1967. In 1969, the road was built into a divided highway from then-U.S. Route 220 to Milesburg.

== Major intersections ==
County	Location	mi	km	Destinations	Notes
Centre	Potter Township	0.000	0.000	SR 2015 (Old Route 322) to US 322	Southern terminus
Centre	Potter Township	3.872	6.231	PA 45 (Earlystown Road) – Boalsburg, State College, Lewisburg	Village of Old Fort
Centre	Centre Hall	5.080	8.175	PA 192 east (East Church Street) – Rebersburg	Western terminus of PA 192
Centre	Spring Township	9.267	14.914	PA 26 / PA 144 Truck south (College Avenue) to I-80 / I-99 – State College, Lock Haven	Northern terminus of PA 144 Truck
Centre	Bellefonte	13.673	22.005	PA 550 north (Bishop Street) / South Allegheny Street	South end of concurrency with PA 550
Centre	Bellefonte	13.754– 13.776	22.135– 22.170	PA 550 south (West High Street)	North end concurrency with PA 550
Centre	Bellefonte	14.367	23.121	PA 150 south (Water Street) to US 322 – State College	South end of PA 150 concurrency
Centre	Milesburg	16.744– 17.175	26.947– 27.640	US 220 Alt. north / PA 150 north (Eagle Valley Road) to I-80 / Moose Run Road – Yarnell	Interchange, north end of PA 150 concurrency, south end of US 220 Alternate concurrency
Centre	Boggs Township	18.476	29.734	US 220 Alt. south / PA 504 west (Eagle Valley Road) – Tyrone	North end of US 220 Alternate concurrency; eastern terminus of PA 504
Centre	Snow Shoe Township	29.131	46.882	I-80 – Bellefonte, DuBois	Interstate 80 exit 147, via Beech Creek Road (SR 4005)
Centre	Snow Shoe Township	33.001	53.110	PA 53 south (Elm Road) / Gorton Road – Philipsburg	Northern terminus of PA 53
Centre	Snow Shoe Township	34.135	54.935	PA 879 west (Pine Glen Road) / Askey Road – Karthaus, Benezette	Eastern terminus of PA 879
Clinton	Renovo	64.605	103.972	PA 120 east (Huron Avenue) / Birch Avenue – Lock Haven	East end of PA 120 concurrency
Clinton	Renovo	66.163	106.479	PA 120 west – Emporium	West end of PA 120 concurrency
Potter	Stewardson Township	93.000	149.669	PA 44 south (Pine Hill Road) – Jersey Shore	South end of PA 44 concurrency
Potter	Abbott Township	98.293	158.187	PA 44 north (Cherry Springs Road) – Coudersport	North end of PA 44 concurrency
Potter	Galeton	108.995	175.410	US 6 (Main Street) – Coudersport, Wellsboro	Northern terminus
1.000 mi = 1.609 km; 1.000 km = 0.621 mi: Concurrency terminus

== PA 144 Truck ==
Pennsylvania Route 144 Truck
- Location: Centre County, Pennsylvania
- Existed: 2009–present

Pennsylvania Route 144 Truck is a series of truck routes bypassing the southernmost segment on PA 144 in Centre County, Pennsylvania on which trucks over 10 tons except for local deliveries are prohibited. The route follows US 322 and PA 26 throughout its length. A second Truck PA 144 follows PA 45, US 322, and PA 26. It was signed in 2009.

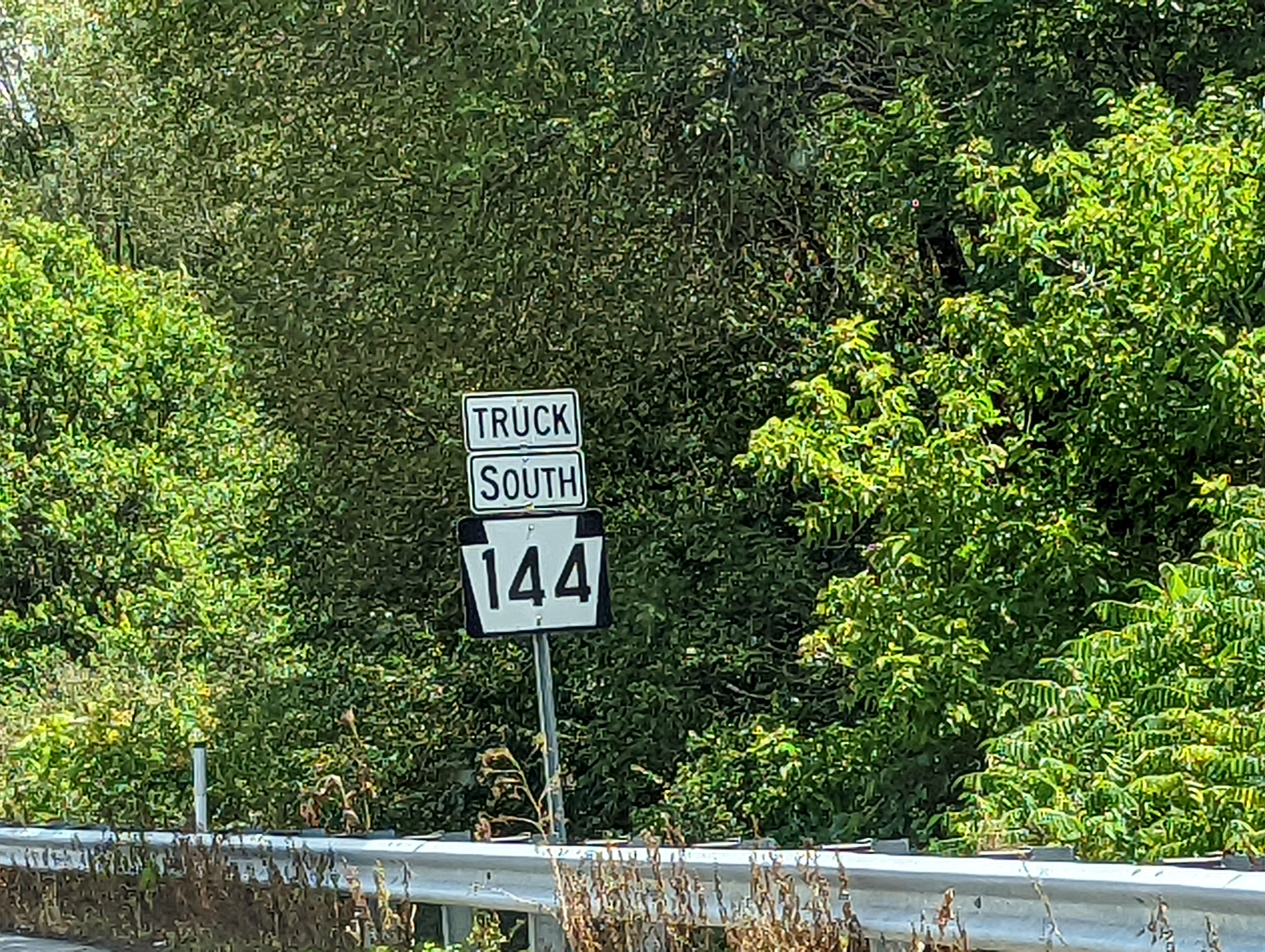
PA 144 Truck southbound along US 322 in Centre County.
