= Water Street, Pennsylvania =

Unincorporated community in Pennsylvania, US

- Unincorporated village
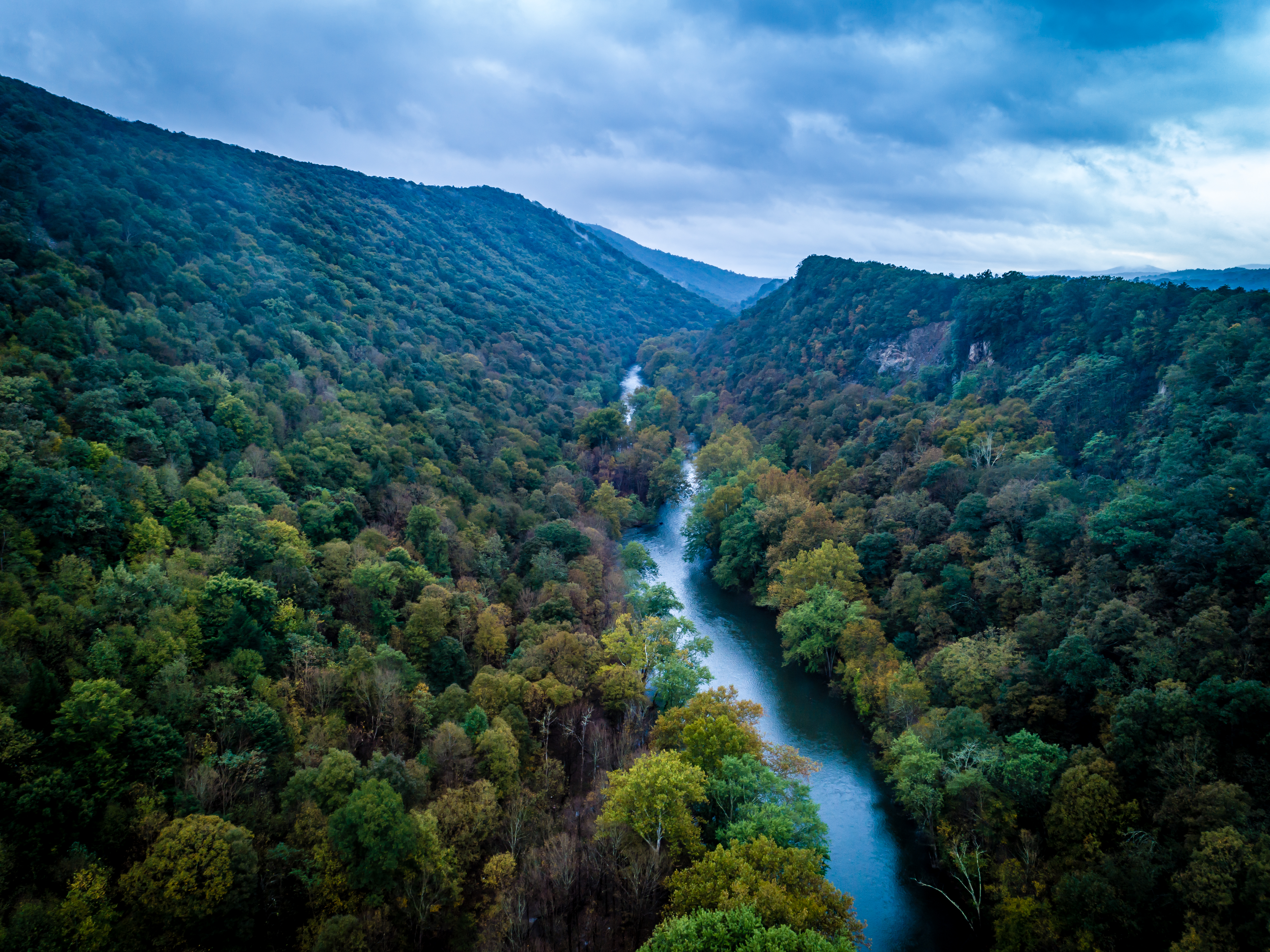
- Aerial view of the Juniata River as it passes through a water gap of the Tussey Mountain ridge at Water Street.

- Location within Pennsylvania Location within the United States
- Coordinates: 40°34′17″N 78°8′18″W
- Country: United States
- State: Pennsylvania
- County: Huntingdon
- Township: Morris
- Time zone: UTC-5 (Eastern (EST))
  - Summer (DST): UTC-4 (EDT)
- GNIS feature ID: 1200128

Water Street is a small unincorporated village in the Canoe Valley of Morris Township, part of Huntingdon County, Pennsylvania, United States. The Frankstown Branch Juniata River runs north along the west foot of the Tussey Mountain ridge to the village, before turning east along U.S. Route 22, crossing the ridge line through a water gap. The intersection of U.S. Route 22 and PA Route 453 is located in the village.

The community was so named on account of its status as a shipping point in the canal era and because the nearby Juniata River was used as a passage through Tussey Mountain at this location.
