= Morris Township, Huntingdon County, Pennsylvania =

Township in Pennsylvania, US

Coordinates: 40°34′23″N 78°09′46″W

- Township
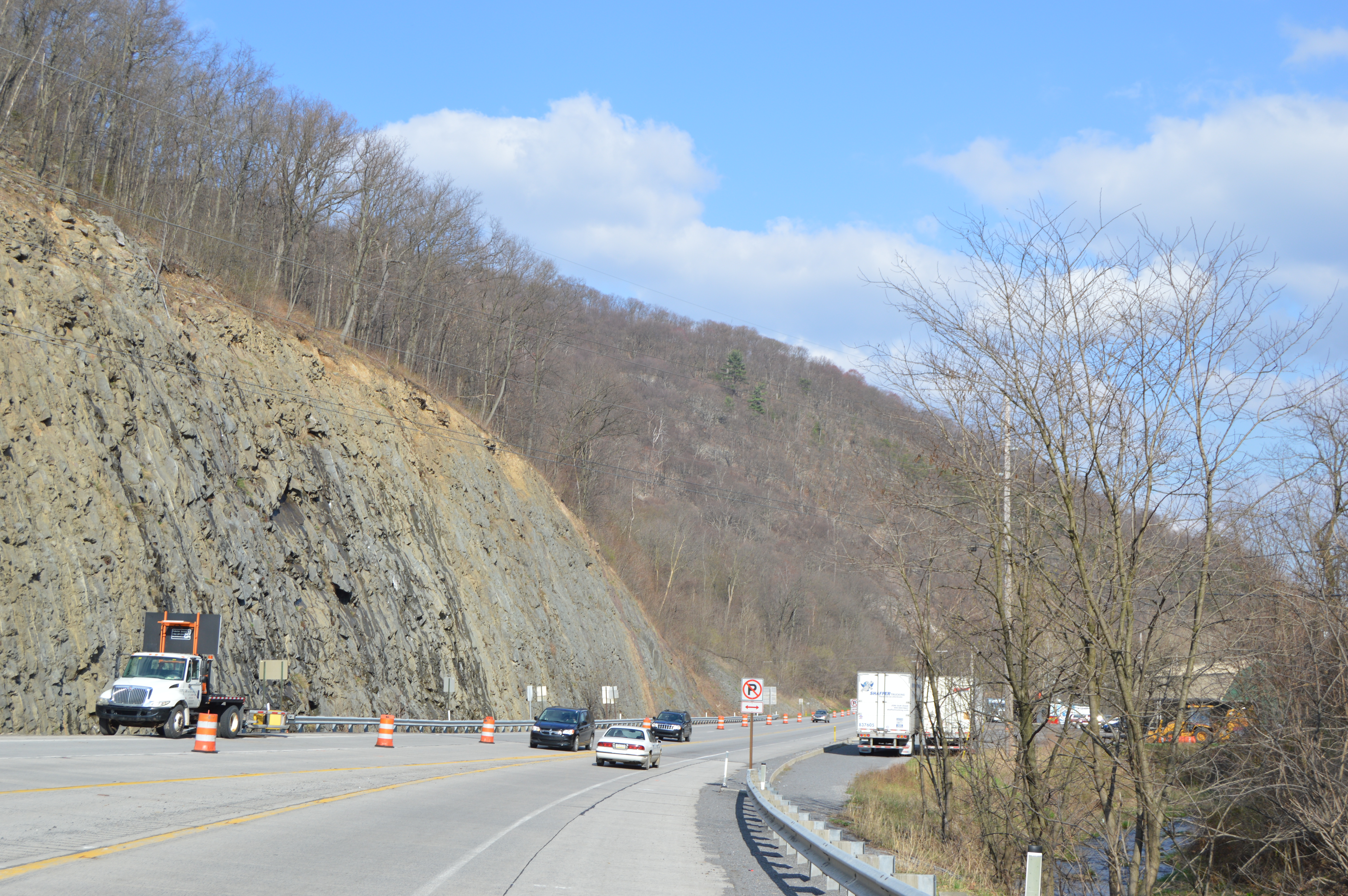
- U.S. Route 22 in eastern Morris Township

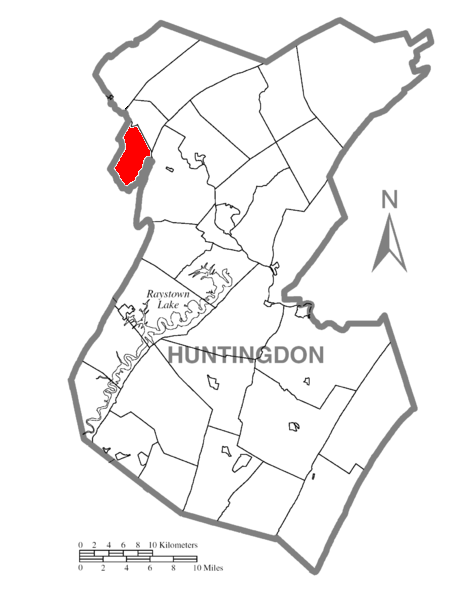
- Map of Huntingdon County, Pennsylvania Highlighting Morris Township

- Map of Huntingdon County, Pennsylvania
- Country: United States
- State: Pennsylvania
- County: Huntingdon

Area
  - Total: 12.15 sq mi (31.48 km^{2})
  - Land: 12.15 sq mi (31.48 km^{2})
  - Water: 0 sq mi (0.00 km^{2})

Population (2020)
  - Total: 424 ▲
  - Estimate (2022): 425
  - Density: 34.5/sq mi (13.31/km^{2})
- Time zone: UTC-5 (Eastern (EST))
  - Summer (DST): UTC-4 (EDT)
- Zip code: 16611
- Area code: 814
- FIPS code: 42-061-51080
- Local phone exchanges: 669, 832

Morris Township is a township that is located in Huntingdon County, Pennsylvania, United States. The population was 424 at the time of the 2020 census.

== Geography ==
According to the United States Census Bureau, the township has a total area of 12.1 square miles (31.3 km^{2}), all land.

== Demographics ==
Historical population
Census	Pop.	Note	%±
2000	416		—
2010	410		−1.4%
2020	424		3.4%
2022 (est.)	425		0.2%
U.S. Decennial Census

At the 2000 census there were 416 people in 138 households, including 117 families, in the township. The population density was 34.4 inhabitants per square mile (13.3/km^{2}). There were 158 housing units at an average density of 13.1/sq mi (5.0/km^{2}). The racial makeup of the township was 97.60% White, 2.16% from other races, and 0.24% from two or more races. Hispanic or Latino of any race were 2.16%.

There were 138 households, 42.8% had children under the age of 18 living with them, 73.9% were married couples living together, 4.3% had a female householder with no husband present, and 15.2% were non-families. 12.3% of households were made up of individuals, and 4.3% were one person aged 65 or older. The average household size was 3.01 and the average family size was 3.26.

The age distribution was 31.5% under the age of 18, 6.5% from 18 to 24, 28.8% from 25 to 44, 23.8% from 45 to 64, and 9.4% 65 or older. The median age was 36 years. For every 100 females there were 114.4 males. For every 100 females age 18 and over, there were 109.6 males.

The median household income was $38,125 and the median family income was $40,417. Males had a median income of $31,625 versus $22,500 for females. The per capita income for the township was $14,314. About 6.3% of families and 11.7% of the population were below the poverty line, including 17.5% of those under age 18 and 5.7% of those age 65 or over.

== Recreation ==
A small portion of Pennsylvania State Game Lands Number 166 is located on Brush Mountain in the western portion of the township.
