= Warriors Mark Township, Pennsylvania =

Township in Pennsylvania, US

Coordinates: 40°42′30″N 78°06′59″W

- Township
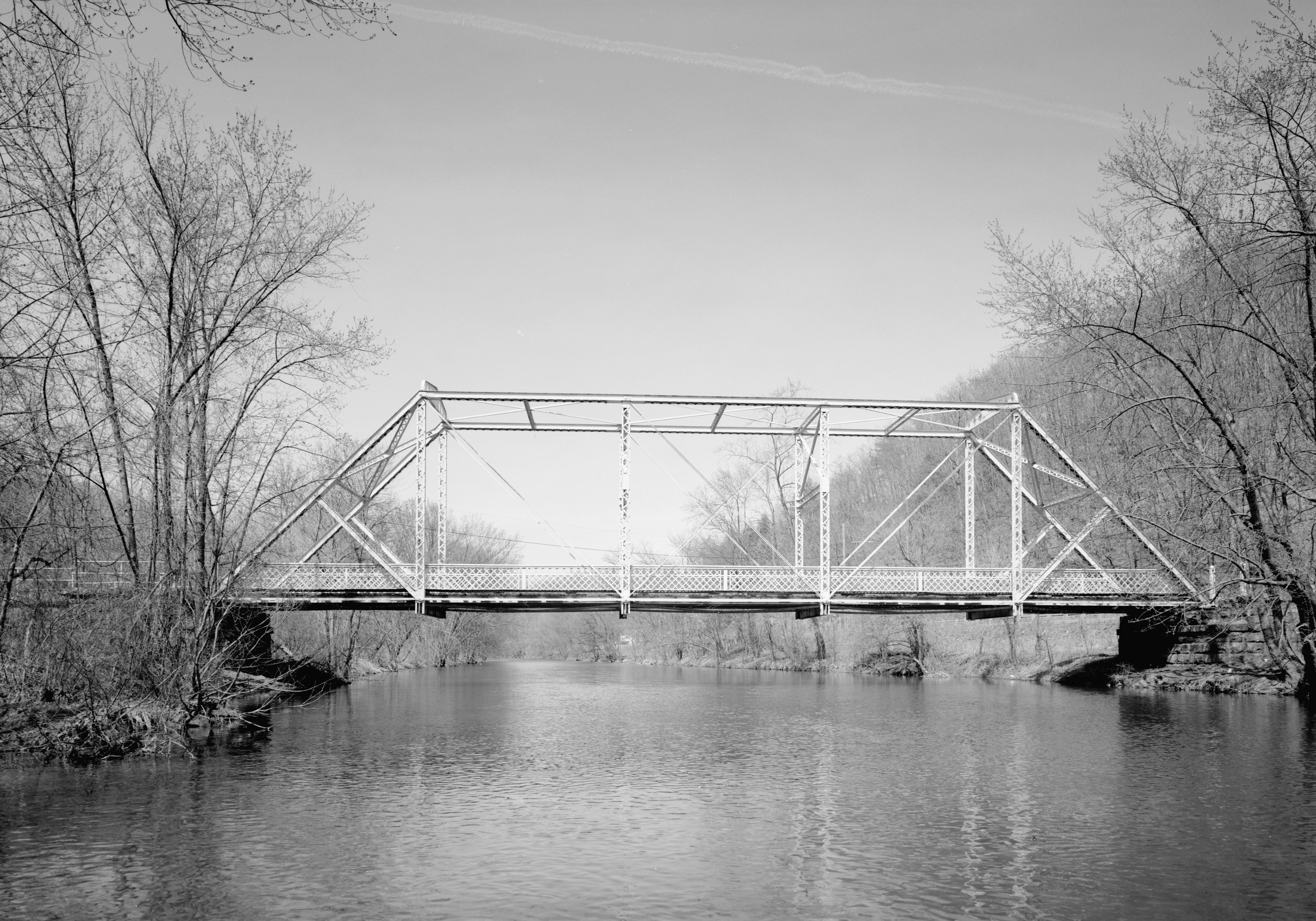
- Birmingham Bridge over the Juniata River

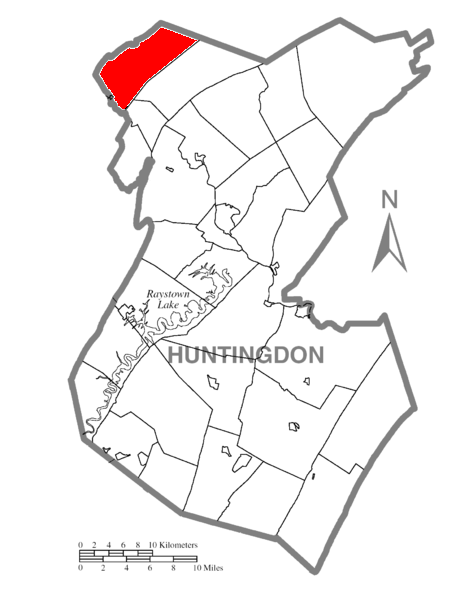
- Map of Huntingdon County, Pennsylvania Highlighting Warriors Mark Township

- Map of Huntingdon County, Pennsylvania
- Country: United States
- State: Pennsylvania
- County: Huntingdon

Area
  - Total: 29.36 sq mi (76.04 km^{2})
  - Land: 29.36 sq mi (76.04 km^{2})
  - Water: 0 sq mi (0.00 km^{2})

Population (2020)
  - Total: 1,871 ▲
  - Density: 62.4/sq mi (24.09/km^{2})
- Time zone: UTC-5 (Eastern (EST))
  - Summer (DST): UTC-4 (EDT)
- Zip code: 16877
- Area code: 814
- FIPS code: 42-061-81104
- Website: https://warriorsmarktwp.com/

Warriors Mark Township is a township in Huntingdon County, Pennsylvania, United States. The population was 1,871 at the 2020 census, a 4.2% increase over the figure tabulated in 2010. It has been named the fastest growing township in Huntingdon County.

== History ==
Warriors Mark Township is about 25 miles northwest of Huntingdon, in Huntingdon County and about 20 miles southwest of State College in Centre County. In 1768 the village of Warriors Mark was founded. Warriors Mark Township was formed in 1798 from Franklin Township. According to tradition, the name Warriors Mark comes from warriors of the Iroquois Federation marking trees midway between the current villages of Warriors Mark and Spring Mount on the Great Indian Warpath.

The area is now experiencing a rapid growth in residential housing due to the expansion of the State College area economy. An Agricultural Security Area was founded in 1989 in the township to protect farmland and covers 8,317 acres.

The Birmingham Bridge was listed on the National Register of Historic Places in 1990.

== Geography ==
According to the United States Census Bureau, the township has a total area of 29.5 square miles (76.4 km^{2}), all land.

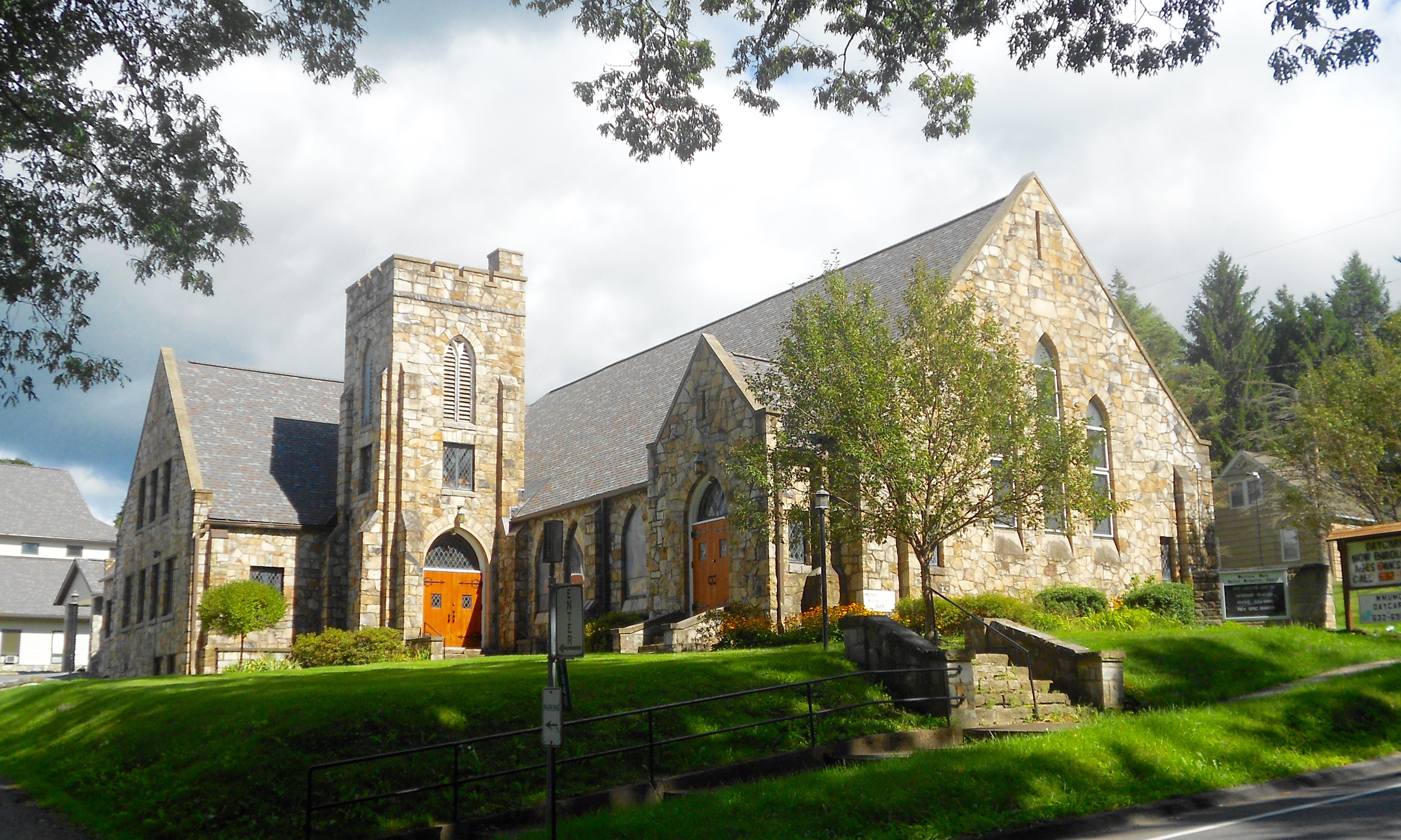
United Methodist Church

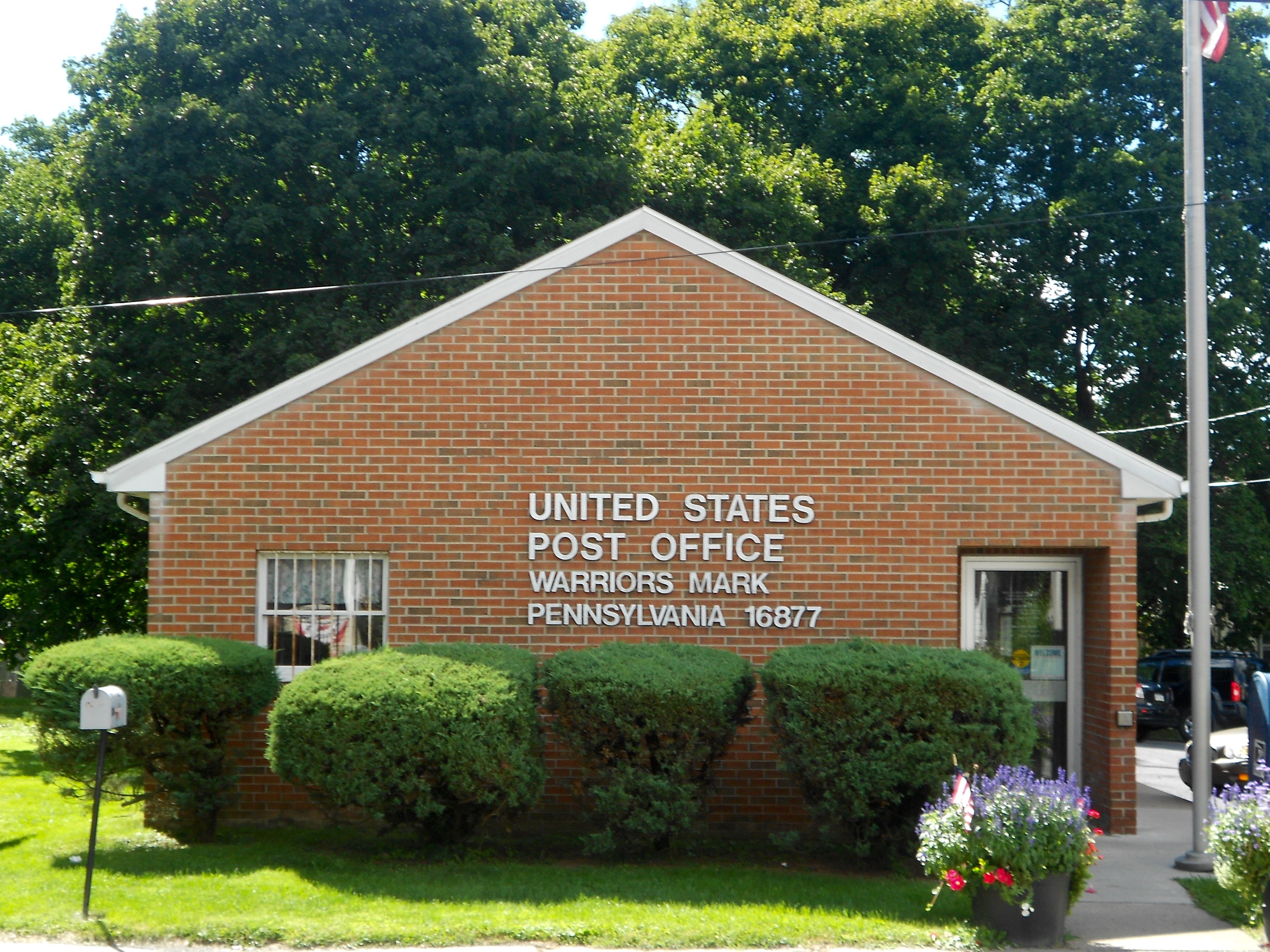
Post office

== Demographics ==
Historical population
Census	Pop.	Note	%±
1990	1,375		—
2000	1,635		18.9%
2010	1,796		9.8%
2020	1,871		4.2%
2022 (est.)	1,862		−0.5%

As of the census of 2010, there were 1,796 people, 701 households, and 529 families residing in the township. The population density was 60.9 inhabitants per square mile (23.5/km^{2}). There were 754 housing units at an average density of 25.6/sq mi (9.9/km^{2}). The racial makeup of the township was 98.9% White, 0.6% Black or African American, and 0.5% from two or more races. Hispanic or Latino of any race were 0.4% of the population.

There were 701 households, out of which 32.7% had children under the age of 18 living with them, 63.9% were married couples living together, 3.6% had a male householder with no wife present, 8.0% had a female householder with no husband present, and 24.5% were non-families. 18.8% of all households were made up of individuals, and 8.9% had someone living alone who was 65 years of age or older. The average household size was 2.56 and the average family size was 2.91.

In the township the population was spread out, with 23.8% under the age of 18, 5.8% from 18 to 24, 24.0% from 25 to 44, 32.7% from 45 to 64, and 13.7% who were 65 years of age or older. The median age was 42 years. For every 100 females there were 96.9 males. For every 100 females age 18 and over, there were 96.6 males.

The median income for a household in the township was $53,472, and the median income for a family was $58,182. The per capita income for the township was $26,181. About 6.2% of families and 8.2% of the population were below the poverty line, including 12.8% of those under age 18 and 10.9% of those age 65 or over.
