= Rock Springs, Pennsylvania =

Unincorporated community in Pennsylvania, US

- Unincorporated community
- Location within the U.S. state of Pennsylvania Rock Springs (the United States)
- Coordinates: 40°42′32.23″N 77°58′3.01″W
- Country: United States
- State: Pennsylvania
- County: Centre
- Township: Ferguson
- Elevation: 1,204 ft (367 m)
- Time zone: UTC-5 (Eastern (EST))
  - Summer (DST): UTC-4 (EDT)
- GNIS feature ID: 1185323

Rock Springs is a hamlet and an unincorporated community in Ferguson Township, Centre County, Pennsylvania, United States. It is part of Happy Valley and the larger Nittany Valley. The hamlet is at the foothills of Tussey Mountain just south of Ramblewood. Pennsylvania Route 45, locally known as Pine Grove Road, runs along Rock Springs.

Rock Springs was first settled in about 1812 by David Mitchell. The hamlet hosts Penn State's Ag Progress Days, the largest outdoor agricultural exposition in Pennsylvania. Rock Springs is also home to the Pasto Agricultural Museum.
