= Baileyville, Pennsylvania =

Census-designated place in Pennsylvania, US

- Census-designated place
- Map showing Centre County in Pennsylvania

- Location in Pennsylvania Baileyville (the United States)
- Coordinates: 40°42′29″N 77°59′5″W
- Country: United States
- State: Pennsylvania
- County: Centre
- Township: Ferguson

Area
  - Total: 1.25 sq mi (3.23 km^{2})
  - Land: 1.24 sq mi (3.22 km^{2})
  - Water: 0.0039 sq mi (0.01 km^{2})
- Elevation: 1,152 ft (351 m)

Population (2020)
  - Total: 217
  - Density: 175/sq mi (67.4/km^{2})
- Time zone: UTC-5 (Eastern (EST))
  - Summer (DST): UTC-4 (EDT)
- FIPS code: 42-03792
- GNIS feature ID: 1168584

Baileyville is a census-designated place in the southern portion of Ferguson Township, Centre County, Pennsylvania. It is part of Happy Valley and the larger Nittany Valley. As of the 2020 census, the population was 217.

The community is located southeast of Marengo, west of Ramblewood on Pennsylvania Route 45, locally known as Pine Grove Road. Baileyville borders Pennsylvania Furnace on the Centre-Hundington County line. The village is in the valley of Spruce Creek, a southwest-flowing tributary of the Little Juniata River.

== History ==
Richard Baily, the village's namesake, came to the area in around 1790. The Bailey family operated a blacksmith shop, carpenter shop, sawmill, and tannery. In the 1890s a schoolhouse was built to serve the community. The school was transformed into a community center in the 1930s.

== Demographics ==
As of the census of 2020, there were 217 people, and 80 households in the CDP. The racial makeup of the CDP was 85.7% White, 0% Black or African American, 0% Native American, 1.8% Asian, 1.3% from other races, and 11.1% from two or more races. Hispanic or Latino of any race were 3.6% of the population.

12.0% of the population lives below the poverty line.

Historical population
Census	Pop.	Note	%±
2020	217		—
U.S. Decennial Census
