= Gatesburg, Pennsylvania =

Unincorporated community in Pennsylvania, US

- Unincorporated community
- Location within the U.S. state of Pennsylvania Gatesburg (the United States)
- Coordinates: 40°44′41.22″N 78°0′18.02″W
- Country: United States
- State: Pennsylvania
- County: Centre
- Township: Ferguson
- Elevation: 1,276 ft (389 m)
- Time zone: UTC-5 (Eastern (EST))
  - Summer (DST): UTC-4 (EDT)
- GNIS feature ID: 1175485

Gatesburg is a village and an unincorporated community in Ferguson Township, Centre County, Pennsylvania, United States. It is part of Happy Valley and the larger Nittany Valley. The village is northwest of a portion of the Gatesburg Ridge, northeast of Marengo, southeast of Stormstown, and southwest of the Scotia Barrens.

Henry Gates laid out the village of Gatesburg, which had iron ore mine in the early nineteenth century that served the Centre Furnace. The village is still home to the Gatesburg Lutheran Church and cemetery, as well as several farms.
