= Lewisburg and Tyrone Railroad =

Railway line in Pennsylvania, United States

Map

The Lewisburg and Tyrone Railroad (later Railway), previously the Lewisburg, Centre and Spruce Creek Railroad, was a subsidiary of the Pennsylvania Railroad (PRR) in central Pennsylvania. Originally intended to connect the Susquehanna Valley with Tyrone and the ore lands to its northeast, it was built in two discontinuous and never-connected pieces, one from Tyrone to Fairbrook and one from Lewisburg to Lemont. These served as lightly trafficked branches of the PRR into the early 20th Century. The line from Tyrone to Fairbrook passed into the hands of the short line Bellefonte Central Railroad in 1927, but the PRR's manipulations ensured its abandonment in 1941. The line between Lewisburg and Lemont was severed in 1970 and was gradually cut further back towards Montandon. Regular service ended on the last remaining part of the line in 1997, and it was abandoned in 2008.

== Lewisburg, Centre and Spruce Creek ==
Lewisburg, Centre and Spruce Creek Railroad
Overview
- Reporting mark: LC&SC
- Locale: Central Pennsylvania
- Dates of operation: 1870–1879
- Successor: Lewisburg and Tyrone Railroad

Technical
- Track gauge: 4 ft 8 1/2 in (1,435 mm) standard gauge

The Lewisburg, Centre and Spruce Creek Railroad was chartered on April 1, 1853, to run westward from the vicinity of Lewisburg, on the west bank of the West Branch Susquehanna River, through the southern valleys of Centre County, Pennsylvania to Spruce Creek, on the main line of the PRR. Its charter was amended on March 3, 1854, allowing it to reach the PRR at Tyrone, a town more industrially developed than Spruce Creek.

Funding was hard to come by, and construction slow in starting. During the mid-1860s, the Atlantic and Great Western Railroad considered building a line to Bellefonte to reach the LC&SC, and then use the LC&SC to reach the Catawissa Railroad. The plan fell through, but it drew the attention of the PRR to a potential competitor.

The railroad was leased to the PRR on July 23, 1869, and it was the PRR that would provide support for construction and operate the railroad. By the next year, the railroad had been opened from Montandon, on the Philadelphia and Erie Railroad east of the Susquehanna, across the river into Lewisburg. In 1871, it was open as far west as Mifflinburg, about 10 miles (16 km) up the Buffalo Valley. The company continued grading west towards Laurelton and did some work on the line east of Tyrone, but the Panic of 1873 slowed construction again. However, by 1877, the railroad had pushed its line through the narrow valley of Penns Creek to Rising Springs (now Spring Mills). The twisting line required two tunnels, through Paddy Mountain and Tunnel Mountain, cutting across loops in the winding course of Penns Creek through the mountains and extending its total length to 43.18 miles (69.49 km). On December 13, 1879, the company defaulted on its bonds, and on December 31, 1879, it was reorganized as the Lewisburg and Tyrone Railroad. The new company was leased to the PRR as well on January 1, 1880.

== Lewisburg and Tyrone ==
Lewisburg & Tyrone Railroad

Overview
- Reporting mark: L&T
- Locale: Central Pennsylvania
- Dates of operation: 1880–1913
- Successor: Lewisburg and Tyrone Railway

Technical
- Track gauge: 4 ft 8 1/2 in (1,435 mm) standard gauge

For the time being, the controlling PRR saw little prospect of traffic from completing the railroad. The projected western division of the Lewisburg and Tyrone, however, had considerable promise. A line east from Tyrone to Scotia and the surrounding iron ore region held great potential, particularly when Andrew Carnegie invested in the Scotia deposits. The new line left the PRR main line just east of Tyrone, in the Brush Mountain narrows of the Little Juniata River, and followed Logan Spring Run north to Eyer. Ambling up the broad valley between Bald Eagle Mountain and Tussey Mountain, it turned southeast at Marengo to pierce Gatesburg Ridge by the gap of Halfmoon Creek, which it followed to Spruce Creek below Pennsylvania Furnace. Running north along Spruce Creek and then the Beaver Branch, it ended in a station near Fairbrook by 1881, 19.9 miles (32.0 km) in all. No further construction in the direction of State College and the eastern division was undertaken, but the Scotia Branch swung through another gap in Gatesburg Ridge and ran another 5.3 miles (8.5 km) to reach the vast ore pits of Scotia. In 1882, another short line of 2.03 miles (3.27 km), the Juniata Branch, was built off of the Scotia Branch just north of Gatesburg Ridge to reach ore pits of the Juniata Mining Company west of Scotia.

The PRR began to extend the Lewisburg and Tyrone again in 1884, laying rail west from Spring Mills along Sinking Creek and then out across Penns Valley to Centre Hall and Oak Hall, from which the new line followed Spring Creek to Lemont. The new line, 14.52 miles (23.37 km) long, was opened in 1885. However, it was not now intended to reach the western division. Instead of connecting Lemont and Fairbrook, the PRR incorporated a new company, the Bellefonte, Nittany and Lemont Railroad, to build a line from Lemont to the PRR-owned Bald Eagle Valley Railroad at Bellefonte. The new line, from Montandon to Bellefonte (and on to Milesburg via the Bald Eagle Valley) became the Bellefonte Branch of the PRR, while the disconnected western division was operated as the Fairbrook Branch.

Several tributary branches were also built from the Lewisburg and Tyrone where it cut through the mountains. In 1880, a short branch was laid along Poe Creek to reach a sawmill at Poe Mills. After the area had been timbered and the sawmill burned, the branch was removed in 1904.

== Later years and abandonment ==
Lewisburg & Tyrone Railway
Overview
- Locale: Central Pennsylvania
- Dates of operation: 1913–1915
- Successor: Pennsylvania Railroad

Technical
- Track gauge: 4 ft 8 1/2 in (1,435 mm) standard gauge

The Lewisburg and Tyrone Railroad continued to operate as a PRR subsidiary. On June 16, 1913, it was again foreclosed on, and reorganized on December 30, 1915 as the Lewisburg and Tyrone Railway. However, in just over a year, on April 30, 1915, it was merged into the PRR. The two divisions continued to operate as the Fairbrook Branch and the Bellefonte Branch. The Juniata Branch was removed before 1920, and the Fairbrook and Scotia Branches were abandoned in 1927. The Bellefonte Central Railroad received permission to take over the Fairbrook Branch, building down from State College along the likely route of the unbuilt middle division of the L&T, but the PRR's manipulation of rate divisions ensured that the Bellefonte Central could not operate the branch except at a loss. It was embargoed in 1933, and rail was removed in 1941–1942, after a long series of unsuccessful legal proceedings by the Bellefonte Central.

Between 1923 and 1945, there was one significant addition to the former Lewisburg and Tyrone line: the Laurelton Branch was built north from Rutherton Station to serve Laurelton State Village, a state home for the intellectually disabled. In 1970, Penn Central abandoned the middle of the Bellefonte Branch from Mifflinburg to Coburn, a section by then bereft of traffic potential. A short section of that has since become the Penns Creek rail trail. Further damage by Hurricane Agnes in 1972 resulted in the abandonment of the line from Lemont to Coburn. The remaining segment, from Montandon to Mifflinburg, was operated by Conrail until 1981. In 1983, Conrail sold it to the West Shore Railroad. In 1988, the West Shore bought part of the old Reading line across the river, including a bridge at Milton and abandoned the now-redundant line from Lewisburg to Montandon. Service ended on the line in 1997, and damage from Hurricane Floyd in 1999 rendered it impassable. Its acquisition for a rail trail in 2008 marked the end of railroading on the Lewisburg and Tyrone. Construction on the Buffalo Valley Rail Trail began in March 2011 and the first phase of construction, from Lewisburg to Mifflinburg, was completed at the end of November 2011. An expansion of the trail east in Lewisburg from 12th Street to 5th Street is dependent on approval by PennDOT for a proposed at-grade signalized crossing of Route 15.
