= Fairbrook Branch =

The Fairbrook Branch was a 20.3-mile (32.7 km) branch of the Pennsylvania Railroad (PRR) in Huntingdon and Centre County, Pennsylvania, opened in 1881 between Tyrone and Fairbrook. It was intended to be the western portion of the Lewisburg and Tyrone Railroad's main line, but the central portion of that railroad from Fairbrook to Lemont was never completed. The Scotia Branch, running 4.8 miles (7.7 km) from Fairbrook to Scotia, and the Juniata Branch, a 2.0-mile (3.2 km) spur from the Scotia Branch, connected it with a series of iron ore mines which formed the main traffic source for the branch. Declining activity at these mines rendered the branch unprofitable after 1906. The PRR disposed of most of the branch west of a limestone quarry at Stover in 1928, selling it to the Bellefonte Central Railroad. However, the PRR would not grant the Bellefonte Central the rate divisions to operate it profitably, and service west of Stover ended in 1933. A small part of the east end of the branch survived into the late 20th Century.

== Construction ==
The Fairbrook Branch was originally conceived as a portion of the Lewisburg, Centre and Spruce Creek Railroad, which was incorporated in 1853 to build from Montandon, Pennsylvania, on the Sunbury and Erie Railroad to Spruce Creek, Pennsylvania, on the Middle Division of the PRR. Its promoters hoped it would furnish an outlet for iron ore, timber, and agricultural products in Centre and Union Counties. However, construction did not begin until after the American Civil War, and the financial support of the PRR soon became necessary. The line was opened from Montandon west to Mifflinburg in 1871, but for the time being went no further; the PRR obtained a charter amendment to change the western terminus to Tyrone but showed little further interest in completing the line. The railroad was reorganized in 1879 as the Lewisburg and Tyrone Railroad, a PRR subsidiary, to shed its construction debt; by this time, seventeen miles of line had been graded on the west end of the line from Tyrone to Pennsylvania Furnace but no rail had been laid. Andrew Carnegie and his partners bought a 500 acres (200 hectares) tract of iron ore lands in Centre County to supply the Edgar Thomson Works. The PRR accordingly completed the west end of the Lewisburg and Tyrone from Tyrone to Fairbrook and built a branch line from Fairbrook to Scotia, Pennsylvania to serve Carnegie's ore mines, opening in 1881.

The PRR completed the east end of the Lewisburg and Tyrone Railroad as far as Lemont, Pennsylvania, which it then connected with Bellefonte via another subsidiary, the Bellefonte, Nittany and Lemont Railroad. The Lewisburg and Tyrone was again reorganized in 1913 as the Lewisburg and Tyrone Railway, which was absorbed into the PRR in 1915. The line from Tyrone to Fairbrook became the PRR's Fairbrook Branch; the remainder of the Lewisburg and Tyrone line from Fairbrook to Lemont was never completed.

== Operational history ==
At the inception of the branch as the Lewisburg and Tyrone Railroad, twice-daily (except Sunday) passenger and freight service was provided (and also extended along the Scotia Branch to Scotia). The iron mines at Scotia were the largest single source of ore traffic, but a spur from the Scotia Branch, the Juniata Branch, tapped a smaller set of ore mines at Tow Hill. Ore from these mines supplied both the Carnegie interests and Robert Hare Powel's blast furnaces in Huntingdon County. An ore pit in Dry Hollow, near Warriors Mark, was operated by the Powel interests from a little before his death in 1883 until about 1893. The eponymous blast furnace at Pennsylvania Furnace made pig iron from local ores, but succumbed to more modern competition in 1888. A large limestone quarry near Stover also generated mineral traffic.

The branch's peak earning year was early in its history, in 1888, bringing in about $34,000. The decline of iron mining and lumbering in the area brought about a falling-off in traffic, and the branch would operate at a loss after 1906. Officials at Penn State lobbied the PRR to complete the Lemont to Fairbrook line to improve the roundabout rail passenger service to State College, but without success. The PRR briefly considered doing so in 1912 in order to bankrupt the Bellefonte Central Railroad to keep it out of the hands of the New York Central, but the latter lost interest in the Bellefonte Central and the PRR accordingly abandoned its own plans.

In 1899, J. Wesley Gephart organized the Bellefonte Furnace Company, which reopened Bellefonte Furnace and bought the Scotia ore lands from Carnegie Steel. Ore briefly moved from Scotia to Bellefonte via the Fairbrook Branch, the Bald Eagle Valley Railroad, and the Bellefonte Central, but the latter soon rebuilt an old branch to Scotia to obtain a much more direct route. Bellefonte Furnace closed at the end of 1910 and ore mining ceased, but timber continued to be harvested in the vicinity of Scotia. This, too, ceased after about a decade, and the Scotia Branch was abandoned on April 28, 1923. Twice-daily mixed service continued to operate from Tyrone to Fairbrook, but very little freight moved along the branch. The area around Warriors Mark generated a little outbound sand, clay, and timber, and the farm country along the branch shipped agricultural products. Farm machinery and animal feed generated most inbound traffic. Service was cut back to once-daily in 1925; passenger traffic fell off sharply now that it was no longer possible to ride to Tyrone and back in a day. The PRR applied to abandon the branch east of the limestone quarry at Stover in 1927. As a result of objections from shippers, the PRR struck a deal wherein it sold the branch east of Stover to the Bellefonte Central, which built a new connection from Fairbrook to its own main line at Struble. The last PRR train to Fairbrook ran on October 28, 1928. The Bellefonte Central obtained trackage rights from Stover to Tyrone, hoping to interchange freight with the PRR there and avoid the circuitous route via Bellefonte. However, the PRR refused to grant rate divisions for interchange at Tyrone that would compensate the Bellefonte Central for the longer haul over its new rails, making that plan uneconomical. As a result, the line east of Stover was abandoned in 1933.

The remainder of the branch was gradually shortened under Penn Central and removed entirely at the formation of Conrail.

== Stations ==
=== Fairbrook Branch ===
Name	Mileage	Notes
Tyrone	0.0	Junction with Middle Division of Main Line
Nealmont, Pennsylvania	1.3	
Weston, later Hamer's Mill	1.6, 1.7	
Stover	2.1	
Hutchinson, later Eyer	4.2, 4.1	
Pennington	5.1	
Warriors Mark	7.5	
Dungarvin	9.8, 9.9	
Furnace Road	11.6	
Marengo	13.3	
Hostler	15.0, 15.1	
Pennsylvania Furnace	16.7, 16.8	
Musser	18.6	
Fairbrook	20.3	junction Scotia Branch; subsequently connected to Bellefonte Central Railroad

=== Scotia Branch ===
Name	Mileage	Notes
Fairbrook	20.3	junction Fairbrook Branch
—	21.8	junction Juniata Branch
Scotia	25.1	

=== Juniata Branch ===
Name	Mileage	Notes
—	21.8	junction Scotia Branch
Juniata Mines	23.8	
