= Ferguson Township, Centre County, Pennsylvania =

Township in Pennsylvania, US

Coordinates: 40°44′00″N 77°56′59″W

- Home rule municipality
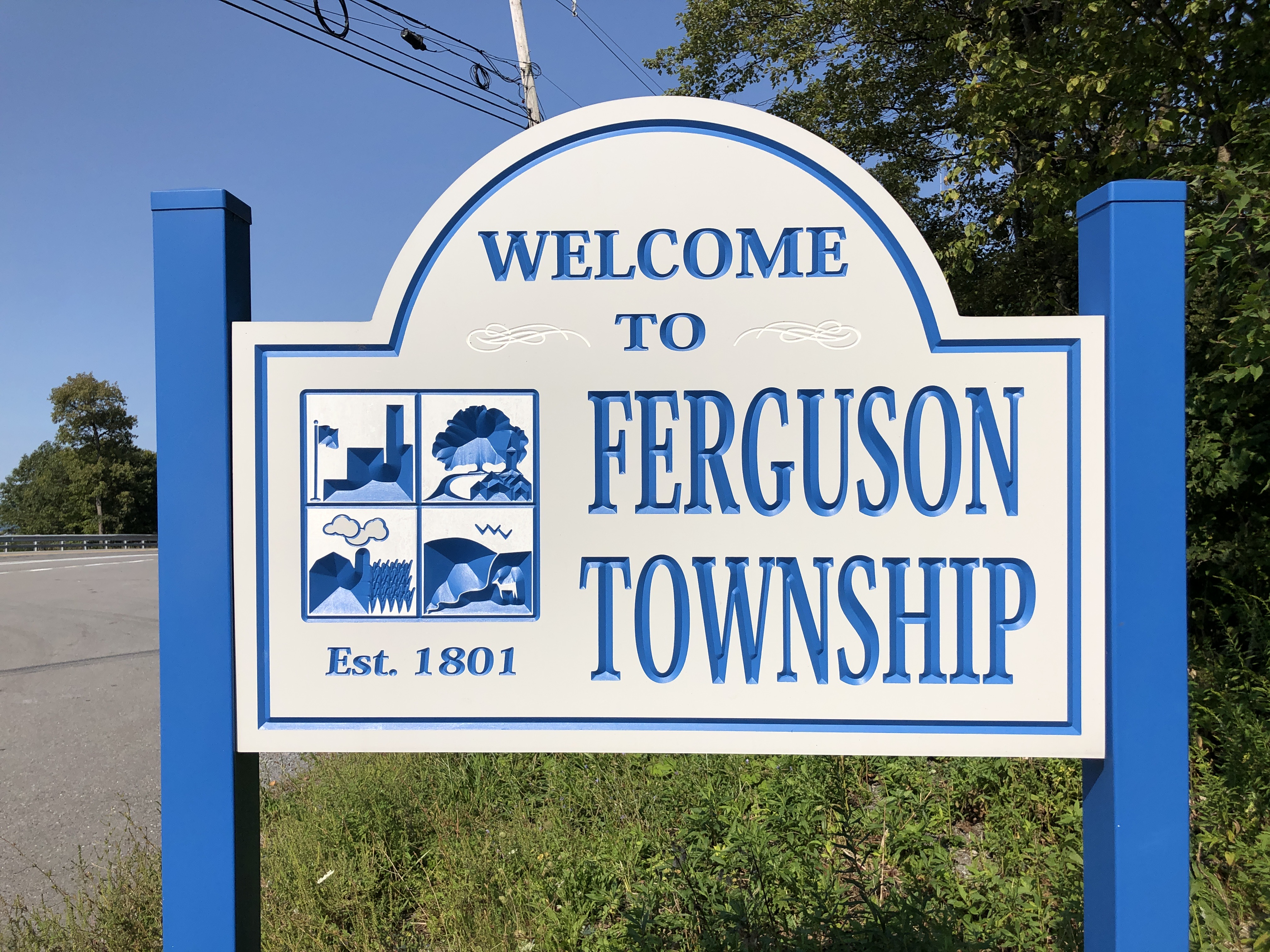
- Welcome sign on Pennsylvania Route 26

- Logo

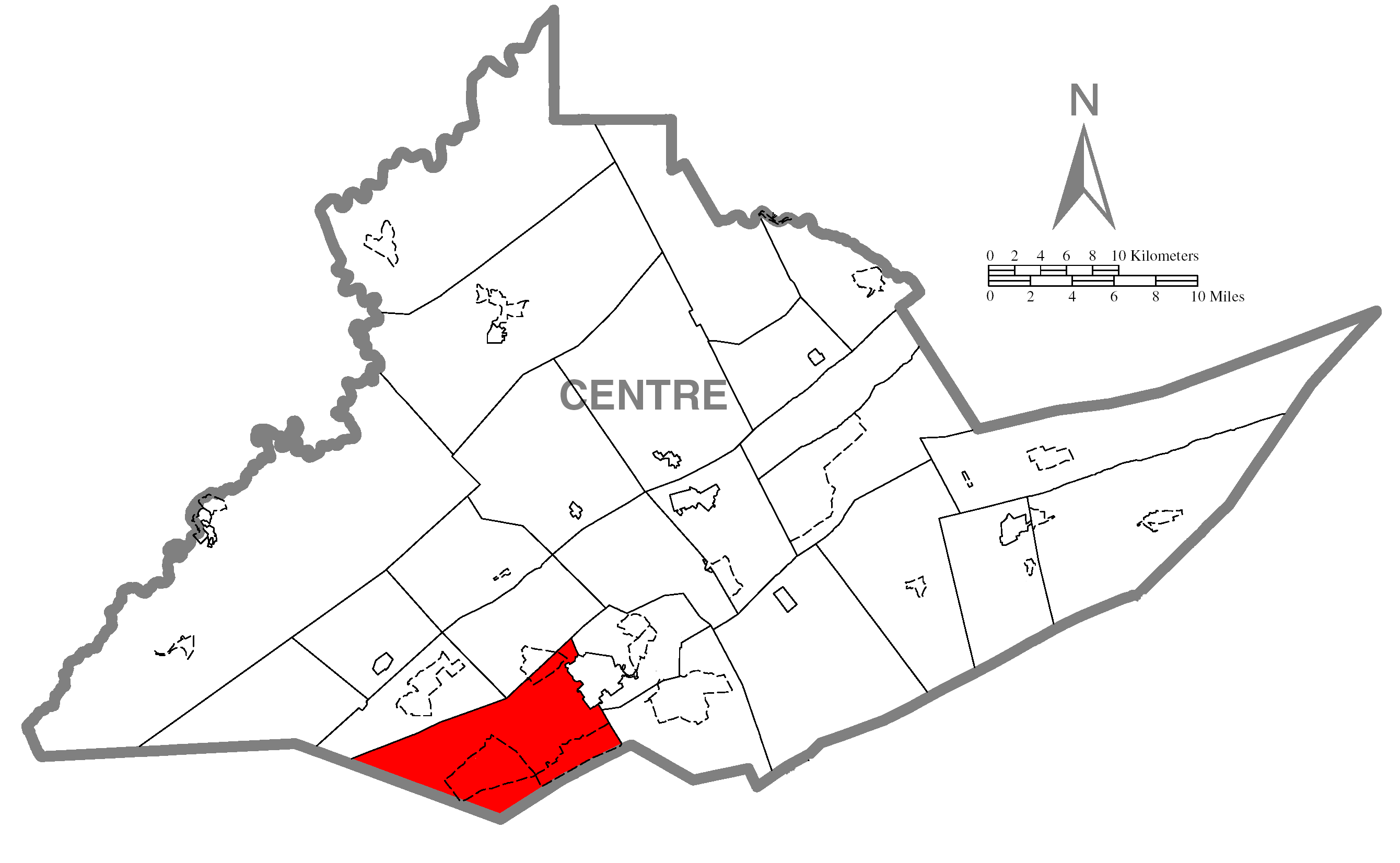
- Map of Centre County, Pennsylvania highlighting Ferguson Township

- Map of Centre County, Pennsylvania
- Country: United States
- State: Pennsylvania
- County: Centre
- Settled: 1791
- Incorporated: 1801

Government
  - Type: Board of Supervisors
  - Chair (Ward II): Jeremie Thompson
  - Vice-Chair (At Large): Omari Patterson
  - Supervisor (At Large): Vacant
  - Supervisor (Ward I): Matthew Heller
  - Supervisor (Ward III): Patricia Stephens

Area
  - Total: 47.70 sq mi (123.55 km^{2})
  - Land: 47.70 sq mi (123.54 km^{2})
  - Water: 0.0039 sq mi (0.01 km^{2})

Population (2020)
  - Total: 19,009
  - Density: 405.7/sq mi (156.64/km^{2})
- Time zone: UTC-5 (EST)
  - Summer (DST): UTC-4 (EDT)
- Zip Codes: 16801, 16803, 16868 (Pine Grove Mills)
- Area codes: 814 and 582
- FIPS code: 42-027-25624
- Website: www.twp.ferguson.pa.us

Ferguson Township is a township with home rule status in Centre County, Pennsylvania, United States. It is part of the State College, Pennsylvania Metropolitan Statistical Area. The population was 19,009 at the 2020 census. Most of the agricultural research for Penn State, based in adjacent State College, Pennsylvania, is taking place at the Russell E. Larson Research Center located in the western part of Ferguson Township. AccuWeather, CATA, and Minitab are all headquartered within the township.

Ferguson Township is served by the Ferguson Township Police Department and the Alpha Fire Company for police and fire protection.

== History ==
In 1801, Ferguson Township formed around a mill at the base of Tussey Mountain. The area around the mill would be known as Pine Grove Mills. Other small villages that were first established in the early nineteenth century include Gatesburg, a mining town, Pattonville, which would later merge with Pine Grove Mills, Rock Springs, and Baileyville.

Ferguson was first connected to the Bellefonte Central Railroad in 1886 with a station in Struble. In 1896 the Pine Grove Mills Extension connected Struble to Bloomsdorf and Pine Grove Mills. The Fairbrook Branch was built in 1930 connecting Struble to Altoona via Fairbrook. The main line into Struble would eventually cease operations in 1976.

The Bucher Ayres Farm was added to the National Register of Historic Places in 1980.

The township adopted a home rule charter in May 1974, effective January 5, 1976, retaining "Township of Ferguson" as its official name. Despite the "Township" designation, Ferguson is no longer governed under the state's Township Code.

== Geography ==
The township has a total area of 47.6 square miles (123.4 km^{2}), all land.

Ferguson Township is bordered by Halfmoon Township and Patton townships to the northwest, the borough of State College and College Township to the northeast, Harris Township to the east and Huntingdon County to the south.

=== Neighborhoods ===
- Baileyville (census-designated place)
- Cato
- Gatesburg
- Marengo
- Pine Grove Mills (census-designated place)
- Fairbrook
- Pine Hall
- Park Forest Village (census-designated place)
- Ramblewood (census-designated place)
- Rock Springs
- Struble
- Overlook Heights

== Demographics ==
Historical population
Census	Pop.	Note	%±
1850	1,601		—
1860	1,784		11.4%
1870	2,111		18.3%
1880	1,817		−13.9%
1890	1,748		−3.8%
1900	1,512		−13.5%
1910	1,558		3.0%
1920	1,639		5.2%
1930	1,549		−5.5%
1940	1,936		25.0%
1950	2,388		23.3%
1960	3,832		60.5%
1970	6,351		65.7%
1980	8,105		27.6%
1990	9,368		15.6%
2000	14,063		50.1%
2010	17,690		25.8%
2020	19,009		7.5%
U.S. Decennial Census

As of the census of 2020, there were 19,009 people, and 8,057 households residing in the township. The population density was 398.5 inhabitants per square mile (153.9/km^{2}). The racial makeup of the township was 76.0% White, 3.5% Black or African American, 0.1% Native American, 13.4% Asian, 1.4% from other races, and 6.4% from two or more races. Hispanics or Latinos of any race were 3.5% of the population.

There were 8,057 households, out of which 18.6% had children under the age of 18 living with them, 49% were married couples living together, 23.6% had a male householder with no wife present, 23.2% had a female householder with no husband present. 26.2% of households had someone 65 years of age or older. The average household size was 2.35 and the average family size was 2.79.

The age distribution was 14.6% under 18, and 16.5% who were 65 or older. 50.5% identified as female.

The median income for a household in the township was $57,459, and the median income for a family was $78,305. The per capita income for the township was $47,001. 17.6% of the population lived in poverty.

66.1% had a bachelor's degree or higher. 19.2% spoke a language other than English at home, the most common of being Asian and Pacific Islander languages (11%). 15.1% of the populations foreign born, roughly a third of whom are naturalized U.S. citizens. 3.9% of the population are veterans.

=== Asian community ===
Asians are the largest minority in Ferguson. The township has officially recognized Lunar New Year, Filipino-American Heritage Month, and Asian American and Pacific Islander Heritage Month. Ferguson Township is home to three Asian supermarkets, and a handful of Asian Restaurants. Approximately 577 out of 2,879 foreign born residents are of Asian descent, and Asian and Pacific Islander languages are the most common kind of languages spoken at home in the township at 11%. Young Scholars of Central Pennsylvania, a charter school in Westway, teaches Chinese and Spanish to all students from kindergarten through eighth grade.

The largest Asian ethnic groups in Ferguson are Chinese (1,614), Korean (288), Kazakh (187), Filipino (148), Indian (115), Japanese (88), Cambodian (44), Mongolian (35), and Bangladeshi (26).

== Government ==
The Township of Ferguson is governed by a five-member Board of Supervisors with two serving at-large and three serving by ward. Supervisors each serve four-year terms for a maximum of two-terms before a minimum two-year break. The Supervisors are chosen by plurality elections every two years alternating between at-large and ward elections.

The Township of Ferguson is represented in the Pennsylvania General Assembly by Senate, District 35 and House District 77. Federally, the Township of Ferguson is part of Pennsylvania's 15th congressional district.

== Transportation ==
The Centre Area Transportation Authority is headquartered in Ferguson Township in Cato Park. CATA provides local bus service with fixed routes between Ferguson and the borough of State College as well as College, and Patton Township.

Ferguson Township was first connected to the main line of the Bellefonte Central Railroad in 1886 at Struble. In 1892 an extension connected State College from Struble. In 1896 an extension was built to Pine Grove Mills via Bloomsdorf from Struble. The Fairbrook Branch was finished in 1930 connecting Struble to Tyrone via Fairbrook and Warriors Mark.

Pennsylvania Route 45 runs through Ferguson Townships past the communities of Baileyville, Rock Springs, Ramblewood, Fairbrook, and Pine Grove Mills before entering Harris Township at Shingletown. Pennsylvania Route 26 enters Ferguson at Tussey Mountain following Slab Cabin Run before passing through Pine Grove Mills, Bloomsdorf, Cato, Pine Hall, and Struble before entering the West End neighborhood of State College. U.S. Route 322 Business briefly passes through Ferguson Township along Park Forest, Overlook Heights, and Cherrytown.

Ferguson Township was once the home of the State College Air Depot in Pine Hall.
