= Pine Grove Mills, Pennsylvania =

Unincorporated community in Pennsylvania, US

- Census-designated place
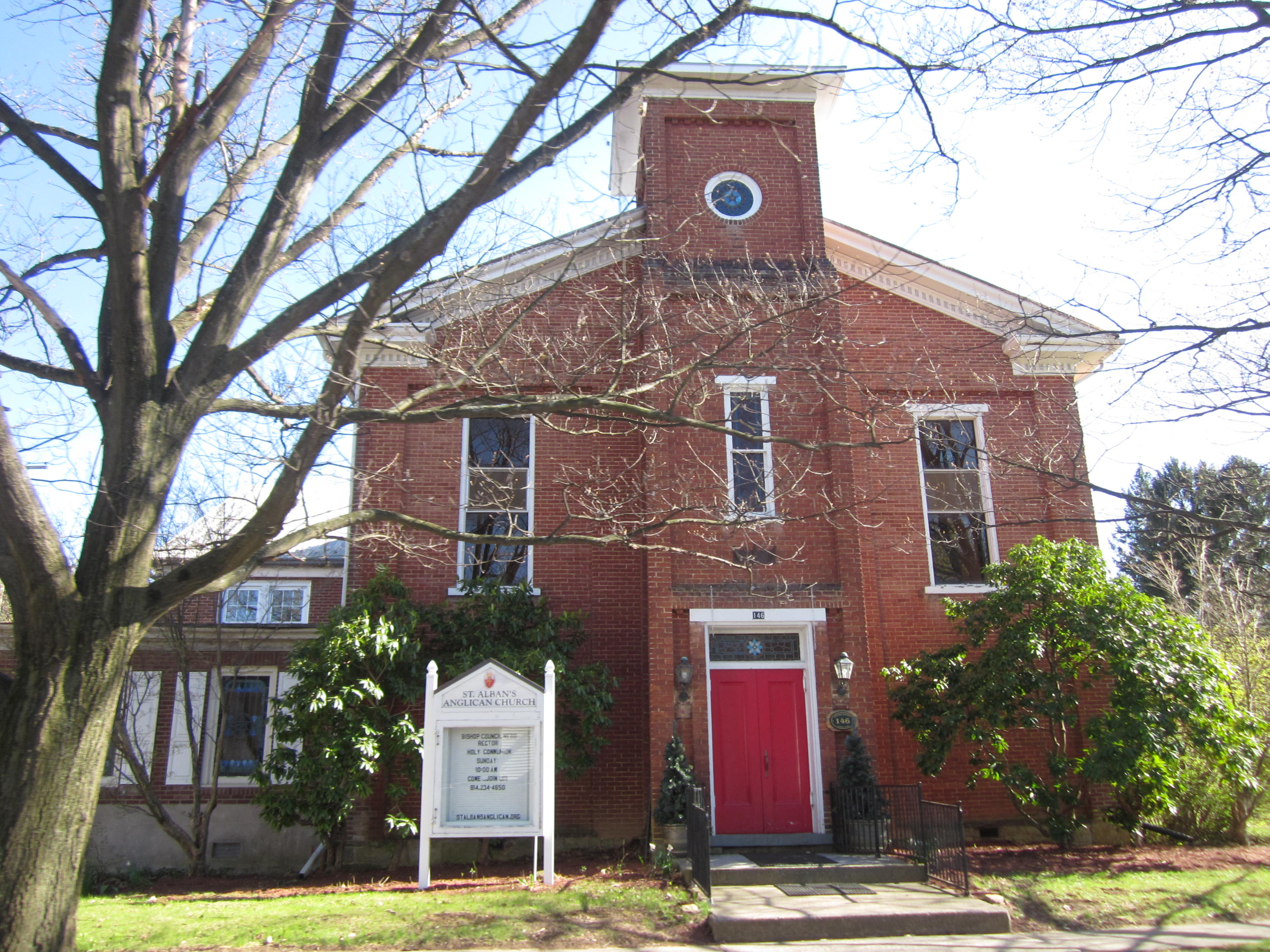
- St. Alban's Anglican Church in the village
- Motto: Proud of our past! Planning our Future!
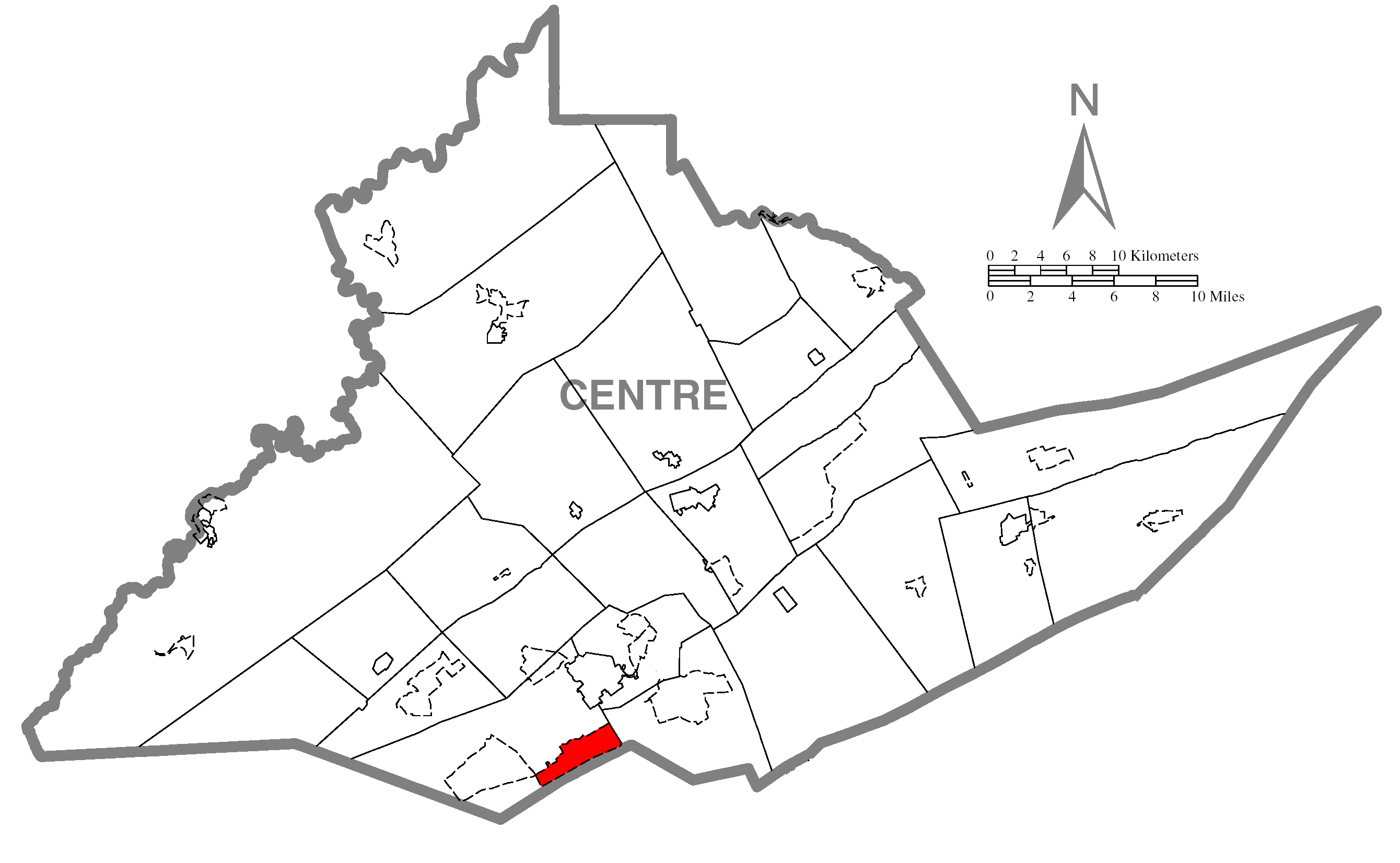
- Location within Centre County

- Location within the U.S. state of Pennsylvania Pine Grove Mills (the United States)
- Coordinates: 40°44′7″N 77°53′3″W
- Country: United States
- State: Pennsylvania
- County: Centre
- Township: Ferguson

Area
  - Total: 2.51 sq mi (6.49 km^{2})
  - Land: 2.51 sq mi (6.49 km^{2})
  - Water: 0 sq mi (0.00 km^{2})
- Elevation: 1,300 ft (400 m)

Population (2020)
  - Total: 1,481
  - Density: 591.4/sq mi (228.36/km^{2})
- Time zone: UTC-5 (Eastern (EST))
  - Summer (DST): UTC-4 (EDT)
- ZIP code: 16868, 16801, 16865
- Area code: 814
- FIPS code: 42-60496
- GNIS feature ID: 1183816

Pine Grove Mills is an unincorporated community, village, and census-designated place (CDP) in Ferguson Township, Centre County, Pennsylvania, United States. It is part of the State College, Pennsylvania Metropolitan Statistical Area. The population was 1,481 at the 2020 census.

== Geography ==
Pine Grove Mills is located in southern Centre County at 40°44′7″N 77°53′3″W (40.735391, -77.884043), near the southern border of Ferguson Township, which is the Centre County/Huntingdon County line. The town is in the Nittany Valley at the base of Tussey Mountain (often called Pine Grove Mountain by residents), a long ridge that in part forms the southern edge of the valley.

According to the United States Census Bureau, the CDP has a total area of 2.51 square miles (6.49 km^{2}), all land.

Pine Grove Mills is 5 miles (8 km) south of State College at the intersection of State Highways 26 and 45. PA 26 turns south to cross Tussey Mountain into Huntingdon County, while PA 45 continues southwest in the valley, also entering Huntingdon County.

== Demographics ==
Historical population
| Census | Pop. | Note | %± |
|---|---|---|---|
| 1980 | 1,030 | | — |
| 1990 | 1,129 | | 9.6% |
| 2000 | 1,141 | | 1.1% |
| 2010 | 1,502 | | 31.6% |
| 2020 | 1,481 | | −1.4% |
U.S. Decennial Census

As of the census of 2010, there were 1,502 people, 595 households, and 403 families residing in the CDP. The population density was 353.7 inhabitants per square mile (136.6/km^{2}). There were 639 housing units at an average density of 150.5/sq mi (58.1/km^{2}). The racial makeup of the CDP was 93.9% White, 1.9% Black or African American, 0.1% Native American, 2.0% Asian, 0.2% from other races, and 1.9% from two or more races. Hispanic or Latino of any race were 2.1% of the population.

There were 595 households, out of which 34.1% had children under the age of 18 living with them, 58.8% were married couples living together, 2.9% had a male householder with no wife present, 6.1% had a female householder with no husband present, and 32.2% were non-families. 25.5% of all households were made up of individuals, and 9.5% had someone living alone who was 65 years of age or older. The average household size was 2.52 and the average family size was 3.10.

In the CDP, the population was spread out, with 25.8% under the age of 18, 8.5% from 18 to 24, 25.6% from 25 to 44, 26.5% from 45 to 64, and 13.6% who were 65 years of age or older. The median age was 39 years. For every 100 females, there were 95.8 males. For every 100 females age 18 and over, there were 94.3 males.

The median income for a household in the CDP was $45,708, and the median income for a family was $58,750. The per capita income for the CDP was $27,494. None of the families and 3.1% of the population were living below the poverty line, including no under eighteens and 5.0% of those over 65.

== History ==
Thomas Ferguson, who, in 1791, bought 321 acres (1.30 km^{2}) of land for 300 pounds in gold and silver coins, is credited with founding Pine Grove Mills. In 1800, he dammed Slab Cabin Run and built the first of the mills that would eventually give the town its name. According to local tradition, a grove of pine trees separating the sawmill from the gristmill along the run provided the rest of the name.

John Patton Jr., son of Centre Furnace ironmaster Col. John Patton, laid out the town of Pattonville at the east end of Pine Grove Mills in 1815, and the entire village went by Pattonville for a time.

The post office, founded in 1809, was continually known as the Pine Grove Mills post office, however, and the town eventually reverted to the original name.

The village celebrated its bicentennial in 2001. This included the publication of a book.

In June 2018, a farmers market began in the parking lot of St Paul Lutheran Church.

Beginning in 2018, the Centre Region Planning Agency, a department of the Centre Region Council of Governments, led the development of a small area plan alongside residents and Ferguson Township staff. On November 4, 2019, the Ferguson Township Board of Supervisors approved and adopted the plan. Early in 2020, the Board of Supervisors voted to create a standing committee to provide advice and recommendations on the implementation of the plan.
