= Pine Hall, Pennsylvania =

Unincorporated community in Pennsylvania, US

- Unincorporated community
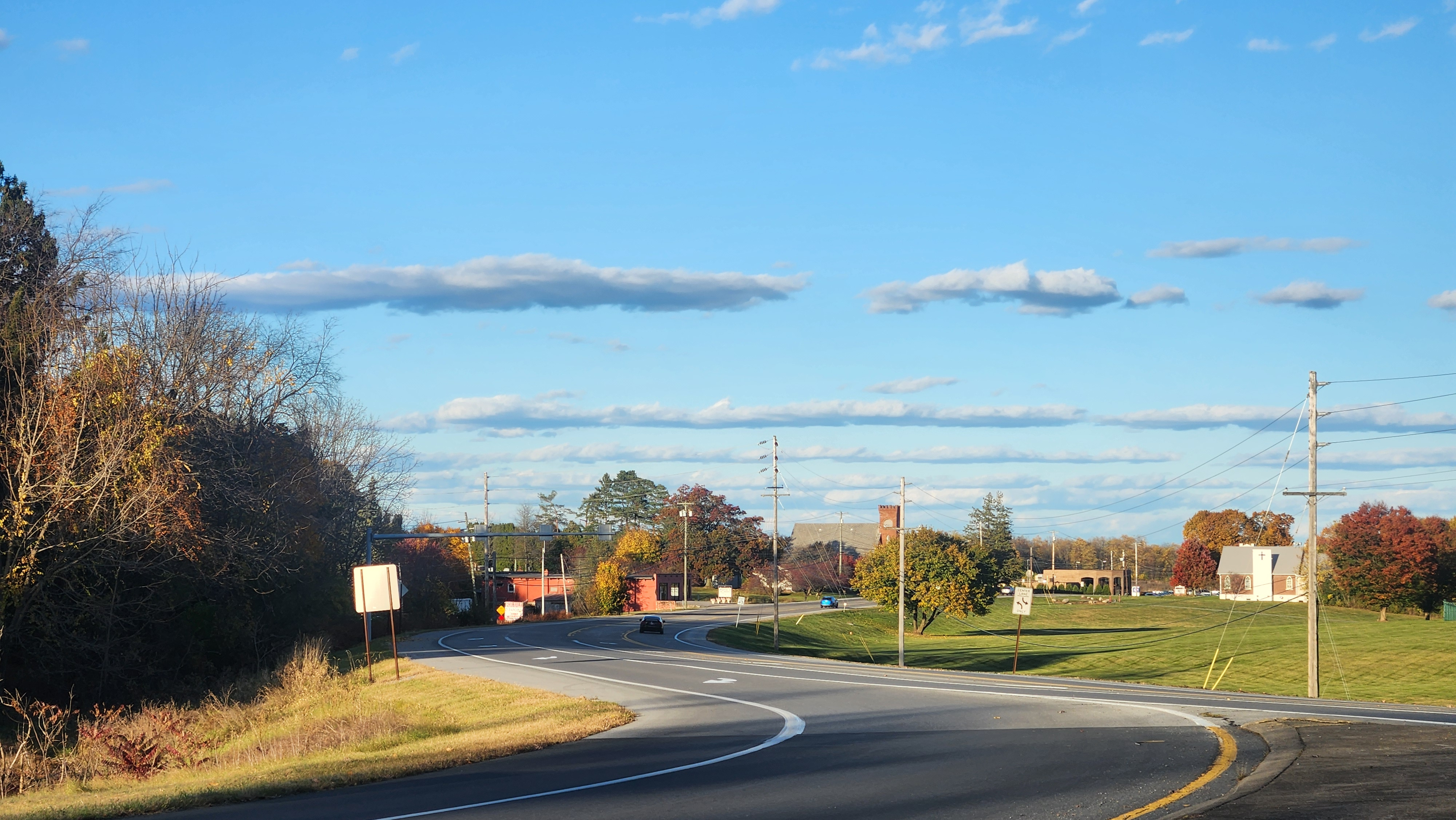
- View of Pine Hall from West College Avenue

- Location within the U.S. state of Pennsylvania Pine Hall (the United States)
- Coordinates: 40°46′34.22″N 77°53′6.01″W
- Country: United States
- State: Pennsylvania
- County: Centre
- Township: Ferguson
- Time zone: UTC-5 (Eastern (EST))
  - Summer (DST): UTC-4 (EDT)
- ZIP code: 16801 and 16803
- GNIS feature ID: 1183820

Pine Hall is a neighborhood and an unincorporated community in Ferguson Township, Centre County, Pennsylvania, United States. It is part of Happy Valley and the larger Nittany Valley. The neighborhood is to the west of Struble.

The Pine Hall forest is home to about 30,000 trees including black cherry, maple, oak, and white pines.

== Transportation ==
Pennsylvania Route 26, locally known as West College Avenue, passes through Pine Hall.

Pine Hall was the home of the State College Air Depot from 1946 to 1987.
