= Ramblewood, Pennsylvania =

Unincorporated community in Pennsylvania, US

- Census-designated place
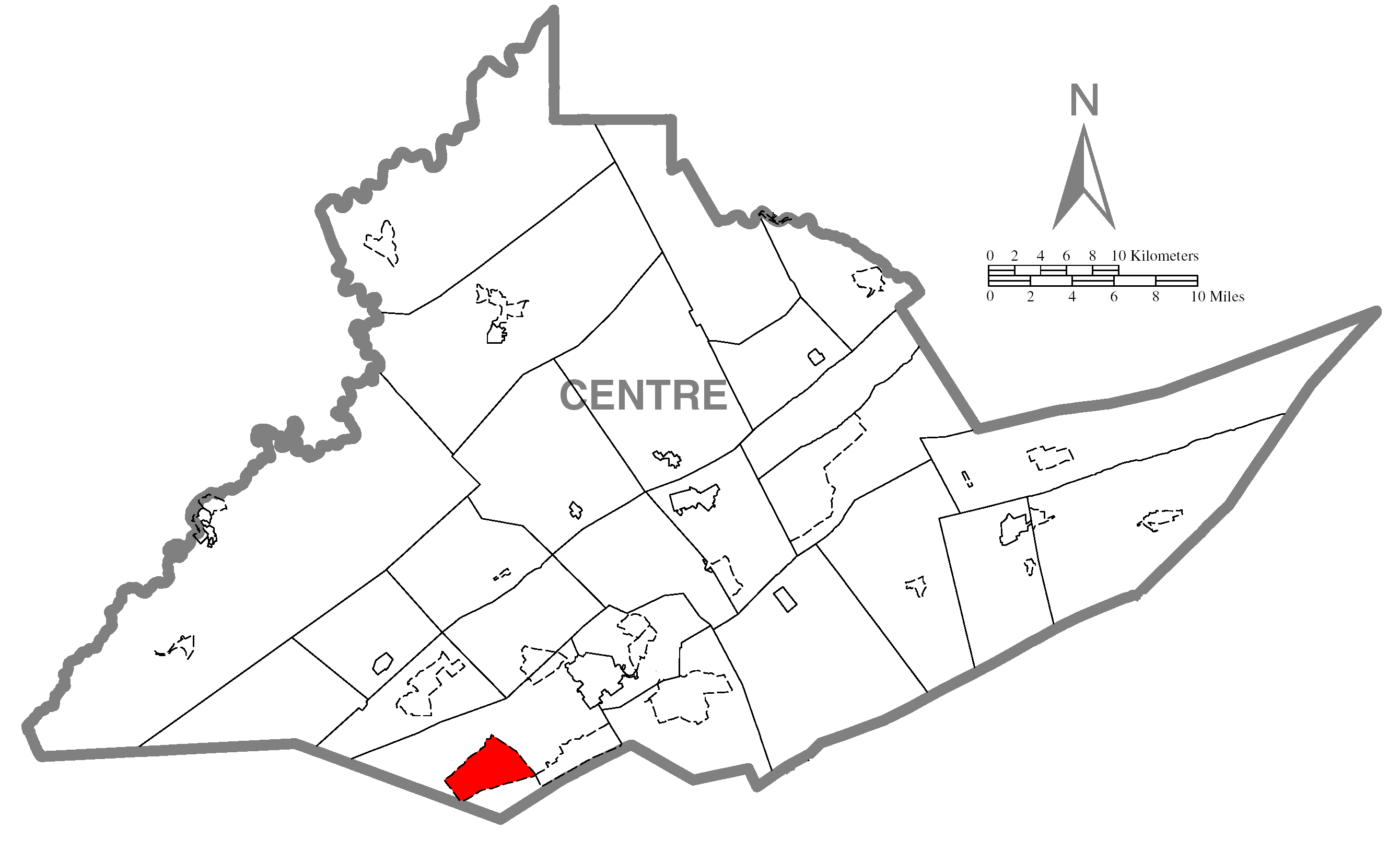
- Location within Centre County

- Location within the U.S. state of Pennsylvania Ramblewood (the United States)
- Coordinates: 40°44′3″N 77°56′40″W
- Country: United States
- State: Pennsylvania
- County: Centre
- Township: Ferguson

Area
  - Total: 3.10 sq mi (8.03 km^{2})
  - Land: 3.10 sq mi (8.03 km^{2})
  - Water: 0 sq mi (0.00 km^{2})
- Elevation: 1,240 ft (380 m)

Population (2020)
  - Total: 769
  - Density: 248/sq mi (95.8/km^{2})
- Time zone: UTC-5 (Eastern (EST))
  - Summer (DST): UTC-4 (EDT)
- ZIP code: 16865
- Area code: 814
- FIPS code: 42-63349
- GNIS code: 1867506

Ramblewood is an unincorporated area and census-designated place (CDP) in Ferguson Township, Centre County, Pennsylvania, United States. It is part of Happy Valley and the larger Nittany Valley. The population was 849 at the 2010 census. The area was formerly known as Fairbrook.

== History ==
In 1887, a post office was established under the name Fairbrook near the Tadpole School in Ferguson Township. Fairbrook was the last station on the western half of the Lewisburg and Tyrone Railroad, subsequently the Fairbrook Branch of the Pennsylvania Railroad. In 1929, the Bellefonte Central Railroad built a five-mile extension from Struble to Fairbrook, and acquired the line from Fairbrook to Stover. The line was shut down at the beginning of the Great Depression in 1933.

Ramblewood first appeared on the United States census as a census-designated place in 2000 with a population of 983. The name Fairbrook is still retained for a 29-acre park.

== Geography ==
Ramblewood is located in southern Centre County at 40°44′3″N 77°56′40″W (40.734180, -77.944554), south of the center of Ferguson Township. It consists of an area of farmland and several small residential developments. Pennsylvania Route 45 forms the southern edge of the community, leading northeast 8 miles (13 km) to the borough of State College.

According to the United States Census Bureau, the CDP has a total area of 3.10 square miles (8.03 km^{2}), all land.

== Demographics ==
Historical population
Census	Pop.	Note	%±
2000	983		—
2010	849		−13.6%
2020	769		−9.4%
U.S. Decennial Census

At the 2010 census, there were 849 people, 311 households and 243 families residing in the CDP. The population density was 127.8 inhabitants per square mile (49.3/km^{2}). There were 319 housing units at an average density of 48.0/sq mi (18.5/km^{2}). The racial makeup of the CDP was 96.7% White, 1.1% Asian, 0.8% from other races, and 1.4% from two or more races. Hispanic or Latino of any race were 2.9% of the population.

There were 311 households, of which 33.4% had children under the age of 18 living with them, 70.7% were married couples living together, 1.6% had a male householder with no wife present, 5.8% had a female householder with no husband present, and 21.9% were non-families. 17.4% of all households were made up of individuals, and 7.4% had someone living alone who was 65 years of age or older. The average household size was 2.73 and the average family size was 3.10.

24.6% of the population were under the age of 18, 5.6% from 18 to 24, 24.4% from 25 to 44, 32.7% from 45 to 64, and 12.7% who were 65 years of age or older. The median age was 43 years. For every 100 females, there were 91.6 males. For every 100 females age 18 and over, there were 90.5 males.

The median household income was $54,464 and the median family income was $60,250. The per capita income for the CDP was $29,996. About 4.5% of families and 5.7% of the population were below the poverty line.
