= Cato, Pennsylvania =

Unincorporated community in Pennsylvania, US

- Unincorporated community
- Location within the U.S. state of Pennsylvania Cato Park (the United States)
- Coordinates: 40°45′51.9″N 77°52′40.5″W
- Country: United States
- State: Pennsylvania
- County: Centre
- Township: Ferguson
- Time zone: UTC-5 (Eastern (EST))
  - Summer (DST): UTC-4 (EDT)
- ZIP code: 16801

Cato (also Cato Park) is a neighborhood, an unincorporated community, and an office park in Ferguson Township, Centre County, Pennsylvania, United States. It is part of Happy Valley and the larger Nittany Valley.

== Offices and Businesses ==
Cato is home to several offices, restaurants, and businesses including the Ferguson Township Municipal Building, Ferguson Township Police Department, Centre Area Transportation Authority, and multiple buildings belonging to the Pennsylvania State University including the Cato Park Library Annex, and two facilities belonging to the Department of Defense funded Applied Research Laboratory.

== Transportation ==
Cato Park is served by the College Avenue Connector operated by CATA.

Pennsylvania Route 26 passes along Cato.

Cato is connected to Orchard Park via the CATO/Stonebridge Bikeway and Haymarket Park via the Bristol Avenue Path. The neighborhood also has an unprotected bike lane along Whitehall Rd.
