= Indian Caverns =

Cave in Pennsylvania, United States

Coordinates: 40.6455°N 78.0904°W

- Interactive map of Indian Caverns
- Location: 5386 Indian Traill; Spruce Creek, Huntington County, Pennsylvania
- Show cave opened: 1929

Indian Caverns was a show cave in Spruce Creek, Pennsylvania, open to the public between 1929 and 2016. Located beneath a foothill of Tussey Mountain and Spruce Creek, it was the second largest commercial show cave in the state. The cavern was known for geological formations including its two-story flowstone and large rimstone pool. With a collection of Native American artifacts on display, tours of the show cave provided information about local indigenous history as well as folklore about bandits and lost treasures.

== Geology ==
It is a horizontal karst cave of Ordovician Nealmont/Benner limestone, estimated to be about 500,000 years old. It is the second-largest cavern in Pennsylvania and the largest limestone cave.

Indian Caverns consists of two sections, originally separated by a 14-foot wall: the "Historic Cave" and the "Giant's Hall". The "historic" part of the cave is generally low-ceilinged and closer to the surface (as shallow as 15 ft) with a couple of wide rooms and extensive speleothem formation.

The Giant's Hall area consists of several large passageways, up to 60 feet high, but with fewer speleothems - though it does include the largest sheet of flowstone in the northeast and a substantial rimstone pool. The lowest point of the cave is approximately 140 feet beneath the surface and the cave temperature is a constant 56 degrees Fahrenheit (13 degrees Celsius).

One room, the "Grotto of the Wah-Wah-Taysee", features a phosphorescent mineral deposit in the ceiling and walls. It was originally thought to be radium, but has since been identified as zinc sulfide reacting with calcite in the limestone. The cave also contains a "musical rock", which resounds with a bell-like tone when struck.

== History ==
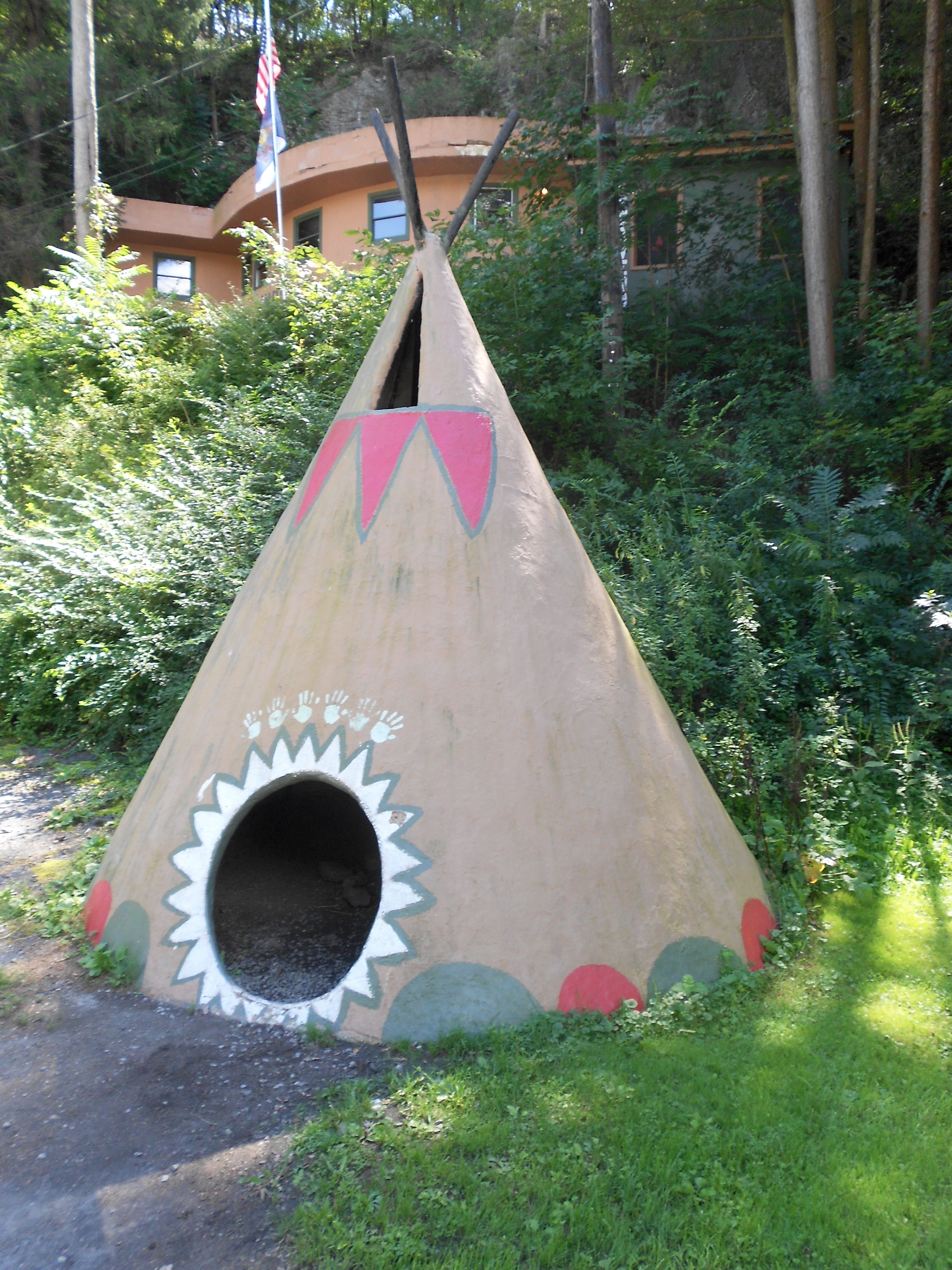
Concrete teepee in front of the cave

Artifacts found in the cave indicate that it was inhabited as long ago as 8000 BC. The earliest tribe known to have used the cave were the Susquehannocks, circa 1600 AD. It was later used by Algonkian (including Lenni Lenape) and Iroquois (probably Mohawk) tribes through the early eighteenth century. Examples of the artifacts that were on display in the cave and include arrow and spearheads, tobacco pipes, tomahawks, punches, banner stones, a bone flute, and pottery shards. They also include a rare effigy of the Algonkian guardian spirit, Mesingw.

Indian Caverns was known about by European settlers from the late eighteenth century. From about 1816, it was one of several caves used as a hideout by the outlaw David Lewis until his death in 1820.

== Operation ==
The entrance and grounds were bought in 1928 by Harold Aden Wertz, Sr., a local entrepreneur. It was opened to the public on June 14, 1929, four months before the stock market crash.

Wertz opened the cave after two years of excavation and about half a million dollars' worth of investments. Wertz, along with his family, moved to Florida during the great depression, but returned each summer to run and upkeep the caves. Before the Indian relics were found inside the first few chambers in the caverns, the cave was planned to be called "Franklin Cave", but it seemed more appropriate to be called "Historic Indian Cave".

Then in the late 1930s - early 1940s the name was changed to "Indian Caverns". It was a popular destination during the Early Auto Era due to the Edwardian fascination with the "wonders" of nature and remained in continuous operation until 2016.

The Indian Caverns were later operated by Aden Wertz, the grandson of the founder, who grew up in a stone cottage at the site and gave tours since the age of 10.

== Closure ==
In 2017, the Western Pennsylvania Conservancy purchased the property to use the cave as a bat sanctuary.
