= Bellefonte Central Railroad =

Shortline railroad connecting Bellefonte and State College, Pennsylvania

The Bellefonte Central Railroad (reporting mark BFC) was a shortline connecting Bellefonte and State College, Pennsylvania. Constructed in the late 19th century to haul local iron ore to furnaces in the Bellefonte region, it later hauled freight traffic to Penn State and lime for steelmaking from local quarries. The line to State College was abandoned in 1974, and most of the remaining railroad in 1984, but a small portion is still used by the Nittany and Bald Eagle Railroad.

== History ==
=== Predecessors ===
The railroad was originally incorporated on September 21, 1882, as the Bellefonte and Buffalo Run Railroad. The purpose of this line was to connect Bellefonte with Pennsylvania State College, and to tap the iron ore deposits along Buffalo Run. This would replace the inefficient wagons used to haul ore to the iron furnaces at Bellefonte. The local iron and agricultural interests who chartered the road contracted out construction to Frank McLaughlin, a Philadelphia businessman, in exchange for a majority of the stock; he turned construction over to his business associates, the Collins brothers. Experienced contractors, they were working at the time on the Beech Creek Railroad, and began grading the Bellefonte & Buffalo Run in March 1883. However, the Bellefonte & Buffalo Run was graded to minimal standards of engineering, with little earthmoving and many curves.

In the meantime, McLaughlin and others chartered the Nittany Valley and Southern Railroad in January 1883. This line was proposed to run from Bellefonte to Mill Hall, providing a connection with the Beech Creek Railroad. (The Bellefonte & Buffalo Run's only connection in Bellefonte was the Pennsylvania Railroad.) However, capital was not forthcoming, and construction of the Bellefonte & Buffalo Run ended with the completion of the grading from Bellefonte to Struble in June 1883. This grade followed Buffalo Run from Bellefonte to Waddle, where a horseshoe curve carried it across and out of the valley and it climbed eastward to the summit at Alto. From there it descended to the iron ore pits at Struble.

Buffalo Run, Bellefonte and Bald Eagle Railroad
Overview
- Headquarters: Bellefonte
- Locale: Centre County, Pennsylvania
- Dates of operation: 1887–1892
- Successor: Bellefonte Central Railroad

Technical
- Track gauge: 4 ft 8 1/2 in (1,435 mm) standard gauge

The Bellefonte & Buffalo Run and Nittany Valley & Southern were merged on March 16, 1885, to form the Buffalo Run, Bellefonte and Bald Eagle Railroad, under the presidency of James A. Beaver. The new company began to lay rail on the grade in April 1886, and began shipping ore from Lambourn Bank (near Waddle) to the McCoy & Linn furnace in Bellefonte in January 1887. The Collins brothers also invested in local ore banks, including those at Red Bank. This was reached by a branch from Mattern Junction, on the horseshoe curve near Waddle. To smelt the ore, they began building Bellefonte Furnace near the new railroad's enginehouse in Coleville, on the outskirts of Bellefonte. The furnace was put in blast on February 1, 1888, but the local supplies of ore proved insufficient to sustain it and it was shut down in February 1891. Part of the Red Bank Branch would be abandoned in 1894.

The loss of traffic from Bellefonte Furnace hurt the railroad, which was sold at foreclosure on December 1, 1891. It was reorganized on May 9, 1892, as the Bellefonte Central Railroad.

=== Expansion ===
Bellefonte Central Railroad
Overview
- Headquarters: Bellefonte
- Locale: Centre County, Pennsylvania
- Dates of operation: 1892–1984
- Successor: abandoned

Technical
- Track gauge: 4 ft 8 1/2 in (1,435 mm) standard gauge

The new railroad was organized under the presidency of Robert Frazer, a precocious civil engineer formerly employed by the Lehigh Valley Coal Company. Frazer's first goal was to reduce dependence on ore traffic by extending the railroad from a wye at Struble to State College. The branch would carry passenger traffic, less-than-carload freight, and coal for the college power plant. Because of the railroad's slender financial reserves, the Oreland Branch was removed and its rails used for the State College extension. The first train ran over the new branch on April 2, 1892. The original station was located at College Avenue and Frazier Street and built in the Queen Anne style. The building of the extension also increased passenger service, with three trips per day (except Sunday) each way from Bellefonte to State College, and two per day each way from Waddle to Red Bank. The Bellefonte Central also promoted passenger traffic by building an amusement park on the former Benjamin Hunter farm, which it called Hunter's Park, and by investing in the University Inn, which provided hotel accommodations for visitors to Penn State and had its own stop on the railroad. However, the railroad discontinued passenger service on the Red Bank Branch in 1894. Many of the miners had left the area when ore banks shut down after Bellefonte Furnace went out of blast, and few riders remained for the Waddle–Red Bank trains.

Since the shutdown of Bellefonte Furnace, President Frazer had been trying to reach a rate agreement with John Reilly of the furnace company. They came to terms in July 1892, and Reilly began making arrangements to restart ore mining and put the furnace back in blast. It resumed ironmaking in March 1893, and the Bellefonte Central acquired additional ore cars to serve the traffic. At the end of April, Tom Shoemaker resigned as superintendent to tend to his expanding duties supervising Bellefonte Furnace and ore mining at Graysdale. He was replaced by Francis H. Thomas, a long-time Reading employee. Unfortunately, the new furnace traffic would prove ephemeral. The Panic of 1893 forced Bellefonte Furnace to shut down again in July, after only four months of operation. While the railroad was still shipping ore to the McCoy and Linn Iron Works, Shoemaker could find few other customers for Graysdale ore and its importance to the railroad again declined.

Despite the poor economic times, the railroad's management remained confident. On May 10, 1894, the directors approved the extension of the main line from Struble to Pine Grove Mills. Such an extension had been contemplated as long ago as 1884, during the BRB&BE era. While Pine Grove Mills would originate some traffic through farming and logging, the extension was primarily contemplated as part of a larger route. By extending south from Pine Grove Mills to Huntingdon, the line could connect with the Huntingdon and Broad Top Mountain Railroad, an independent railroad serving the Broad Top coal region. By linking to the Central Railroad of Pennsylvania at Bellefonte (built in 1893 over the contemplated Nittany Valley & Southern route), the Bellefonte Central could form part of a coal route tapping the Broad Top field on behalf of the New York Central. However, the route faced a formidable obstacle in the crossing of Tussey Mountain. Such a line would require switchbacks or a long summit tunnel. The Pennsylvania Railroad already occupied the only usable gap at Spruce Creek and would not look favorably on its new competitor for the Broad Top traffic. However, the economy remained slow, and the railroad found it difficult to obtain land at favorable prices. After a little grading, the project stalled until 1896, when the railroad lifted the rail from the derelict Red Bank Branch west of Graysdale and used it to lay track on the extension. Service on the extension opened to Bloomsdorf in September 1896 and to Pine Grove Mills in December. Despite a $75,000 subscription offered by the town of Stone Valley (now submerged under Lake Perez) to complete the extension to Huntingdon, the expense of further extension would clearly have outstripped the railroad's finances. The Bellefonte Central undertook no further construction towards Huntingdon.

Despite the loss of ore traffic, the Bellefonte Central had managed to keep its financial house in good order during the 1890s. Penn State University had begun to represent an important source of freight and passenger traffic, although the railroad frequently clashed with the school over unpaid bills. In 1896, Professor John Price Jackson obtained permission from the railroad to run trolley wire over its tracks from State College to Struble. An old Philadelphia Traction Company trolley was operated by electrical engineering students over the line until 1905.

Ore traffic did see a resurgence, as the re-opened Bellefonte Furnace went from sporadic operation during the 1890s to a more sustained level in 1899 and 1900. To supply additional iron ore, the owners of the furnace bought the ore pits around Scotia from the Carnegie interests, who were switching to Mesabi Range ore. The Bellefonte Central relaid almost a mile of the abandoned Red Bank Branch from Graysdale to the mines of Mattern Bank and built a new line from Graysdale to Scotia to reach the Scotia mines, previously served by the Fairbrook Branch of the PRR. However, the railroad lost some of the furnace traffic in 1899 to the Central RR of PA. This railroad was owned by the same interests as Bellefonte Furnace, and in that year, it built a long trestle over the PRR to reach the furnace directly and connect with the Bellefonte Central. The furnace first switched its source of lime to a quarry along the Central RR of PA, instead of the Bellefonte Central, and in 1903, a new interchange between the Central RR of PA and the PRR allowed the furnace to shift inbound coke and outbound iron traffic to the Central as well. Furthermore, the Mesabi ores were beginning to replace local ore, even in Bellefonte.

=== Search for new traffic ===
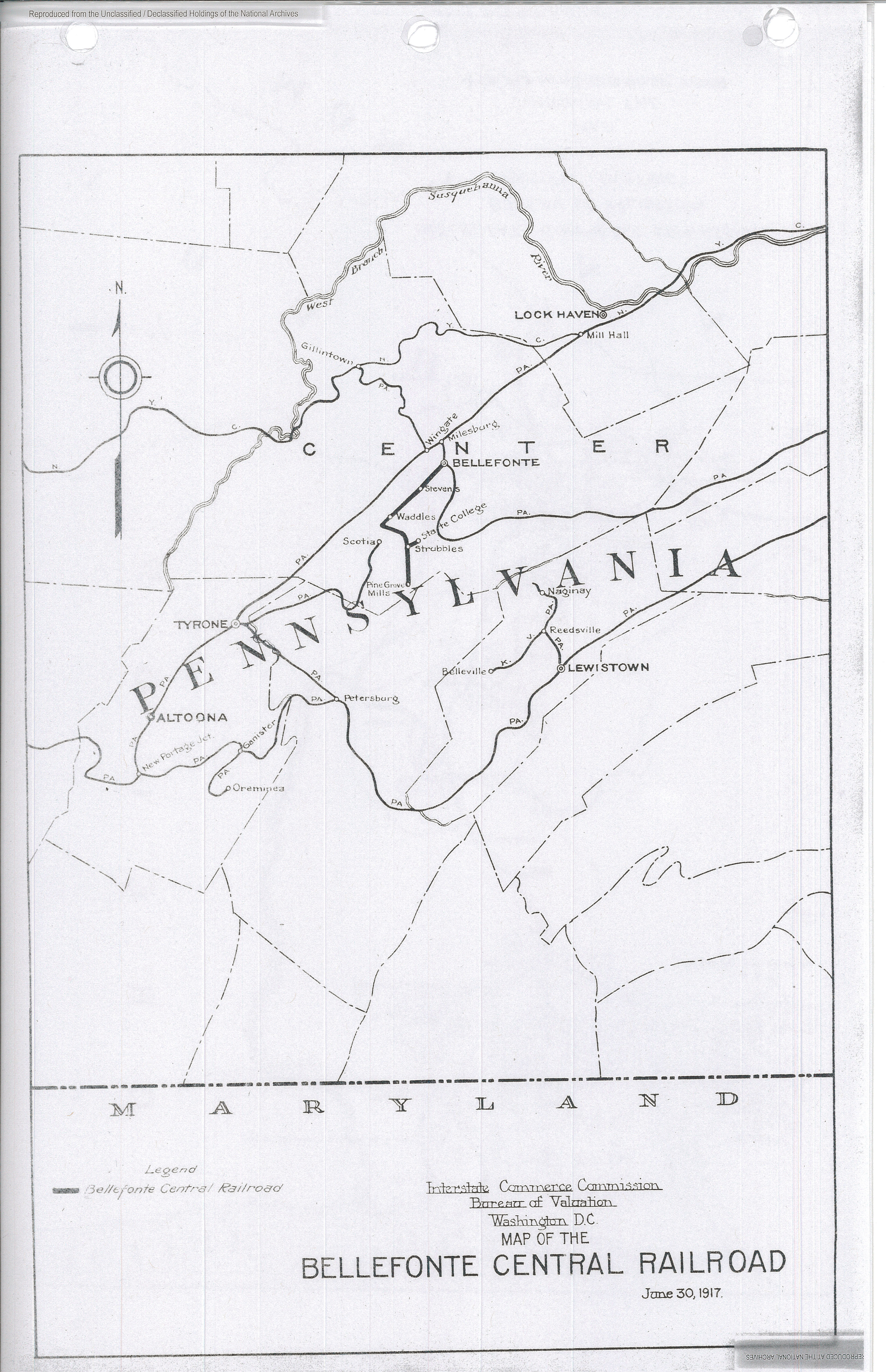
1917 map of the railroad

Bellefonte Furnace closed on December 21, 1910, and Nittany Furnace in 1911. Their last contribution to the railroad's prosperity was the huge heaps of slag accumulated at the furnace sites: this was shipped over the Bellefonte Central to the PRR for use in construction projects. While the loss of furnace traffic would ultimately prove fatal to the Central RR of PA, the Bellefonte Central had found new sources of revenue. The McNitt-Huyett Lumber Company opened a mill at Waddle in 1909 and built an extensive network of 36 inch (91.44 cm) gauge track into the Scotia area, dual-gauging the Scotia branch and making use of the abandoned rights-of-way from the area's iron-mining heyday. The local timber was soon exhausted, and the branches to Mattern Bank and Scotia were abandoned in 1915. However, McNitt-Huyett built further extensions, and continued to haul logs to the Waddle mill until about 1919. Furthermore, high calcium limestone deposits in Bald Eagle Mountain, on the north side of the Buffalo Run valley, were now being exploited, much of their production going to steel mills in Pittsburgh. These quarries, eventually consolidated under the management of the Chemical Lime Company, would replace the iron furnaces as the principal generators of traffic on the Bellefonte Central.

With dreams of expansion towards Huntingdon long gone, the branch to Pine Grove Mills was removed in 1919. However, a new opportunity to lengthen the railroad would arrive. In 1927, the PRR applied to abandon its little-used Fairbrook Branch. The Bellefonte Central, with the blessing of the Interstate Commerce Commission, bought the line from Fairbrook to Stover, and obtained trackage rights from Stover into Tyrone. A new line was built from Struble to Fairbrook (more direct than the roundabout and now abandoned route via Scotia), and service to Tyrone began in 1930. The object of the purchase was to send freight directly to the PRR main line at Tyrone, bypassing the circuitous route via Bellefonte. Furthermore, Professor Ernest L. Nixon (uncle of Richard Nixon) owned a large potato farm near Fairbrook and planned to turn the area into a major potato-growing region. Other traffic would include lumber, clay, and furnace slag. However, the resentful PRR refused to supply cars at Tyrone, and gave the same rate for interchange at Tyrone as at Bellefonte. With no rate differential to offset the costs of the longer run to Tyrone, it was uneconomical for the Bellefonte Central to interchange there. The stockholders brought in new management in the wake of this debacle, in 1933, and operations were suspended on the branch. However, passenger operations continued on the segment from Bellefonte to Lemont (adjacent to State College).

=== Depression, World War II and decline ===
Litigation over interchange at Tyrone continued until 1938, ending with a decision unfavorable to the Bellefonte Central. The railroad promptly filed to abandon the line from State College to Stover, but approval was not granted until May 1941. The rails were removed by that November.

Frustrated in its expansion attempt, the Bellefonte Central was sustained throughout the Great Depression by the shipment of construction material to State College. Penn State extensively expanded its campus in the late 1920s and 1930s, in part to keep up with increased enrollment during the Depression, and many supplies traveled over the railroad. A new station was built on North Atherton Street in State College in 1930, and the line was cut back to the power plant. (The Hammond Building now occupies the old right-of-way to the original station.) Shipments from the lime quarries fell as the steel industry collapsed, and Chemical Lime went into bankruptcy in 1935. However, the company continued operating during the bankruptcy, and was prompted to modernize its operations, building a new rail-served lime plant at "Chemical" and abandoning quarrying for deep-shaft mining. While it was bought out by National Gypsum Company at the end of 1940, the modernization (paid for by a Reconstruction Finance Corporation loan) would keep the lime operation competitive for decades, and make it the largest shipper on the Bellefonte Central.

The outbreak of World War II and the ensuing industrial demand further increased lime traffic. The war also brought about a brief resurgence in the Bellefonte Central's original source of revenue, iron ore. The Scotia Mining Company was formed at the beginning of the war to resume mining in Scotia, and built a new ore washer in 1942. The ore was initially trucked to Waddle for shipment, but after it was determined to be insufficiently pure, the company obtained Reconstruction Finance Corp. money for further improvements. A new 3 mile (4.8 km) spur was built from the main line at Lagarde (Alto) to a new beneficiation plant at Scotia. However, only 35 carloads of ore were shipped before the Surrender of Japan, and the resulting fall in iron ore prices made mining uneconomical once again.

While regular passenger service ended in 1946, post-war traffic remained strong, again largely on the basis of Penn State construction. The Bellefonte Central also carried construction materials for the building of local homes, as enrollment at Penn State increased under the GI Bill. Although the advent of trucking was steadily eating into the less-than-carload freight business, the railroad still handled bulk deliveries of food to Penn State and shipments of machinery, automobiles, and paper. While the delivery of coal to local homes ended in 1947, the railroad continued to haul about 470 cars per year of coal to supply the Penn State power plant. In 1953, the Bellefonte Central bought an EMD SW9, its first diesel locomotive, and retired its steam locomotive in 1956, after buying an EMD SW1200.

However, the best years of the railroad were now behind it: it recorded its highest operating income in 1955. In 1959, Penn State switched to trucks for coal shipments to its power plant, and scheduled service to State College ended. The collapse in traffic further accelerated in the 1960s, with the general decline of the Northeastern railroads. As the Pennsylvania Railroad (Penn Central after 1968) deteriorated, rail shipments suffered increasingly long delays, for which the Bellefonte Central could not compensate. The era also saw the last passenger service over the railroad, a PRR special from Pittsburgh for the University of Pittsburgh–Penn State football game in 1964. After years of attempting to generate new traffic in State College, the Bellefonte Central finally gave up on the southern end of its line in 1974. The last train left State College on July 22, 1974, and 13 miles (21 km) of rail were pulled up from State College to Chemical in 1976. From now on, National Gypsum would be the railroad's only customer.

=== Last years and abandonment ===
New management came to both the lime plant and the railroad in 1976. The plant was bought by Domtar, while the Bellefonte Central was sold to Kyle Railways. Prospects still appeared reasonable for the railroad, as the plant at Chemical (bought by Domtar in 1976) had an extensive customer base. Most of the lime produced there went to steel mills in Pennsylvania, New York, and Ohio. Ground lime was also shipped to glass manufacturers, and to chemical and paper companies. However, the Pennsylvania steel industry soon began to falter under the pressure of foreign competition and its own inefficiencies. As the steel industry fell, the lime market also collapsed, and Domtar shut down the plant at Chemical on July 1, 1982. The Bellefonte Central shut down the same day. The Chemical plant was sold in April 1983 to Confer Trucking, a local firm, which operated it at reduced capacity and had no need for rail service. Accordingly, the Bellefonte Central filed for abandonment in 1984. The 4.1 miles (6.6 km) from Chemical to Coleville were removed in spring 1985. However, the last mile of track from Bellefonte to Coleville was bought by the SEDA-COG Joint Rail Authority, in order to make use of the enginehouse at Coleville. This track is now part of the Nittany and Bald Eagle Railroad, and the old Bellefonte Central enginehouse is now used for their locomotives. About a mile of the right-of-way on the grounds of The Arboretum at Penn State has been converted to a rail trail, which was opened on May 22, 2006.

== Stations ==
Main Line

Name	Mileage	Notes
Bellefonte	0.00	Connection with Pennsylvania Railroad
Coleville	0.85	Enginehouse and shops; site of Bellefonte Furnace
Morris	2.31	
Stevens	3.19	
Chemical	3.54	Site of Chemical Lime/National Gypsum/Domtar plant
Whitmer		
Linns		
Hunter's Park	5.40	Amusement park built by the railroad
Fillmore	6.72	
Sellers		
Briarly	8.50	
Waddle	10.33	
Mattern Junction		connection with Red Bank (later Scotia) Branch
Lagarde	13.34	or Alto; connection with branch to Scotia Mining Company
Krumrine	16.10	
Struble	17.47	connection with Pine Grove Mills and Fairbrook Branches
State College	18.30	station now a bus terminal

Red Bank and Scotia Branches

Name	Mileage	Notes
Mattern Junction		connection with main line
Graysdale		junction Scotia Branch
Mattern		
Stormstown Station		at some distance from the town
Red Bank		site of ore mining
Scotia Branch
Scotia		site of ore mining

Pine Grove Mills Branch

Name	Mileage	Notes
Struble	0.0	connection with main line
Bloomsdorf		
Pine Grove Mills	3.5	station site adjacent to Ferguson Township Elementary School

Fairbrook Branch

Name	Mileage	Notes
Struble	0.0	connection with main line
Fairbrook	5.4	remainder of branch ex-PRR
Musser	7.1	
Pennsylvania Furnace	8.9	
Hostler	10.6	
Marengo	12.4	
Furnace Road	14.1	
Dungarvin	15.8	ore pits nearby
Warriors Mark	18.2	
Pennington	20.6	
Eyer	21.6	
Stover	23.6	Connection with Pennsylvania Railroad

Scotia Branch (wartime)

Name	Mileage	Notes
Lagarde	0.0	connection with main line
Scotia Mining Co. Plant	3.0	
