= Struble, Pennsylvania =

Unincorporated community in Pennsylvania, US

- Unincorporated community
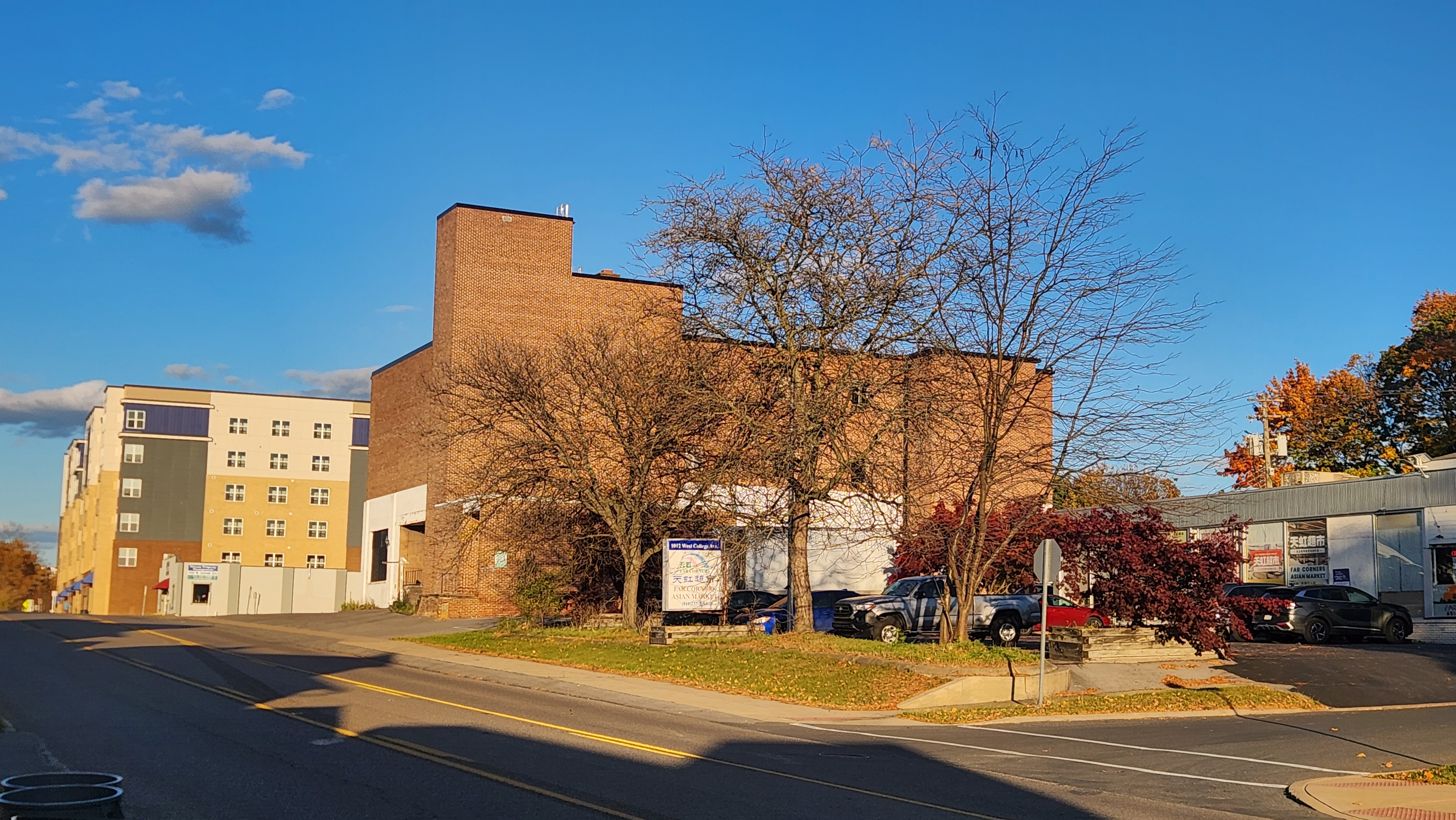
- Apartments and an East Asian Market in Struble

- Location within the U.S. state of Pennsylvania Struble (the United States)
- Coordinates: 40°46′58″N 77°52′34″W
- Country: United States
- State: Pennsylvania
- County: Centre
- Township: Ferguson
- Elevation: 1,158 ft (353 m)
- Time zone: UTC-5 (Eastern (EST))
  - Summer (DST): UTC-4 (EDT)
- GNIS feature ID: 1188893

Struble is a neighborhood and an unincorporated community in Ferguson Township, Centre County, Pennsylvania, United States. It is part of Happy Valley and the larger Nittany Valley. The neighborhood is to the east of Pine Hall, and west of the West End in State College.

The town was named after Conrad Struble, who owned a farm there which proved to lie over rich deposits of iron ore. Mining began in 1880. The Bellefonte and Buffalo Run Railroad graded a right-of-way from Bellefonte to the ore pits in 1883, but track was not laid until 1887, by its successor the Buffalo Run, Bellefonte and Bald Eagle Railroad. Even after the end of ore mining, Struble remained an important junction point on the railroad, now the Bellefonte Central.
