= Bucher Ayres Farm =

- U.S. National Register of Historic Places
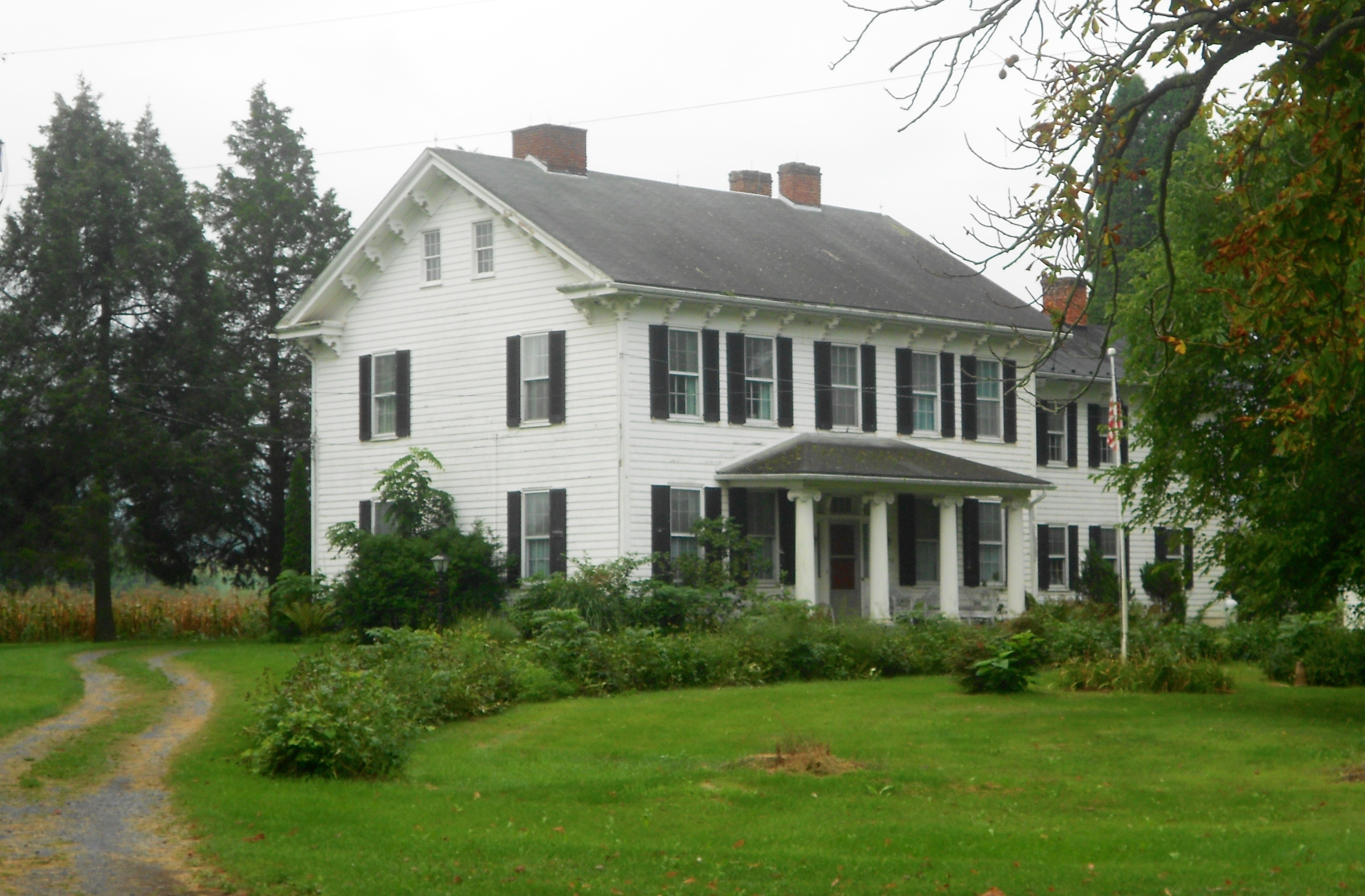
- Main house

- Location within Pennsylvania Location within the United States
- Location: Southwest of Pine Grove Mills on Whitehall Road, Pennsylvania Furnace, Ferguson Township, Pennsylvania, US
- Coordinates: 40°43′21″N 77°57′54″W
- Area: 295 acres (119 ha)
- Built: 1858
- Built by: George Reynolds,
- Architectural style: Greek Revival, Georgian
- NRHP reference No.: 80003453
- Added to NRHP: December 1, 1980

Bucher Ayres Farm is a historic home and farm complex located at Ferguson Township, Centre County, Pennsylvania, United States. The complex consists of the main house, a carriage shed / ice house, a smoke house, and an outhouse. The main house was built in 1858, and is in three sections. The main block is two stories and five bays wide in a traditional Georgian style. It features a three bay, Greek Revival style portico with a hipped roof.

It was added to the National Register of Historic Places in 1980.
