= David "Robber" Lewis =

David Lewis, known as "Davy" or "Robber" Lewis (March 4, 1790 –July 12, 1820), was an American criminal who became known as the "Robin Hood of Pennsylvania" for his style of crime.

Lewis was born in Carlisle, Pennsylvania. He began his criminal career as a counterfeiter, but eventually turned to highway robbery. Known as the "Robin Hood of Pennsylvania", there are numerous stories of Lewis having "robbed from the rich to give to the poor". Many of these tales are more folklore than history, though there are several newspaper accounts from the period that describe Lewis as assisting the downtrodden, taking pity on some intended victims, and befriending many locals, who often assisted him in evading justice. Lewis apparently referred to himself as "an equalizer".

Lewis and his gang frequently used a network of caves throughout central Pennsylvania as hideouts and stores for stolen goods, Indian Caverns claimed to be one such hideout during its time as a show cave.

Lewis was arrested several times and broke out of jail on every occasion. He was finally apprehended by a posse in 1820. He died from a gunshot wound received during his capture. On his deathbed in Bellefonte Jail, he wrote an autobiography in the form of confessions which was published at the time, excerpts of which have appeared in several newspaper accounts since.
