= Happy Valley (Pennsylvania) =

Coordinates: 40.8037°N 77.8589°W

Happy Valley State College, PA MSA Centre Region Council of Governments
- Metropolitan statistical area
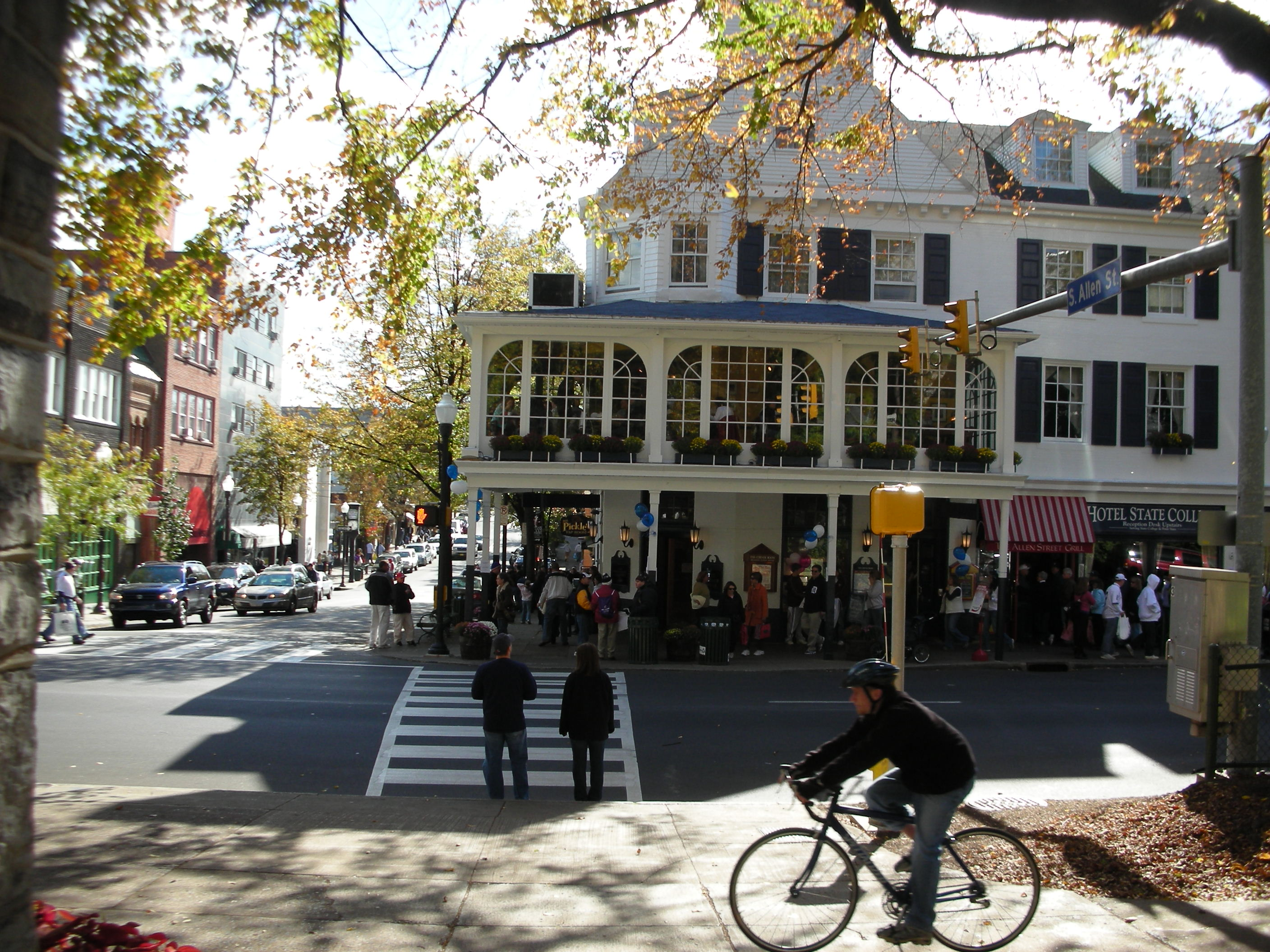
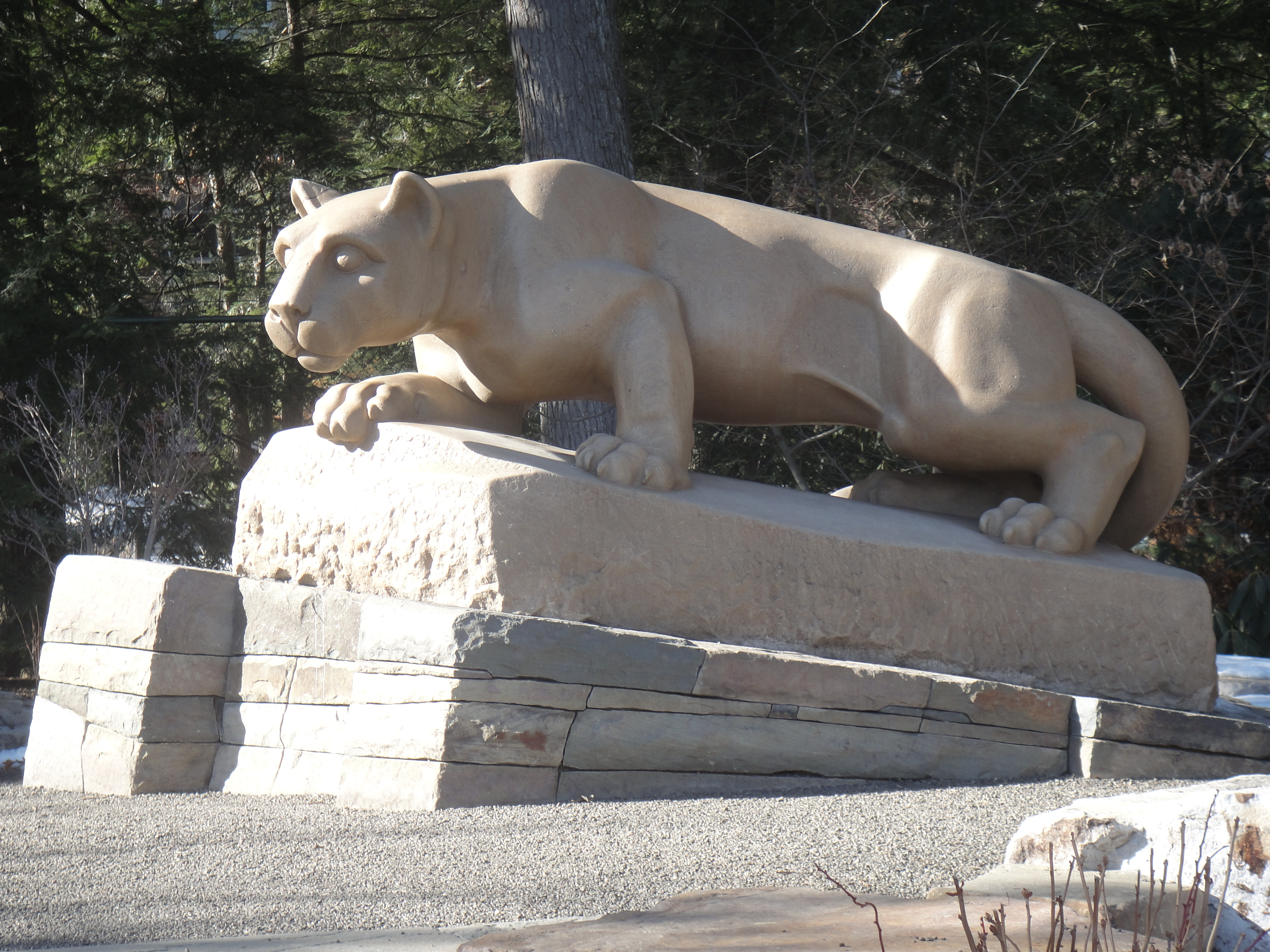
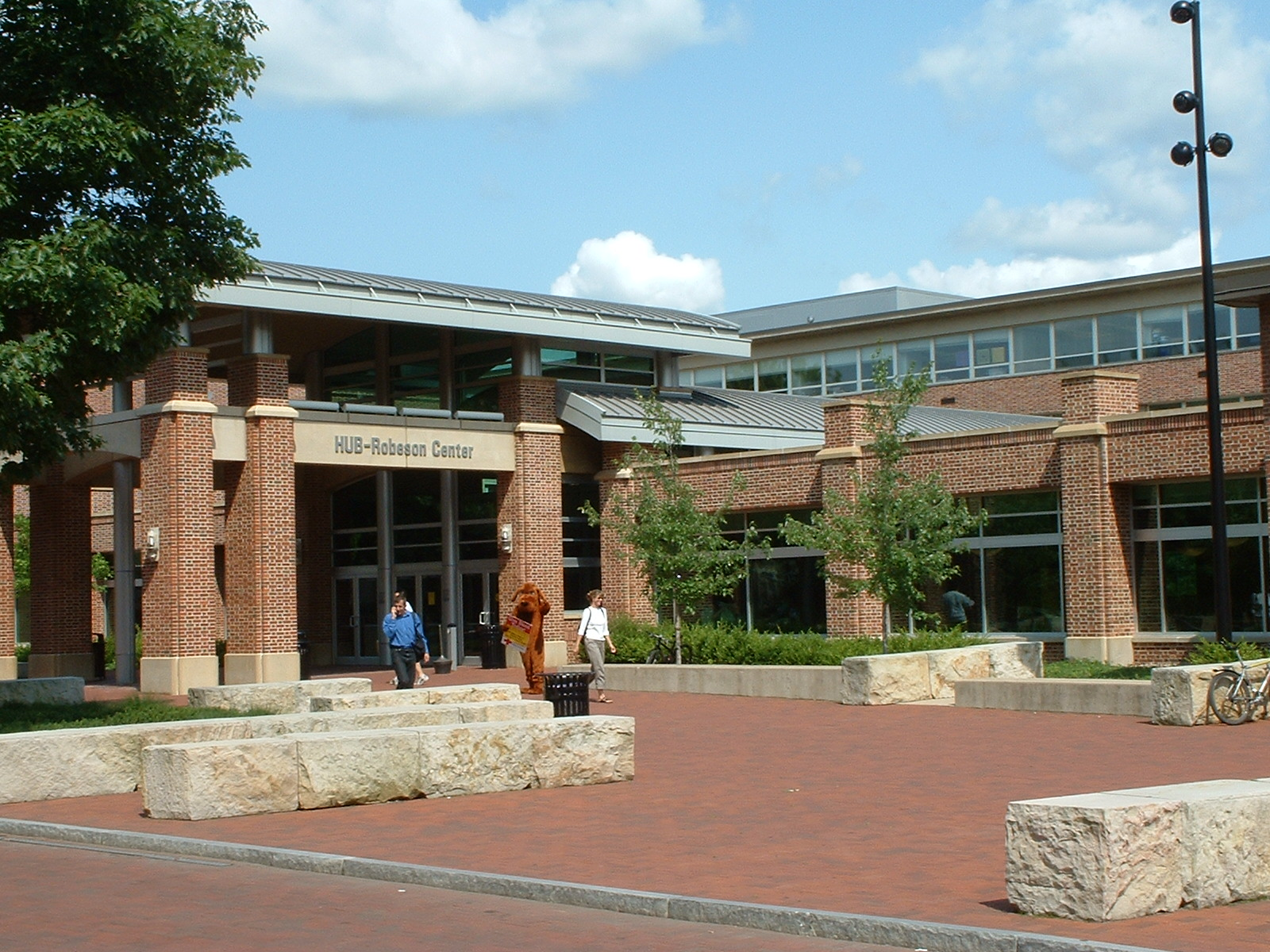
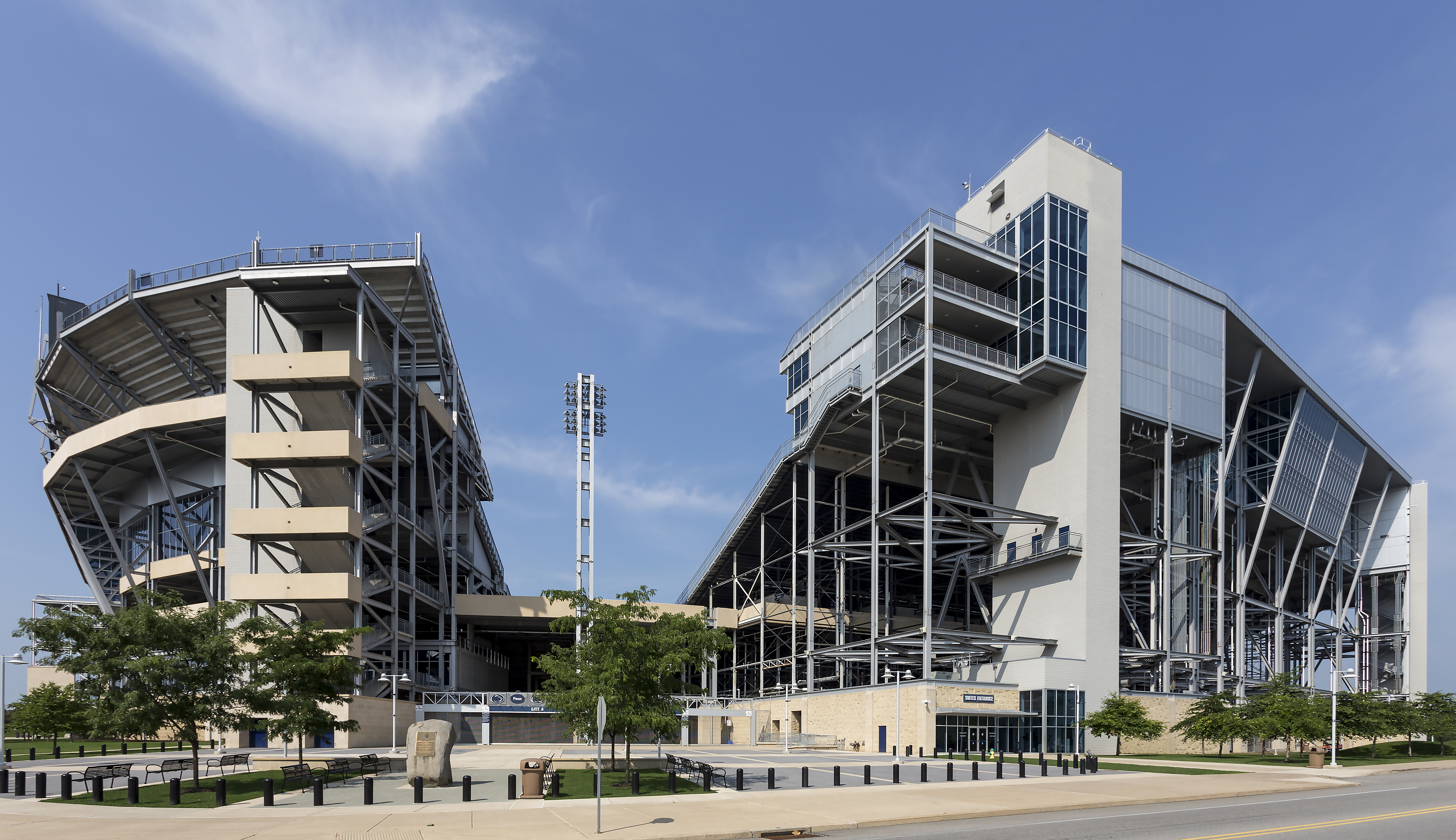
- Clockwise from top left: Downtown State College at Allen Street, Nittany Lion Shrine, Beaver Stadium, and HUB-Robeson Center at Pennsylvania State University

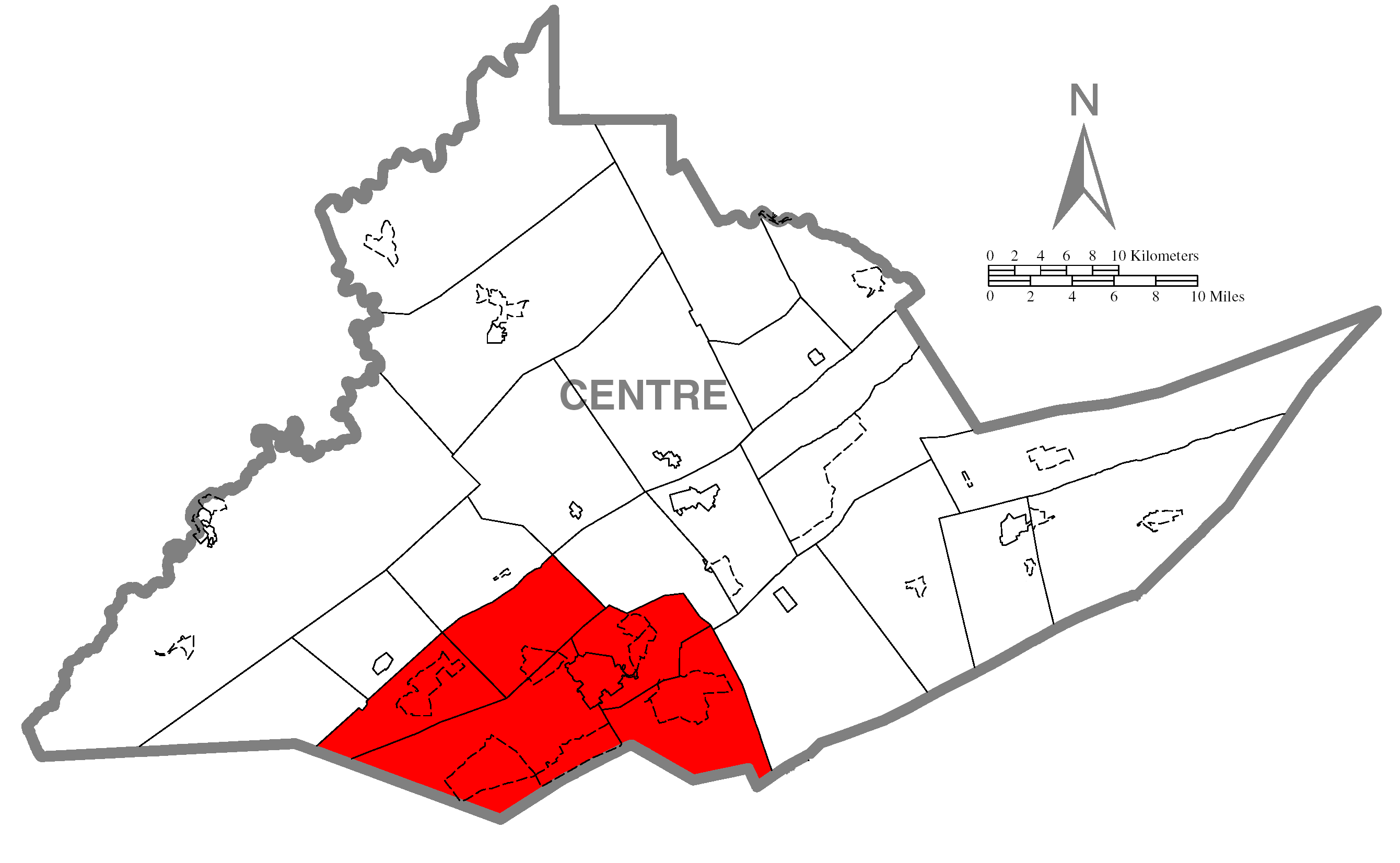
- Map of Centre County with Happy Valley in red

- Map of Pennsylvania with Centre County in red
- Country: United States
- State: Pennsylvania
- Principal cities: State College, College, Ferguson, Halfmoon, Harris, and Patton
- Elevation: 1,152 ft (351 m)

Population (2010)
  - Metro: MSA:158,742 (US: 257th); CSA: 236,577 (US: 124th)
- Time zone: UTC-5 (EST)
  - Summer (DST): UTC-4 (EST)

Happy Valley is a region in Centre County, Pennsylvania, United States. The region contains the borough of State College, and five townships, College, Halfmoon, Harris, Patton, and Ferguson. The region is part of the larger Nittany Valley, and is bounded by Penns Valley to the east, Bald Eagle Valley to the north and west, and Huntingdon County to the south. These municipalities comprise the Centre Region Council of Governments, and are part of the State College Area School District, the State College Metropolitan Statistical Area, and the State College–DuBois, PA Combined Statistical Area.

== History ==
The Delaware, Iroquois, Mingo, and Shawnee were some of the first native inhabitants who began establishing settlements, farms, and trails throughout the valley and its water gaps.

The Houserville archeological site is a prehistoric stone workshop found in Puddintown, while the adjacent Tudek Site is a prehistoric quarry. They are both listed on the National Register of Historic Places.

Many of the early villages in Happy Valley grew as railway towns along the Bellefonte Central Railroad and the Lewisburg and Tyrone Railroad including Lemont, Struble, Scotia, Fairbrook, and Waddle.

The name Happy Valley was coined in the 1950s by Harold "Pat" O'Brien, a Penn State graduate and WWII veteran. When Pat moved to State College to complete his Ph.D. in speech communications, he and his wife, Harriet, began using the term 'Happy Valley' to describe the area, inspired by its peacefulness and natural beauty. The phrase was popularized by their friends and local newspaper columnists, Ross and Katey Lehman, who began regularly using the term 'Happy Valley' in their daily Open House column in the Centre Daily Times in 1954, continuing through 1980.

Another theory on the name origin comes from the Great Depression-era of the 1930s since it was generally not hit hard financially by the depression because of the presence of Pennsylvania State University.

== Geography ==
Happy Valley is enclosed by Tussey Mountain and Bald Eagle Mountain. Skytop is a wind gap between that connects Happy Valley to the Bald Eagle Valley. Mount Nittany is a prominent natural landmark in Happy Valley.

== Communities ==
=== Municipalities ===
- State College
- College Township
- Ferguson Township
- Halfmoon Township
- Harris Township
- Patton Township

=== Census-designated places ===
Census-designated places are geographical areas designated by the U.S. Census Bureau for the purposes of compiling demographic data. They are not actual jurisdictions under Pennsylvania law.

- Boalsburg
- Houserville
- Lemont
- Park Forest Village
- Pine Grove Mills
- Ramblewood
- Stormstown
- Toftrees

=== Other communities ===
- Cato
- Centennial
- Fairbrook
- Fillmore
- Gatesburg
- Graysdale
- Linden Hall
- Millbrook
- Oak Hall
- Overlook Heights
- Panorama
- Pine Hall
- Scotia
- Shingletown
- Skytop
- Struble
- University Park
- Waddle
- Woodycrest

== Culture ==
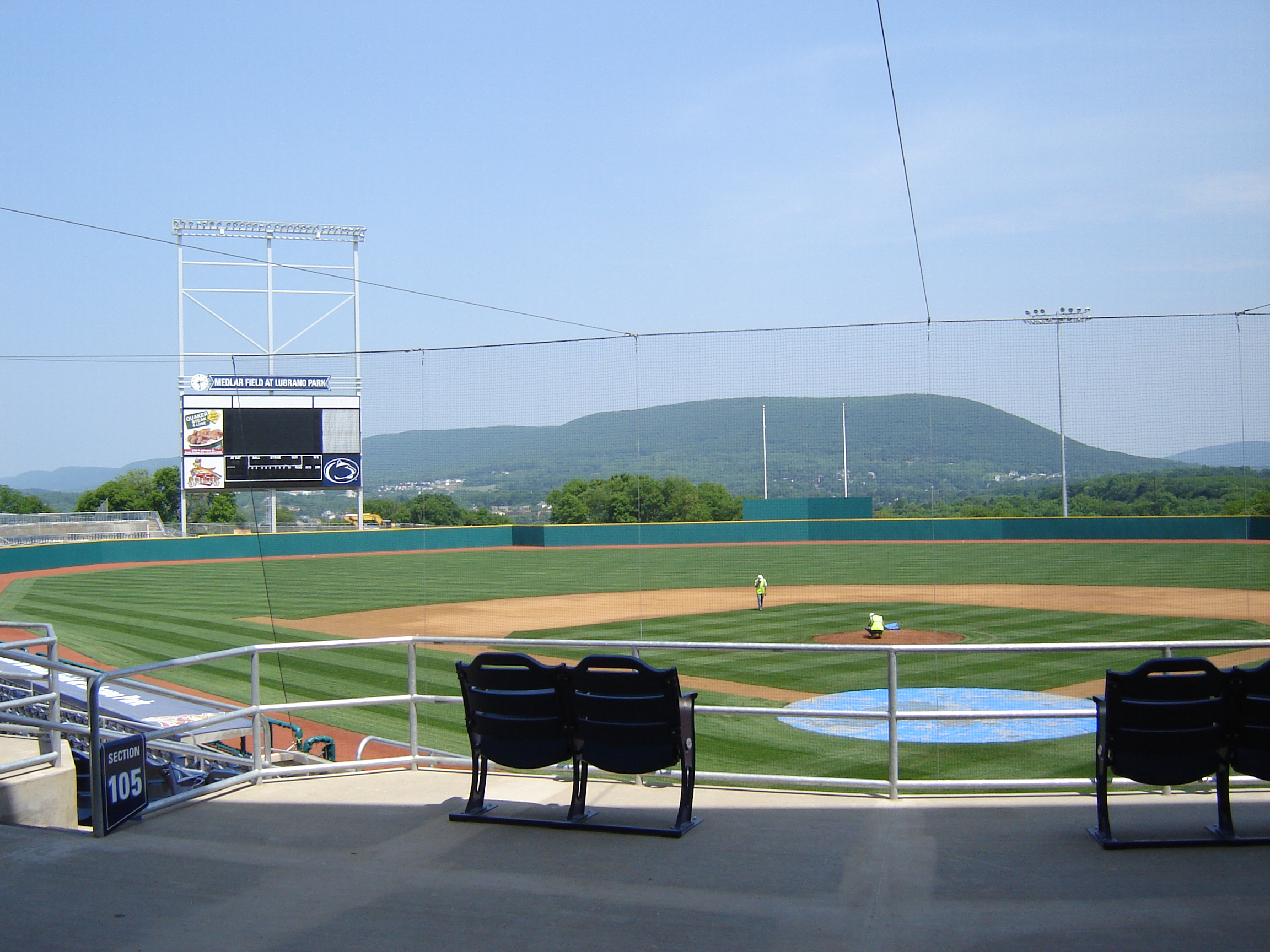
Medlar Field at Lubrano Park, home of the State College Spikes

The culture of Happy Valley is largely dominated by Penn State University. The activities that occur in this region largely surround the student activities, such as student arrivals, football Saturdays, Homecoming, and graduation. Though the region is also home to the State College Spikes, a minor league baseball team, the area is most known for the Penn State Nittany Lions football team.

During the summer session, the student population returns to their home towns, thus reducing the local population significantly. During this time, the Central Pennsylvania Festival of the Arts, usually referred to as "Arts Fest", is held for five days and draws many visitors to town during what would otherwise be a quiet period. Streets are closed off and lined with booths where people can buy paintings, pottery, jewelry, and other hand-made goods. There are also numerous musical performances and plays to take in, and food vendors selling everything from funnel cakes to Indian cuisine.

The Penn State IFC/Panhellenic Dance Marathon, commonly referred to as THON, is a 46-hour Dance Marathon that takes place every February on the University Park campus with the purpose of raising money for the Four Diamonds Foundation. A number of events throughout the year pave the way to February's THON weekend. The Borough of State College changes its name during the 46-hour event to City of THON even though the event takes place in College Township and not State College.

Blue-White Football Weekend occurs in April and includes a carnival, fireworks, food vendors, the student entertainment stage, live music, a parade, and more. On game day, an autograph session with the football student-athletes is held in Beaver Stadium, prior to kickoff of the Blue-White football intrasquad scrimmage game.

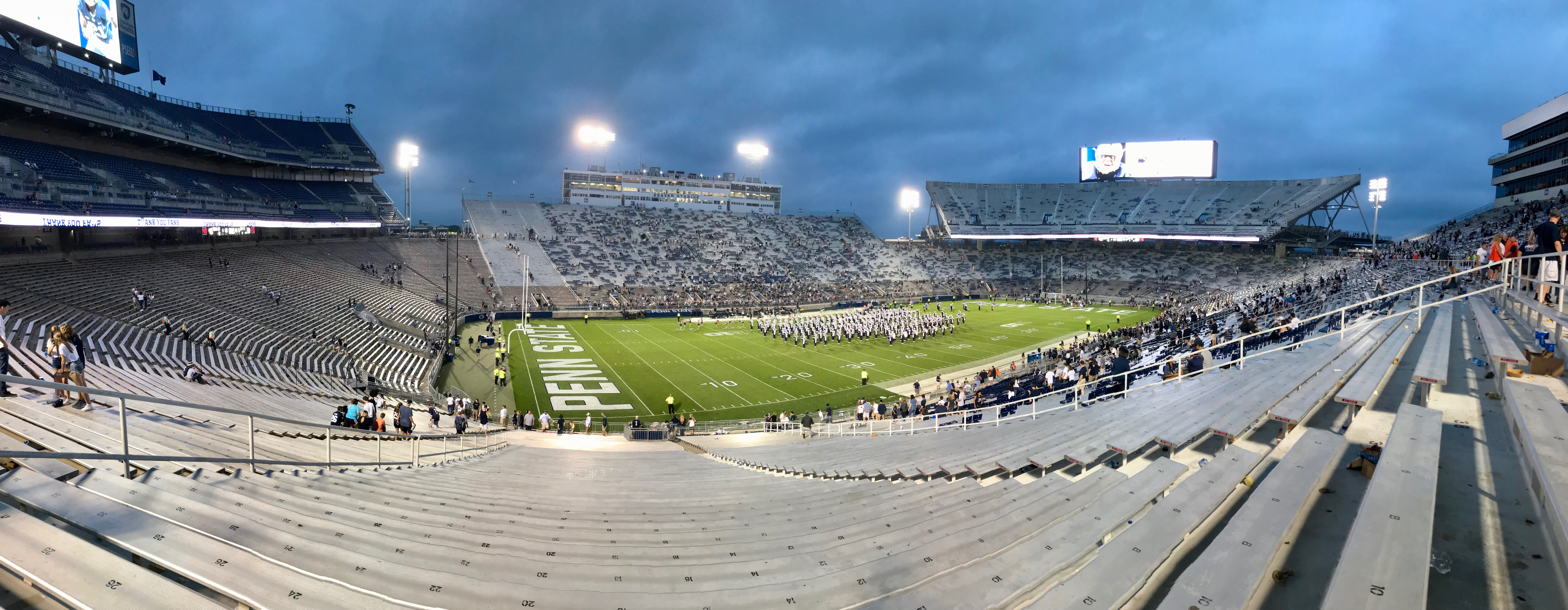
Beaver Stadium, home of the Penn State Nittany Lions football team, is the world's fourth largest stadium with a capacity of 106,572

== Demographics ==
Population by Age Distribution (2010 Census)
Age Range	Percentage of Population
Under 18	16.9%
Ages 20-34	34.3%
Ages 35-49	16.3%
Ages 50-64	16.4%
Ages 65+	12.3%

Population by Race Distribution (2010 Census)
Race	Percentage of Population
White	89.4%
Asian	5.2%
Black/African American	3.0%
American Indian/Alaskan native	0.1%
Native Hawaiian/Pacific Islander	0.0%
Hispanic/Latino Origin	2.4%

== Economy ==
Penn State is the largest employer in Happy Valley.

#	Employer	# of employees
1	Pennsylvania State University	27,029
2	Mount Nittany Medical Center	2,365
3	State College Area School District	1,792
4	Government of Pennsylvania	1,704
5	Walmart	732
6	Glenn O. Hawbaker Inc. (construction)	700
7	HRI Inc. (asphalt contractor)	692
8	Weis Markets	631
9	Centre County Government	586
10	Geisinger Medical Group	563

The healthcare and education industry employs 42% of the valley.

== Transportation ==
Highways include:

- Interstate 99
- U.S. Route 322
- U.S. Route Business 322
- PA Route 26
- PA Route 45
- PA Route 150
- PA Route 550

== Education ==
Happy Valley is entirely in the State College Area School District.
