= Spruce Creek (Pennsylvania) =

River in United States of America

Coordinates: 40°36′31″N 78°08′09″W

Spruce Creek is a 16.5-mile-long (26.6 km) tributary of the Little Juniata River in Huntingdon County, Pennsylvania in the United States.

Spruce Creek passes by Indian Caverns several miles before joining the Little Juniata River at the village of Spruce Creek.

Located on Spruce Creek is the elite 100 member Spruce Creek Rod and Gun Club. Notable members include former president Jimmy Carter.

== See also ==
- List of rivers of Pennsylvania
