= Marengo, Pennsylvania =

Unincorporated community in Pennsylvania, US

- Unincorporated community
- Location within the U.S. state of Pennsylvania Marengo City (the United States)
- Coordinates: 40°43′52.22″N 78°1′52.02″W
- Country: United States
- State: Pennsylvania
- County: Centre
- Township: Ferguson
- Elevation: 1,129 ft (344 m)
- Time zone: UTC-5 (Eastern (EST))
  - Summer (DST): UTC-4 (EDT)
- GNIS feature ID: 1180398

Marengo (also Marengo City) is a hamlet and an unincorporated community in Ferguson Township, Centre County, Pennsylvania, United States. It is part of Happy Valley and the larger Nittany Valley. The hamlet follows Halfmoon Creek through a gap in the Gatesburg Ridge. Marengo is south of Loveville, Halfmoon Township, southwest of Gatesburg, northwest of Baileyville, and east of Huntingdon County.

The Marengo School was in use circa 1880.
