= Gatesburg Formation =

Geologic formation in Pennsylvania, United States

- Stratigraphic range: Cambrian
- Type: Formation
- Sub-units: Mines Dolomite, Ore Hill, Stacy
- Overlies: Warrior Formation

Location
- Region: Pennsylvania, New York, West Virginia, Virginia, Ohio
- Country: United States

Type section
- Named for: Exposures on Gatesburg Ridge, Centre County, Pennsylvania
- Named by: C. Butts, 1918

The Gatesburg Formation is a geologic formation in Pennsylvania. It preserves fossils dating back to the Cambrian period.

The formation is described by Berg and others as gray dolomite, limestone, and sandstone.

== See also ==
- List of fossiliferous stratigraphic units in Pennsylvania
- Paleontology in Pennsylvania

== Sources ==
- Various Contributors to the Paleobiology Database. "Fossilworks: Gateway to the Paleobiology Database". Archived from the original on 25 March 2022.
