= Slab Cabin Run =

Tributary of Spring Creek in Pennsylvania

Coordinates: 40.757751°N 77.850531°W

Slab Cabin Run is an 11.2-mile-long (18.0 km) tributary of Spring Creek in Centre County, Pennsylvania in the United States.

Slab Cabin Run joins Spring Creek at Houserville.

Water from Slab Cabin Run flows via Spring Creek to Bald Eagle Creek, the West Branch Susquehanna River, the Susquehanna River, and ultimately Chesapeake Bay.

== See also ==
- List of rivers of Pennsylvania
