= Spruce Creek, Pennsylvania =

Unincorporated community in Pennsylvania, US

- Unincorporated community
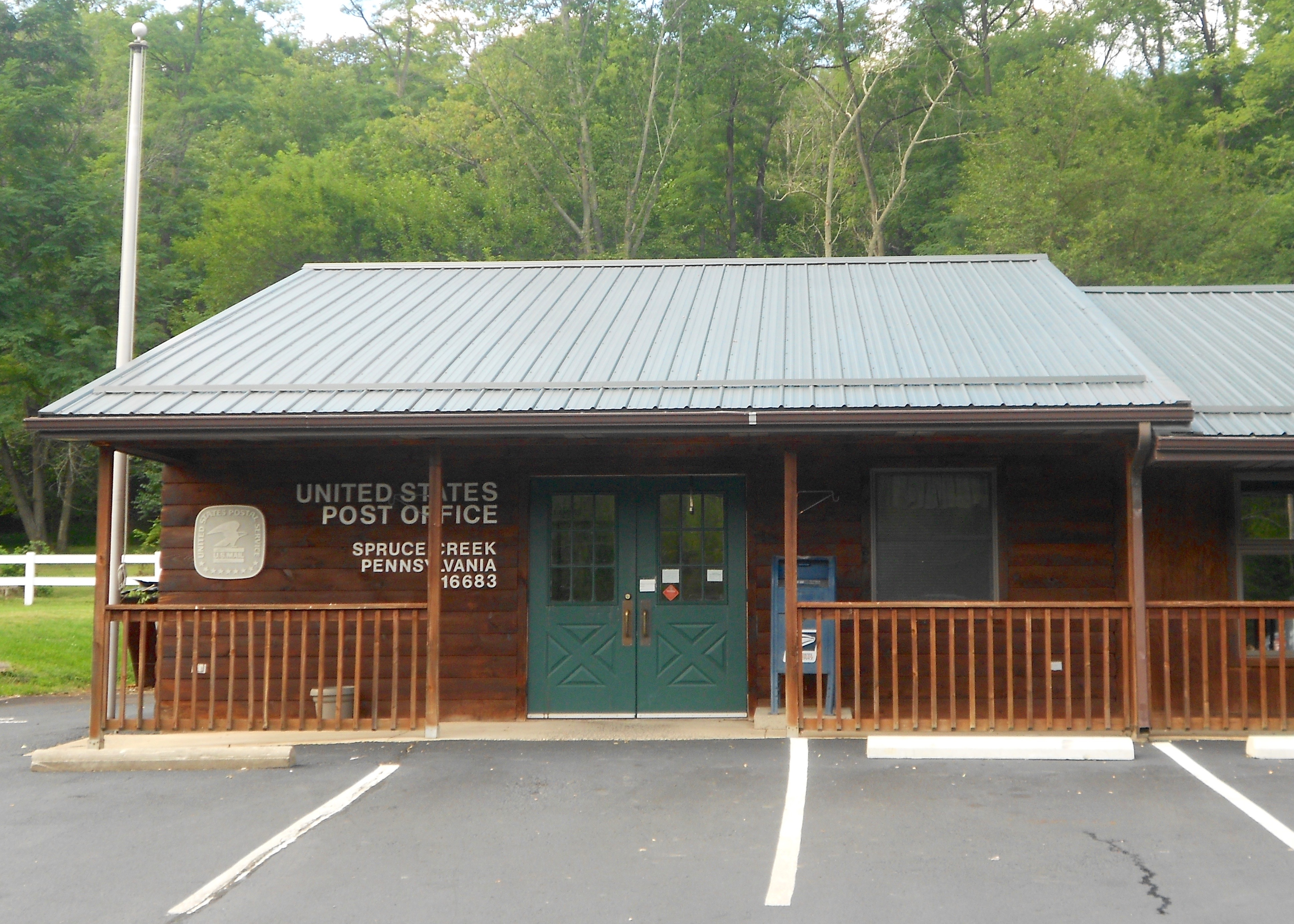
- Post office

- Location within Pennsylvania Location within the United States
- Coordinates: 40°34′17″N 78°8′17″W
- Country: United States
- State: Pennsylvania
- County: Huntingdon
- Township: Spruce Creek
- Elevation: 761 ft (232 m)
- Time zone: UTC-5 (Eastern (EST))
  - Summer (DST): UTC-4 (EDT)
- GNIS feature ID: 1188325

Spruce Creek is an unincorporated community in Spruce Creek Township, Pennsylvania, United States. It was a stop on the former Pennsylvania Railroad Main Line, lying along Spruce Creek at its confluence with the Little Juniata River. The river passes through a nearby water gap in Tussey Mountain downstream of the village, along with the railroad line.

== History ==
In the eighteenth and nineteenth centuries, Spruce Creek was the location of a large woollen mill, but is now best known as the site of Indian Caverns, which was open to the public from 1929 to 2017.

Spruce Creek is also known for its world-famous fly fishing. Although most of Spruce Creek is private fishing, the area also holds the Little Juniata River, which is open to the public. Former United States Presidents Dwight D. Eisenhower and Jimmy Carter and Pittsburgh Steelers All-Pro Troy Polamalu have made visits to fish.

President Eisenhower visited while in office on May 9, 1953. President Carter visited several times during his term.
