= Nittany Valley =

Coordinates: 40.9°N 77.7°W

- Region
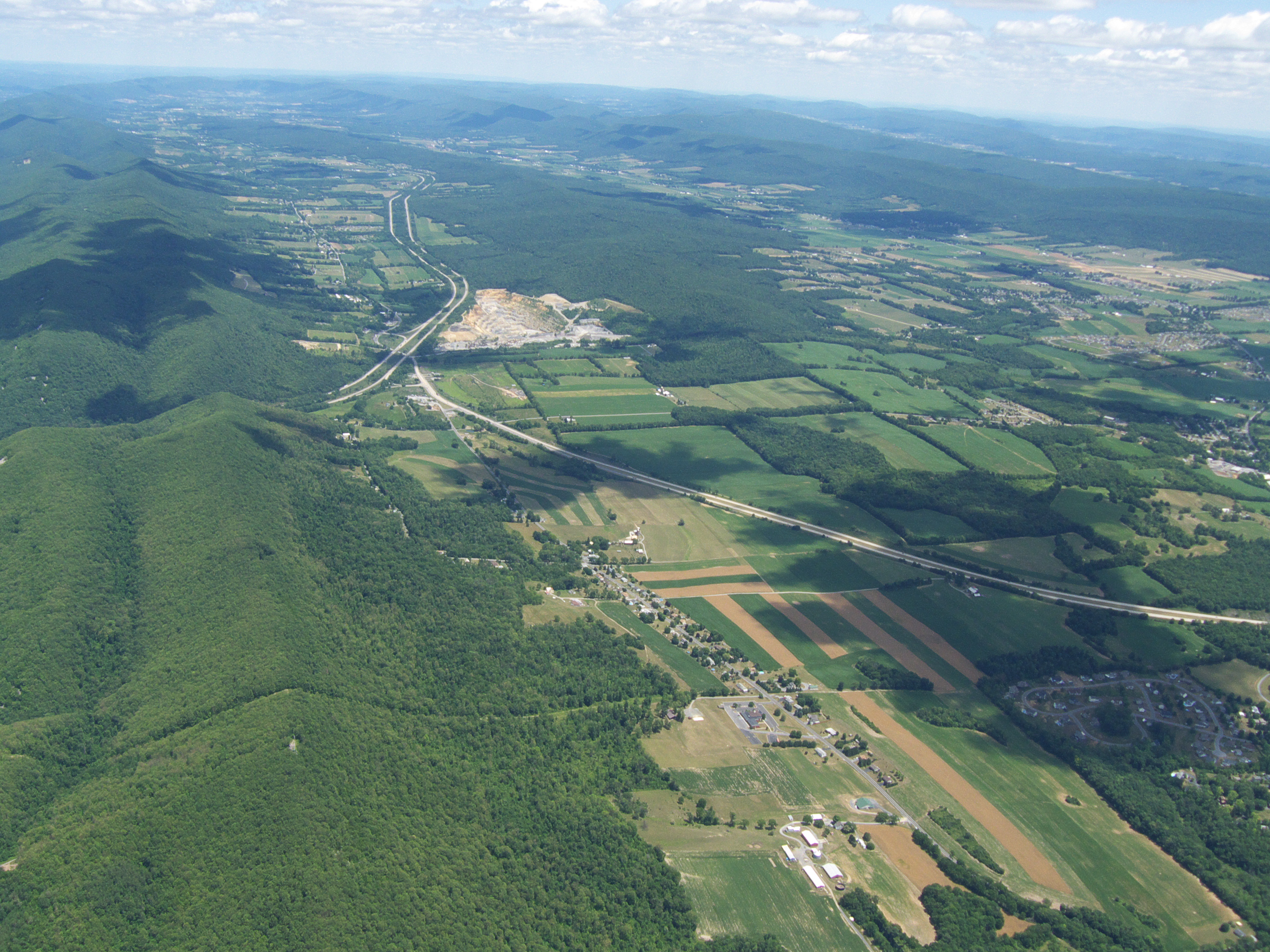
- Aerial photo of Nittany Valley looking east from Bellefonte, Pennsylvania, with Bald Eagle Mountain on the left and the back ridge of Mount Nittany in the upper right

- Country: United States
- State: Pennsylvania
- County: Centre
- Elevation: 1,154 ft (352 m)

Population (2010)
  - Total: 25,502
- Time zone: UTC-5 (EST)
  - Summer (DST): UTC-4 (EDT)
- Zip: 16823
- Area code: 814

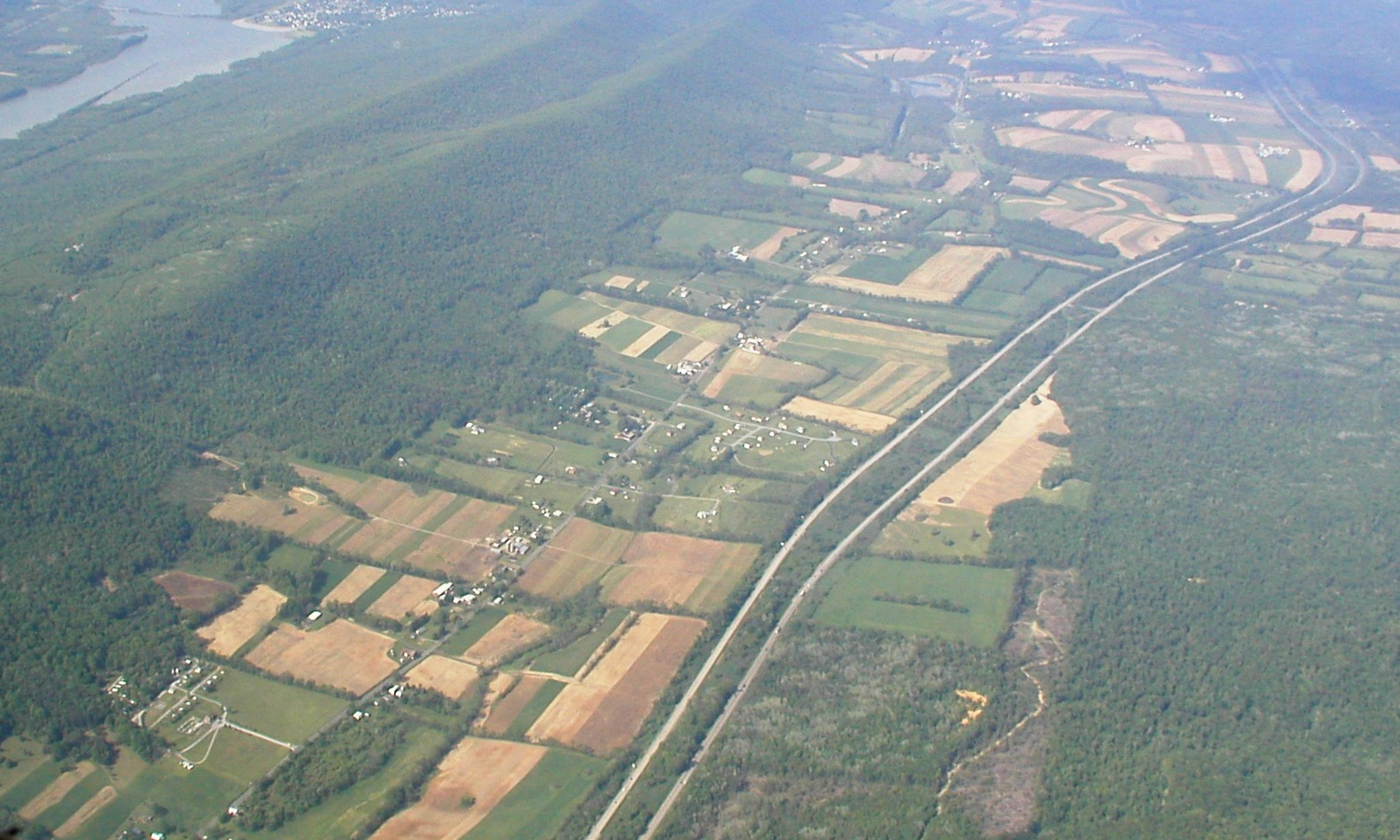
The Little Nittany Valley looking north from Bellefonte with Sand Ridge to the right, Bald Eagle Mountain on the left, Interstate 80 in between, and Foster Joseph Sayers Reservoir in Bald Eagle State Park at the top left

Nittany Valley is an eroded anticlinal valley located in Centre County, Pennsylvania. It is separated from the Bald Eagle Valley by Bald Eagle Mountain and from Penns Valley by Mount Nittany. The valley is closed to the north by a high plateau that joins these two mountain ridges, but is open to the south at the southern terminus of Mount Nittany. The valley drains to Bald Eagle Creek through water gaps in Bald Eagle Mountain formed by Spring Creek and Fishing Creek, along with smaller streams running through Curtain Gap and Howard Gap. The northwest side of the valley between the Bald Eagle Mountain ridge and the lower Sand Ridge is also known as the Little Nittany Valley.

The valley has a mixture of farmland, woodlots, and several working and abandoned quarries. Bellefonte, the county seat of Centre County, is the largest municipality completely within the valley. The Pennsylvania State Correctional Institution - Rockview, the Nittany Mall, the Pennsylvania Transportation Institute and University Park Airport are large facilities located in the valley. State College, Pennsylvania and the Pennsylvania State University main University Park campus lie at the southern end of the Nittany and Penns Valleys, and this area is also known as "Happy Valley".

== Transportation ==
The Keystone Shortway, now Interstate 80, runs diagonally across the Nittany Valley on a west to east line, from Curtin Gap east of Milesburg, Pennsylvania, to a natural gap in Mount Nittany and then via a deep rock cut along the Long Run stream. The Nittany and Bald Eagle Railroad short line spur that enters the valley from Milesburg, then runs along Spring Creek to Bellefonte, splits, with a track going northeast to Pleasant Gap and another going southwest to Lemont and State College. The spur to Bellefonte follows Pennsylvania Route 144 and the line from Lemont to Pleasant Gap follows Pennsylvania Route 26. Route 26 is the primary north to south route through the valley, and the Interstate 99 extension will also run along its new alignment to I-80.

== Geology ==
Nittany Valley is in the western part of the Ridge and Valley province of the Appalachian Mountains. During the Appalachian orogeny, the sedimentary rock layers folded up into the Nittany Arch anticline. The arch was an ancient Himalayan scale mountain towering above the valley. The oldest rock layers deep within the eroded mountain are now exposed on Sand Ridge in the middle of the valley. Younger rocks from the outer layers of the arch are exposed on the west side of the Bald Eagle Mountain ridge in the Bald Eagle Valley, with the youngest across that valley at the foot of the Allegheny Front. The Nittany Valley, formed where the mountain once stood, is an example of inverse topography.
