= Nittany =

Nittany may refer to:

== Locations ==
- Mount Nittany, a mountain in Centre County, Pennsylvania
- Nittany Valley, a valley between Mount Nittany and Bald Eagle Mountain, in Pennsylvania
- Nittany Arch, a geographic feature in the Appalachian Mountains
- Nittany, Pennsylvania, a town in Centre County, Pennsylvania

== Sports ==
- Penn State Nittany Lions, the sports teams for Pennsylvania State University
  - Nittany Lion, the mascot for said teams
  - The Nittany Lion (song), the school's fight song
  - Nittany Nation, the student cheering section
  - Nittany Lion Shrine, a statue at Pennsylvania State University

== Transportation ==
- Mount Nittany Expressway, an alternative name for U.S. Route 322 as it bypasses State College, Pennsylvania
- Nittany Valley Railroad, a former shortline railroad
- Nittany and Bald Eagle Railroad, a current shortline railroad

== Schools ==
- Bald Eagle-Nittany High School, was a public high school in Mill Hall, Pennsylvania
- Mount Nittany Middle School, a public middle school in College Township, Pennsylvania
- Mount Nittany Elementary School, a public elementary school in College Township

== Other ==
- Nittany Furnace, a former iron furnace in Spring Township, Pennsylvania
- Nittany Lion Inn, hotel in the University Park campus of Penn State
- Nittany Mall, a shopping center in State College, Pennsylvania
- Mount Nittany Medical Center, hospital in College Township
- Nittany apple, a hybrid cultivar of Golden Delicious and York Imperial apples
