= Pennsylvania Furnace, Pennsylvania =

Unincorporated community in Pennsylvania, US

- Unincorporated community
- Location within Pennsylvania Location within the United States
- Coordinates: 40°42′21″N 78°00′13″W
- Country: United States
- State: Pennsylvania
- County: Huntingdon and Centre
- Township: Franklin and Ferguson
- Elevation: 1,089 ft (332 m)
- Time zone: UTC-5 (Eastern (EST))
  - Summer (DST): UTC-4 (EDT)
- ZIP code: 16865
- Area code: 814
- GNIS feature ID: 1183535

Pennsylvania Furnace is an unincorporated community located in Franklin Township, Huntingdon County and in Ferguson Township, Centre County, Pennsylvania, United States. The community is located along Pennsylvania Route 45, 9.7 miles (15.6 km) southwest of State College. Pennsylvania Furnace has a post office, located in Centre County, with ZIP code 16865.

== See also ==
- Warwick Furnace Farms
- Samuel Van Leer
- Pennsylvania Furnace Mansion
