= Bellefonte Furnace =

Hot blast iron furnace located in Bellefonte, Pennsylvania

Coordinates: 40.91014°N 77.79174°W

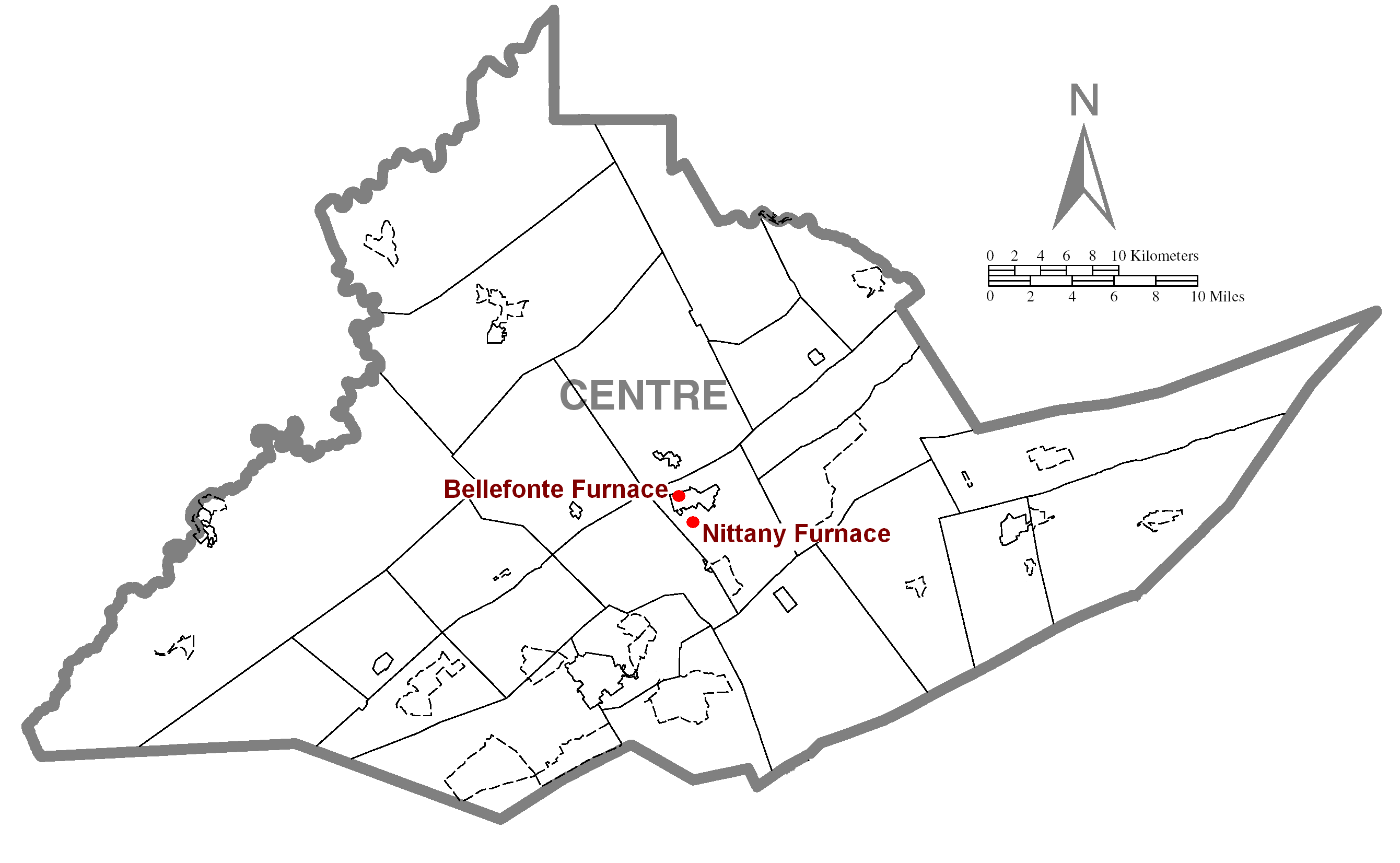
Location of the two hot blast coke furnaces, Bellefonte and Nittany, in Centre County, Pennsylvania.

Bellefonte Furnace was a hot blast iron furnace located in Bellefonte, Pennsylvania. Founded in 1888, it was the first hot blast, coke-fueled iron furnace to be built in Centre County, Pennsylvania. While its founders hoped to transform Centre County's iron industry with modern technology, the furnace struggled to operate at a profit and was out of operation from 1893 until 1899. Thereafter, it operated more or less continuously until 1910, and was demolished four years later. It should not be confused with the charcoal-fueled Bellefonte Furnace and Forge on Logan Branch, which was replaced by Valentine Furnace.

== Founding ==
The Bellefonte Furnace Company was formed in April 1887 by a group of investors from Bellefonte, Hollidaysburg, and Philadelphia. Principal investors included John Reilly, railroad contractors Phil and Tom Collins, and their nephew, Tom Shoemaker. The Collins brothers had already constructed the Buffalo Run, Bellefonte and Bald Eagle Railroad from Bellefonte to Struble, opening up the iron ore deposits of the western Nittany Valley. Building a modern furnace to smelt the ore was a logical extension of their interests, since as yet all the furnaces in Centre County were charcoal-fueled cold blast furnaces.

The new furnace company had ore rights at Blair Bank, near Stormstown, Red Bank, near Scotia, and Johnson Bank, near Struble, and shared rights with the McCoy & Linn iron company at Oreland, to the east of Struble. The BRB&BERR built additional branches to reach these ore pits, extending the Red Bank Branch to Blair and Red Bank and the Oreland Branch to Oreland in 1887. Bellefonte Furnace itself was to be located on the former site of the town fairgrounds, a 12-acre (4.9 ha) site on the northwest edge of town, just south of Buffalo Run.

The furnace and associated buildings were built from brick and limestone quarried along the Oreland Branch. They were designed by Taws & Hartman, a Philadelphia engineering partnership that specialized in the construction of blast furnaces. The furnace complex included a stock house for storing raw materials, the furnace itself, 70 feet (21 m) tall, three stoves and an engine house for heating and pressurizing the hot blast, and a cast house where the molten iron could be formed into castings. (Note: Bezilla & Rudnicki claim the furnace complex included rolling and slitting mills, but these do not appear on the map of the complex they provide, dated 1904, nor in contemporary maps and publications.) The smokestack for the stoves, 153 feet (47 m) high, was the most prominent part of the complex. The BRB&BERR, which ran along the north side of Buffalo Run here and had its shops immediately to the north of the furnace, laid a spur into the furnace complex, with several tracks for delivering supplies and receiving products.

Ore was supplied by the furnace's own ore holdings and by other local miners and was shipped in over the BRB&BERR. Limestone for ironmaking was quarried at a 30-acre (12 ha) site nearby, just north of the BRB&BE shops. Coke was obtained from the Connellsville region. With ample space on the site, slag was dumped in a heap between the furnace and Buffalo Run. When running at full capacity, the furnace could consume 100 short tons (91,000 kg) of limestone, 150 short tons (140,000 kg) of coke, and 225 short tons (204,000 kg) of ore per day and produce 100 short tons (91,000 kg) of iron.

The furnace was first put into blast on January 31, 1888, in a ceremony attended by Bellefonte native and ex-governor Andrew Curtin. Two months later, Valentine Furnace, another hot blast iron furnace, had also gone into blast on the south side of Bellefonte. While Valentine Furnace was operated separately from Bellefonte Furnace, Shoemaker and the Collins brothers had engineered and built the Nittany Valley Railroad, which supplied ore to Valentine Furnace.

With Bellefonte and Valentine Furnaces both in blast, the Beech Creek Railroad began to consider an extension to tap the furnace traffic from Bellefonte. However, all was not well with the iron firms. A statewide construction boom had led to a surplus of ironmaking capacity, depressing prices. Both furnaces were also suffering from a shortage of ore. The Nittany Valley hematite banks could not supply enough ore to run Bellefonte Furnace at more than 80% of capacity, a reduction in its economy of scale that made it unprofitable to run with the depression in iron prices. High freight rates discouraged buying ore from more distant local mines. On January 31, 1891, Bellefonte Furnace went out of blast for maintenance. A strike during the spring pushed up the price of coke, and the furnace remained idle. With Bellefonte Furnace cold, the BRB&BERR lost two-thirds of its trade, and was thrown into bankruptcy in July.

== Reorganization ==
The ensuing reorganization of the BRB&BERR brought the railroad under separate management from the furnace. The bondholders did not choose to reinstate Reilly, who remained president of the furnace company. Reilly and the Collins brothers clashed with the railroad, now reorganized as the Bellefonte Central Railroad, over freight rates. The railroad would not ship ore for less than 30 cents per ton, which Phil Collins considered too high to operate the furnace profitably. Despite this dispute, Tom Shoemaker remained superintendent of both the railroad and the furnace company. The two companies were unable to come to terms until July 1892, when a meeting between Reilly and Frazer in Philadelphia persuaded the latter to grant the furnace a rate of 20 cents per ton from nearby banks and 25 cents for those further up the line. With this assurance, Reilly began to repair the furnace, rehire workers, and raise money for payroll. It went back into blast in April 1893. With the furnace starting back up, Shoemaker, who was also running a mining company at Graysdale, found himself overwhelmed with responsibilities and resigned from the railroad in May 1893 to devote his time to his other enterprises. However, shortly after his departure, the Panic of 1893 rattled American industry. In the financial shock that followed, Bellefonte Furnace once again found it impossible to make iron at a profit, and went out of blast again in July 1893. With Bellefonte Furnace out of blast and Valentine Furnace operating only sporadically, the Bellefonte Central began to remove some of the ore mine branches. The Oreland Branch had already been removed in 1892 to lay track into State College, the siding to Johnson Bank was removed in 1894, and the Red Bank Branch beyond Graysdale in 1896. The railroad considered buying the furnace, but found John Reilly's terms unsatisfactory.

== The Gephart era ==
In a surprise announcement on May 5, 1899, J. Wesley Gephart, a prominent local businessman and sometime president of the Valentine Iron Company, announced that he had collected New York and Philadelphia capitalists to invest in and restart the furnace. Gephart assumed the presidency of the new Bellefonte Furnace Company, which owned the furnace and the ore leases at Mattern Bank and Red Bank. Furthermore, Gephart revealed that the company had bought the large ore deposits at Scotia from Carnegie Steel to augment the furnace's ore reserves. Gephart's Central Railroad of Pennsylvania was to build a trestle across Spring Creek to reach the plant. John Reilly was retained as vice president, and Tom Shoemaker was one of the directors. The furnace was relit on July 24, 1899, for the first time in six years.

Because of the removal of the Red Bank Branch in 1896, Bellefonte Furnace initially began receiving ore via a roundabout route, shipping over the Scotia Branch and Fairbrook Branch of the Pennsylvania Railroad to Tyrone, and then north over the Bald Eagle Branch to Bellefonte. To shorten the route, the Bellefonte Central quickly laid a new Scotia Branch of 1.4 miles (2.3 km) from Graysdale to Scotia, where a narrow gauge line owned by the furnace company hauled ore from Red Bank to the Scotia washer. Ore from both pits was cleaned and shipped from Scotia, the first train leaving on October 31, 1899. The Bellefonte Central also rebuilt the Red Bank Branch from Graysdale to Mattern Bank, which opened August 11, 1899.

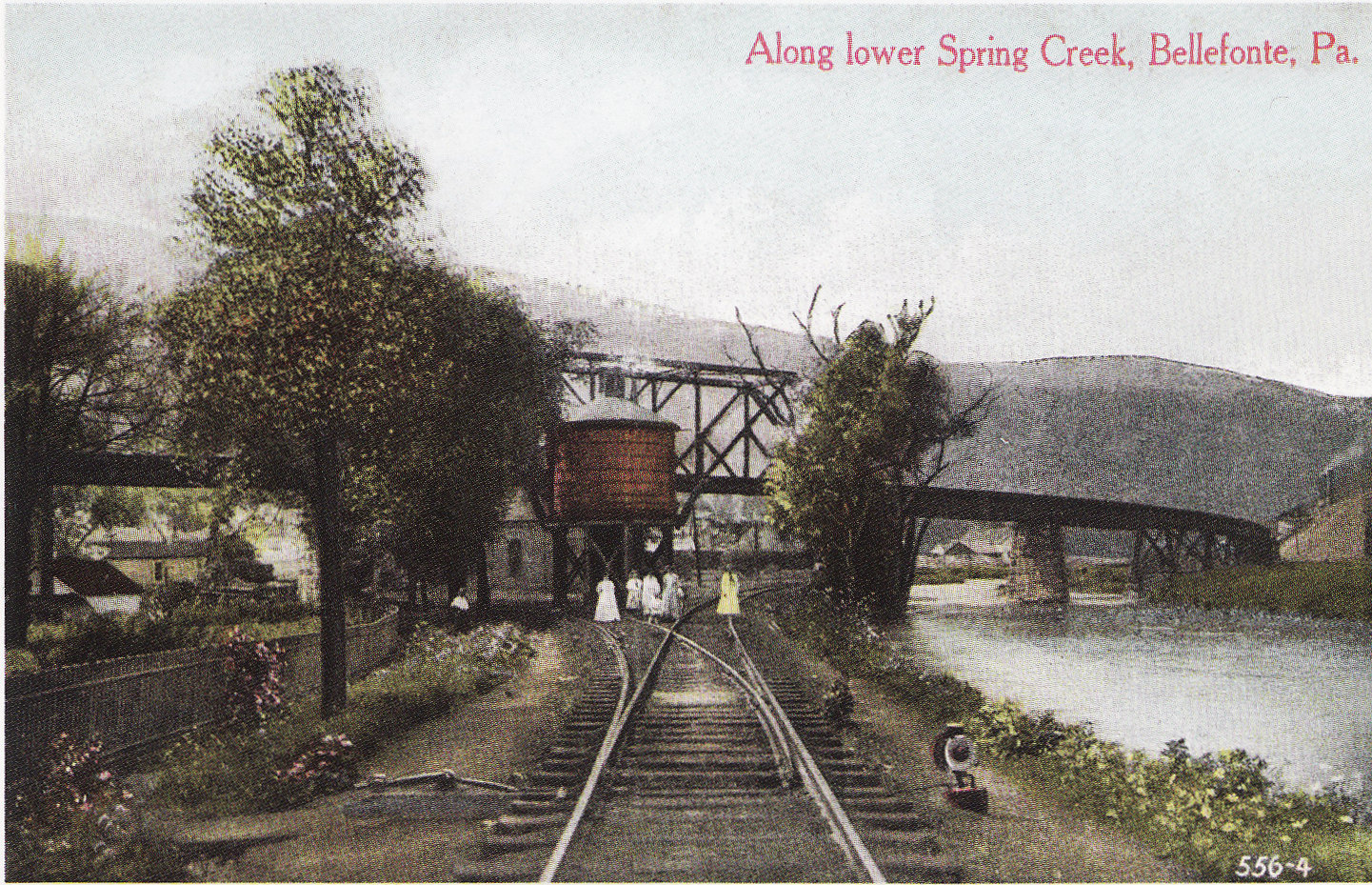
Bridge over Spring Creek and the PRR on the Central Railroad's Furnace Branch.

After a confrontation with the PRR's assistant superintendent for the Tyrone Division, Gephart's men began work on the Furnace Branch of the Central Railroad in May 1899. The bridge was completed and placed in service on July 17, 1899. With the new connection in place, Bellefonte Furnace could now ship pig iron either via the Bellefonte Central and the PRR or by the Central Railroad and the Beech Creek Railroad (part of the New York Central system), giving it leverage for better freight rates. It also gave the railroad easy access to a Gephart-owned lime quarry at Salona, on the Central Railroad.

Ominously, however, the furnace shut down for repairs during summer 1900. As before, the effects of the shutdown rippled through the economy of Bellefonte, with workers at the ore pits and the lime quarry at Salona and railroad crews being furloughed. The furnace did, however, return to blast on schedule on September 27, 1900. Valentine, now Nittany Furnace, was also closed at the time, but Gephart and another group of investors bought this furnace as well in December. It would, however, be managed separately from Bellefonte Furnace. Gephart announced that Bellefonte Furnace would be run more steadily than Nittany, which would only be operated at peak periods.

Despite Gephart's success in attracting investors, the iron markets remained weak, and Bellefonte Furnace closed down in June. Repairs were under way to bring it back into blast by September 1904. It was back in blast again by the end of October. Gephart's death the next year robbed his numerous enterprises of leadership, although it brought Bellefonte and Nittany Furnaces under a single management. They were still owned by different parties, and Bellefonte Furnace benefited somewhat from being tied to the Central Railroad of Pennsylvania. However, the Panic of 1907 proved to be the final blow for the iron industry in Bellefonte. Bellefonte Furnace went out of blast for the last time on December 21, 1910. For the time being, its most remunerative asset was its pile of furnace slag, which was used by Tom Shoemaker in the construction of a PRR railroad yard in Northumberland, Pennsylvania. In 1914, the furnace and its ore holdings were sold to the John Lowber Welsh estate, one of its bondholders. The furnace was demolished for scrap in 1915, and the ore pits were shut down and the company houses there dismantled. The Central Railroad of Pennsylvania was dealt a mortal blow by the loss of the furnace traffic. Under the presidency of Gephart's son, it struggled on for a few more years before abandonment in 1918.

== Legacy ==
Bellefonte Furnace did not live up to the sanguine expectations of its original investors. Bellefonte, where iron furnaces had prospered since the 18th Century, appeared to enjoy all the advantages necessary for successful iron production: ample iron ore to be mined, limestone in abundance, easy access to coke from Connellsville and the Snow Shoe region by rail. Why, then, did the furnace struggle financially during its initial period of operation? Gephart thought the key lay in railroad rates, so he built the Central Railroad of Pennsylvania to break the PRR's monopoly on traffic from Bellefonte. Certainly Bellefonte Furnace was more successful under his leadership, shipping over the Central Railroad, then under the Collins brothers and Shoemaker, successful businessmen in other areas.

However, by the end of the furnace's lifetime, other problems had become apparent. The pig iron market was already in decline by the time the furnace was built in 1888, with prices rarely rising above $22 per ton until World War I. But it was the rise of the integrated steel plant that really sealed the fate of Bellefonte's furnaces. As steel producers increasingly made their own iron and converted it to steel on site, the utility of merchant pig producers such as Bellefonte Furnace dwindled. Easily mined, high-grade Mesabi Range iron ore negated the advantage of the local deposits in the Nittany Valley; in fact, it was the availability of Mesabi ore that led Carnegie to sell the Scotia mines to Gephart.

Gephart's prestige and ability to attract investors were able to keep Bellefonte and Nittany Furnace and the associated railroads and ore mines active. But this was an Indian summer of prosperity for Bellefonte. The lime industry, though increasingly important for the region, was unable to sustain the prosperity that iron had brought to Bellefonte, making it the county seat and the cradle of governors Curtin and Beaver. The closing of the iron furnaces represented but one step in the decline of Bellefonte and its replacement by State College as the principal community of Centre County.
