= Edmund Blanchard =

American lawyer

Edmund Blanchard (c.1824 – December 27, 1886) was a lawyer and prominent businessman in Centre County, Pennsylvania. He was an early promoter of rail transportation in the area.

== Early life ==
The son of John Blanchard and Mary Miles, Blanchard was born in Bellefonte, Pennsylvania and educated at Dartmouth College. At one time a law partner of Andrew Curtin, he also served as district attorney for Centre County and subsequently became senior partner of the corporate law firm Blanchard and Blanchard, the other principal being his brother Evan. Blanchard & Blanchard's clients included the Bellefonte and Snowshoe Railroad and the Bald Eagle Valley Railroad.

== Promotion of rail transport ==
Blanchard had been an early investor in the Bellefonte & Snowshoe, and served as a director of the Tyrone and Lock Haven Railroad. This company was reorganized as the Bald Eagle Valley Railroad, of which he served as treasurer. Blanchard's history with these lines put him on good terms with Pennsylvania Railroad officials, who financed the Bald Eagle Valley and later took control of both that railroad and the Bellefonte & Snowshoe. Blanchard's other business interests included the Bellefonte Glass Works, the Bellefonte Car Works, and the Moshannon Land and Lumber Co.

Because of his connections, Blanchard headed a group of Centre County businessmen that, in 1881, appealed to President George B. Roberts of the PRR to build a branch from Bellefonte to the iron ore deposits at Scotia. Blanchard and his associates saw the line as key to cutting transportation costs to bring ore to the blast furnaces at Bellefonte, and hired Samuel Brugger to survey a route from Bellefonte to Scotia, with a branch to State College.

However, the PRR declined to act on the proposal, as it considered the group's estimates of ore production at Scotia and in the Buffalo Run Valley to be over-optimistic. Undeterred, Blanchard and other interested parties chartered the Bellefonte and Buffalo Run Railroad in 1882 to build the proposed lines, under the presidency of Blanchard. His legal skill was crucial in helping the new railroad acquire some of its right-of-way affordably through eminent domain.

== Later life ==
Heart disease forced Blanchard to scale back his activities in 1885, and he stepped down from the presidency of the Bellefonte & Buffalo Run when it was consolidated to form the Buffalo Run, Bellefonte and Bald Eagle Railroad, although he remained a director of the latter. With the railroad well underway in 1886, Blanchard secured Philadelphia investment to build a new iron furnace in Bellefonte. The Centre Iron Company began work on a hot blast furnace on Logan Branch, at the site of the former Bellefonte (charcoal) Furnace, in fall 1886. Blanchard and his associates also organized the Valentine Ore Land Association to mine ore, mostly from banks in the Nittany Valley to the east, and the Nittany Valley Railroad to transport it. However, Blanchard did not live to see Valentine Furnace go into blast in 1888. He succumbed to heart disease on December 27, 1886. His sons, Evan Miles and John, succeeded to his law practice and would later represent the Bellefonte Central Railroad, successor to the BRB&BE, in litigation.
