= Catherine Furnace, Virginia =

Unincorporated community in Virginia, US

Coordinates: 38°33′27″N 78°38′08″W

Catherine Furnace is an unincorporated community in Page County, in the U.S. state of Virginia. The earned its name from the blast furnace of the same name, built in 1846, by the Forrer family.
