= Huntingdon Furnace =

- U.S. National Register of Historic Places
- U.S. Historic district
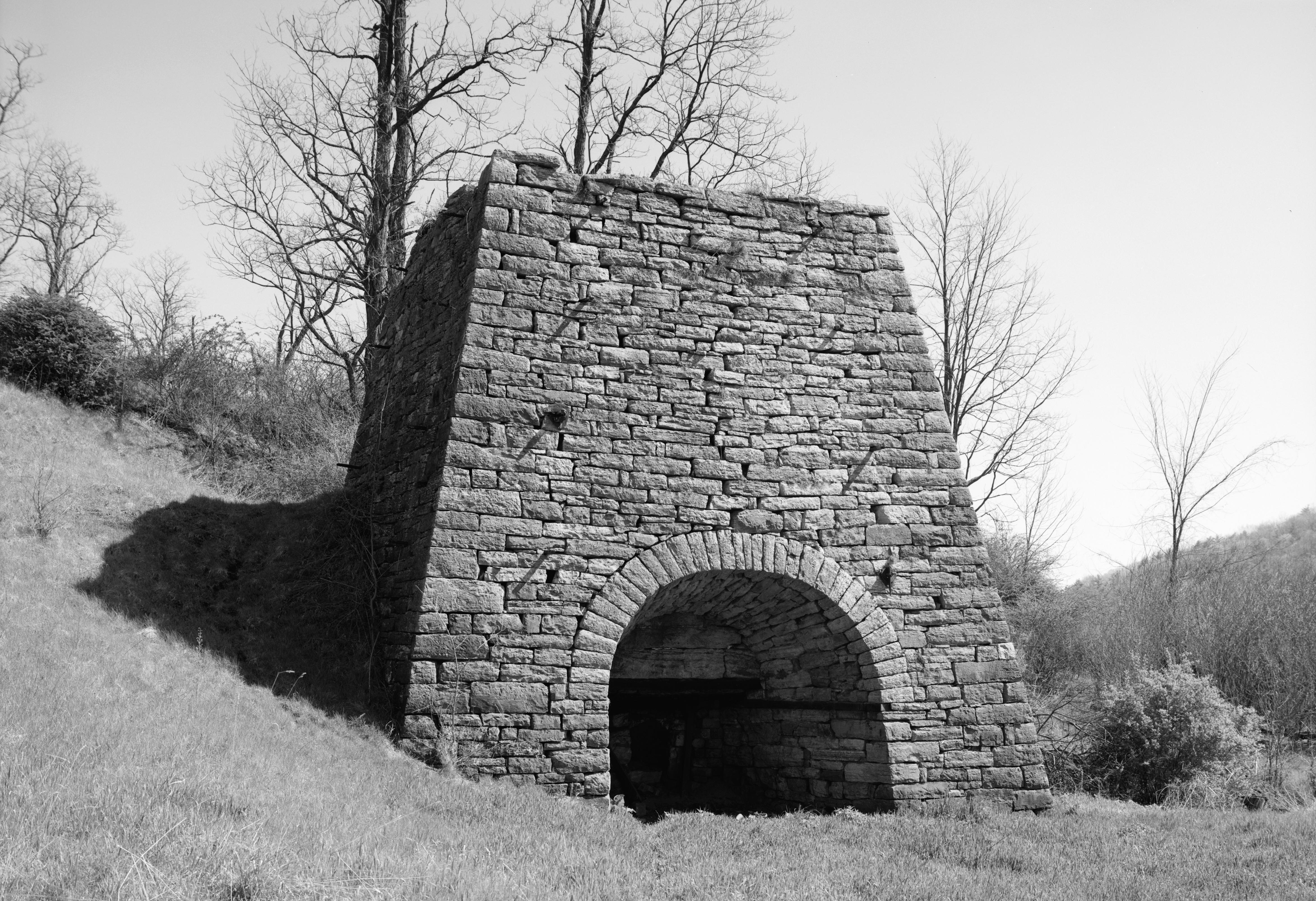
- Huntingdon Furnace, May 1989

- Location within Pennsylvania Location within the United States
- Location: Township Road 31106 northwest of Franklinville, 2 miles (3.2 km) northwest of its junction with Pennsylvania Route 45, Franklin Township, Pennsylvania
- Coordinates: 40°39′29″N 78°06′54″W
- Area: 35 acres (14 ha)
- Architectural style: Federal
- MPS: Industrial Resources of Huntingdon County, 1780--1939 MPS
- NRHP reference No.: 90000407
- Added to NRHP: March 20, 1990

Huntingdon Furnace is a national historic district and historic iron furnace and associated buildings located in Franklin Township, Huntingdon County, Pennsylvania, United States. It consists of seven contributing buildings and one contributing structure. They are the iron furnace, office building, the ironmaster's mansion, log worker's house, a residence, the farm manager's residence, the grist mill and the miller's house. The iron furnace was moved to this site in 1805, from its original site one mile upstream. It measures 30 feet square by 30 feet high. The ironmaster's mansion was built in 1851, and is a 2 1/2-story, L-shaped frame dwelling. The grist mill dates to 1808, and is a 3 1/2-story, rubble stone building measuring 50 feet by 45 feet. The furnace was in operation from 1796, until it ceased operations in the 1880s.

It was listed on the National Register of Historic Places in 1990.
