= J. Wesley Gephart =

American lawyer

John Wesley Gephart (May 25, 1853 – February 14, 1905) was a Bellefonte, Pennsylvania lawyer and industrialist. Educated in Bellefonte and at Princeton University, Gephart's diligence and intelligence were already marked when he was admitted to the bar at the end of 1876 and joined the Bellefonte law practice of James A. Beaver in 1877. He took a prominent part in the civic and moral life of the town, and enjoyed a reputation as a skillful lawyer and charismatic orator. In 1891, he became president of the newly organized Valentine Iron Company, and thereafter became increasingly devoted to furthering industry and commerce in his home town. He laid aside his legal practice in 1893, after becoming the superintendent of the new Central Railroad of Pennsylvania, to become a full-time industrialist.

His energies were primarily directed towards the promotion of the iron industry in Bellefonte, and the development of railroads to serve it, although he was also an active participant in Bellefonte's civic life, especially the YMCA. He more than once clashed with the Pennsylvania Railroad, which had previously enjoyed a monopoly on rail service to Bellefonte. Gephart proved highly successful in attracting outside capital to Bellefonte-area enterprises. At the peak of his fortunes, he supervised the town's two major blast furnaces, the Central Railroad of Pennsylvania, many of the iron ore banks in the Nittany Valley, and additional mines and quarries that fed the furnaces. However, competition with steel mills proved insurmountable for these businesses, and most were either dismantled or moribund within a decade after his death in 1905.

== Early life and legal practice ==
"Wes" Gephart, as he was known to his contemporaries, was born in Millheim, Pennsylvania, a town in Penns Valley. His parents were John P. Gephart, a well-to-do local farmer, and Mary (Swartz) Gephart. He was educated at the Bellefonte Academy and Princeton University. Gephart paid his way through college in part by working as a printer, having learned the trade at the Bellefonte Watchman in his youth. He graduated from Princeton with honors in 1874, and was named a Boudinot fellow in history.

Gephart returned to Bellefonte to study law under James A. Beaver, and was admitted to the bar on December 13, 1876. A contemporary newspaper account praised his diligence and "retentive memory." On January 7, 1877, he joined Beaver's law practice, thereafter conducted under the name of Beaver and Gephart. John M. Dale joined the partnership ten years later, around the time of Beaver's election as governor. Gephart enjoyed an excellent income from his law practice, and was highly regarded as a lawyer and orator. He took part in the local civic life as an officer of the Centennial Temperance Club, and as a member of the local Presbyterian church, where he was Sunday school superintendent. Gephart married Ella M. Hays on October 23, 1879, in Bellefonte. They had three children: Wallace Hays, William Wilson, and Elizabeth.

In 1884, he reported himself to be a "Conservative Democrat," but unlike his law partner, Beaver, did not aspire to political office. Gephart also declared himself in favor of a tariff "adjusted so as to protect and encourage industries needing it, but not to foster monopolies." The twin themes of encouraging industry and antipathy to monopoly would color much of his later career. His support for a protective tariff led him to publicly break with the Democratic Party in 1888 and endorse Benjamin Harrison's candidacy for president, much to the discomfiture of Centre County Democrats. In 1889, Governor Beaver appointed Gephart one of the Commonwealth's commissioners to the Exposition Universelle.

== Valentine Iron and the Central Railroad ==
Gephart began his career as a Bellefonte industrialist at the end of 1890. The Centre Iron Company, operators of Valentine Furnace, went bankrupt and was sold under foreclosure in November 1890. Gephart was named president of the Valentine Iron Company, which was chartered January 23, 1891, to take over Centre Iron's property on behalf of the bondholders and re-open Valentine Furnace. Valentine Iron also leased the Nittany Valley Railroad, which carried ore from Taylor Bank to the Furnace. Gephart became the railroad's general manager. The new iron company soon became enmeshed in a dispute with the Pennsylvania Railroad over the high freight rates on traffic to and from the furnace. The only railroad outlet for the furnace was the Bald Eagle Valley Railroad, which had been leased by the PRR since the Civil War. This monopoly allowed the PRR to set freight rates to and from the furnace at its pleasure, and the rates it imposed on Valentine Iron were significantly higher than those charged to Centre Iron, its predecessor. The high rates threatened to make the furnace economically uncompetitive, and Valentine Iron began lobbying the PRR for relief. Gephart had become a director of the Bald Eagle Valley in about 1890, perhaps to strengthen his negotiating position.

After eighteen months of negotiations failed to yield a satisfactory result, Gephart was able to persuade Valentine Iron's main stockholders to adopt a new plan to save the company. In February 1893, they agreed to help finance a competing railroad into Bellefonte to carry their iron traffic. Gephart and his backers chose to take over the Central Railroad of Pennsylvania, which had a charter from Mill Hall to Bellefonte but which had only managed to complete 0.5 miles (0.80 km) of grading at the Mill Hall end. Gephart arranged for the issue and sale of $600,000 in fifteen-year bonds of the railroad to Drexel and Company to finance its completion, and he was named superintendent of the railroad in June 1893. Under his direction, construction work resumed in July 1893, and the 27.3-mile (43.9 km) line was completed to Bellefonte. It crossed the Nittany Valley Railroad in what is now the suburb of Park View Heights, established an interchange, and began to operate the Nittany Valley under a five-year lease. In November 1893, Gephart resigned from his law practice to devote his full attention to Valentine Iron and the success of the Central Railroad of Pennsylvania. The railroad ran its first freight train on December 6, followed by its first passenger train on December 18. The Bellefonte Board of Trade celebrated the opening of the railroad with a lavish banquet at the Bush House in Bellefonte on December 22. Attendees included not only local businessmen and officials of the Central Railroad, but officials from nearby railroads such as the Reading, the Beech Creek, the Williamsport and North Branch Railroad and the Buffalo, Rochester and Pittsburgh Railway; E.T. Stotesbury, of Drexel & Co., the Central's bondholder; and two Bellefonte natives and ex-Governors, Curtin and Beaver. As one of the principal honorees, Gephart delivered a speech on the "Future of Bellefonte," and "Canvasback duck à la Gephart" was among the dishes on the menu.

The triumphal completion of the Central Railroad notwithstanding, Gephart was to find the Pennsylvania Railroad was not so easily defeated. In September 1893, as construction on the Central Railroad was still underway, the PRR brought suit against the Valentine Iron Company. In 1887, the PRR, through its Bellefonte, Nittany & Lemont subsidiary, had agreed to help finance the Centre Iron Company in exchange for exclusive rights to its traffic. It argued that this covenant remained binding on Valentine Iron as the successor to Centre Iron. Gephart won a victory in the first round of the case in January 1894, but the PRR appealed to the Supreme Court of Pennsylvania. At some point during 1894, as the litigation wound on, Gephart ceased to be a director of the Bald Eagle Valley. In 1895, the Supreme Court overturned the lower court's verdict and granted an injunction to prevent Valentine Iron from shipping over the Central Railroad. The Central Railroad also surrendered its lease of the Nittany Valley Railroad as a result of the new verdict. Stung by the ruling, Gephart declared that the iron company was "jeopardized" without access to "competitive railroad facilities" and resigned the presidency of Valentine Iron (and from the Nittany Valley Railroad) in an open letter to Bellefonte's business community in November 1895. He remained superintendent of the Central Railroad, which suffered financially by the loss of the iron traffic.

Seeking to boost traffic on the Central Railroad, Gephart was probably also involved in the chartering of the Bellefonte and Clearfield Railroad in December 1895. While not an officer, Gephart was understood to be the principal figure behind this railroad, and its officers included his brother-in-law, Lorenzo Terbal Munson, and John P. Harris, who was a stockholder of the Central Railroad and Gephart's successor at Valentine Iron. This line would have connected the Central Railroad, at Bellefonte, with the Buffalo, Rochester and Pittsburgh Railway at Clearfield, Pennsylvania. By passing through the Clearfield Coalfield, the proposed railroad could have brought bituminous coal and coke down to the furnaces at Bellefonte. However, the projected expense of construction up the Allegheny Front meant that the Bellefonte & Clearfield remained a paper railroad.

== Resurgence and death ==
Gephart was not daunted by these reverses. Operating surreptitiously, he assembled a consortium of New York and Philadelphia investors, who formed the Bellefonte Furnace Company in May 1899 to take over the operations of Bellefonte Furnace, idle since the Panic of 1893. Gephart was named president of the new company, whose assets included not only the furnace and its historic ore sources at Mattern Bank and Red Bank, but the Scotia ore deposits, acquired from the Carnegie Steel Company after it switched to Mesabi Range ore. Gephart also obtained a charter for the Bellefonte Lime Company in September 1899, which bought the Morris lime quarry at Salona, Pennsylvania, on the Central Railroad of Pennsylvania. In addition to Gephart, the organizers included L. T. Munson, John P. Harris, and Charles M. Clement, president of the Central Railroad. The new company was to supply limestone to Bellefonte Furnace, and to the Beech Creek Railroad for ballast.

However, Bellefonte Furnace was not on the line of the Central Railroad of Pennsylvania; it lay across Spring Creek in Coleville, on the tracks of the Bellefonte Central Railroad. Gephart attempted to negotiate a new connection with, and trackage rights over, the Bellefonte Central to allow the Central Railroad to reach the furnace, but was rebuffed. Instead, Gephart announced that the Central Railroad would build its own branch directly to the furnace. The new branch would cross Spring Creek and the PRR line to reach Bellefonte Furnace and a connection with the Bellefonte Central's tracks. Its construction was delayed when the assistant superintendent of the PRR's Tyrone Division attempted to forcibly block the construction of the bridge piers on either side of the PRR right-of-way by dumping coal and rubbish into their foundations. A few days later, however, Gephart had the last word in the matter: PRR executives arrived to announce that the Central Railroad's construction had been properly authorized, and had the obstructions removed at their own railroad's expense. The new branch was opened in July 1899. Revival of the Bellefonte & Clearfield was expected at this time, but never took place.

Gephart's coup in restarting Bellefonte Furnace was repeated in 1900 with the revival of the former Valentine Furnace, now known as Nittany Furnace. After Gephart left the presidency in 1895, the furnace, the Nittany Valley Railroad, and associated ore lands had come into the hands of the Empire Steel and Iron Company. However, Empire essentially abandoned Nittany Furnace in April 1900, allowing the Commonwealth Trust Company, which held a lien on the property, to buy it at a sheriff's sale. As with Bellefonte Furnace, Gephart assembled a group of Eastern investors to purchase the furnace from Commonwealth Trust and rehabilitate it. The new company had the furnace back in blast on June 5, 1902. However, Gephart only anticipated running Nittany Furnace during times of peak market demand for iron.

Gephart was also involved in more diverse business enterprises. In 1901, he was a director of the American Central Contracting Company, whose board included other railroad and coal investors. On April 24, 1903, Gephart obtained a charter for the Bellefonte Coal and Coke Company, which bought a tract of 1,100 acres (450 ha) of coal land near Winslow, Jefferson County, Pennsylvania, on the Pennsylvania and North Western Railroad. Coke ovens were planned there, which would have provided fuel for the two furnaces.

Among all his business activity, Gephart still found time to take part in the civic life of the community. He organized a subscription drive to get the Bellefonte YMCA out of debt in October 1895. He was a director of the organization in 1904, when the YMCA was raising funds for a new building. In 1903, he was vice-president of the newly organized Nittany Country Club. Gephart was also a trustee of his alma mater, the Bellefonte Academy.

Wes Gephart died suddenly at his home in Bellefonte, of a stroke, on February 14, 1905. Contemporary obituaries praised his "indomitable energy and perseverance," an "active influence" in the church, Sunday school, and YMCA, and asserted that "no one living in Bellefonte...could interest and command capital as Mr. Gephart did." After his death, Bellefonte and Nittany Furnaces, though owned by separate groups of investors, came under a single management. The Bellefonte Furnace investors were more closely tied to the Central Railroad, and that furnace operated somewhat more frequently than Nittany, to generate traffic for the railroad. The superintendency of the Central Railroad was assumed by Gephart's son Wallace, who was soon made its president.

However, Gephart's industrial empire would not long survive him. The formation of large, vertically integrated firms such as U.S. Steel and Bethlehem Steel made independent blast furnaces such as Bellefonte and Nittany increasingly uneconomical to run. The Panic of 1907 proved to be the final blow for the furnaces, which operated only sporadically afterwards. Bellefonte Furnace went out of blast for the last time in December 1910; Nittany Furnace, in January 1911. The Central Railroad survived a little longer, but it could not cover its operating expenses without the traffic provided by the iron furnaces. Its last train ran in November 1918.

== Notes ==
- A: Bezilla & Rudnicki give a graduation date of 1873, but this is contradicted by contemporary sources.
- B: Beaver was then practicing law as McAllister and Beaver, although his senior partner, Hugh McAllister, had died in 1873.
- C: While the furnace was served by the Nittany Valley Railroad and was not far from the Buffalo Run, Bellefonte and Bald Eagle Railroad (later the Bellefonte Central), both of these railroads extended only to outlying ore mines and did not connect with the national rail network except via the Bald Eagle Valley Railroad.
- D: Not to be confused with the Bellefonte Lime Company of the late 20th century, which took over the Bellefonte Lime Division of the Warner Company in 1986.

== Bibliography ==
- Beers, J.H. (1898). Commemorative Biographical Record of Central Pennsylvania. Chicago: J.H. Beers & Co.
- Bezilla, Michael; Rudnicki, Jack (2007). Rails to Penn State: The Story of the Bellefonte Central. Stackpole Books. ISBN 978-0-8117-0231-7.
- John Rogers Williams (1902). Academic Honors in Princeton University. Princeton University. p. 88.
- Decennial Record of the Class of 1874 of Princeton College. The Princeton Press. 1884. pp. 40–42.
