= Spruce Creek Rod and Gun Club =

- U.S. National Register of Historic Places
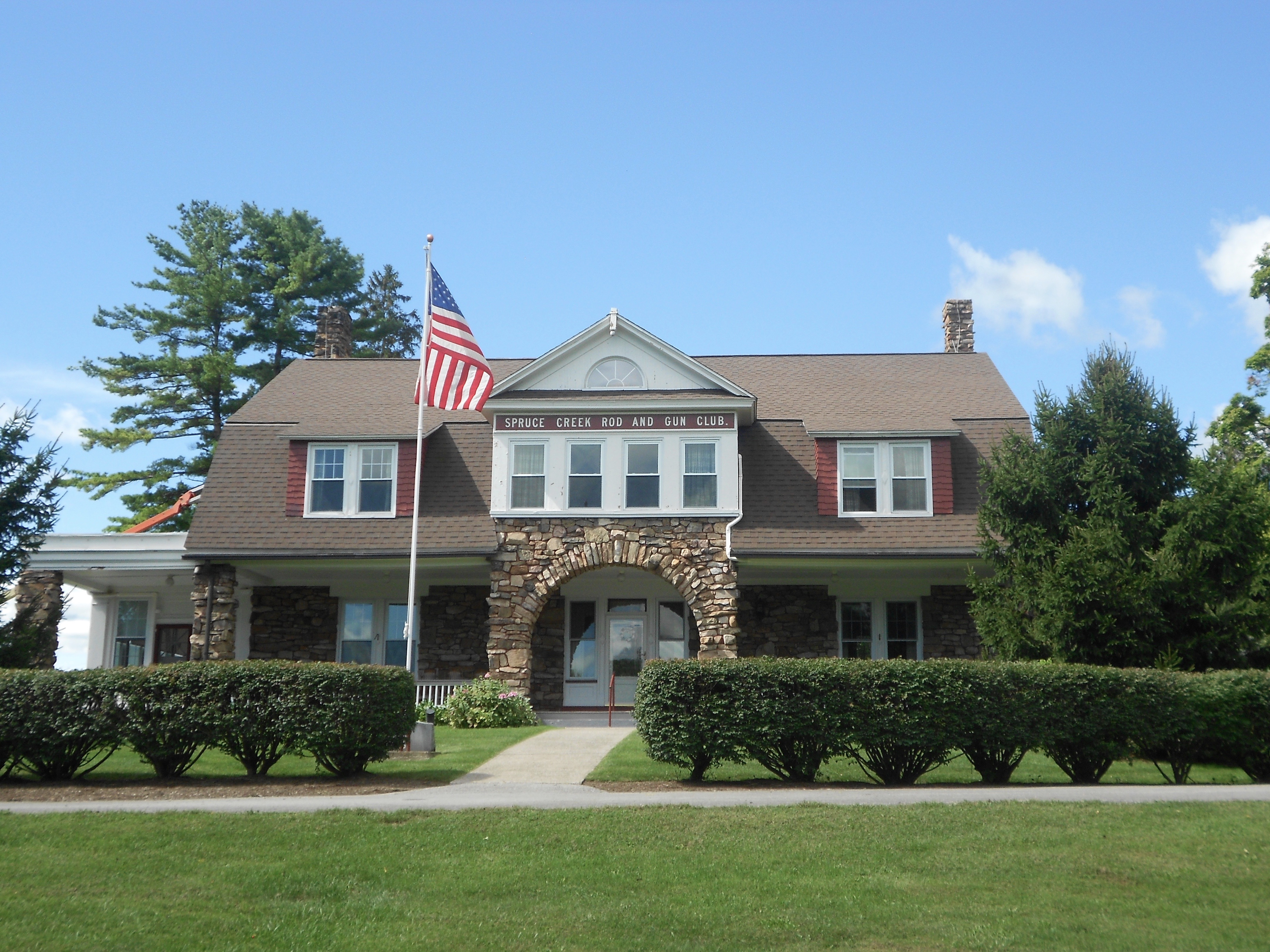

- Location within Pennsylvania Location within the United States
- Location: Pennsylvania Route 45, northeast of Franklinville (6501 Clubhouse Lane), Franklin Township, Pennsylvania
- Coordinates: 40°40′28″N 78°02′52″W
- Area: 10 acres (4.0 ha)
- Built: 1905
- Architect: Schollar & Hersh
- Architectural style: Colonial Revival
- NRHP reference No.: 91000228
- Added to NRHP: February 28, 1991

The Spruce Creek Rod and Gun Club is a historic, American clubhouse and associated outbuilding complex that is located in Franklin Township, Huntingdon County, Pennsylvania.

It was added to the National Register of Historic Places in 1991.

== History and architectural features ==
This clubhouse was built in 1905 and has a two-and-one-half-story main section with a two-story ell. It was built using local fieldstone and lumber, and has gambrel roofs with dormers. The building was designed in the Colonial Revival style. Also located on the property is a stone generator building (1906-1908), an ice house, and a garage/carriage house (1908-1909) with a long, shed addition (1920s). The club was founded by prominent businessmen who resided primarily in Altoona, Pennsylvania.
