= Colerain Forges Mansion =

Historic house in Pennsylvania, United States

- U.S. National Register of Historic Places
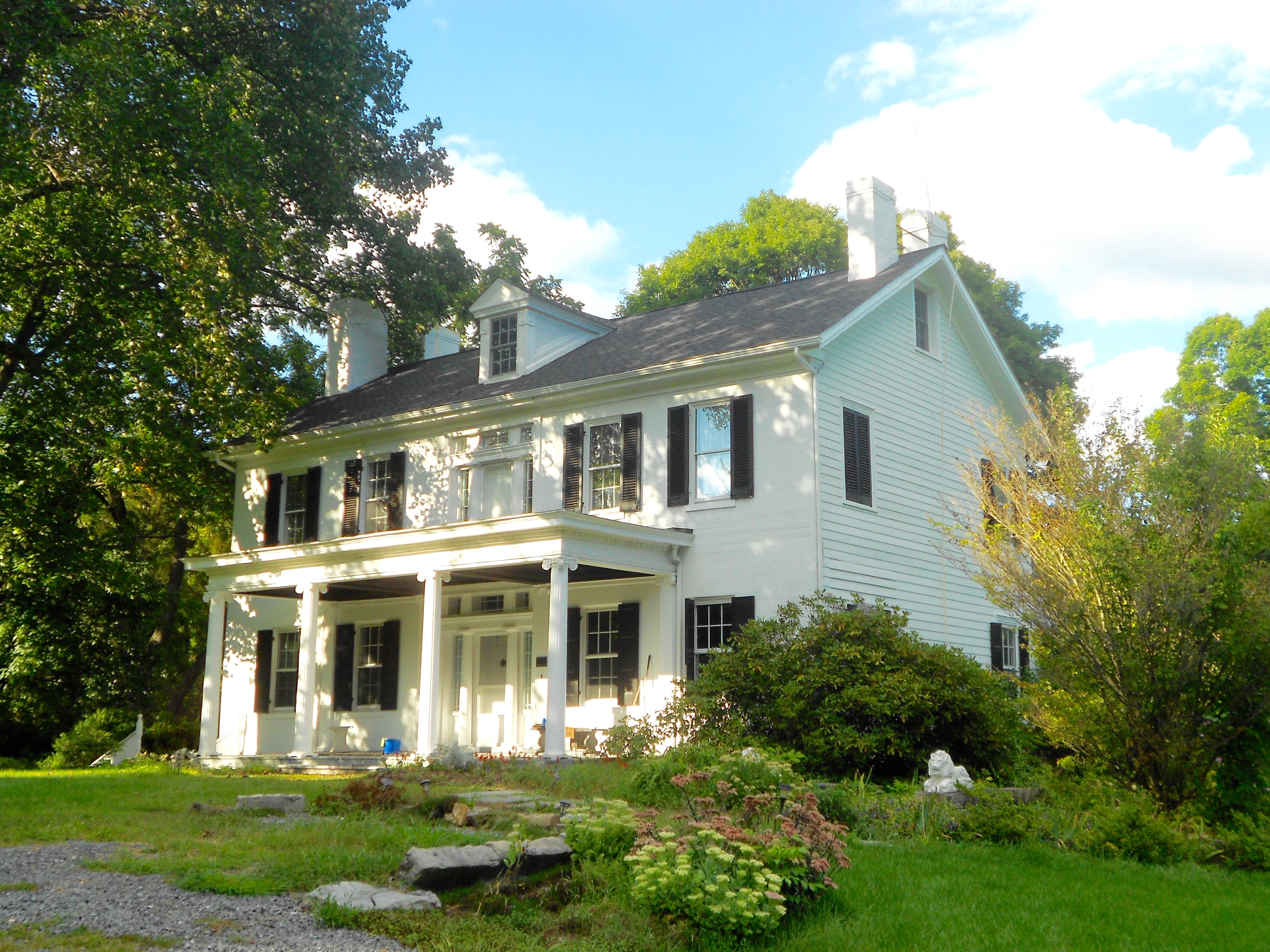

- Location within Pennsylvania Location within the United States
- Location: Pennsylvania Route 45, 0.75 miles (1.21 km) south of Franklinville, Franklin Township, Pennsylvania
- Coordinates: 40°38′20″N 78°6′0″W
- Area: 5 acres (2.0 ha)
- Built: 1810, 1860
- Architectural style: Federal
- MPS: Industrial Resources of Huntingdon County, 1780--1939 MPS
- NRHP reference No.: 90000406
- Added to NRHP: March 20, 1990

The Colerain Forges Mansion is a historic home located at Franklin Township in Huntingdon County, Pennsylvania.

It was built in four stages between the late-18th century and mid- to late-19th century. It appears as a two-story, five-bay, T-shaped dwelling with a one-story, full-length porch in the Federal style. The oldest section is the two-story, plastered midsection. The frame portion to the east dates to the 1830s, and the brick section to the west to the 1840s. The rear section dates to the 1860s-1870s, and is a two-story board-and-batten structure. Also on the property is a 2 1/2-story, gable roofed stone outbuilding and a small board-and-batten shed. The house was built as the ironmaster's mansion at Colerain Forge.

It was listed on the National Register of Historic Places in 1990. The house and property are currently managed by a nonprofit, the Colerain Center for Education, Preservation, and the Arts.
