= Glen Wilton, Virginia =

Glen Wilton
- Census-designated place
- Location within the Commonwealth of Virginia Glen Wilton (the United States)
- Coordinates: 37°45′10″N 79°49′08″W
- Country: United States
- State: Virginia
- County: Botetourt

Area
  - Total: 0.434 sq mi (1.12 km^{2})
  - Land: 0.428 sq mi (1.11 km^{2})
  - Water: 0.006 sq mi (0.016 km^{2})

Population (2020)
  - Total: 129
  - Density: 301/sq mi (116/km^{2})
- Time zone: UTC−5 (Eastern (EST))
  - Summer (DST): UTC−4 (EDT)
- ZIP codes: 24085 (Eagle Rock); 24438 (Glen Wilton)
- Area codes: 540 and 826

Glen Wilton is a census-designated place (CDP) in northern Botetourt County, Virginia, United States. The population was 129 at the 2020 census. The CDP is located along the James River, between Eagle Rock and Iron Gate. It is part of the Roanoke metropolitan area.

== History ==
Callie Furnace was listed on the National Register of Historic Places in 1974.

== Geography ==
Glen Wilton is located at 37°45′10″N 79°49′08″W (37.7554874, −079.8213753).

According to the United States Census Bureau, the CDP has a total area of 0.434 square miles.

== Demographics ==
Historical population
Census	Pop.	Note	%±
2020	129		—
Source: U.S. Census Bureau

Glen Wilton first appeared as a census designated place in the 2020 U.S. census.

As of the census of 2020, there were 129 people residing in the CDP. The population density was 300 people per square mile (120 people/km^{2}). There were 57 housing units. The racial makeup of the CDP was 96.9% White, 2.3% Black or African American, 0% Native American, 0% Asian, 0% Pacific Islander, 0% from other races, and 0.8% from two or more races. 0% of the population were Hispanic or Latino of any race.

== Parks and recreation ==
The Virginia Department of Wildlife Resources maintains a public access point to the James River in the CDP. The Glen Wilton public access point is one of twelve that make up the Upper James River Water Trail, a blueway along the James River.

== Government ==
The United States Postal Service operates the Glen Wilton Post Office within the CDP, however addresses use an Eagle Rock ZIP Code.

== Education ==
Glen Wilton is served by Botetourt County Public Schools. Public school students residing in Glen Wilton are zoned to attend Eagle Rock Elementary School, Central Academy Middle School, and James River High School.

Mountain Gateway Community College in nearby Clifton Forge is the closest higher education institution to the CDP.

== Infrastructure ==
The Western Virginia Water Authority operates the community's water and sanitary sewer systems.

=== Public safety ===
Law enforcement is provided by the Botetourt County Sheriff's Office.

Fire protection is provided by the Botetourt County Department of Fire and EMS, which operates a fire station within the CDP. Emergency medical services are provided by the Botetourt County Department of Fire and EMS from the nearby Eagle Rock fire station. Previously, the Glen Wilton Volunteer Fire Department and Rescue Squad provided fire protection and non-transport emergency medical services to the community. The agency dissolved in 2023 due to lack of membership.

== Transportation ==
=== Air ===
Ingalls Field, located near Hot Springs is the closest general aviation airport to the CDP. The Greenbrier Valley Airport and Roanoke-Blacksburg Regional Airport are the closest airports with commercial service to the CDP.

=== Road ===
- U.S. Route 220 is the closest highway to the CDP.

=== Rail ===
The CSX operated James River Subdivision runs through the CDP. The closest passenger rail service is located in Clifton Forge.
