= Newport, Page County, Virginia =

Newport, Virginia
- Unincorporated community
- Location within Virginia Location within the United States
- Coordinates: 38°34′43″N 78°35′47″W
- Country: United States
- State: Virginia
- County: Page
- Elevation: 814 ft (248 m)
- Time zone: UTC-5 (Eastern (EST))
  - Summer (DST): UTC-4 (EDT)
- Area code: 540
- GNIS feature ID: 1499797

Newport is an unincorporated community in Page County, Virginia, United States.

== Geography ==
Location of Newport within the Page County

Newport is located on the Shenandoah River and U.S. Route 340, 5 miles (8.0 km) west of Stanley.

Catherine Furnace was listed on the National Register of Historic Places in 1974.
