= Pennsylvania Furnace Mansion =

Historic house in Pennsylvania, United States

- U.S. National Register of Historic Places
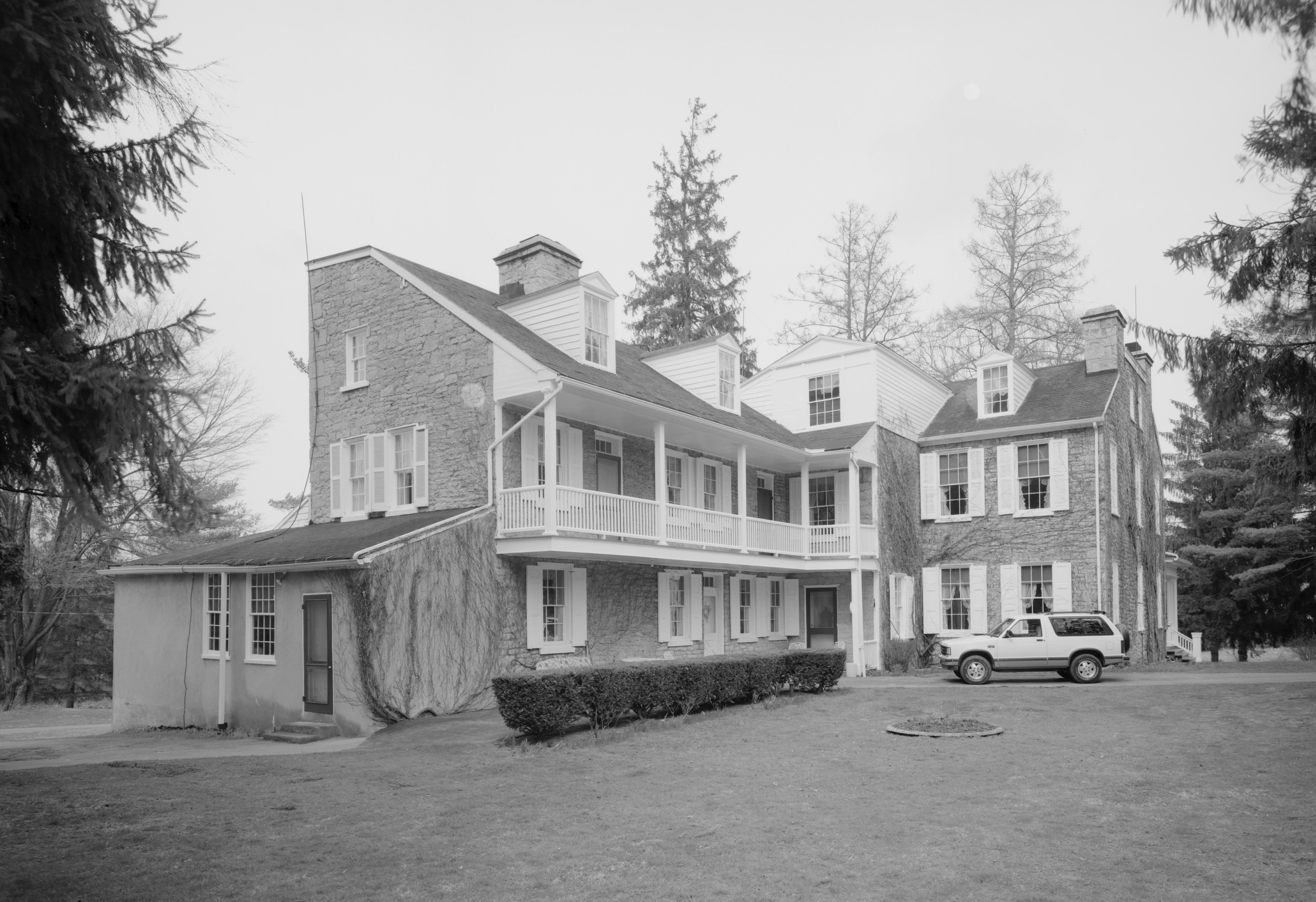
- Pennsylvania Furnace Mansion, April 1990

- Location within Pennsylvania Location within the United States
- Location: Off PA 45, S of Centre County line, Franklin Township, Pennsylvania
- Coordinates: 40°42′13″N 78°0′47″W
- Area: less than one acre
- Built: 1834
- Architectural style: Federal
- MPS: Industrial Resources of Huntingdon County, 1780--1939 MPS
- NRHP reference No.: 90000409
- Added to NRHP: March 20, 1990

The Pennsylvania Furnace Mansion, also known as the Lyon Mansion, is an historic home that is located in Franklin Township in Huntingdon County, Pennsylvania, United States.

It was listed on the National Register of Historic Places in 1990.

== History and architectural features ==
Built in 1834 as the ironmaster's mansion at Pennsylvania Furnace, this historic structure is a 2 1/2- to 4-story, L-shaped, limestone dwelling that was designed in the Federal style. The 3 1/2-story front facade features a center entrance framed by a transom and sidelights. Also located on the property is a contributing privy.
