= Central Railroad of Pennsylvania (1891–1918) =

Overview
- Headquarters: Bellefonte
- Locale: Pennsylvania
- Dates of operation: 1893–1918
- Successor: abandoned

Technical
- Track gauge: 4 ft 8 1/2 in (1,435 mm) standard gauge

The Central Railroad of Pennsylvania was a short railroad of 27.3 miles (43.9 km) built to connect Bellefonte, Pennsylvania with the Beech Creek Railroad (part of the New York Central) at Mill Hall, Pennsylvania. Sustained by shipments from the Bellefonte iron industry, the abandonment of the iron furnaces there led to its demise in 1918.

== Origins ==
The Central Pennsylvania Railroad was incorporated on May 11, 1889, to connect Unionville with Mill Hall, running by way of Bellefonte and the Nittany Valley. On December 11, 1890, the Central Pennsylvania Railroad Eastern Extension was incorporated, to leave the main line of the first company at Lamar and follow Fishing Creek, Sand Spring Run, and White Deer Creek to White Deer on the Susquehanna. This would provide a connection to the Philadelphia and Reading Railway, in addition to that with the NYC at Mill Hall.

The two companies were merged on September 11, 1891. However, the original investors, all of them from Watsontown, Pennsylvania, made little headway in construction. The president was Samuel H. Hicks, who was also general manager and superintendent of the Wilkes-Barre and Western Railway; this railroad terminated at Watsontown, across the Susquehanna from White Deer, and represented a possible connection with the eastern extension. The next year, Philadelphia and New York investors appeared among the directors, including Robert C. Bellville, secretary and treasurer of the Wilkes-Barre & Western, and Charles M. Clement, a prominent Sunbury lawyer and the new general counsel for the railroad. Still, the company lacked the resources to do more than grade 0.5 miles (0.80 km) of right-of-way at Mill Hall in the summer of 1892.

The railroad was saved by the entrance of J. Wesley Gephart, a prominent Bellefonte businessman and president of the Valentine Iron Company. At the time, the only railroad outlet for the iron company's Valentine Furnace was via the Pennsylvania Railroad, whose rates Gephart found excessive. After lengthy and fruitless negotiations, Gephart convinced the financial backers of Valentine Iron that the company could not remain profitable without an independent railroad outlet to break the PRR's monopoly on freight traffic. They chose the Central Railroad as their instrument. Although contemporary reports indicate that local subscriptions of $75,000 towards construction were received, the principal financing for the railroad was arranged by the sale of $600,000 in fifteen-year bonds of the railroad to Drexel and Company.

In the spring of 1893, the Drexel interests came onto the railroad's board of directors. Walter L. Ross, (Note: Walter was the elder brother of Charley Ross, the kidnap victim.) a banker affiliated with Drexel & Co., became the new president of the railroad, Hicks being demoted to vice-president, and William J. McHugh secretary and treasurer. Besides Ross and McHugh, William M. McLaughlin and Charles O. Kruger were added to the board; Hicks, Clement, and James I. Higbee, of Watsontown, remained of the previous directors.

Gephart was appointed general superintendent and placed in charge of construction in June 1893. The eastern extension to White Deer was never built, but from 1892 to 1893, the route from Mill Hall to Bellefonte was constructed, and the line opened on December 2, 1893.

With the eastern extension out of the picture, the Central could have held little interest for the Watsontown group. Hicks and Higbee left the board in 1894; their replacements were Charles W. Wilhelm, of Reading, who succeeded Hicks as vice-president, Edward L. Welsh, of Philadelphia, and Robert Valentine, a director of Valentine Iron. McLaughlin did not appear on the board at the time, but apparently returned to replace Kruger later that year.

== Route ==
The following stations existed along the line:

| Name | Mileage | Notes |
|---|---|---|
| Mill Hall | 0.0 | Connection with Beech Creek Railroad |
| Salona | 2.1 | station intact today |
| Cedar Springs | 2.6 | |
| Mackeyville | 4.7 | |
| Kriders Siding | 7.0 | |
| Clintondale | 9.1 | |
| Lamar | 10.1 | |
| Huston | 11.3 | |
| Nittany | 12.1 | |
| Snydertown | 13.2 | station intact today, moved to Centre Hall |
| Hublersburg | 15.2 | |
| Dunkles | 17.0 | |
| Hecla Park | 18.1 | opened 1894 by the railroad as an amusement park on the former Hecla Furnace grounds |
| Zion | 20.3 | |
| Nigh | 23.1 | |
| Bellefonte | 27.3 | just south of Lamb Street on the banks of Spring Creek |

After passing through Bald Eagle Mountain in the water gap of Fishing Creek, the railroad ran southwest along the open and relatively level Nittany Valley towards Bellefonte. The main line crossed and connected with the Nittany Valley Railroad about three miles east of Bellefonte. As it approached that town, it swung west-northwesterly and descended along a ravine through Armor Gap to Spring Creek, then turned south to follow the east bank of Spring Creek into the center of Bellefonte. The road's enginehouse was located north of Bellefonte near the creek; an interchange with the PRR, which had a spur to the American Lime and Stone Company's plants in Armor Gap, was also located in the vicinity.

== Operations ==
An early setback for the railroad occurred in 1895. The Centre Iron Company had made an exclusive contract with the PRR and its local subsidiaries for shipment of its products. Gephart held that the sheriff's sale of the Centre Iron properties to Valentine Iron had nullified the contract, and Valentine Iron began sending most of its traffic over the Central Railroad. While Gephart was initially successful, the PRR won on appeal, and Gephart was forced to step down as president of Valentine Iron, although he retained his post with the Central Railroad.

Despite the loss of traffic that followed this decision, the Central Railroad continued operations and improvement of its right-of-way. Besides the opening of Hecla Park, the railroad eliminated its last wooden trestle, over the present Pennsylvania Route 550 and adjacent ravine, and replaced it with a fill and iron bridge in November 1896. In 1899, Walter Ross resigned as president, to be replaced by Charles Clement.

Gephart, undaunted by the Valentine Iron fiasco, returned to the ironmaking scene in May 1899. Backed by "eastern capitalists", the Bellefonte Furnace Company was organized to put the Bellefonte Furnace at Coleville back into operation, supplied by iron mines at Mattern, Red Bank, and the former Carnegie ore pits at Scotia. The furnace lay a short distance to the west of Bellefonte, and was served by the Bellefonte Central Railroad. However, Gephart soon built an extension of the Central Railroad of Pennsylvania, which crossed Spring Creek on a trestle to reach the furnace and an interchange with the BFC, and began supplying the furnace with limestone from a quarry at Salona.

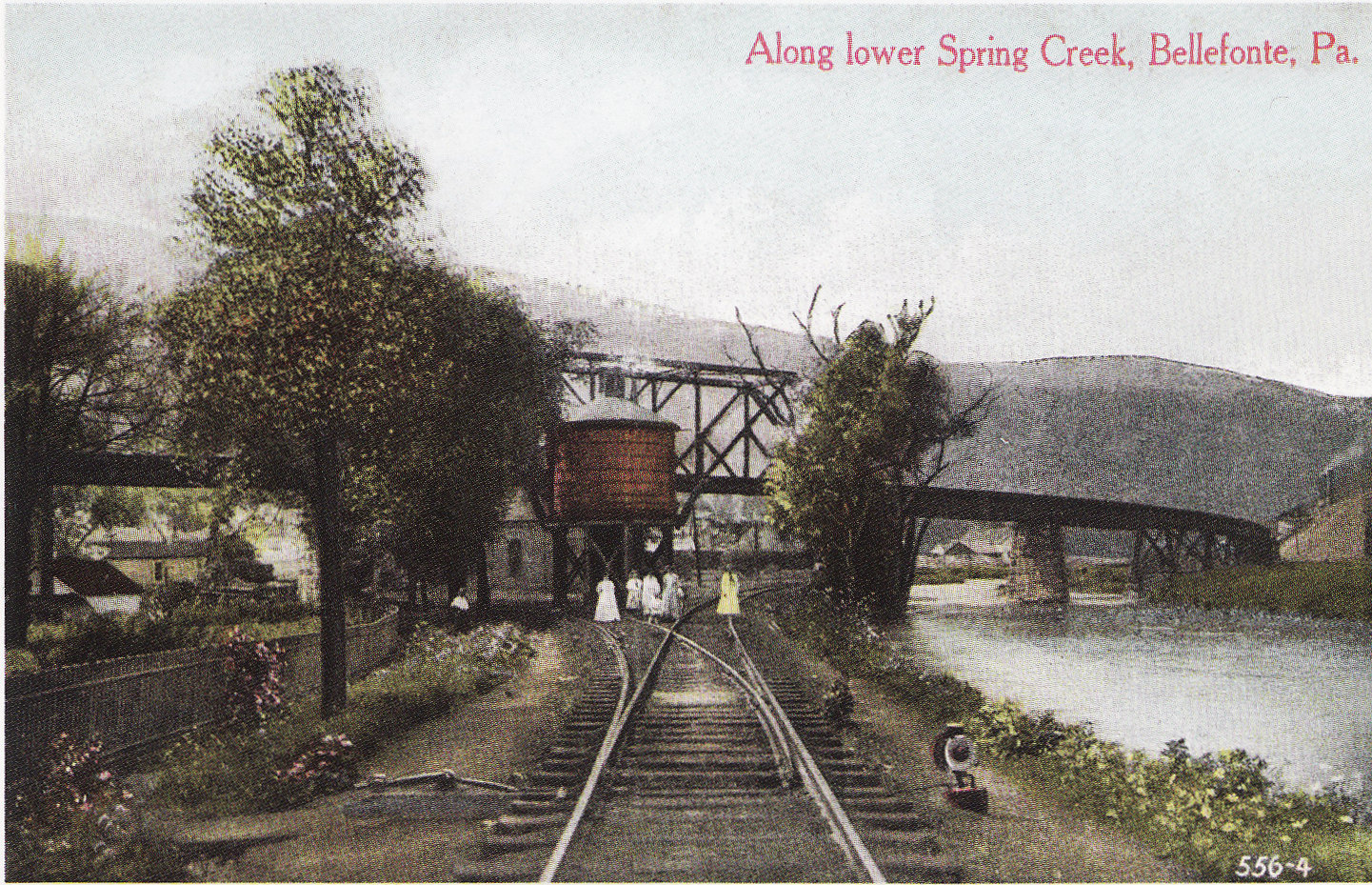
The Central Railroad's trestle into Bellefonte Furnace

Gephart was also involved with the Bellefonte and Clearfield Railroad, incorporated on December 30, 1895, to build from Milesburg to Clearfield. It seems to have been intended to extend the Central RR of PA the short distance along Spring Creek through Bald Eagle Ridge to Milesburg to connect with this new line, which would have provided a PRR-independent route to the coal mines and coke ovens of the Clearfield area. However, no construction was ever begun on the route.

Some additional business for the railroad was provided by local lumber operations. The McNitt brothers operated a 3 ft (914 mm) gauge logging railroad from a sawmill at Hecla Park south to their timberlands from about 1899 to 1902. In the latter year, they entered a partnership with E. M. Huyett, closed the Hecla Park operation, and moved to Snydertown. A new 3 ft (914 mm) gauge logging railroad was built northwest from Snydertown to Sand Ridge, where branches ran northeast and southwest along the ridge. This railroad operated from 1903 to 1909.

Between 1902 and 1903, Charles Wilhelm was succeeded by Edward Welsh as vice-president. In 1903, all the Bellefonte Furnace traffic from or to the PRR was diverted from the Bellefonte Central to the Central Railroad of Pennsylvania. That year, the company's enginehouse burned down, and two engines were badly damaged. It was rebuilt in 1904.

As the 20th Century opened, iron ore deposits of the Mesabi Range largely superseded local ore deposits, and local furnaces like those in Bellefonte became obsolete and unable to compete against large steel plants. The prospects for the Bellefonte furnaces were further dimmed by the sudden death of Wes Gephart in 1905. He was replaced as general superintendent by his son, Wallace H. Gephart. Clement resigned the presidency in 1909; he was succeeded by Wallace Gephart, and the post of general superintendent was abolished.

When Bellefonte Furnace shut down in 1910, followed by Nittany Furnace in 1911, the Central Railroad lost most of its traffic. The last passenger train ran on the line on November 28, 1918, and the tracks were removed in 1919 from Bellefonte to Salona. The line from Mill Hall to Salona was operated by the NYC as a siding until the 1950s to serve the limestone quarry there. The enginehouse and the line from there to the PRR interchange appear to have been re-used by American Lime and Stone.
