= Callie Furnace =

Historic iron furnace in Virginia, US

- U.S. National Register of Historic Places
- Virginia Landmarks Register
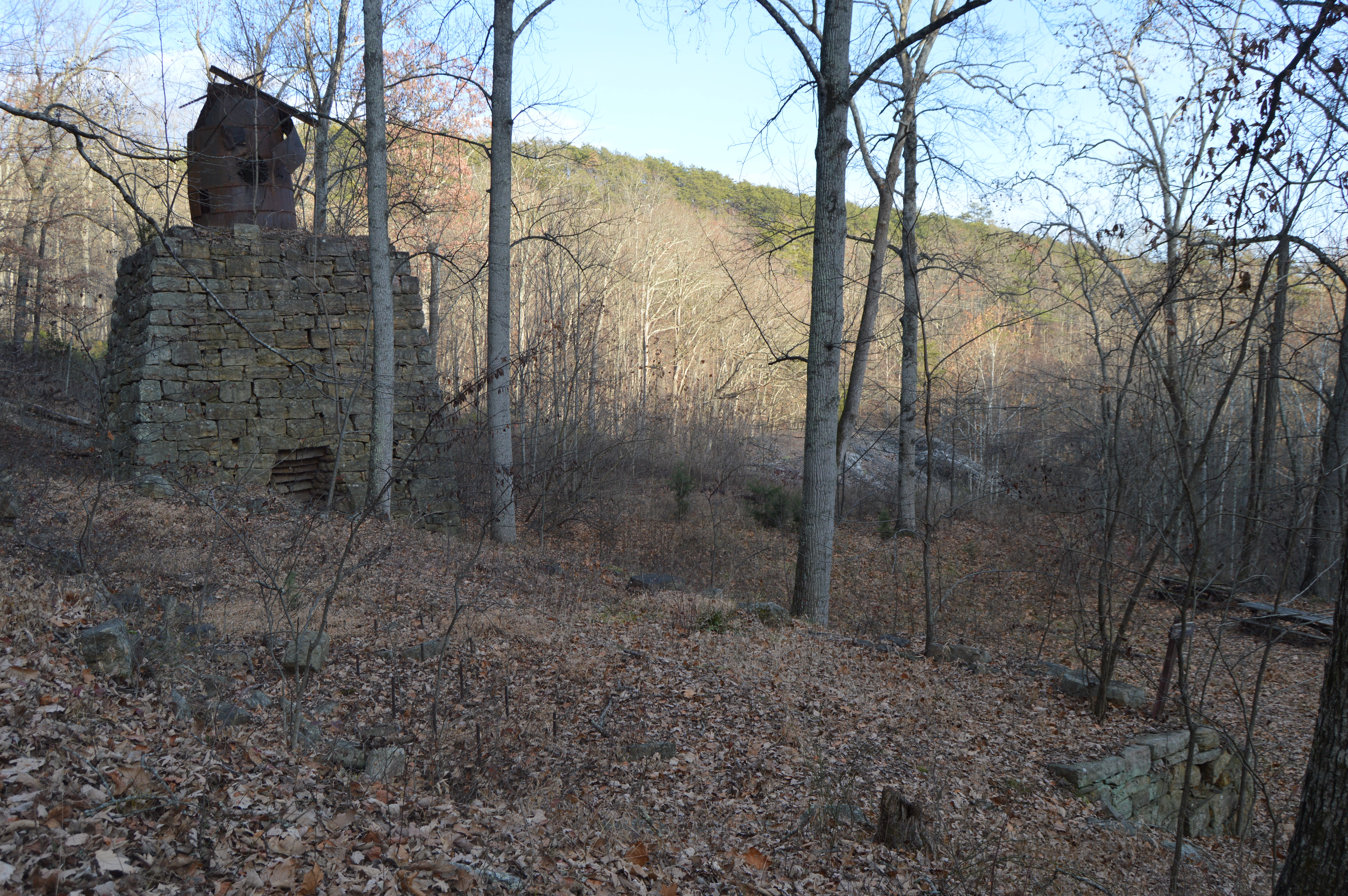
- Overview of the site

- Location within Virginia Location within the United States
- Location: George Washington National Forest, 1.5 miles (2.4 km) north of Glen Wilton, Virginia
- Coordinates: 37°46′37.5″N 79°49′27″W
- Area: 2 acres (0.81 ha)
- Built: 1873-1874, 1883
- NRHP reference No.: 74002108
- VLR No.: 011-0065

Significant dates
- Added to NRHP: January 21, 1974
- Designated VLR: July 17, 1973

Callie Furnace is a historic iron furnace located near Glen Wilton, Botetourt County, Virginia. It was built as a hot-blast charcoal furnace around 1873–1874, and subsequently enlarged and converted into a coke furnace. In 1883, the stack was raised an additional five feet (1.5 m), and a tuyere was added. Callie Furnace went out of blast in 1884.

It was listed on the National Register of Historic Places in 1974.
