= Logan Branch =

Stream in the American state of Missouri

Logan Branch is a stream in Franklin and Gasconade County in the U.S. state of Missouri. It is a tributary of the Bourbeuse River.

The stream headwaters arise in southeast Gasconade County at 38°13′11″N 91°23′12″W and it flows generally to the northeast into Franklin County to its confluence with the Bourbeuse at 38°15′48″N 91°20′57″W.

Logan Branch has the name of a pioneer citizen.

== See also ==
- List of rivers of Missouri
