= Nittany Valley Railroad =

Overview
- Headquarters: Bellefonte
- Locale: Centre County, Pennsylvania
- Dates of operation: 1888–1914
- Successor: abandoned

Technical
- Track gauge: 4 ft 8 1/2 in (1,435 mm) standard gauge

The Nittany Valley Railroad was a Pennsylvania shortline built to haul iron ore to blast furnaces near Bellefonte.

The company was incorporated on March 15, 1887. It was controlled by B.K. Jamison, president of the Centre Iron Company. The railroad was constructed from a connection with the Bellefonte, Nittany and Lemont Railroad (a Pennsylvania Railroad subsidiary) in the valley of Logan Branch south of Bellefonte, 4.8 miles (7.7 km) to the ore banks at Taylors. The Nittany Furnace of the Centre Iron Company, which consumed the ore, was located in the vicinity of the interchange. The Centre Iron Company was foreclosed and reorganized as the Valentine Iron Company in 1890, which continued to operate the railroad.

In 1893, the Central Railroad of Pennsylvania built across its tracks on the east side of Bellefonte, near the Nigh Bank iron mines, and made a connection there. The Central Railroad and the Nittany Valley were both under the control of J. Wesley Gephart, president of Valentine Iron, who began routing traffic from Nittany Furnace over the Nittany Valley and then via the Central Railroad to Mill Hall. However, the Centre Iron Company, which had formerly owned the furnace, had made an exclusive contract to ship its products over the Bellefonte, Nittany & Lemont (by that time part of the Bald Eagle Valley Railroad). A court initially found in favor of the Nittany Valley, but the judgement was reversed on appeal in 1895 and the contract was held to be binding upon Valentine Iron. Gephart stepped down from the presidency of the iron company and the superintendency of the Nittany Valley in the wake of the affair. He was replaced as superintendent of the railroad by Mortimer O'Donoghue.

After the exhaustion of the ore bank, the railroad was used to haul limestone. However, the exhaustion of local ore deposits and the obsolete nature of the local iron furnaces made them increasingly vulnerable. Nittany Furnace shut down in 1911 and was scrapped in 1913. With the loss of its major customer, the Nittany Valley was shut down in 1914, and scrapped in the mid-1920s.
