= Catherine Furnace =

- U.S. National Register of Historic Places
- Virginia Landmarks Register
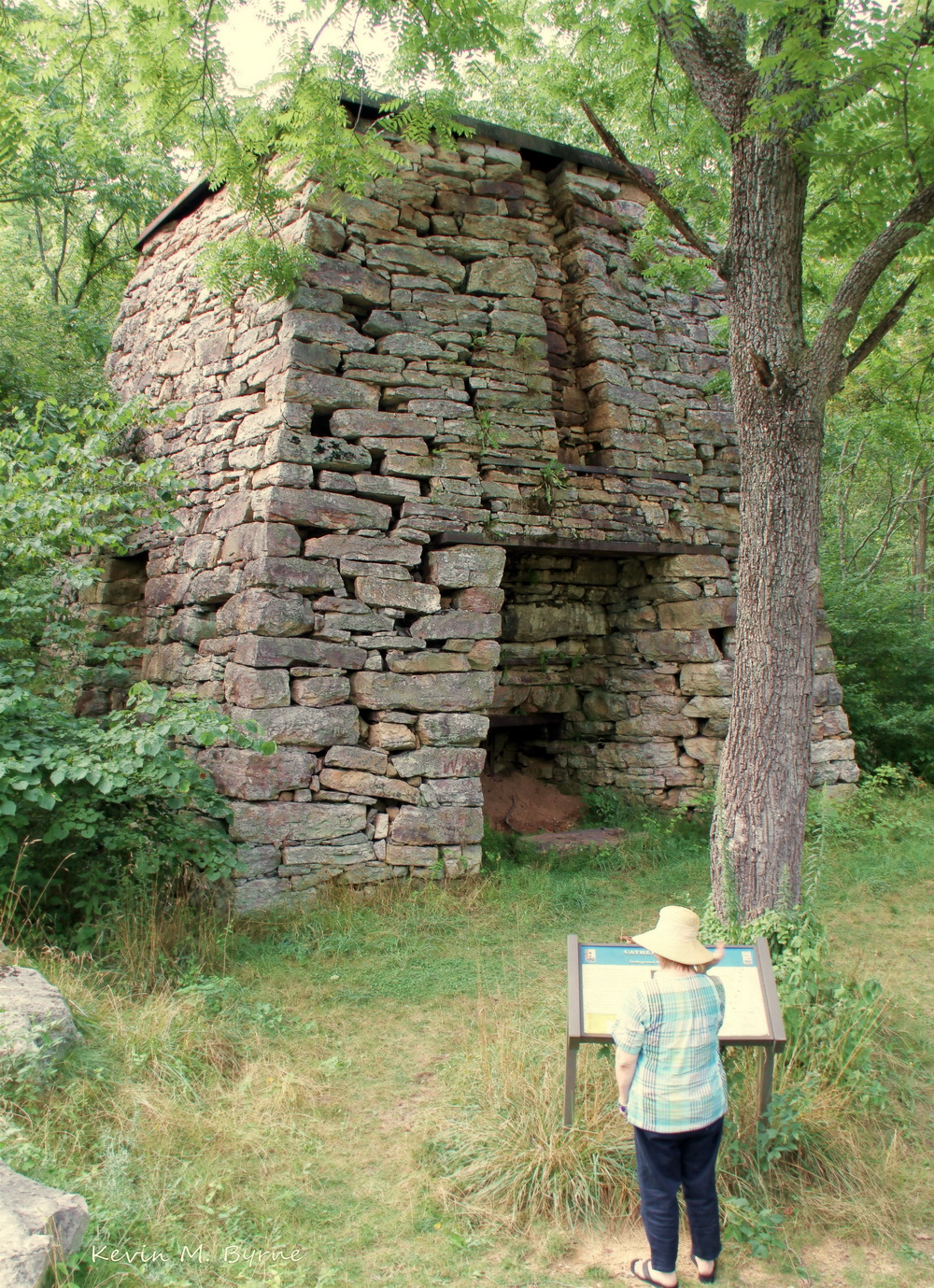

- Location within Virginia Location within the United States
- Location: 2 mi. W of Newport in George Washington National Forest, near Newport, Virginia
- Coordinates: 38°33′28″N 78°38′9″W
- Area: 9 acres (3.6 ha)
- NRHP reference No.: 74002141
- VLR No.: 069-0130

Significant dates
- Added to NRHP: January 21, 1974
- Designated VLR: July 17, 1973

Catherine Furnace is a historic iron furnace in the George Washington National Forest near Newport, Page County, Virginia. It was built in 1836 and is a pyramidal-shaped furnace measuring 32 feet high. It was instrumental in producing high-quality pig iron used in the Mexican War and American Civil War. The furnace was abandoned in 1885.

It was listed on the National Register of Historic Places in 1974.
