= Franklin Township, Huntingdon County, Pennsylvania =

Township in Pennsylvania, US

Coordinates: 40°40′00″N 77°58′59″W

- Township
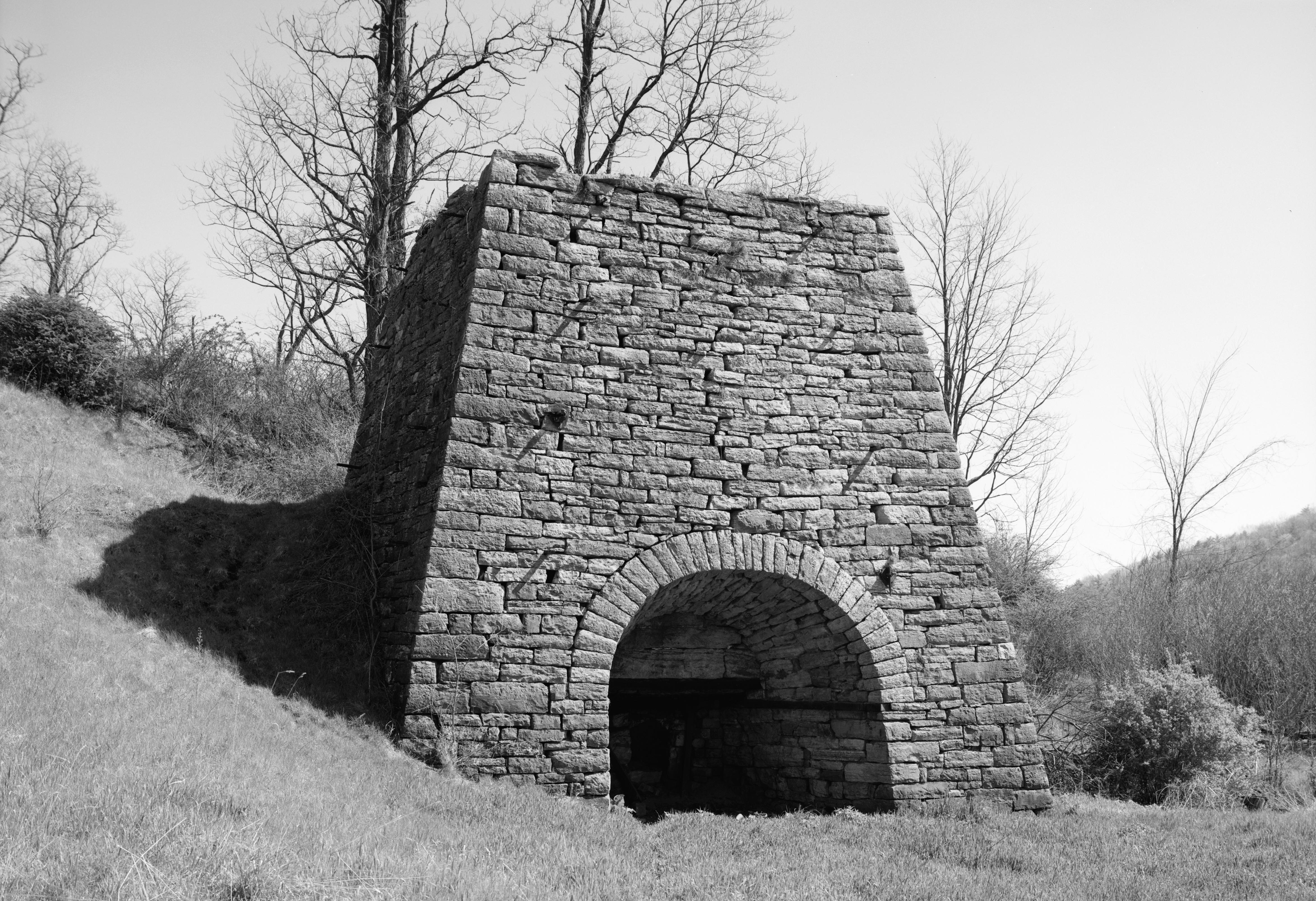
- Huntingdon Furnace, a historic landmark in the township

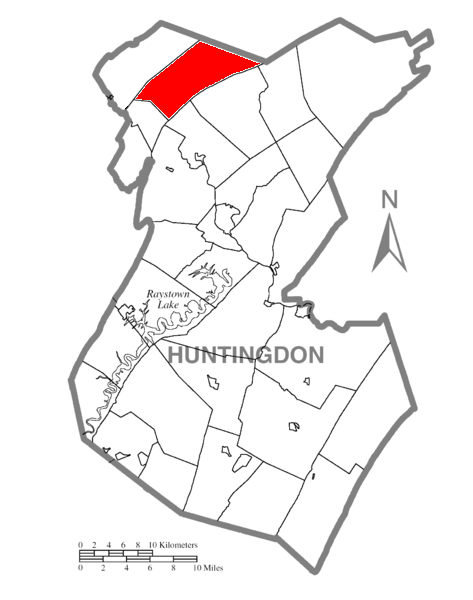
- Map of Huntingdon County, Pennsylvania Highlighting Franklin Township

- Map of Huntingdon County, Pennsylvania
- Country: United States
- State: Pennsylvania
- County: Huntingdon

Area
  - Total: 31.48 sq mi (81.52 km^{2})
  - Land: 31.47 sq mi (81.50 km^{2})
  - Water: 0.0039 sq mi (0.01 km^{2})

Population (2020)
  - Total: 492 ▲
  - Estimate (2022): 484
  - Density: 14.9/sq mi (5.75/km^{2})
- Time zone: UTC-5 (Eastern (EST))
  - Summer (DST): UTC-4 (EDT)
- FIPS code: 42-061-27416

Franklin Township is a township in Huntingdon County, Pennsylvania, United States. The population was 492 at the 2020 census.

== General information ==
- ZIP Code: 16865, 16683
- Area Code: 814
- Local Phone Exchange: 632
- School District: Tyrone Area School District

== History ==
The Colerain Forges Mansion, Pennsylvania Furnace Mansion, and Spruce Creek Rod and Gun Club are listed on the National Register of Historic Places.

== Geography ==
According to the United States Census Bureau, the township has a total area of 31.7 square miles (82 km^{2}), of which 31.7 square miles (82 km^{2}) is land and 0.03% is water.

== Demographics ==
Historical population
Census	Pop.	Note	%±
2000	447		—
2010	466		4.3%
2020	492		5.6%
2022 (est.)	484		−1.6%
U.S. Decennial Census

As of the census of 2000, there were 447 people, 184 households, and 133 families residing in the township. The population density was 14.1 people per square mile (5.4/km^{2}). There were 238 housing units at an average density of 7.5/sq mi (2.9/km^{2}). The racial makeup of the township was 98.66% White, 1.12% from other races, and 0.22% from two or more races. Hispanic or Latino of any race were 1.79% of the population.

There were 184 households, out of which 26.6% had children under the age of 18 living with them, 65.2% were married couples living together, 4.3% had a female householder with no husband present, and 27.7% were non-families. 22.8% of all households were made up of individuals, and 10.3% had someone living alone who was 65 years of age or older. The average household size was 2.43 and the average family size was 2.87.

In the township the population was spread out, with 20.1% under the age of 18, 8.7% from 18 to 24, 30.2% from 25 to 44, 25.1% from 45 to 64, and 15.9% who were 65 years of age or older. The median age was 39 years. For every 100 females, there were 100.4 males. For every 100 females age 18 and over, there were 102.8 males.

The median income for a household in the township was $38,864, and the median income for a family was $43,250. Males had a median income of $31,979 versus $23,250 for females. The per capita income for the township was $19,295. About 2.3% of families and 6.5% of the population were below the poverty line, including 3.3% of those under age 18 and 2.9% of those age 65 or over.
