= Woodycrest, Pennsylvania =

Unincorporated community in Pennsylvania, US

- Unincorporated community
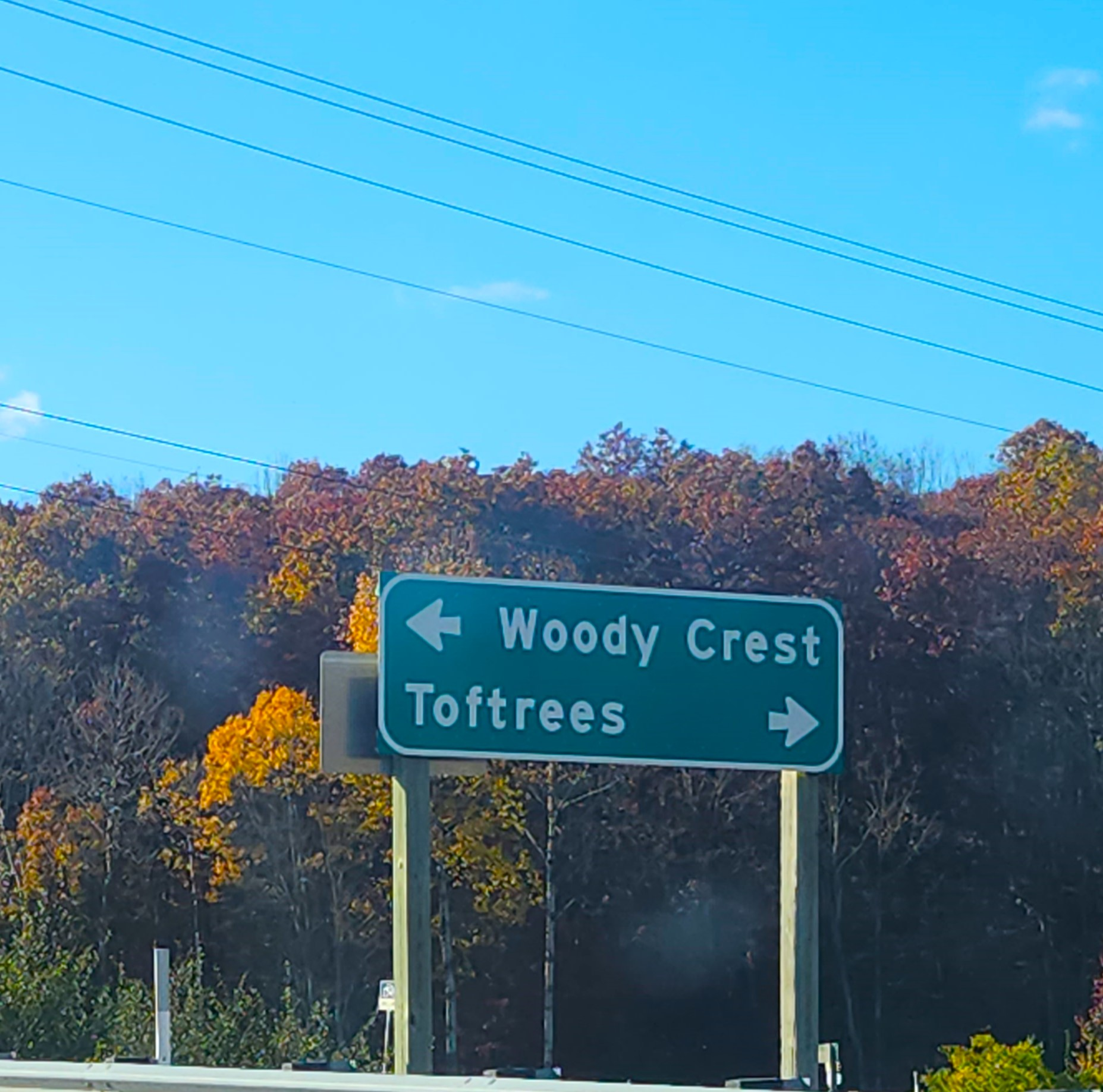
- Interstate 99 exist 71 Woody Crest and Toftrees

- Location within the U.S. state of Pennsylvania Woody Crest (the United States)
- Coordinates: 40°48′47.22″N 77°54′9.01″W
- Country: United States
- State: Pennsylvania
- County: Centre
- Township: Patton
- Time zone: UTC-5 (Eastern (EST))
  - Summer (DST): UTC-4 (EDT)
- ZIP code: 16803
- GNIS feature ID: 1992800

Woodycrest (also Woody Crest) is a neighborhood and an unincorporated community in Patton Township, Centre County, Pennsylvania, United States. It is part of Happy Valley and the larger Nittany Valley. Woodycrest borders Park Forest to the south of North Atherton Street, Toftrees to the north, and Oakwood to the east.

The neighborhood is home to the Colonnade at State College shopping mall, Woodycrest Park, and Woodycrest United Methodist Church, which partially collapsed in a fire.

== History ==
Woodycrest began as an unplanned community out of W.A. Strouse's 65-acre farm in 1927. Strouse sold plots of land for $20 to $50 each. He even sold his first plot for 30 chickens. He also donated land for a park and a church which become the Woodycrest United Methodist Church. At the time the main road from Woodycrest to State College was a dirt road that meandered from College Heights to Waddle prior to the construction of North Atherton Street and Skytop Mountain Road from Downtown State College to Martha's Furnace in 1932. In the same year, Lytle's addition, an affordable working class community, was annexed by Borough of State College from College Township. As prices in Lytle's addition rose, residents moved into Woodycrest. The neighborhood is still regarded as an enclave of affordable housing.

== Transportation ==
=== Buses ===
Woodycrest is served by the Atherton Street Connector, Vairo, and Colonade/Toftrees routes operated by CATA

=== Streets ===
Woodycrest is off of exit 71 Woodycrest/Toftrees on Interstate 99.

U.S. 322 Bus also known as Atherton Street passes along Woodycrest.
