= Buffalo Run (Spring Creek tributary) =

Physical characteristics
- Source
  - location: Patton Township, Pennsylvania
- Mouth
  - location: Spring Creek in Bellefonte, Pennsylvania
  - coordinates: 40°55′01″N 77°47′10″W

Basin features
- Progression: Spring Creek; Bald Eagle Creek; West Branch Susquehanna River; Susquehanna River; Chesapeake Bay
- River system: Susquehanna River system

Buffalo Run is a creek in Centre County, Pennsylvania in the United States.

It flows from Skytop to Bellefonte through the communities of Waddle, Fillmore, Continental Courts, Hunters Park, Chemical, and Coleville.

The Bellefonte Central Railroad's main line followed Buffalo Run.
