= Graysdale, Pennsylvania =

Unincorporated community in Patton Township, Centre County, Pennsylvania

Grays Woods, Pennsylvania
- Unincorporated community
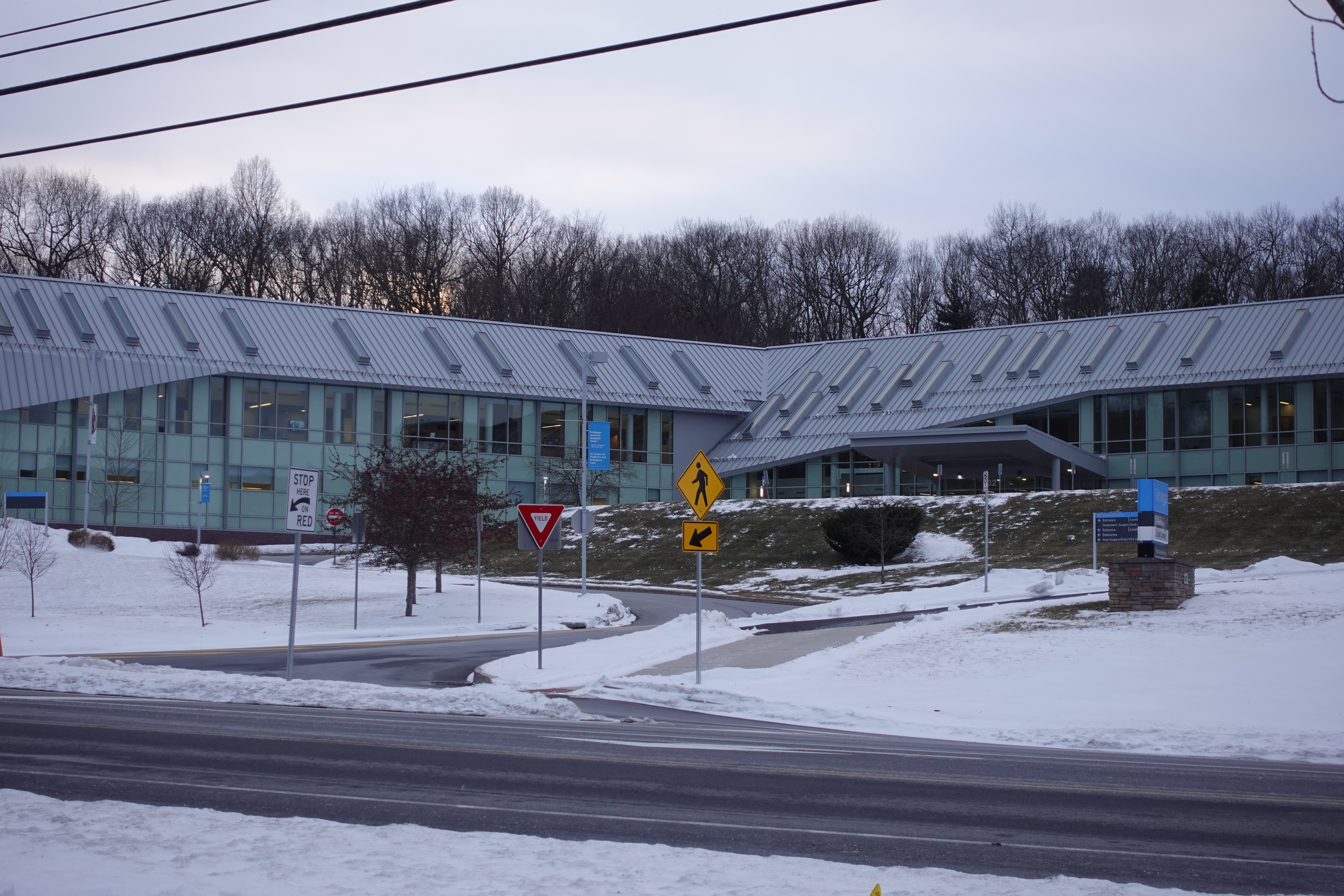
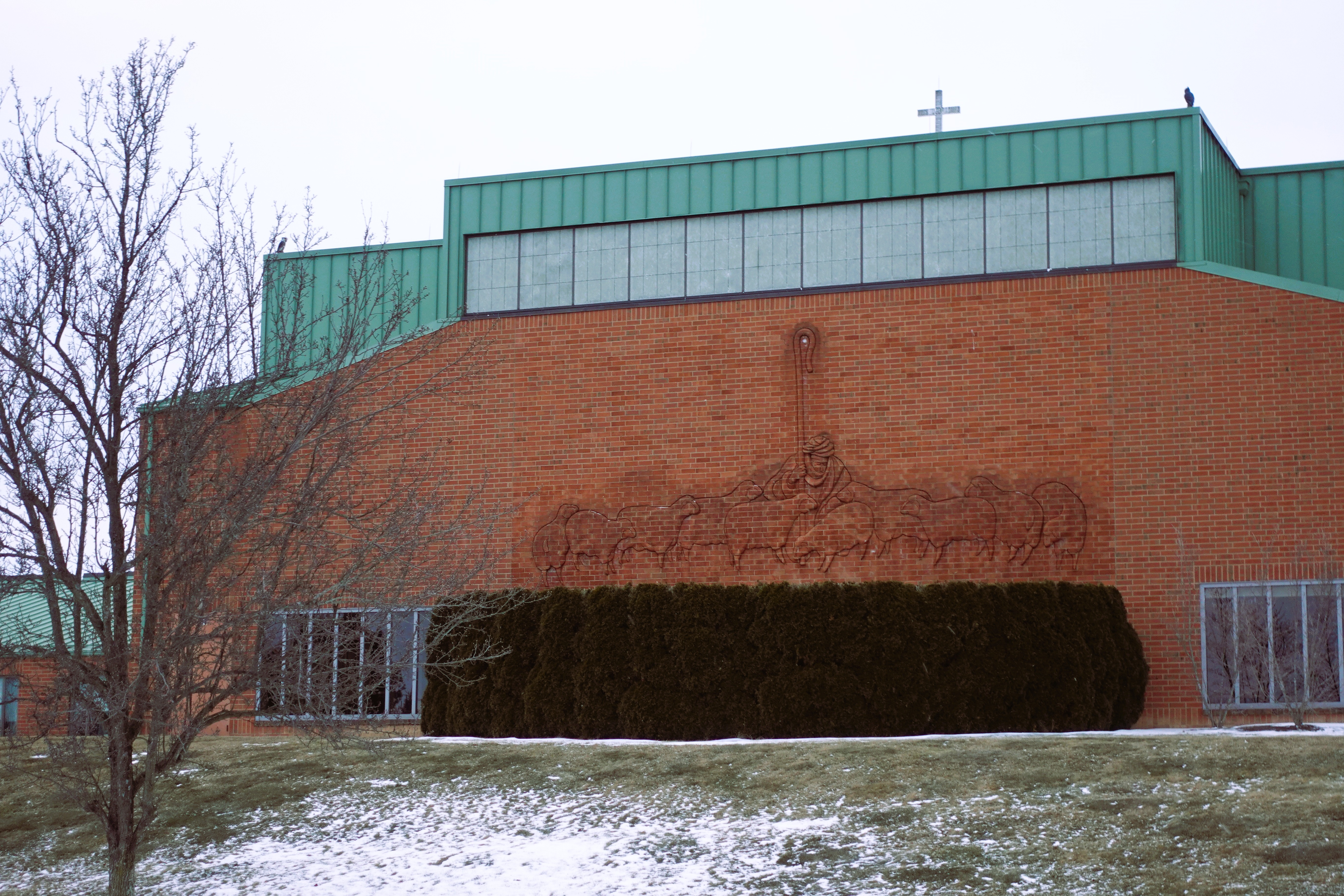
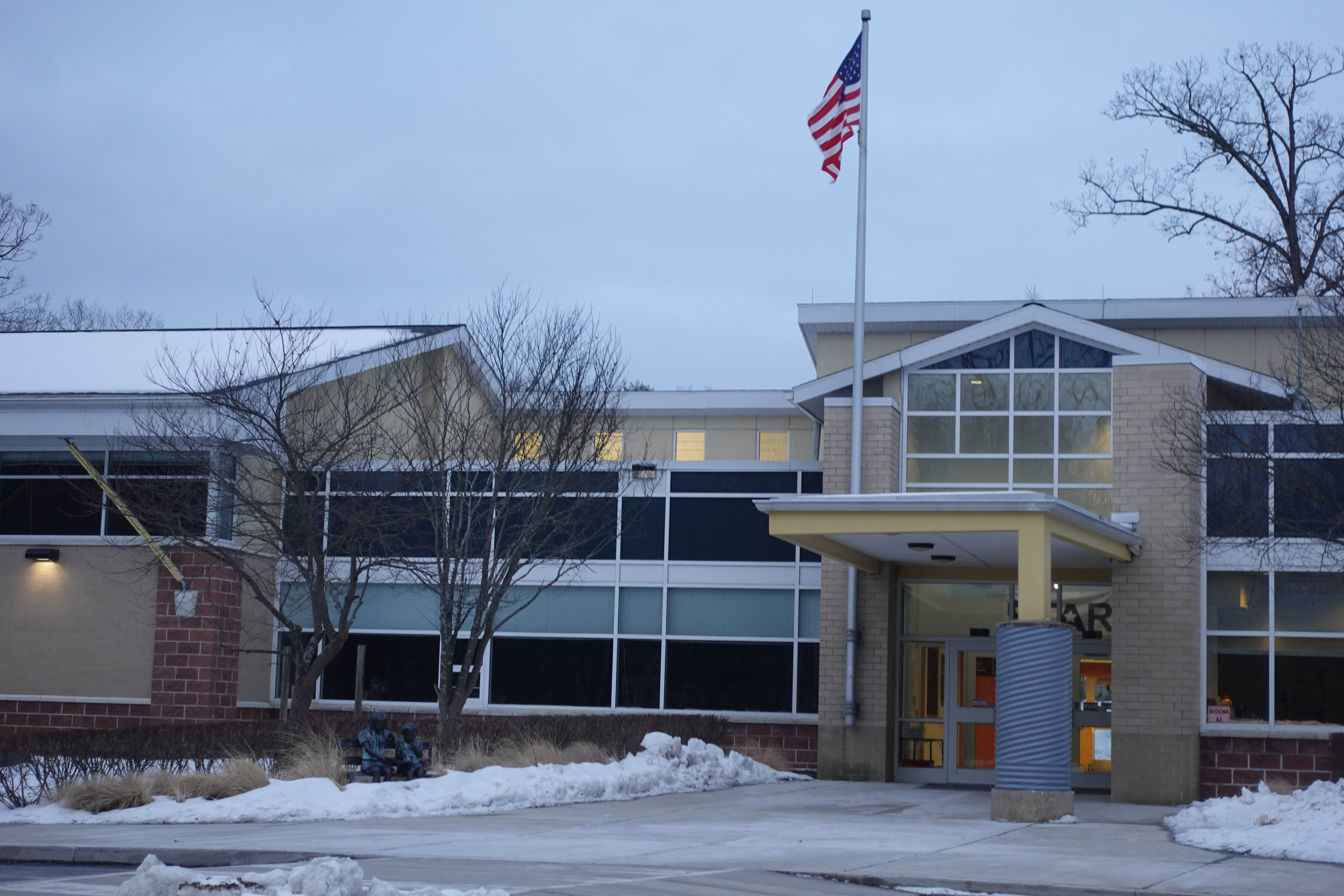
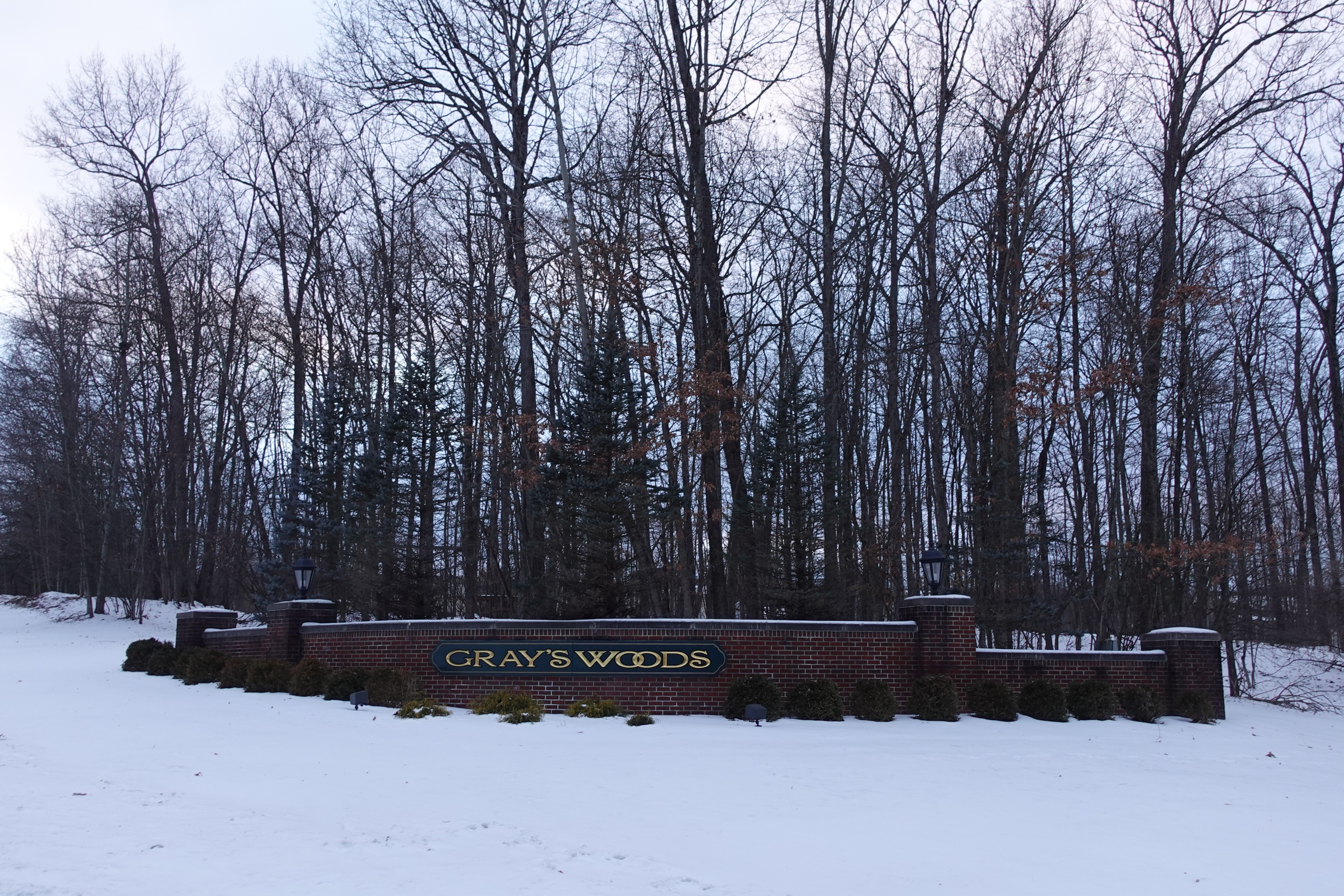
- Geisinger Healthplex Church of the Good Shepherd Grays Woods Elementary Grays Woods Sign

- Location within the U.S. state of Pennsylvania Grays Woods (the United States)
- Coordinates: 40°48′26″N 77°56′54.9″W
- Country: United States
- State: Pennsylvania
- County: Centre
- Township: Patton
- Elevation: 1,401 ft (427 m)
- Time zone: UTC-5 (Eastern (EST))
  - Summer (DST): UTC-4 (EDT)
- ZIP code: 16870

Grays Woods (also Graysdale) is a neighborhood and unincorporated community in Patton Township, Centre County, Pennsylvania, United States. It is part of Happy Valley and the larger Nittany Valley.

== History ==
The Red Bank Branch of the Bellefonte Central Railroad, from Mattern Junction to Red Bank, was built through the town circa 1887. The branch was built to carry iron ore, the mining of which supported Graysdale and other local towns. It was cut back to end in Graysdale in 1894 due to the shutdown of Bellefonte Furnace, the principal consumer of the local ore; however, the furnace re-opened under new management in the 1890s, and was back to near-full capacity by 1900.

Ore mining resumed, the line from Graysdale to Mattern Bank was re-laid in 1900, and a new branch was built from Graysdale to Scotia; however, the furnace was unable to compete with more modern iron and steel mills, and shut down again, permanently in 1910.

The McNitt-Huyett Lumber Company laid a third rail on the line from Mattern Junction to Scotia around this time, to operate its 36-inch (91.44 cm) logging trains, but both the lumber company and the Bellefonte Central removed their tracks through Graysdale in 1915.

With the cessation of logging and iron mining, the area largely became vacant. The largest employer in the neighborhood is Geisinger Healthplex State College (formerly Geisinger Healthplex Gray's Woods), with 563 employees.

== Geography ==
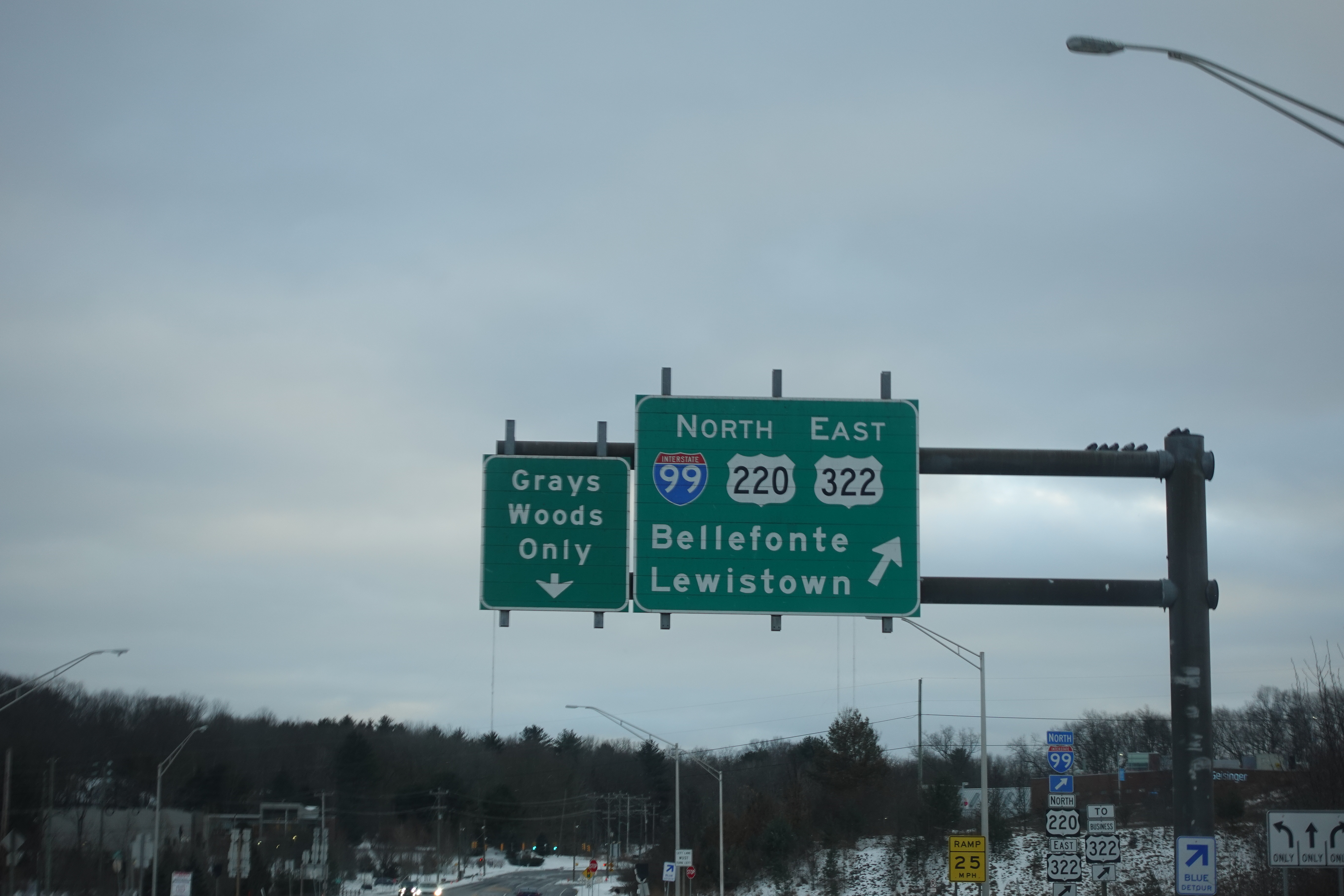
Grays Woods Sign off of I-99, U.S. Route 322, and 220

Grays Woods is entirely in Patton Township. It is northwest of Park Forest, north of Scotia, east of Stormstown, south of Skytop, and southwest of Waddle.

In 2017 Patton Township acquired 149-acre of pitch pine-scrub oak forest in the Scotia Barrens for the Gray's Woods Preserve.

Grays Woods is off of exit 68 Grays Woods/Waddle on Interstate 99.

The neighborhood is served by the State College Area School District, which operates Gray's Woods Elementary School in the area.
