= Colonnade at State College =

- Location: Patton Township, Pennsylvania, U.S.
- Coordinates: 40.79444°N 77.86911°W
- Address: Colonnade Boulevard at North Atherton Street
- Opened: 2000
- Manager: Allied Retail Properties
- Owner: Allied Retail Properties
- Num. of stores: 15+
- Num. of anchor tenants: 3
- Floor area: 374,710 square feet (34,812 m^{2})
- Floors: 1
- Parking: Lighted lot
- Public transit: CATA bus: HM, N, V, VN

Colonnade at State College is an open-air shopping center located just off North Atherton Street (U.S. Route 322 Business) in Patton Township, Pennsylvania. Opened in 2000, the center is currently home to three anchors, Kohl's, Target, and Wegmans, and other retailers. Dining options include Applebee's, Starbucks, Taco Bell, and Wegmans Market Cafe.

== History ==
Construction began on the 70-acre Colonnade at State College shopping center in the fall of 1999. Target, Wegmans, Dick's Sporting Goods, Michaels, Circuit City, and a 14-screen Carmike Cinemas were all set to be among the earliest tenants however, Carmike would be forced to back out due to its Chapter 11 bankruptcy filing in the summer of 2000 (they eventually came out of bankruptcy two years later). All of the other stores proceeded to open as scheduled although Circuit City would close in 2009 due to the bankruptcy of that store chain. Kohl's was added in 2008 and HomeGoods eventually replaced Circuit City. An additional 68,000 square feet of retail space has been approved and is pending construction. Once completed, the Colonnade’s total retail area would be over 442,000 square feet.

Adjoining the Colonnade on the northeast side is Patton Town Center which currently includes a Cracker Barrel restaurant, a 6,000 sq. ft. Sheetz convenience store, and Penn Highlands State College. There are plans to add another restaurant and a shopping center.

== Anchors ==
- Kohl's – 88,925 square feet (8,261 m^{2})
- Target – 126,917 square feet (11,791 m^{2})
- Wegmans – 101,670 square feet (9,445 m^{2})
