= Huston Township, Pennsylvania =

Huston Township is the name of some places in the U.S. state of Pennsylvania:

- Huston Township, Blair County, Pennsylvania
- Huston Township, Centre County, Pennsylvania
- Huston Township, Clearfield County, Pennsylvania
