= Alpha Fire Company =

Fire company

Operational area
- Country: United States
- State: Pennsylvania
- County: Centre County

Agency overview
- Established: 1899
- Annual calls: 1400
- Employees: 100
- Staffing: All Volunteer
- Motto: Do More. Be More. Volunteer.

Facilities and equipment
- Stations: Main Station, 400 West Beaver Ave; College Township Station; Patton Township Station
- Engines: Engine 5-1, Engine 5-2, Engine 5-3, Engine 5-4; Tanker 5-1, Tanker 5-2
- Trucks: Truck 5-1, Truck 5-2, Quint 5
- Rescues: Rescue 5

Website
- Alpha Fire Company

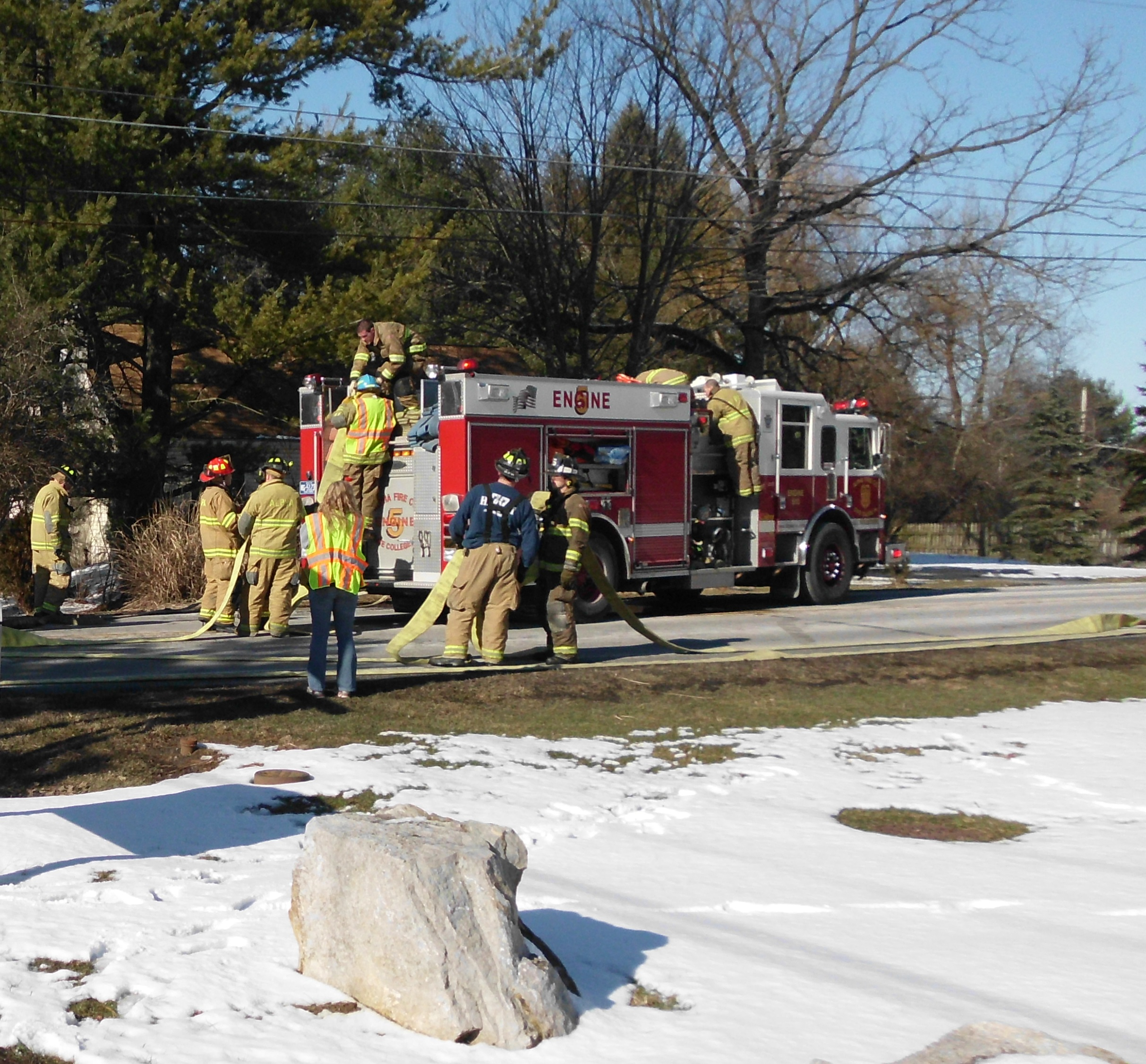
Alpha Fire Company at a house fire

The Alpha Fire Company provides fire and rescue services for the Borough of State College, College Township, Ferguson Township, Patton Township, and Pennsylvania State University.

== Background ==
The company was formed in 1899 as the Union Fire Company and changed its name to Alpha Fire Company in 1900.

== Mission and community service ==
The mission statement of Alpha Fire is: "To protect the lives and property of the members of the Borough of State College and surrounding communities." Volunteers who serve with the company are each required to undergo various training modules, the first of which amounts to approximately 80 hours over the members' first 12 weeks with the company. All members are required to obtain their national Firefighter I Certification within 24 months of joining.

In addition to protecting property and lives, members of the fire department also engage in activities that foster positive working relations between the department and members of the community. In the past, such activities have included transporting Santa Claus through the borough during State College's annual Christmas Eve celebration.

== Apparatus ==
Alpha Fire Company operates a fleet of 27 vehicles.

- Command 5 - 2019 Chevrolet Tahoe (Incident command post rotated among the line officers)
- Car 5 - 2022 Ford Interceptor (Fire Chief's car, additional command post)
- Car 55 - 2022 Ford Interceptor (Fire Director's car, additional command post)
- Traffic 5-1 - 2021 Ford F-350 Fire Police Traffic Unit
- Traffic 5-2 - 2021 Ford F-350 Fire Police Traffic Unit
- Traffic 5-3 - 1996 KME Renegade with Scorpion II Attenuator Fire Police Blocking Unit
- Special Unit 5 - Modified 2005 Chevrolet Silverado Crew Cab
- Utility 5-1 - 2005 Chevrolet 2500
- Utility 5-2 - 2012 Chevrolet 2500
- Utility 5-3 - 2013 Chevrolet Tahoe
- Utility 5-4 - 2013 Ford Interceptor
- Utility 5-5 - 2023 Ford F-350
- Fire Marshal 55 - 2013 Ford Interceptor
- UTV 5 - 2011 Kubota RTV
- Drop-Deck 5 - 2019 JLG Utility Trailer
- Service 55 - 2018 Ford F-350 with a Reading Body
- Heavy Lift 5 - 1988 Nissan N6000 Fork Lift
- Hazmat 55 - 1997 Seagrave Walk-In HazMat Unit

=== Engine Companies ===
- Engine 5-1 - 2024 Pierce Enforcer
- Engine 5-2 - 2002 Pierce Dash Custom Engine
- Engine 5-3 - 2002 Pierce Dash Custom Engine
- Engine 5-4 - 2017 Pierce Velocity PUC
- Tanker 5-1 - 2013 Pierce/Kenworth Custom Tanker
- Tanker 5-2 - 2021 Pierce/Kenworth Custom Tanker

=== Truck Companies ===
- Truck 5-1 - 2016 95 Foot Pierce Velocity ladder Truck
- Truck 5-2 - 2009 75 Foot Pierce Aerial Scope tower ladder Truck
- Quint 5 - 2010 75 Foot Aerial PUC Quint on a Pierce Arrow XT Chassis.

=== Rescue Company ===
- Rescue 5 - 2000 Saulsbury Cougar Series Rescue on a Spartan Gladiator Long four-door Chassis

== Stations ==
Alpha Fire operates out of three stations:

=== Main Station ===
The Main Station is in Downtown State College at 400 West Beaver Avenue opened in 1974. The Main Station has a Meeting Room, Maintenance Shop, Lounge, Watch Office, Kitchen, Administration Office, Gym, and Bunk room. The bunk room houses 6 live-ins and has room for 17 total bunks. The station houses 5 pieces of apparatus, Engine 5-1, Engine 5-3, Truck 5-1, Rescue 5, and Tanker 5-1. Traffic Units 5-1 and 5-2, Utility 5-2, Utility 5-4, Service 55, Special Unit 5, and Command 5 are also housed here.

=== College Township Station ===
The College Township station is a sub-station housed in the basement of the College Township Building at 1481 East College Avenue. This station has a watchroom, office, lounge, bunkroom, live-in rooms for 4 live-ins, and a kitchen. Engine 5-2, Quint 5, and Utility 5-1, are housed here.

=== Patton Township Station ===
The Patton Township Sub-Station facility at 2598 Green Tech Drive opened in 2001. It has rooms for four live-in members and a bunkroom for 6 additional firefighters. The station houses Truck 5-2, Engine 5-4, Tanker 5-2, Traffic 5-3, Utility 5-3, and Utility 5-5.

== See also ==
- Centre County, Pennsylvania
- Borough of State College
- College Township
- Ferguson Township
- Patton Township
- Pennsylvania State University
