= Coleville, Pennsylvania =

Unincorporated community in Pennsylvania, US

- Unincorporated community
- Location within the state of Pennsylvania Coleville (the United States)
- Coordinates: 40°54′34.22″N 77°47′49.01″W
- Country: United States
- State: Pennsylvania
- County: Centre
- Township: Spring
- Elevation: 860 ft (260 m)
- Time zone: UTC-5 (Eastern (EST))
  - Summer (DST): UTC-4 (EDT)
- GNIS feature ID: 1172202

Coleville is a hamlet mostly in Spring Township, Centre County, Pennsylvania, United States. It is a part of Buffalo Run Valley and the larger Nittany Valley.

== Geography ==
Coleville is north of Bush Addition, west of Bellefonte, south of Sunnyside, and east of Chemical and Valley View.

Buffalo Run converges with Spring Creek in Coleville.

The Coleville Caves are approximately 100 feet long.

== History ==
In the 1880s Coleville grew as a railway town on the main line between of the Bellefonte Central Railroad. The hamlet featured an engine house, shop, brickyard, iron furnaces, saw mills, and a woolen mill.
