= U.S. Route 322 Business (State College, Pennsylvania) =

Business route in Pennsylvania, United States

U.S. Route 322 Business

Route information
- Auxiliary route of US 322
- Maintained by PennDOT
- Length: 8.94 mi (14.39 km)

Major junctions
- West end: I-99 / US 220 / US 322 near State College
- PA 26 in State College; PA 45 in Boalsburg
- East end: US 322 near Boalsburg

Location
- Country: United States
- State: Pennsylvania
- Counties: Centre

Highway system
- United States Numbered Highway System; List; Special; Divided; Pennsylvania State Route System; Interstate; US; State; Scenic; Legislative

U.S. Route 322 Business (US 322 Bus.), designated internally as State Route 3014 (SR 3014), is a 9-mile (14 km) business loop of US 322 in Centre County, Pennsylvania. Its western terminus is located at an interchange with Interstate 99 (I-99)/US 220/US 322 near State College; its eastern terminus is at US 322 near Boalsburg.

== History ==
US 322 Bus. was signed as US 322 until 1981, when the Mount Nittany Expressway, a freeway bypass of US 322, was built north of State College.

US 322 Bus. now serves as the main east–west thoroughfare in State College, and the section in State College is named Atherton Street in honor of George W. Atherton, former president of the Pennsylvania State University.

== Route description ==
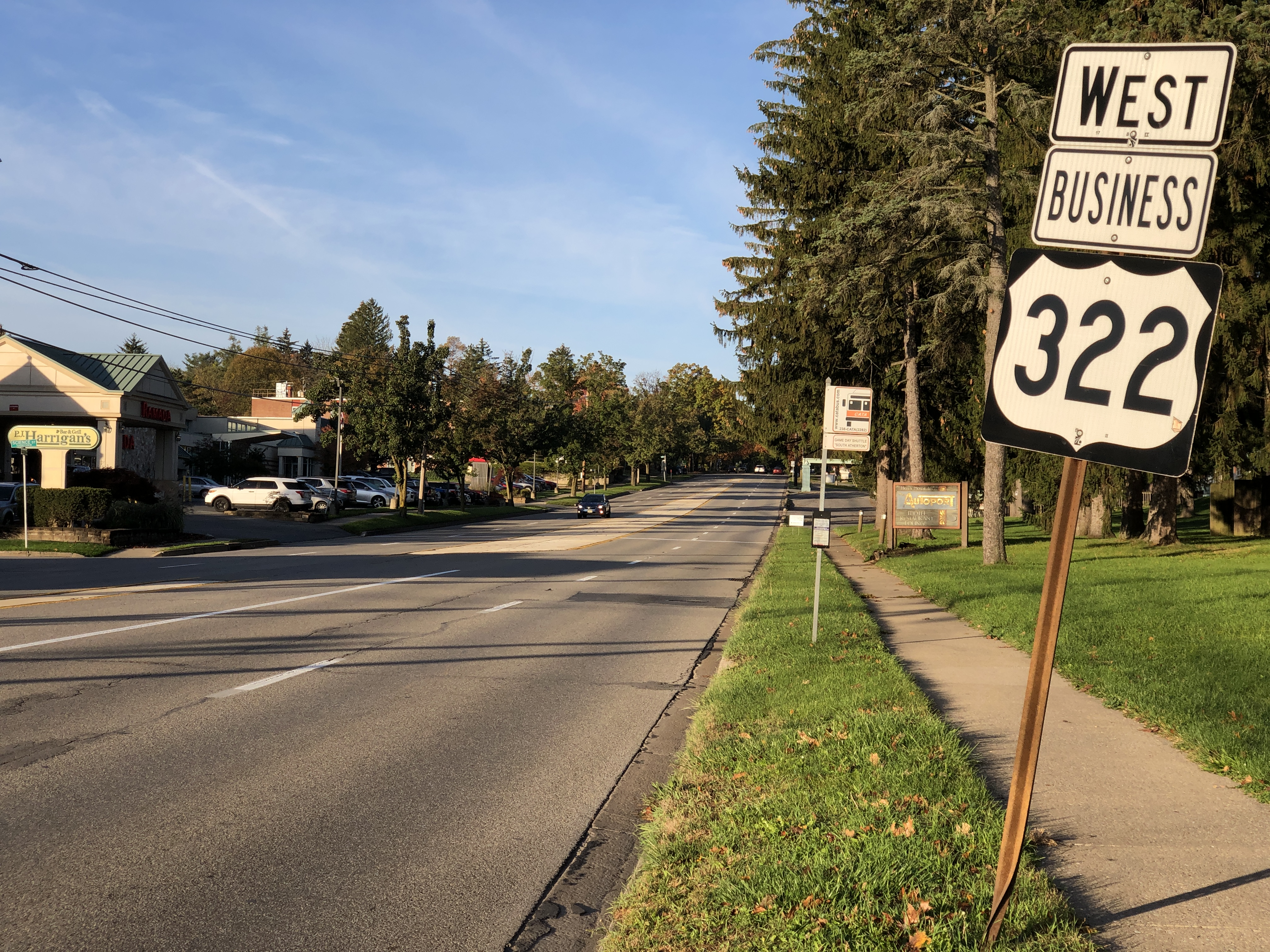
View west along US 322 Bus. at University Drive in State College

US 322 Bus. (designated SR 3014) begins at an interchange with I-99/US 220/US 322 northwest of the borough of State College in Patton Township, Centre County. At this interchange, there is access from westbound US 322 Bus. to southbound I-99/US 220 and westbound US 322 and from northbound I-99/US 220 and eastbound US 322 to eastbound US 322 Bus.; the interchange also has a westbound exit and eastbound entrance connecting to Grays Woods Boulevard and North Atherton Street that provides access to PA 550.

From the I-99/US 220/US 322 interchange, US 322 Bus. heads southeast on North Atherton Street, a four-lane divided highway. The route heads into business areas and comes to an intersection with Valley Vista Drive, which heads north and provides access to northbound I-99/US 220 and eastbound US 322 and from southbound I-99/US 220 and westbound US 322.

The road curves east and becomes a five-lane road with a center left-turn lane. US 322 Bus. runs past more businesses to the north of wooded residential areas in the community of Park Forest Village, passing to the south of the Colonnade at State College shopping center. The route heads through the community of Woodycrest as a four-lane divided highway before it gains a center left-turn lane again and crosses into Ferguson Township, where it turns to the southeast. The road passes a mix of homes and businesses in the community of Overlook Heights.

US 322 Bus. westbound past PA 26 in State College

US 322 Bus. enters the borough of State College and continues southeast through wooded residential neighborhoods as a four-lane undivided road. After crossing Park Avenue, the route passes through the University Park campus of Pennsylvania State University. The roadway runs between university buildings to the northeast, including Rec Hall, and the Penn State Golf Courses to the southwest. The road passes under the university's Information Sciences and Technology Building and runs through more of the university campus, passing northeast of the State College Bus Station serving Greyhound Lines and Fullington Trailways buses.

US 322 Bus. heads into the downtown area of State College, which contains businesses and high-rise buildings consisting of mixed residential and commercial uses. In downtown State College, the route intersects southbound PA 26 at West College Avenue, where the name changes to South Atherton Street, and northbound PA 26 at West Beaver Avenue. Past the downtown area, the road narrows to two lanes and runs through wooded areas of residences with some businesses.

US 322 Bus. gains a center left-turn lane curves to the east-southeast, heading through commercial areas with some homes. After crossing Westerly Parkway, the route becomes a four-lane undivided road that passes through wooded residential neighborhoods, gaining a median past the South Allen Street intersection. The road runs past a mix of homes and businesses and leaves State College for College Township at the East Branch Road intersection.

US 322 Bus. becomes a five-lane road with a center left-turn lane and runs through a mix of development and farmland, passing through the community of Harris Acres. The route enters Harris Township and runs through wooded areas of homes before coming to an intersection with PA 45 and Warner Boulevard, the latter of which heads north to an interchange with the US 322 freeway.

At this point, PA 45 turns east for a concurrency with US 322 Bus., and the two routes head east-southeast on four-lane divided Boal Avenue. The road passes south of the Pennsylvania Military Museum before it heads past homes and businesses in the community of Boalsburg.

PA 45 splits from US 322 Bus. by heading northeast on Earlystown Road while US 322 Bus. continues east along Boal Avenue, narrowing to a two-lane undivided road. The route turns northeast and runs through residential areas.

US 322 Bus. comes to its eastern terminus at an interchange with US 322 (which also carries PA 144 Truck at this point), with access from eastbound US 322 Bus. to eastbound US 322 and from westbound US 322 to westbound US 322 Bus.

== Major intersections ==
The entire route is in Centre County.

Location	mi	km	Destinations	Notes
Patton Township	0.0	0.0	I-99 south / US 220 south / US 322 west to PA 550 – Altoona, Philipsburg, Grays Woods, Waddle	Western terminus; access to PA 550/Waddle via Atherton Street; access to Grays Woods via Grays Woods Blvd.
Patton Township			I-99 north / US 220 north / US 322 east to PA 26 north – Bellefonte	Access via Valley Vista Drive; exit 69 on I-99
State College	3.6	5.8	PA 26 south (West College Avenue) – Huntingdon	West end of PA 26 overlap
State College	3.7	6.0	PA 26 north (West Beaver Avenue) – Bellefonte	East end of PA 26 overlap
Harris Township	7.1	11.4	PA 45 west (Shingletown Road) – Water Street	West end of PA 45 overlap
Harris Township	7.9	12.7	PA 45 east (Earlystown Road) – Centre Hall, Lewisburg	East end of PA 45 overlap
Harris Township	9.0	14.5	US 322 east (PA 144 Truck south) – Potters Mills, Lewistown	Eastern terminus
1.000 mi = 1.609 km; 1.000 km = 0.621 mi: Concurrency terminus
