= Scotia, Pennsylvania =

Ghost town in Pennsylvania, US

- Ghost town
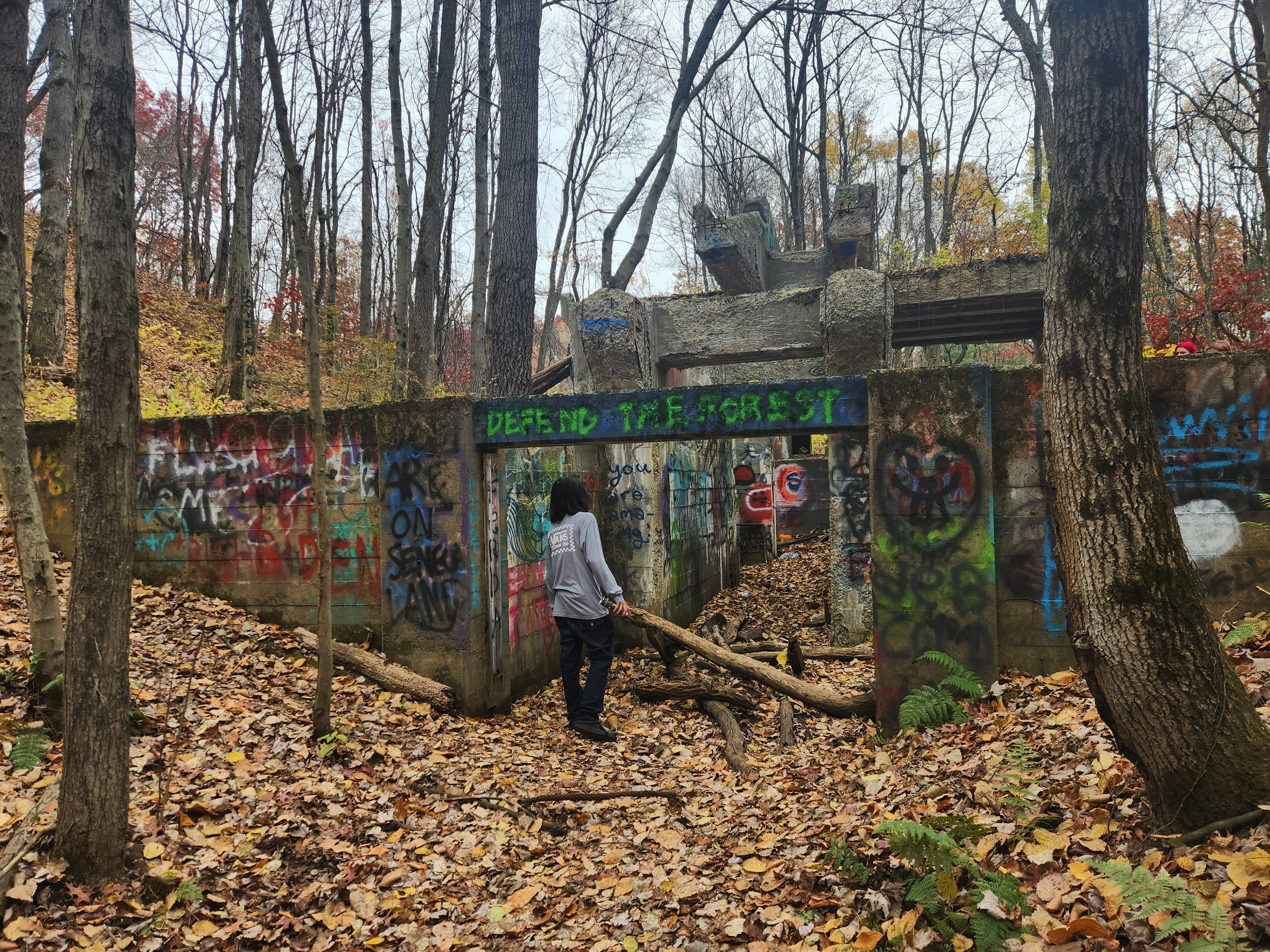
- The Ruins of Scotia, Pennsylvania

- Location within the U.S. state of Pennsylvania Scotia (the United States)
- Coordinates: 40°47′59.22″N 77°56′46.01″W
- Country: United States
- State: Pennsylvania
- County: Centre
- Township: Patton
- Time zone: UTC-5 (Eastern (EST))
  - Summer (DST): UTC-4 (EDT)
- Postal code: 16870
- Area code: 814
- GNIS feature ID: 1204595

Scotia is a ghost town located in Patton Township, Centre County, Pennsylvania. Although the community was called Scotia, the name of the local post office was Benore. (Ben is Gaelic for "mountain [of]" but further etymology of the name is unknown.)

== History ==
Andrew Carnegie leased five hundred acres from Moses Thompson in the iron ore rich pine barrens in the Nittany Valley. The area had been surface-mined since the early nineteenth century for local furnaces. Carnegie sought to finance a mining operation for his modern furnaces in Pittsburgh.

He convinced the Pennsylvania Railroad to extend the line that traveled from Tyrone to Fairbrook to terminate in the barrens.

In 1880 Carnegie bought multiple land tracts and financed company housing, a store, a church, an office building, stables, and an ore washer.

Scotia's population peaked at about 400 people, growing to include a civic center with a small library, a baseball team, and a band called the Forest Cornet Band.

In 1899 Carnegie sold the iron works at Scotia to the Bellefonte Furnace Company. The mines would close in 1911. The Scotia Barrens was the site of a lumber operation connected to a sawmill in Waddle until about 1915. These operations along with fires have destroyed all the original forests. The Federal government spent $500,000 to reopen the mines in the wake of World War II, but the ore was considered poor quality and the mines were again shut down and abandoned.

== Scotia Barrens ==
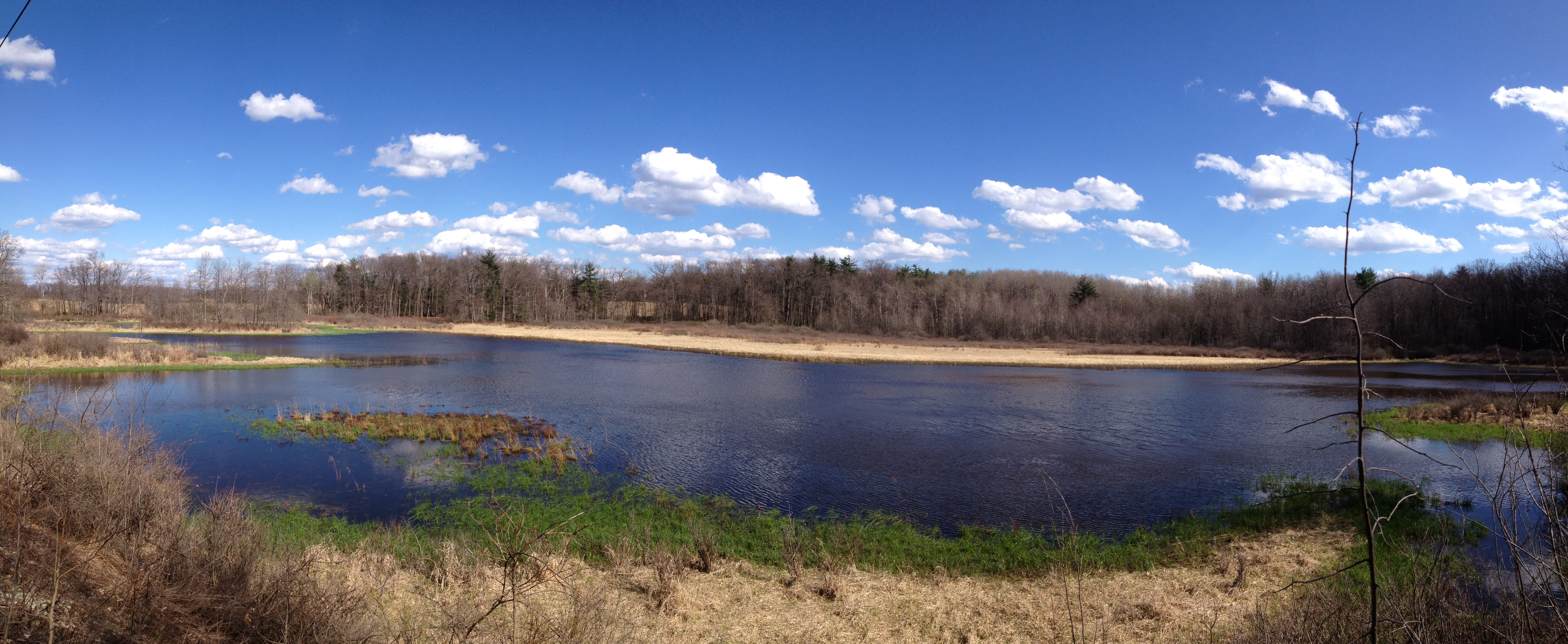
Scotia Barrens

The Scotia Barrens have a micro climate known as a frost pocket. Air from the ridge tops rushes down and gets trapped in the low lying area, making the Scotia Barrens usually colder than the surrounding areas.

=== Ecology ===
The Barrens are biologically diverse and are home to endangered plant and wildlife. The Scotia Barrens are one of the largest pitch pine/scrub oak barrens left in Pennsylvania, and the habitat of a high diversity and number of birds, including over thirty-three species of warblers, and the northern saw-whet owl.

=== Parks and Recreation ===
The Barrens lie on the 6,200 acres of State Game Lands #176. The Game Lands include paths for hiking, biking, and horseback riding, as well as a shooting range.

The ruins of the ore washing site are covered in graffiti and serve as an attraction for hikers.
