= Fillmore, Pennsylvania =

Unincorporated community in Pennsylvania, US

- Unincorporated community
- Location within the state of Pennsylvania Fillmore (the United States)
- Coordinates: 40°51′32.22″N 77°52′35.01″W
- Country: United States
- State: Pennsylvania
- County: Centre
- Township: Patton and Benner
- Elevation: 968 ft (295 m)
- Time zone: UTC-5 (Eastern (EST))
  - Summer (DST): UTC-4 (EDT)
- GNIS feature ID: 1174751

Fillmore is a hamlet on the border line of Patton and Benner Township, Centre County, Pennsylvania, United States. It is part of Happy Valley and the larger Nittany Valley.

== Geography ==
Fillmore is located northeast of Waddle, northwest of the State College Regional Airport, southwest of Hunter's Park, and south of Unionville. The hamlet is on Pennsylvania Route 550 locally known as Buffalo Run Road.

== History ==
Fillmore was the only post office between Stormstown and Bellefonte for a long time, beginning in 1833. The hamlet was once a stop on the Bellefonte Central Railroad. In 2024 the Fillmore United Methodist Church caught on fire.
