= Huston Township, Centre County, Pennsylvania =

Township in Pennsylvania, US

Coordinates: 40°52′35″N 78°00′59″W

- Township
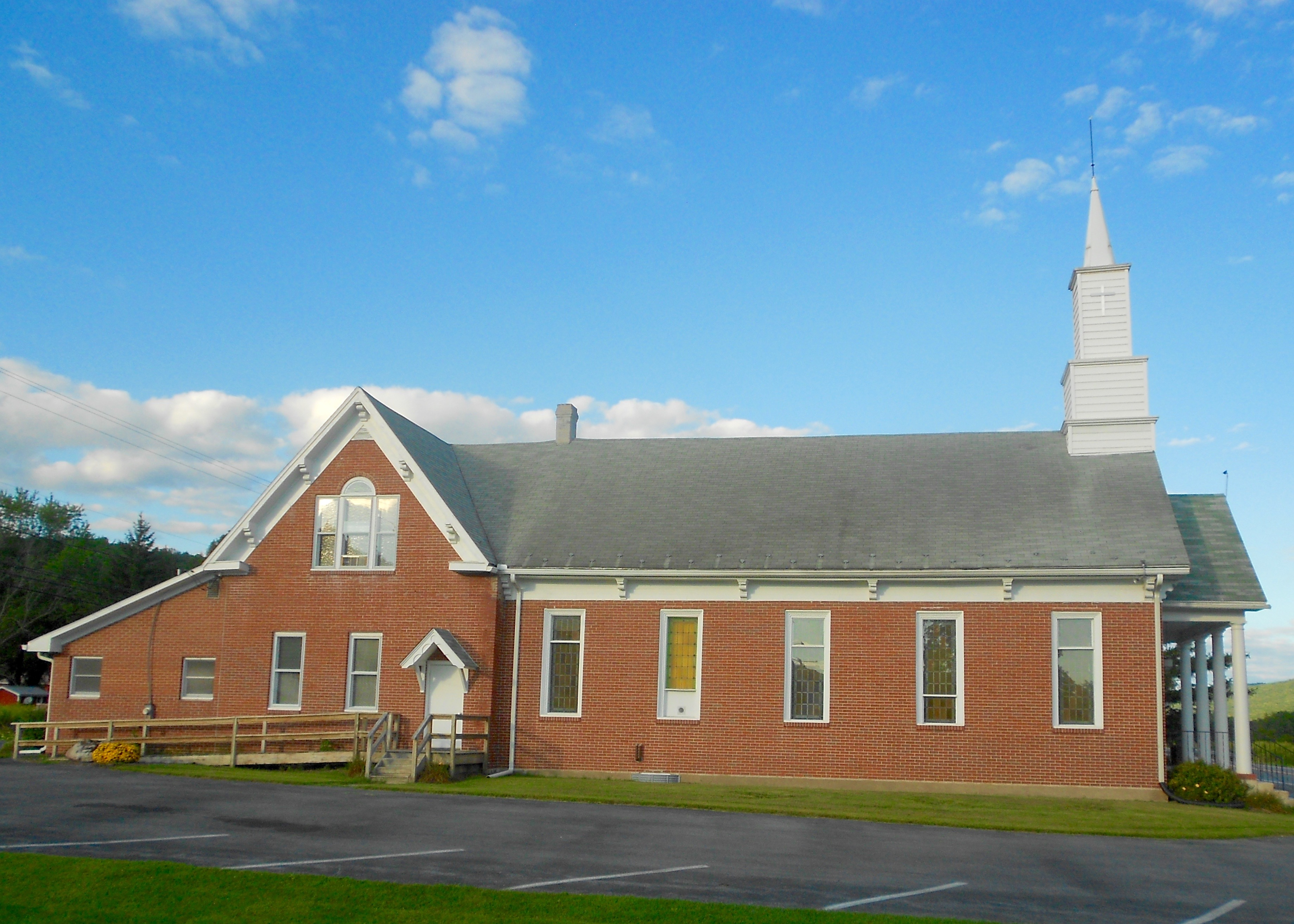
- Bald Eagle Baptist Church

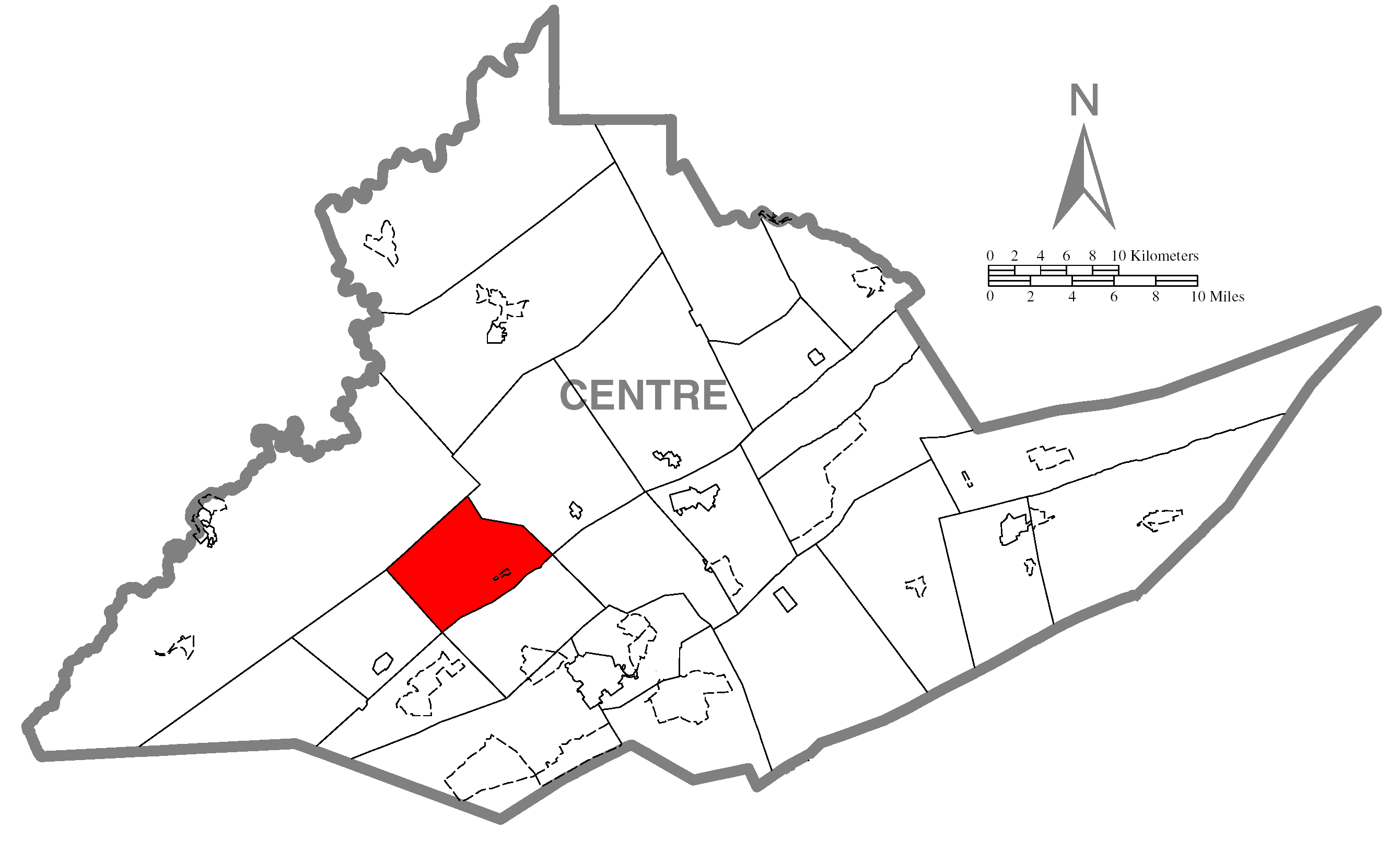
- Map of Centre County, Pennsylvania highlighting Huston Township

- Map of Centre County, Pennsylvania
- Country: United States
- State: Pennsylvania
- County: Centre
- Settled: 1784
- Incorporated: 1838

Area
  - Total: 25.60 sq mi (66.30 km^{2})
  - Land: 25.60 sq mi (66.30 km^{2})
  - Water: 0 sq mi (0.00 km^{2})

Population (2020)
  - Total: 1,333 ▼
  - Estimate (2021): 1,329
  - Density: 54.0/sq mi (20.86/km^{2})
- FIPS code: 42-027-36504

Huston Township is a township which is located in Centre County, Pennsylvania. It is part of the State College, Pennsylvania Metropolitan Statistical Area.

The population was 1,333 at the 2020 census.

== Geography ==
Julian, a census designated place, is entirely in the township. The communities of Martha Furnace, Skytop, and Steel Hollow are also in the township. U.S. Alt 220 runs through the township along the communities of Julian, Steel Hollow, and Martha Furnace. Interstate 99 and U.S. Route 322 also briefly pass through the township along Skytop.

According to the United States Census Bureau, the township has a total area of 25.6 square miles (66.3 km^{2}), all land.

Huston Township is bordered by Rush Township to the northwest, Union Township to the northeast, Patton Township to the southeast and Worth Township to the southwest.

== Demographics ==
Historical population
| Census | Pop. | Note | %± |
|---|---|---|---|
| 2000 | 1,311 | | — |
| 2010 | 1,360 | | 3.7% |
| 2020 | 1,333 | | −2.0% |
| 2021 (est.) | 1,329 | | −0.3% |
U.S. Decennial Census

As of the census of 2000, there were 1,311 people, 500 households, and 370 families residing in the township.

The population density was 50.4 inhabitants per square mile (19.5/km^{2}). There were 547 housing units at an average density of 21.0/sq mi (8.1/km^{2}).

The racial makeup of the township was 97.25% White, 0.31% African American, 0.31% Native American, 0.31% Asian, 0.08% Pacific Islander, 0.92% from other races, and 0.84% from two or more races. Hispanic or Latino of any race were 1.53% of the population.

There were 500 households, out of which 32.8% had children under the age of eighteen living with them; 61.6% were married couples living together, 9.0% had a female householder with no husband present, and 26.0% were non-families. 21.2% of all households were made up of individuals, and 7.6% had someone living alone who was sixty-five years of age or older.

The average household size was 2.62 and the average family size was 3.02.

In the township, the population was spread out, with 25.0% under the age of eighteen, 7.0% from eighteen to twenty-four, 31.0% from twenty-five to forty-four, 27.5% from forty-five to sixty-four, and 9.5% who were sixty-five years of age or older. The median age was thirty-seven years.

For every one hundred females, there were 104.5 males. For every one hundred females who were aged eighteen or older, there were 100.2 males.

The median income for a household in the township was $38,500, and the median income for a family was $42,386. Males had a median income of $30,417 compared with that of $26,250 for females.

The per capita income for the township was $16,268.

Roughly 10.3% of families and 13.9% of the population were living below the poverty line, including 19.3% of those who were under the age of eighteen and 10.1% of those who were aged sixty-five or older.
