= Patton Township, Pennsylvania =

Township in Pennsylvania, US

Coordinates: 40°50′00″N 77°54′59″W

- Township
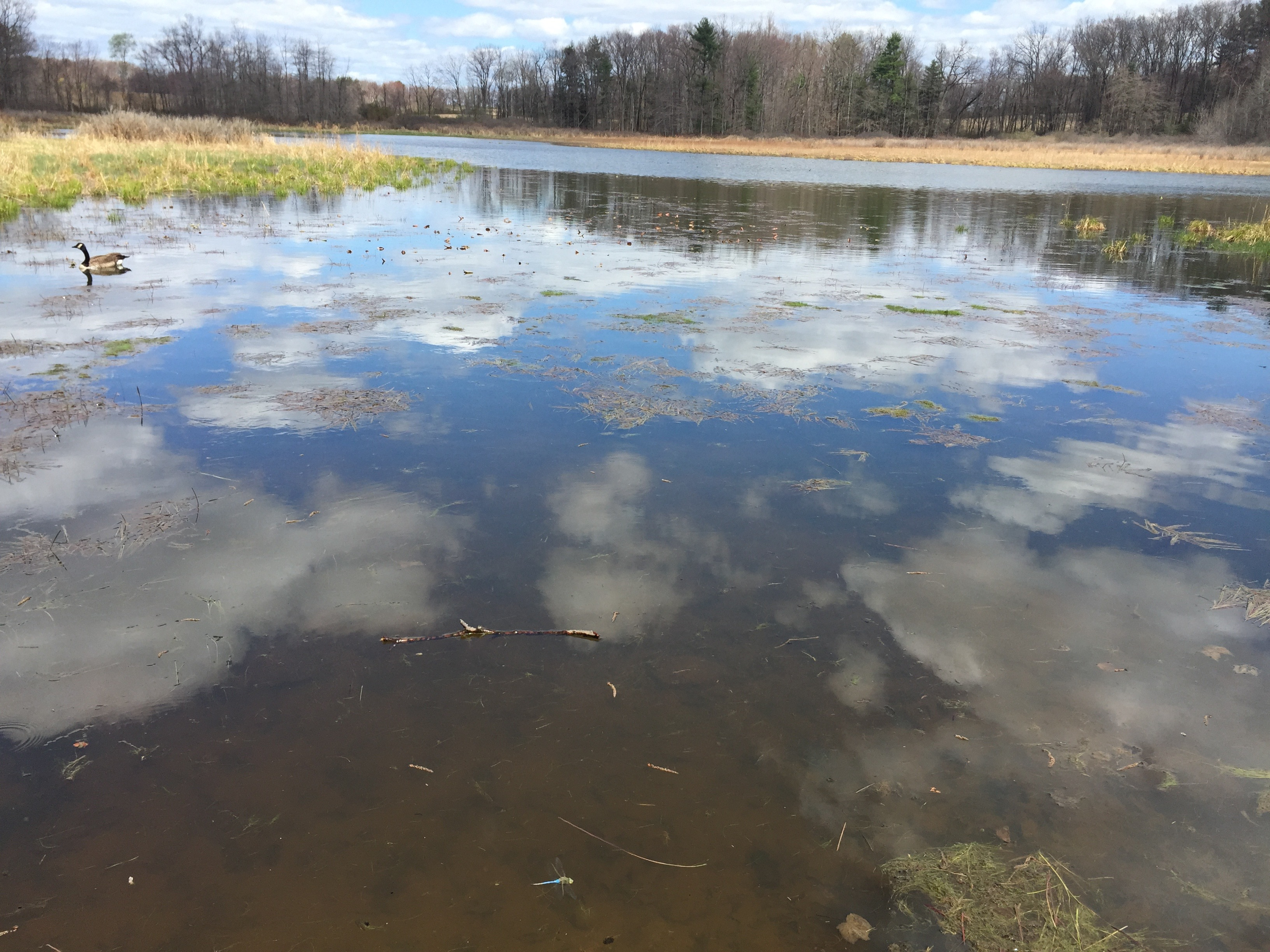
- Ten acre Pond

- Coat of arms

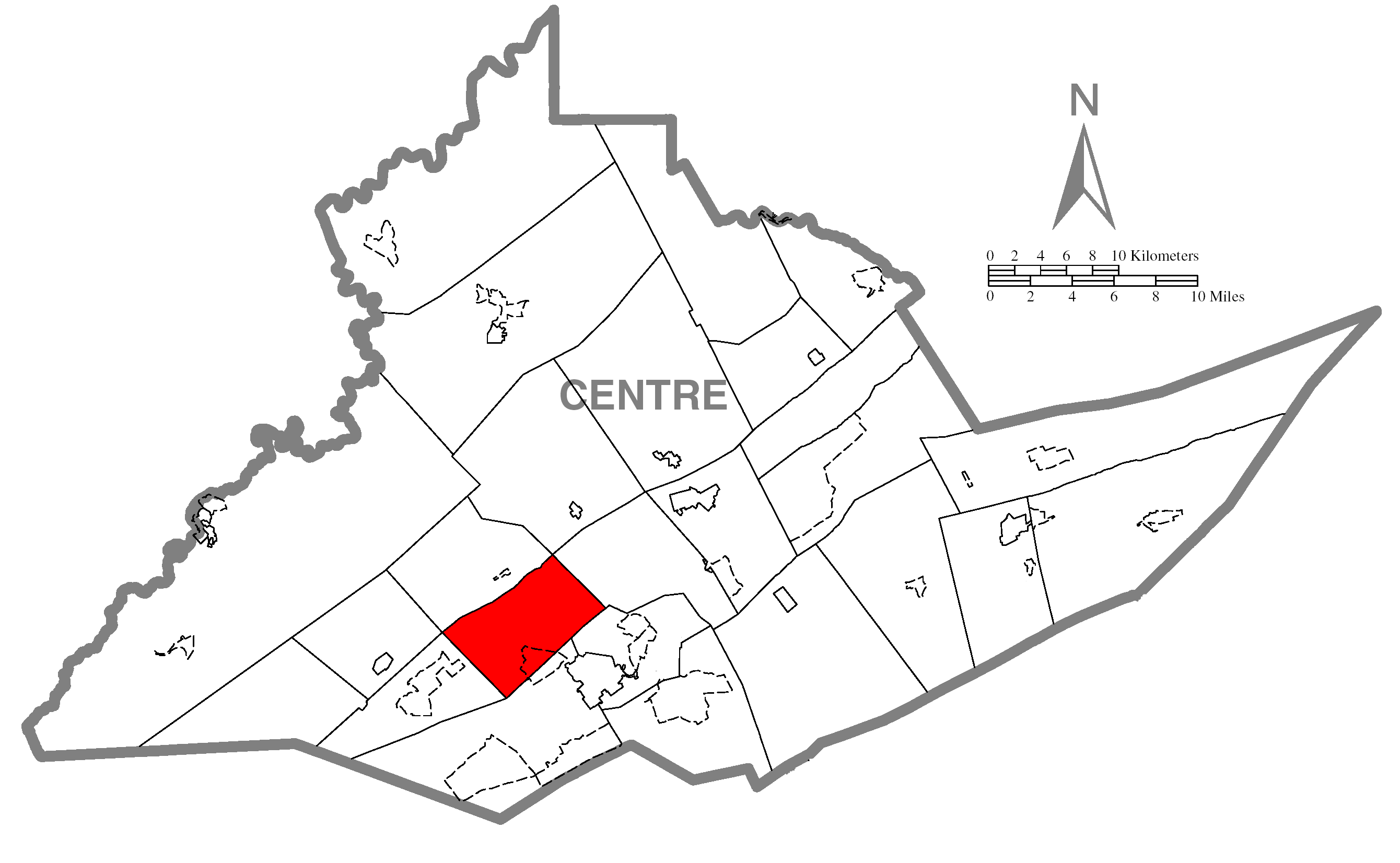
- Map of Centre County, Pennsylvania highlighting Patton Township

- Map of Centre County, Pennsylvania
- Country: United States
- State: Pennsylvania
- County: Centre
- Settled: 1788
- Incorporated: 1794

Government
  - Type: Board of Supervisors
  - Chair: Pamela Robb
  - Vice Chair: Sultan Magruder
  - Supervisors: Elliot Abrams
  - Supervisors: Betsy Whitman
  - Supervisors: Susan Chyczewski

Area
  - Total: 24.55 sq mi (63.58 km^{2})
  - Land: 24.53 sq mi (63.54 km^{2})
  - Water: 0.019 sq mi (0.05 km^{2})

Population (2020)
  - Total: 15,801 ▲
  - Estimate (2021): 15,766
  - Density: 651.7/sq mi (251.64/km^{2})
- Zip code: 16803
- Area code: 814
- FIPS code: 42-027-58440
- Website: twp.patton.pa.us

Historical population
Census	Pop.	Note	%±
1850	453		—
1860	664		46.6%
1870	721		8.6%
1880	761		5.5%
1890	1,045		37.3%
1900	924		−11.6%
1910	907		−1.8%
1920	498		−45.1%
1930	442		−11.2%
1940	790		78.7%
1950	1,289		63.2%
1960	2,401		86.3%
1970	4,394		83.0%
1980	7,409		68.6%
1990	9,971		34.6%
2000	11,420		14.5%
2010	15,311		34.1%
2020	15,801		3.2%

Patton Township is a township in Centre County, Pennsylvania, United States. It is part of the Happy Valley and the larger Nittany Valley.

Patton Township is served by the Patton Township Police Department, Alpha Fire Company, and Centre LifeLink EMS. Alpha Fire Company maintains one of its two substations in Patton Township.

== Geography ==
According to the United States Census Bureau, the township has a total area of 24.55 square miles (63.58 km^{2}), of which 24.53 square miles (63.54 km^{2}) is land and 0.019 square miles (0.05 km^{2}), or 0.07%, is water.

Patton Township is bordered by Huston Township to the northwest, Benner Township to the northeast, College Township to the southeast, Ferguson Township to the south, and Halfmoon Township to the southwest.

=== Neighborhoods ===
- Fillmore
- Grays Woods
- Park Forest Village (census-designated place)
- Scotia
- Skytop
- Toftrees (census-designated place)
- Waddle
- Woodycrest

== History ==
Patton Township was established in 1794 and named after Colonel John Patton, a revolutionary officer, who co-owned the Centre Furnace, along with Colonel Samuel Miles. The Peter Gray family and the Conrad Hartsock family were the earliest settlers to the area. They came to the Half Moon Valley in 1788, from Frederick County, Maryland, and settled in what is now Patton Township. The early days were strongly influenced by Methodism. As soon as Peter Gray had a roof on his log cabin, he began Sunday School classes, and founded what is today Grays United Methodist Church. These settlers also made pilgrimages to church at Warriors Mark, a 12-mile distance, because that was the nearest regular preaching point in the valley.

Iron mining had begun in the early days of Patton Township, affording supply of ore for Centre Furnace. Scotia, a company town established by Andrew Carnegie, was one of the largest mining operations in the area. Scotia's population peaked at 400 in the 1890s before the mines closed in 1911. Lumber was sourced from the Scotia Barrens for a sawmill in Waddle from 1910 until 1915.

In 1927 Woodycrest would begin as an unplanned community out of W.A. Strouse's 65-acre farm. Strouse sold plots of land for $20 to $50 each. At the time the main road from Woodycrest to State College was a dirt road that meandered from College Heights to Waddle. In 1930 Patton Township recorded its lowest population (442) prior to the construction of North Atherton Street and Skytop Mountain Road from Downtown State College to Martha's Furnace in 1932. In the same year, Lytle's addition, an affordable working class community, was annexed by Borough of State College from College Township. As prices in Lytle's addition rose, residents moved into Woodycrest.

In 1956 construction began in Park Forest, a planned community split between Ferguson and Patton Townships that would grow to become the most populous census-designated place in Centre County. In 1967 Park Forest Elementary School was built and Park Forest Middle School followed in 1971 in Park Forest's North End. In 1968 construction began in Toftrees, a medium-density planned community north of Woodycrest. In 1990 construction began in Gray’s Woods, a planned community near the ghost town Scotia. Gray's Woods Elementary School would be built in 2002.

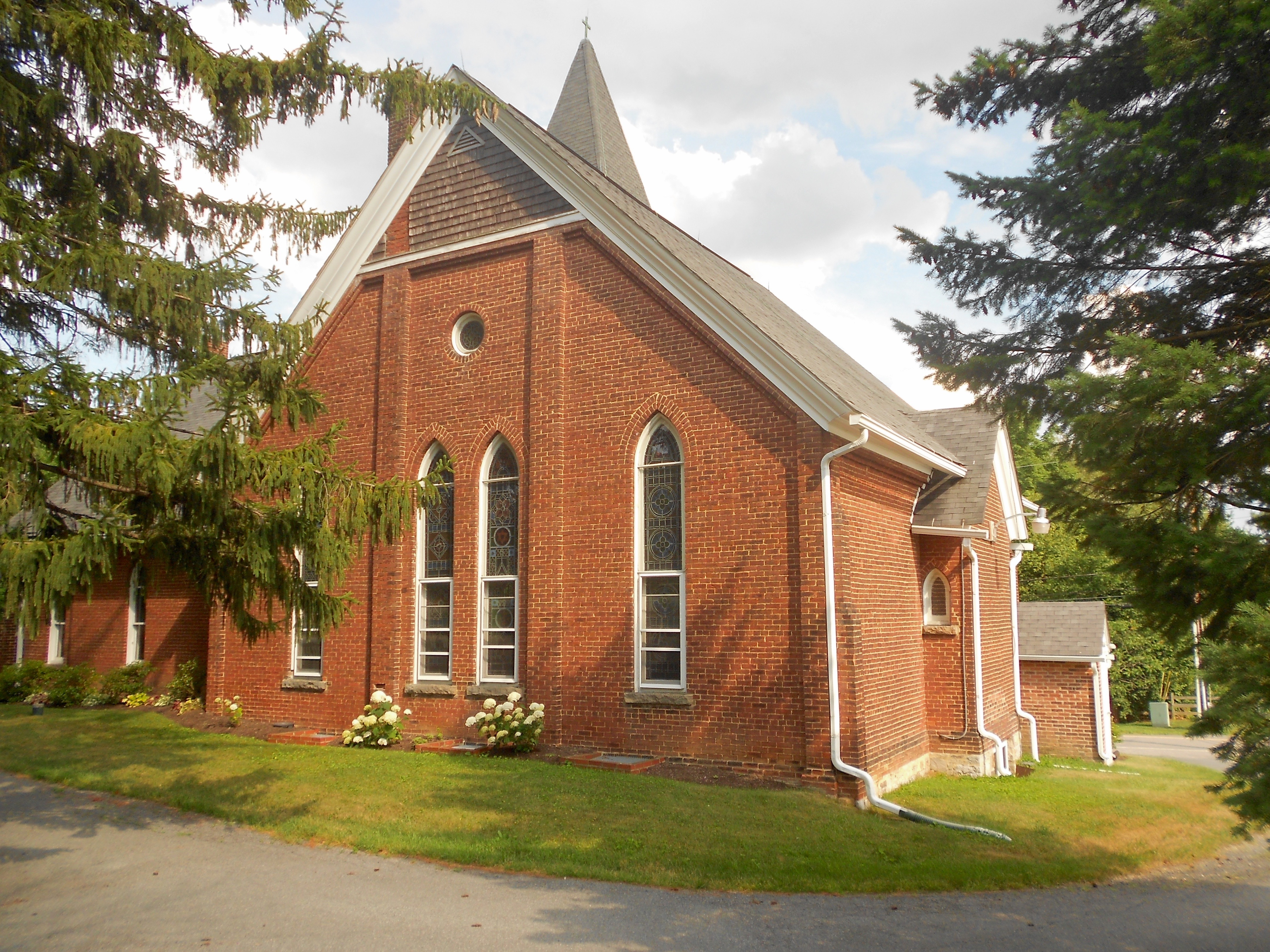
Grays United Methodist Church

== Demographics ==
As of a 2015 census estimate, the township was 77.3% Non-Hispanic White, 9.3% Black or African American, 1.5% Native American Alaska Native, 9.7% Asian, 1.3% Some other race, and 3.8% were Two or More Races. Hispanics and Latinos (of any race) were 3.6% of the population.

As of the census of 2000, there were 11,420 people, 4,791 households, and 2,472 families residing in the township. The population density was 460.1 inhabitants per square mile (177.6/km^{2}). There were 4,974 housing units at an average density of 200.4 per square mile (77.4/km^{2}). The racial makeup of the township was 89.24% White, 3.55% African American, 0.13% Native American, 4.48% Asian, 0.06% Pacific Islander, 0.81% from other races, and 1.73% from two or more races. Hispanic or Latino of any race were 2.16% of the population.

There were 4,791 households, out of which 24.5% had children under the age of 18 living with them, 43.8% were married couples living together, 5.4% had a female householder with no husband present, and 48.4% were non-families. 28.1% of all households were made up of individuals, and 4.1% had someone living alone who was 65 years of age or older. The average household size was 2.38 and the average family size was 2.93.

In the township the population was spread out, with 19.1% under the age of 18, 24.5% from 18 to 24, 30.8% from 25 to 44, 19.0% from 45 to 64, and 6.6% who were 65 years of age or older. The median age was 28 years. For every 100 females there were 106.2 males. For every 100 females age 18 and over, there were 104.7 males.

The median income for a household in the township was $41,993, and the median income for a family was $61,503. Males had a median income of $41,064 versus $27,284 for females. The per capita income for the township was $22,860. About 3.9% of families and 18.1% of the population were below the poverty line, including 6.1% of those under age 18 and 1.9% of those age 65 or over.

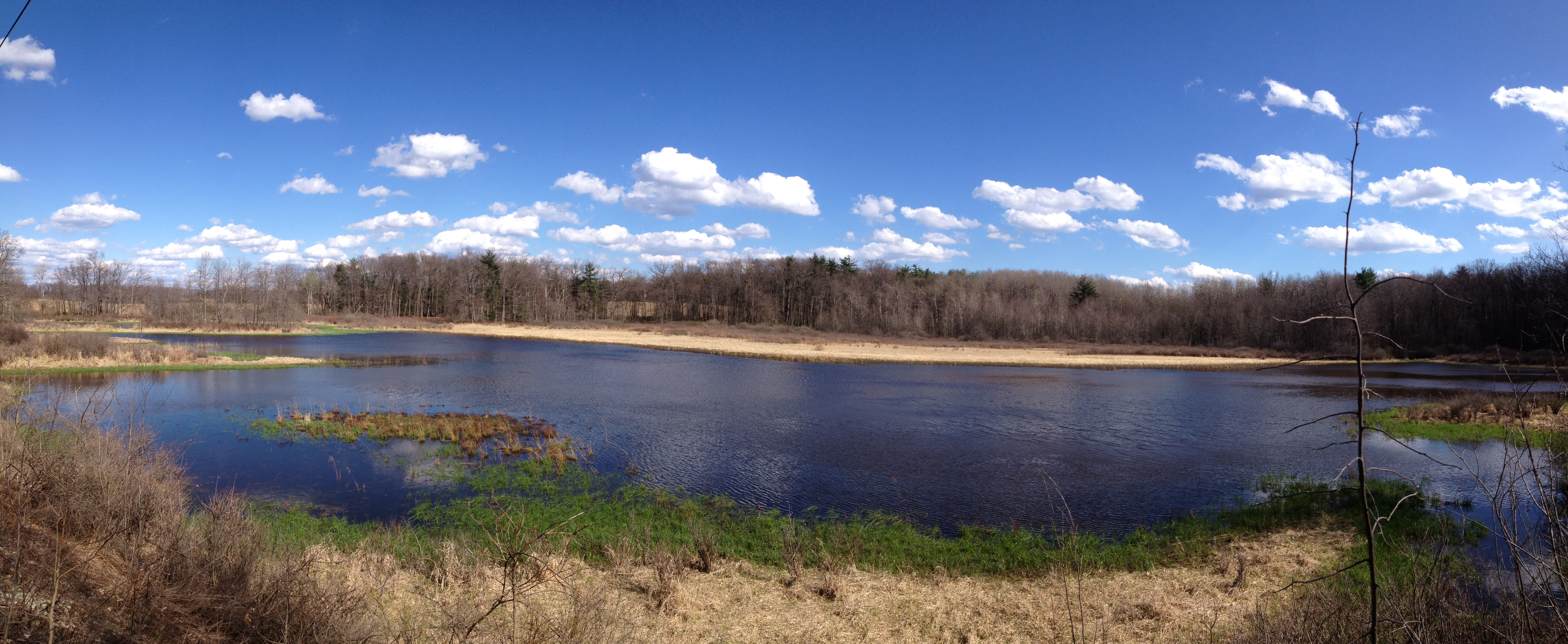
Ten Acre Pond near Scotia

== Transportation ==
The Centre Area Transportation Authority provides local bus service with fixed routes between Patton Township and the borough of State College as well as College, and Ferguson Township.

=== Roads ===
Highways include:

- U.S. Route 322 Business
- U.S. Route 322
- Interstate 99
- Pennsylvania Route 550
