= Waddle, Pennsylvania =

Unincorporated community in Pennsylvania, US

- Unincorporated community
- Location within the state of Pennsylvania Waddle (the United States)
- Coordinates: 40°50′2″N 77°56′5″W
- Country: United States
- State: Pennsylvania
- County: Centre
- Township: Patton
- Elevation: 1,109 ft (338 m)
- Time zone: UTC-5 (Eastern (EST))
  - Summer (DST): UTC-4 (EDT)
- GNIS feature ID: 1198307

Waddle is a populated place in Patton Township, Centre County, Pennsylvania, United States. It is part of the Buffalo Run Valley, Happy Valley, and the larger Nittany Valley.

== Geography ==
Waddle is at the foothills of the Bald Eagle Mountain. It is north of Grays Woods, west of Fillmore, south of Julian, and east of Skytop. Buffalo Run, a tributary of Spring Creek, flows through the community.

Waddle is off of exit 68 Grays Woods/Waddle on Interstate 99. Pennsylvania Route 550 locally known as Buffalo Run Road passes through Waddle.

== History ==
In the 1880s Waddle grew as a railway town on the main line between Bellefonte and State College. The Bellefonte Central Railroad added lines from Waddle to the mines near Scotia. This allowed ore to be shipped straight to Bellefonte, as opposed to via Tyrone. In 1910 the McNitt-Huyett Lumber Company built a large sawmill in Waddle, connected to the pine barrens near Scotia. Up until the construction of North Atherton Street and Skytop Mountain Road from Downtown State College to Martha's Furnace in 1932, the main road into Waddle from State College was a dirt road from College Heights. Rail service between Waddle and State College ended in 1976.
