= Skytop, Centre County, Pennsylvania =

Unincorporated community in Pennsylvania, US

Skytop, Pennsylvania
- Unincorporated community
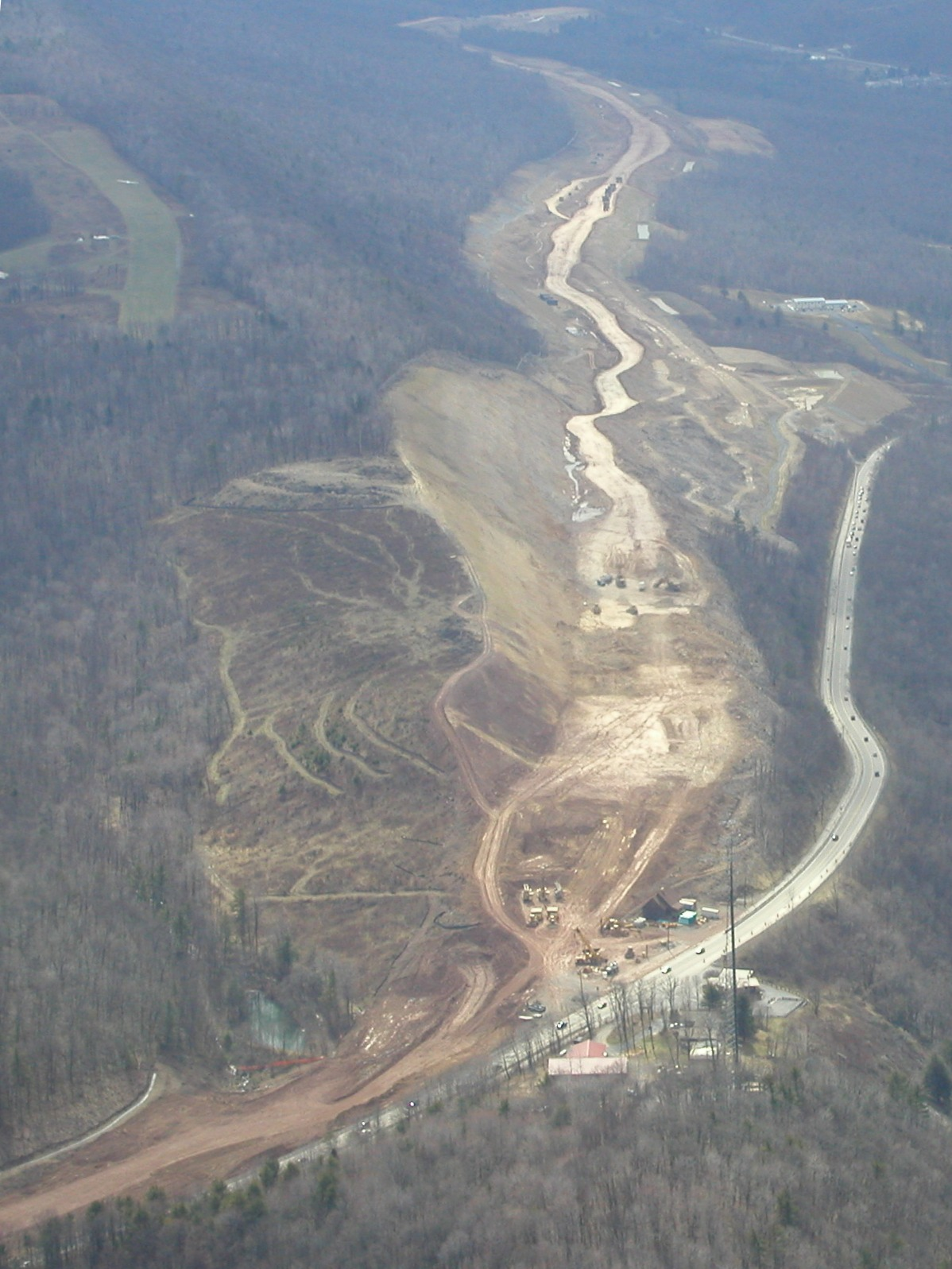
- 2002 photo of I-99 excavation at Skytop

- Location within the U.S. state of Pennsylvania Sky Top (the United States)
- Coordinates: 40°49′50.22″N 77°57′57.02″W
- Country: United States
- State: Pennsylvania
- County: Centre
- Township: Patton and Huston
- Elevation: 1,378 ft (420 m)
- Time zone: UTC-5 (Eastern (EST))
  - Summer (DST): UTC-4 (EDT)
- ZIP code: 16803
- GNIS feature ID: 1180556

Skytop is a neighborhood and an unincorporated community in Patton Township and Huston Township, Centre County, Pennsylvania, United States. It is partially in Happy Valley and the larger Nittany Valley, and partially in the Bald Eagle Valley.

== Geography ==
The neighborhood lies atop the Bald Eagle Ridge locally known as Skytop Mountain. The Skytop wind gap has been a route of passage between the Nittany and Bald Eagle Valleys originally traversed by the first inhabitants of the valleys, currently being utilized by Interstate 99 and Skytop Mountain Road. Skytop is north of Gray's Woods, east of Stormstown, west of Waddle, and south of Steel Hollow, Bald Eagle Creek, and Martha Furnace.

Skytop is home to the Skytop Mountain Golf Club, Skytop Machine & Tool, and Sky Top Chiropractor among other homes, businesses, and farms.
