= Toftrees, Pennsylvania =

Unincorporated community in Pennsylvania, US

- Census-designated place
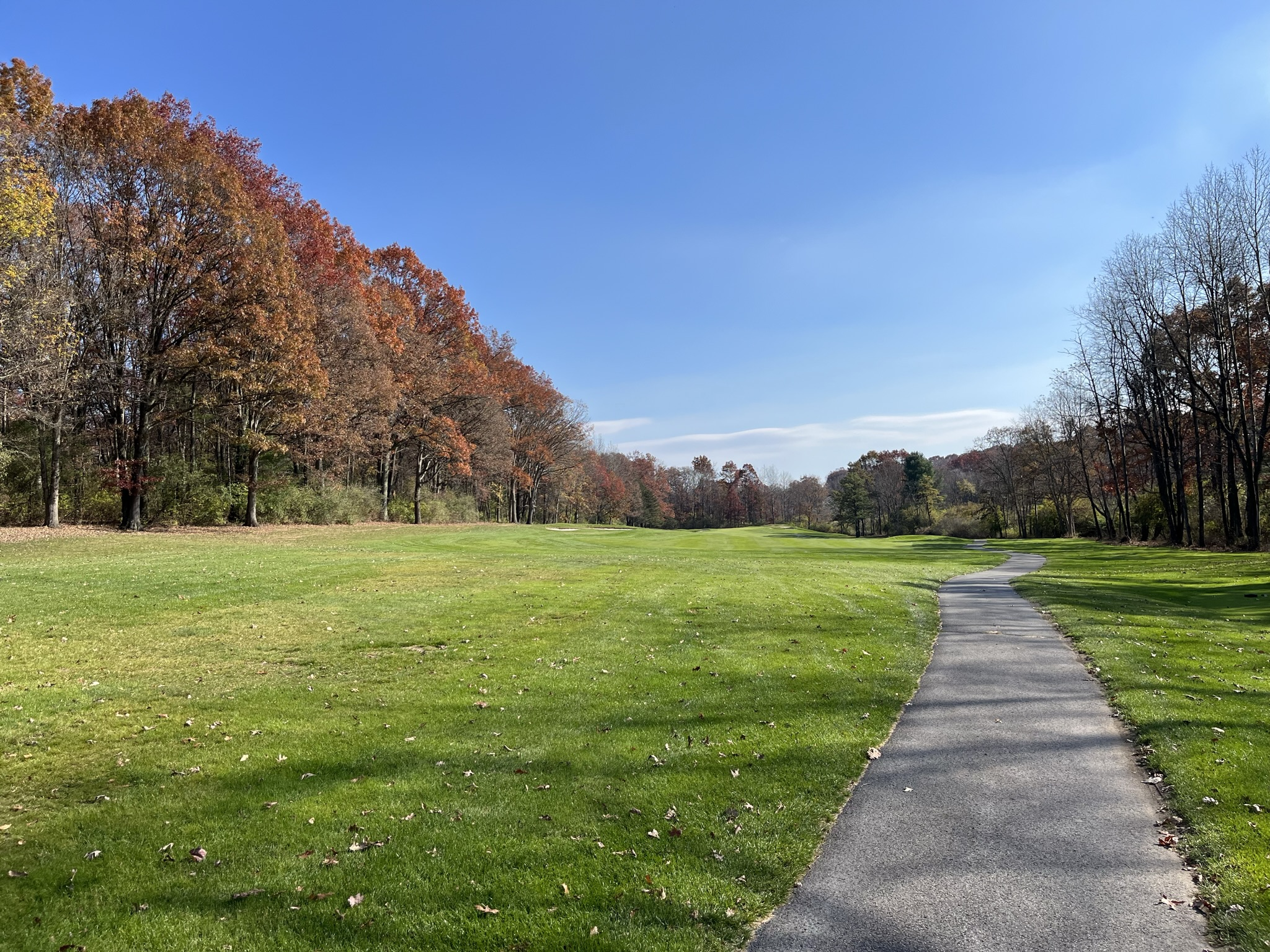
- Toftrees Golf Resort

- Map showing Centre County in Pennsylvania

- Location in Pennsylvania Toftrees (the United States)
- Coordinates: 40°49′25″N 77°53′19″W
- Country: United States
- State: Pennsylvania
- County: Centre
- Township: Patton

Area
  - Total: 0.88 sq mi (2.27 km^{2})
  - Land: 0.88 sq mi (2.27 km^{2})
  - Water: 0 sq mi (0.0 km^{2})
- Elevation: 1,240 ft (380 m)

Population (2010)
  - Total: 2,053
  - Density: 2,338/sq mi (902.6/km^{2})
- Time zone: UTC-5 (Eastern (EST))
  - Summer (DST): UTC-4 (EDT)
- ZIP code: 16803
- Area code: 814
- FIPS code: 42-77016
- GNIS feature ID: 2633699

Toftrees is a census-designated place in Patton Township, Pennsylvania, United States. It is located 3.5 miles (5.6 km) northwest of the center of State College on the north side of Interstate 99/U.S. Route 322. The hilltop community surrounds the Toftrees Golf Resort. As of the 2010 census, the population of the community was 2,053.

== Demographics ==
=== 2020 census ===
As of the 2020 census, Toftrees had a population of 3,513. The median age was 26.6 years. 6.3% of residents were under the age of 18 and 14.4% of residents were 65 years of age or older. For every 100 females there were 104.8 males, and for every 100 females age 18 and over there were 104.0 males age 18 and over. The population density was 3,992 inhabitants per square mile (1,541/km^{2}).

100.0% of residents lived in urban areas, while 0.0% lived in rural areas.

There were 1,832 households in Toftrees, of which 8.3% had children under the age of 18 living in them. Of all households, 24.0% were married-couple households, 35.3% were households with a male householder and no spouse or partner present, and 34.6% were households with a female householder and no spouse or partner present. About 44.1% of all households were made up of individuals and 7.7% had someone living alone who was 65 years of age or older.

There were 2,193 housing units, of which 16.5% were vacant. The homeowner vacancy rate was 1.8% and the rental vacancy rate was 7.4%.

Racial composition as of the 2020 census
Race	Number	Percent
White	2,474	70.4%
Black or African American	195	5.6%
American Indian and Alaska Native	4	0.1%
Asian	630	17.9%
Native Hawaiian and Other Pacific Islander	3	0.1%
Some other race	18	0.5%
Two or more races	189	5.4%
Hispanic or Latino (of any race)	168	4.8%

=== Income and poverty ===
The median income for a household in the CDP was $74,405. 15% of the population were living below the poverty line.
