= Park Forest Village, Pennsylvania =

Unincorporated community in Pennsylvania, US

Park Forest Village
- Census-designated place
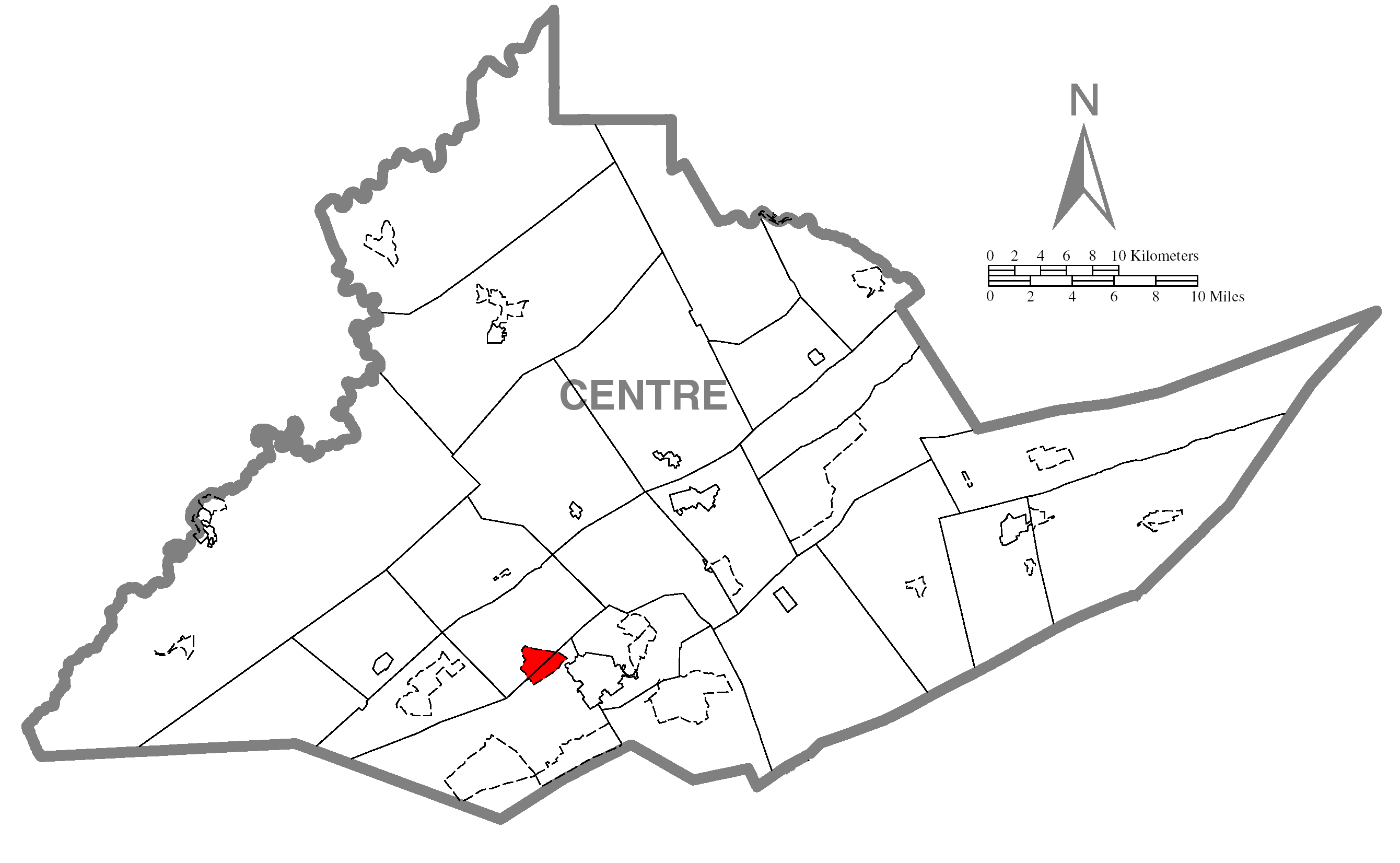
- Location within Centre County

- Location within the U.S. state of Pennsylvania Park Forest Village (the United States)
- Coordinates: 40°48′4″N 77°54′34″W
- Country: United States
- State: Pennsylvania
- County: Centre
- Townships: Patton, Ferguson

Area
  - Total: 2.49 sq mi (6.46 km^{2})
  - Land: 2.49 sq mi (6.46 km^{2})
  - Water: 0 sq mi (0.00 km^{2})
- Elevation: 1,350 ft (410 m)

Population (2020)
  - Total: 8,831
  - Density: 3,543.3/sq mi (1,368.08/km^{2})
- Time zone: UTC-5 (Eastern (EST))
  - Summer (DST): UTC-4 (EDT)
- ZIP codes: 16803
- Area code: 814
- FIPS code: 42-58036
- GNIS feature ID: 1183297

Park Forest Village is an unincorporated area and census-designated place (CDP) in Patton and Ferguson townships, Centre County, Pennsylvania, United States. It is part of the State College, Pennsylvania Metropolitan Statistical Area. The population was 8,831 at the 2020 census.

== History ==
Park Forest Village, created in 1956, was the first large suburban development near State College. This neighborhood won several national awards for its design, which moved away from the straight streets and clear cutting typical of post World War II suburban developments. The use of gracefully curved streets and the retention of trees established a pattern for future developments everywhere.

== Geography ==
Park Forest Village is located in southern Centre County at 40°48′4″N 77°54′34″W (40.801060, -77.909423). The eastern end of the community touches the northwestern corner of the borough of State College. The northern edge of the community is defined by U.S. Route 322 Business (North Atherton Street).

According to the United States Census Bureau, the CDP has a total area of 2.45 square miles (6.35 km^{2}), all land.

== Demographics ==
Historical population
Census	Pop.	Note	%±
2020	8,831		—
U.S. Decennial Census

As of the census of 2010, there were 9,660 people, 3,923 households, and 2,092 families residing in the CDP. The population density was 3,971.3 inhabitants per square mile (1,533.3/km^{2}). There were 4,029 housing units at an average density of 1,656.4/sq mi (639.6/km^{2}). The racial makeup of the CDP was 78.5% White, 3.8% Black or African American, 0.1% Native American, 10.8% Asian, 1.0% from other races, and 2.6% from two or more races. Hispanic or Latino of any race were 3.2% of the population.

There were 3,923 households, out of which 23.7% had children under the age of 18 living with them, 43.9% were married couples living together, 2.6% had a male householder with no wife present, 6.8% had a female householder with no husband present, and 46.7% were non-families. 24.0% of all households were made up of individuals, and 6.4% had someone living alone who was 65 years of age or older. The average household size was 2.45 and the average family size was 2.87.

In the CDP, the population was spread out, with 17.0% under the age of 18, 25.0% from 18 to 24, 26.0% from 25 to 44, 21.4% from 45 to 64, and 10.6% who were 65 years of age or older. The median age was 29 years. For every 100 females, there were 105.5 males. For every 100 females age 18 and over, there were 106.9 males.

The median income for a household in the CDP was $51,587, and the median income for a family was $74,675. The per capita income for the CDP was $29,387. About 13.0% of families and 22.9% of the population were below the poverty line. However, traditional measures of income and poverty can be very misleading when applied to a community like Park Forest Village, which is located only a few miles from Penn State University and has many student residents.

== Transportation ==
The Centre Area Transportation Authority (CATA) operates the Atherton Street Connector, a fixed bus route which connects Park Forest to State College and College Township. The N, NE, and NV lines connect Park Forest to other parts of Happy Valley via Martin Street and Aaron Drive. W and WE serve the village along Circleville Road; and V and VE serve the village along North Atherton Street.

Highways include:

- U.S. Route 322, locally known as North Atherton Street.

== Education ==
Park Forest is part of the State College Area School District. The village is served by and home to Park Forest Middle School and the State College Area High School.
