= Centre Area Transportation Authority =

Bus transit system in State College, PA

- Bus on Blue Loop at Penn State University
- Founded: 1972
- Headquarters: 2081 W. Whitehall Road; State College, PA 16801
- Locale: State College, Pennsylvania
- Service area: State College, Penn State University
- Service type: Local transit bus service Microtransit service
- Routes: 16 Local; 3 Fare-Free Within PSU Campus and Downtown State College
- Fleet: 92 Buses, 12 Paratransit Vehicles, 12 Vans
- Daily ridership: 20,600 (weekdays, Q2 2026)
- Annual ridership: 4,771,600 (2025)
- Fuel type: CNG
- Chief executive: David Rishel
- Website: catabus.com

The Centre Area Transportation Authority (CATA) is a mass transit agency that provides bus transportation within State College, Pennsylvania and the surrounding areas, as well as Pennsylvania State University. In 2025, the system had a ridership of 4,771,600, or about 20,600 per weekday as of the second quarter of 2026.

== History ==
The corporate logo not used on vehicles

The company first started as Centre Area Transit (CAT), which was formed to provide a vehicle to subsidize public transit throughout the region. Then on May 17, 1974, the Centre Area Transportation Authority (CATA) was incorporated. By the end of its first year, CATA was officially up and running and its annual ridership was 201,000. By 1979, ridership was continuing to grow year after year prompting CATA to add more bus routes as well as additional buses built by General Motors Corporation. It was then in 1990 that ridership had officially hit the two million mark. Currently all of CATA's fleet buses are CNG-powered and ridership has exceeded seven million passengers, the majority of riders being Penn State students.

=== Clean Natural Gas Program ===
In 1993, the CATA Board of Directions made a decision, to start running its buses using Compressed natural gas. With this decision, CATA started the Clean Natural Gas Program, along with Columbia Gas of Pennsylvania, where the buses uses clean-burning compressed natural gas that improves the environment. The fuel conversion became easy, as CATA operates its routes close to where natural gas is produced. By then, a natural gas fueling station was installed in the facility in 1995, where CATA can store all natural gas buses in their facility. In 1996, CATA introduced their first fleet of natural gas buses built by Orion Bus Industries. Following delivery, CATA began working with local officials to install natural gas fueling station, to provide natural gas as a fueling option for the public. From 1997 to 2002, CATA began to expand its facility, by adding more natural gas buses with the new state-of-the-art New Flyer low-floor buses, and more fueling dispenser, to expand its capacity, and more fueling capacity. Then, a canopy was installed above the station in the facility, where CATA will be able to fuel buses out of the snow. Following the entire program, CATA would eventually phase out the remaining GMC diesel-powered buses. The Clean Natural Gas program was completed in 2005, making the first agency in the east coast to have its facility converted to hold natural gas buses.

=== Hydrogen bus project ===
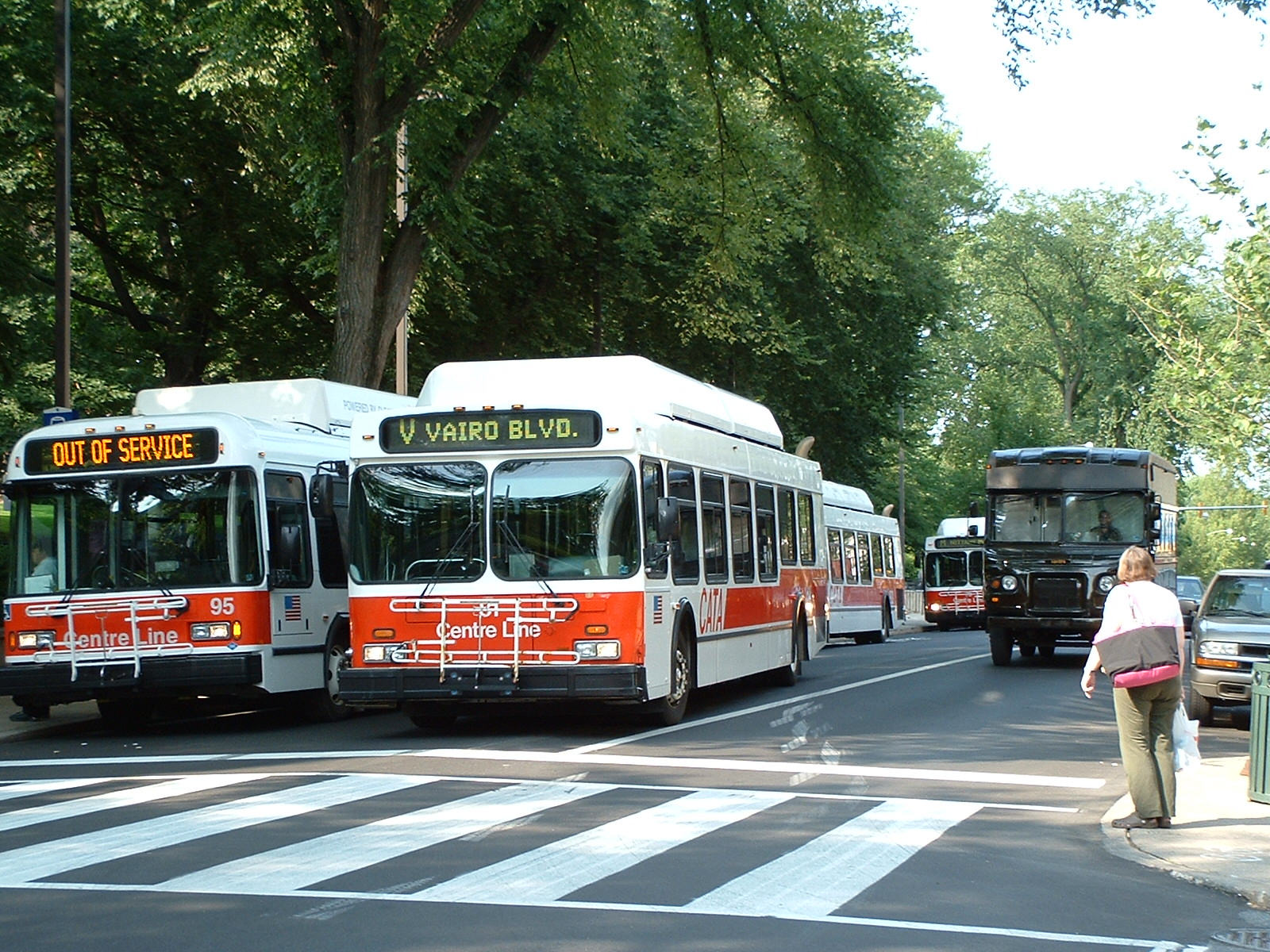
4 buses serving at Penn State University in 2006.

Following the completion of the Clean Natural Gas program, CATA continued to experiment more alternate fueling option, by joining with Penn State and Larson Transportation Institute. In 2006, the CATA board began to research to have the fleet to run on Hydrogen fuel cell. With the research, one of CATA's buses (Bus #85) was converted to a hydrogen-powered bus, to be a part of an extensive hydrogen demonstration project that is being conducted by Penn State's Pennsylvania Transportation Institute (PTI). Air Products & Chemicals of Allentown, Pennsylvania and Collier Technologies of Reno, Nevada in 2007. This bus was studied for a possibility to use Hydrogen as a fuel for public transportation in Penn State. PTI was able to get funding by the Pennsylvania Department of Environmental Protection and the Pennsylvania Department of Community and Economic Development to convert one of CATA's forty-foot New Flyer C40LF buses to run on a hydrogen/natural-gas blend (HCNG). The project was suspended as of 2009.

=== 2012 Fleet Upgrades ===
In the summer of 2012, CATA took a delivery of 28 brand new 40' New Flyer Xcelsior CNG-powered buses. Those buses replaced the 16 40' Orion V buses and also the 9 35' New Flyer C35LF LYNX buses (#38-45 and #47) from Orlando, FL. All of the Xcelsior buses are 40' despite the fact that nine replaced 35' buses. This replacement plan also allowed CATA to make a net gain of 3 40' buses in their fleet, as only 25 buses were replaced.

== Fare-Free Routes ==
In the fall of 1999, CATA and Penn State came up with an agreement in which CATA would take over all bus transportation on campus, which would be fare-free. Four routes were created as part of the agreement: The Blue and White Loops (in conjunction with the school's colors), and the Red and Green Links (the latter of which is no longer in service). The three current routes, Blue/White Loops and Red Link, run during the fall and spring semesters. Only Blue Loop and White Loop run on the summer and operate under a limited-service schedule. No Loop or Link services run on Sundays during summer except special events. All three routes have service modifications on football gamedays.

Route	Destination (A)	Destination (B)	Service
Blue Loop	Jordan East Parking on Porter Road		Clockwise loop around campus via College Ave.; Gamedays: Runs via Bigler Road
White Loop	Schlow Library on Beaver Avenue		Counter-clockwise loop around campus via Beaver Ave.; Gamedays: Runs via Computer Building on Bigler Road
Red Link	West Deck	Porter Rd. at Medlar Field	Only during full service; Gamedays: Terminates at Computer Building on Bigler Road - Runs via Curtin Road

== Major Service Routes ==
CATA's service routes (also known as the "Centre Line") travel around the Penn State campus, downtown State College, and the surrounding areas. All routes run under full service during fall and spring semesters, and only a limited number run during reduced service in the summer.

Route	Route Corridor	Destination (A)	Destination (B)	Service
AC	Atherton Street Connector	Colonnade Blvd	Scenery Park	Full-time; No Sunday Service
CC	College Avenue Connector	Benner Pike	Downtown (Research Dr)	Full-time; Weekday Commuter Service (west of Butz Street) for 4 morning/4 evening trips
H	Toftrees / Trader Joe's Plaza	Trader Joe's Plaza	PSU Campus/Downtown	Full-time; No Sunday Service; Limited Service to The Village at Penn State
HU	Toftrees Ave	Toftrees Ave	PSU Campus	Express Service; Weekdays Only (Fall & Spring Semesters only)
N	Martin Street / Aaron Drive	Colonnade Blvd	PSU Campus/Downtown	Full-time; No Sunday Service
NE	Martin Street / Aaron Drive Express	Northbrook Greens	PSU Campus	Express Service; Weekdays Only (Fall & Spring Semesters only)
NV	The Heights / Martin St. / Vairo Blvd. / Toftrees / Downtown	Toftrees	Downtown	Clockwise Community Service; Part-time; Late Night (after 10:00pm) and Sunday Service
R	Waupelani Drive	Research Drive	PSU Campus/Downtown	Full-time; No Sunday Service
RC	Waupelani Drive Express	Research Drive	PSU Campus	Express Service; Weekdays Only (Fall & Spring Semesters only)
RP	Waupelani/Downtown	Waupelani Drive	Downtown	Part-time; Late Night (after 10:00pm) and Sunday Service
UP	Parkway Plaza / University Dr. / Campus / Downtown	Allen Street Gates	Waupelani Dr.	No Midday Service (11:00am-4:00pm); No Weekend Service
V	Vairo Blvd.	Colonnade Blvd	PSU Campus/Downtown	Full-time; No Sunday Service
VE	Vairo Blvd. Express	Vairo Blvd	PSU Campus	Express Service; Weekdays Only (Fall & Spring Semesters only)
VN	Downtown / Toftrees / Vairo Blvd. / Colonnade / Martin St. / The Heights	Downtown	The Heights	Counterclockwise Community Service; Sundays Only; Trial Route for Summer Reduced Service
W	Valley Vista	Valley Vista Drive / Geisinger Gray's Woods	PSU Campus/Downtown	Full-time; No Sunday Service; Limited Service to Geisinger Gray's Woods
WE	Havershire Blvd. Express	The Heights	PSU Campus	Express Route; Weekdays Only (Fall & Spring Semesters only)

=== Summer-Only Route ===
Starting in Summer 2024, CATA is introducing the SY - Summer Circulator Route, serving downtown State College. This service runs on College Avenue, Westerly Parkway, Pugh Street, and Beaver Avenue. The service runs full-time during the summer reduced service schedule.

=== College Avenue Connector (CC) Commuter Route ===
In February 2024, CATA restored service to Cato Park after eliminating service as a part of CATA's mid-year service changes. A special commuter service was added to the College Avenue Connector route west of Butz Street. There are four round-trip services scheduled in the morning and four round-trip services in the evening, both of which connect to the full-service College Avenue Connector route. The commuter service is in effect until August 2024.

=== Gameday Football Shuttle ===
During home Penn State football games, CATA also runs two special service routes which serve as the gameday football shuttle. The Downtown Shuttle runs on a loop through downtown State College en route to Beaver Stadium, with bus stops placed in front of a number of various hotels located along the route. The other route is the South Atherton Shuttle which also runs from a designated parking lot in the Hills Shopping Center to Beaver Stadium, allowing fans to park their cars and take the shuttle to the stadium.

== Past Service Routes ==
As of May 2024, only 16 routes are in operation by CATA. Many of the previous service routes have been eliminated through service changes. Some of the routes have been replaced with CATAGO micro transit service, including Bellefonte, Boalsburg, Pine Grove Mills, Pleasant Gap, and Cato Park.

Route	Route Corridor	Destination (A)	Destination (B)	Service
A	Park Forest Village	Park Forest	PSU Campus/Downtown	Part-time; Weekdays Only
B	Boalsburg	Boalsburg	PSU Campus/Downtown	Part-time; Weekdays Only
C	Houserville	Houserville	PSU Campus/Downtown	Part-time; Weekdays Only
F	Pine Grove Mills	The Meadows	PSU Campus/Downtown	Part-time; Weekdays Only
G	Stormstown	Stormstown	PSU Campus/Downtown	Part-time; Weekdays Only
HM	Toftrees Nittany Mall	Northbrook Greens	Nittany Mall	Full-time
K	Cato Park	Cato Park	PSU Campus/Downtown	Part-time; No Sunday Service
P	Tussey Mountain	Tussey Mountain	PSU Campus/Downtown	Full-time; No Sunday Service
S	Science Park	Science Park	PSU Campus/Downtown	Part-time; Weekdays Only
XB	Bellefonte	Bellefonte	PSU Campus/Downtown	Part-time; No Sunday Service
XG	Pleasant Gap	Pleasant Gap	PSU Campus/Downtown	Part-time; No Sunday Service
Green Link	PSU Campus	PSU Campus (Stadium Commuter Lots)	PSU Campus (Pattee Transit Center)	Fall/Spring Semesters Only; No Weekend Service

== Fare Information ==
CATA uses three different payment options for fares: cash, tokens, or passes. Tokens can be purchased using credit or debit cards, cash, or LionCash (only at the CATA Customer Service Center on Beaver Avenue). Tokens cost $2.20 each or $42 for a roll of 20 tokens. Tokens can be purchased on the Penn State Campus at the HUB-Robeson Center Information Desk, Findlay Commons Desk, Pollock Commons Desk, Redifer Commons Desk, Warnock Commons Desk, and White Course Commons Desk. Tokens can also be purchased in downtown State College at the Student Book Store, McLanahan's Student Store, and the CATA Customer Service Center. Passes can be purchased as a day pass on the Token Transit app or as a OnePass through CATA.

- $2.20 for each bus route (excluding the Blue Loop, White Loop, and Red Link).
- Senior citizens 65 and older: Free
- Individuals with disabilities: Half Fare ($1.10)

== Fleet ==
CATA operates 71 buses for its fixed routes. CATA also has 8 Paratransit mini-buses and 45 vans for vanpools.

Year	Builder	Model	Powertrain (Engine/Transmission)	Fleet Number (Quantity)	Length (ft.)	Fuel Propulsion	Notes
2004	New Flyer	C40LF	Cummins Westport C Gas Plus; Voith D863.3E	62-70 (9)	40	CNG	Ex-CENTRO, acquired in 2018.; 62-67 have suburban seating, while 68-70 have transit seating.; Currently stored.
2011–2012	New Flyer	XN40; Xcelsior	Cummins Westport ISL-G; Voith D864.5	2-29 (28)	40	CNG	Entered service in mid-2012
2014–2015	New Flyer	XN40; Xcelsior	Cummins Westport ISL-G; Voith D864.5	30–31, 37-46 (12)	40	CNG	
2014	Ford	F550; Cutaway Van	6.8L Ford Modular engine; Unknown	32-36 (5)	32	CNG	* Operates under CATARIDE/CentreRide
2019	Gillig	Low Floor	Cummins Westport L9N; Voith D864.6	47-61 (15)	40	CNG	Replaced the 1996–1998 New Flyer Low Floor buses.
2020	New Flyer	XN60; Xcelsior	Cummins Westport L9N; Voith D864.6	100-104 (5)	60	CNG	* First articulated buses for CATA.: Entered in service on September 7, 2020
2020	New Flyer	XN40; Xcelsior	Cummins Westport L9N; Voith D864.6	200-205 (6)	40	CNG	Replacing the remaining C40LFs.; Entered in service on September 5, 2020
2022	New Flyer	XN60; Xcelsior	Cummins Westport L9N; Voith D864.6	105 (1)	60	CNG	

=== Retired Fleet ===
Year	Builder	Model	Powertrain (Engine/Transmission)	Fleet Number (Quantity)	Length (ft.)	Year Retired	Notes
1983	Neoplan USA	AN435A	Detroit 6V92TA; Allison HT-747	20-21 (2)	35	1998	Replaced by the 1998 New Flyer C35LF.
1983	Neoplan USA	AN440A	Detroit 6V92TA; Allison HT-747	22-31 (10)	40	1998	Replaced by the 1998 New Flyer C40LF.
1985	Gillig	Phantom	Detroit 6V92TA; Allison HT-747	26-31 (6)	40	2009	Ex-Pierce Transit, acquired in 2000.; Replaced by the 1997 New Flyer L35LF, which was formerly operated by LYNX.; Last diesel buses operated by CATA.
1996	Orion	Orion V CNG (05.501)	Detroit S50G; Allison WB-400R	50-65 (16)	40	2015	First CNG buses operated by CATA.; Only Orion buses that CATA operated; Replaced by the 2014–2015 New Flyer XN40.
1996	New Flyer	C40LF	Detroit S50G; Allison WB-400R	98-99 (2)	40	2019	Previously operated by BARTA and IndiGo; Replaced by the 2019 Gillig Low Floor CNGs
1997	New Flyer	C35LF	Detroit S50G; Allison WB-400R	38-47 (10)	35	2012–2014	Ex-LYNX, acquired in 2008; Originally ran in LNG fuel
1997	New Flyer	C35LF	Detroit S50G; Allison WB-400R	48-49 (2)	35	2014–2015	Ex-Rabbit Transit; Originally ran in LNG fuel
1997	New Flyer	C35LF	Detroit S50G; Allison WB-400R	66-73 (8)	35	2015	Originally ran in LNG fuel
1998	New Flyer	C35LF	Detroit S50G; Allison WB-400R	74-77 (4)	35	2019–2020	Replaced by the 2019 Gillig Low Floor CNGs
1998	New Flyer	C40LF	Detroit S50G; Allison WB-400R	78-83 (6)	40	2019	Replaced by the 2019 Gillig Low Floor CNGs; 80 is sold to a private owner.
2000	New Flyer	C40LF	Detroit S50G; Allison WB-400R	84-93 (10)	40	2020	Replaced by the 2020 New Flyer XN40s

=== CNG Buses ===
In the summer of 2009, Orlando, FL's Central Florida's Regional Transportation Authority (LYNX) donated 10 35' New Flyer buses to CATA. These buses were donated because of CATA's extensive knowledge of CNG powered systems. These buses are most frequently seen on the lower capacity routes, although they occasionally appear on the N, V, R, and NV routes. These buses replaced the six Gillig Phantoms in CATA's fleet.

== Future Enhancements ==
=== Bus Replacement Project ===
In January 2008, CATA officially received $1.4 million in federal funding earmarks through the Transportation/HUD Appropriations bill for the 2008 fiscal year. With these funds, CATA will begin a fleet replacement project where 10 of the 16 Orion buses will be replaced with newer low-floor CNG-powered models. Following that, the remaining six buses will eventually be replaced with 4 articulated buses to accommodate the demand on the N, R, and V routes during rush-hour on weekdays as well as Penn State football games and other high-profile events.
