= Hollidaysburg Historic District =

Historic district in Pennsylvania, United States

- U.S. National Register of Historic Places
- U.S. Historic district
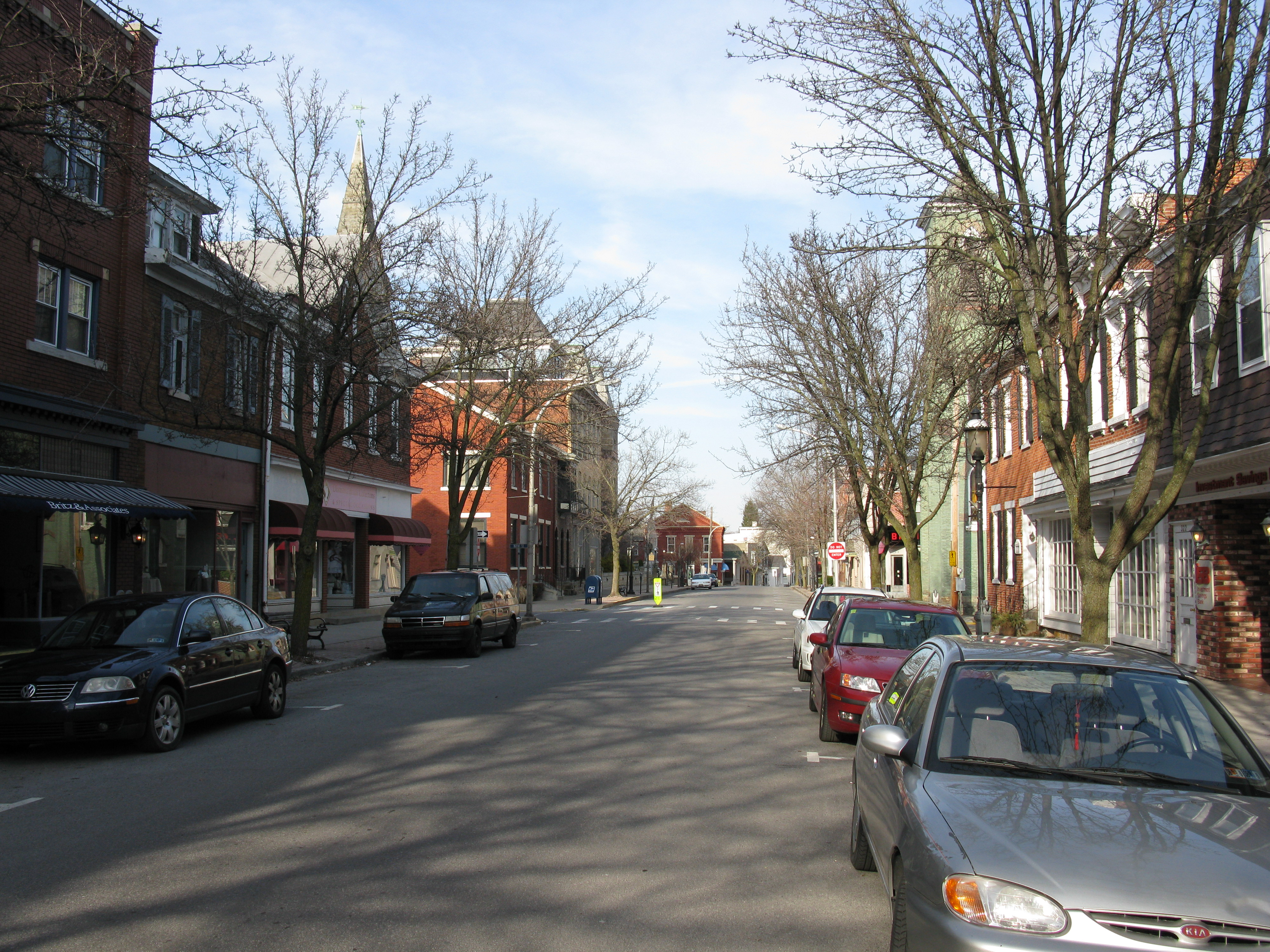
- Hollidaysburg Historic District, March 2008

- Location within Pennsylvania Location within the United States
- Location: Roughly bounded by Spruce, Bella, Blair, and Juniata Sts., Hollidaysburg, Pennsylvania
- Coordinates: 40°25′48″N 78°23′29″W
- Area: 102.3 acres (41.4 ha)
- Architect: Multiple
- Architectural style: Mid 19th Century Revival, Late Victorian, Federal
- NRHP reference No.: 85003158
- Added to NRHP: December 26, 1985

The Hollidaysburg Historic District is a national historic district which is located in Hollidaysburg, Blair County, Pennsylvania.

== History and architectural features ==
This district includes four hundred and twenty-six contributing buildings, which are located in the central business district and surrounding residential areas of Hollidaysburg. The buildings are primarily frame and brick, with some dating as early as the 1830s.

Notable non-residential buildings include the African Methodist Episcopal Church, which was erected in 1885, the King-McClanahan House, which was built circa 1864 and is now the Allegheny Street bed and breakfast, the Mattern's Orchard House, which was erected in 1830 and is now Holliday Real Estate LLC, the Presbyterian Church, which was built between 1869 and 1870, the Blair County Jail, which was erected in 1868, the Condron Opera House, which was built circa 1870, the Citizen's National Bank Building, which was erected in 1902, the U.S. Post Office building, which was erected in 1917, and the Hollidaysburg Trust Company Building, which was erected in 1924.

Located in this historic district, but separately listed, are the Blair County Courthouse and Highland Hall.

Before permission is granted for exterior modifications to structures within this district, applications for renovations must first be reviewed by the Historic Architecture Review Board (HARB). Seven members serve on the HARB, each of whom are appointed by the Hollidaysburg Borough Council to serve a three-year term. Board members must also be a member of the Historic Preservation Commission, but may be non-residents of the Borough.

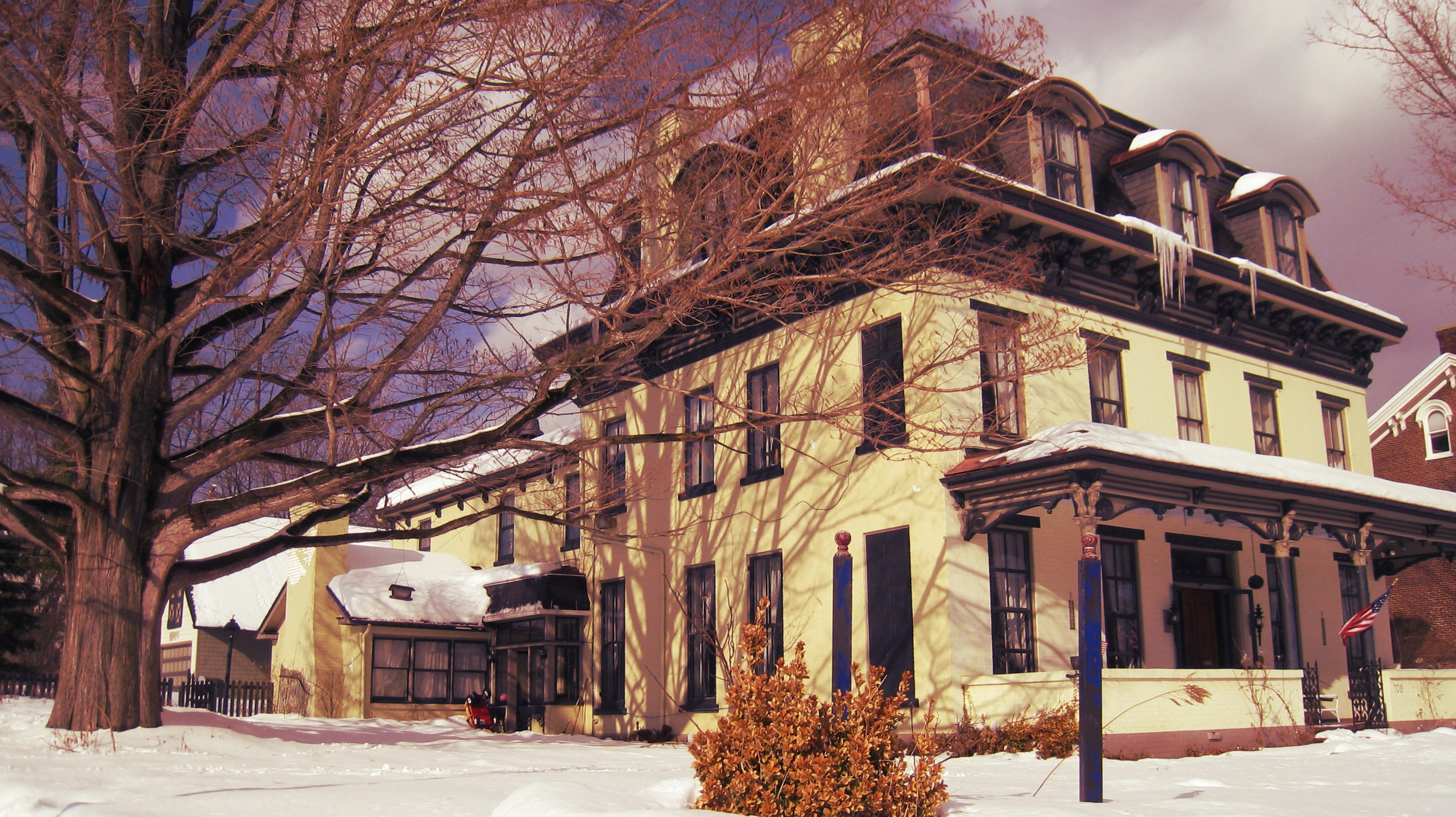
The King-McClanahan house in 2014
