= Toy Story =

1995 film by John Lasseter

- Theatrical release poster
- Directed by: John Lasseter
- Screenplay by: Joss Whedon; Andrew Stanton; Joel Cohen; Alec Sokolow
- Story by: John Lasseter; Pete Docter; Andrew Stanton; Joe Ranft
- Produced by: Bonnie Arnold; Ralph Guggenheim
- Starring: Tom Hanks; Tim Allen; Annie Potts; John Ratzenberger; Don Rickles; Wallace Shawn; Jim Varney
- Edited by: Robert Gordon; Lee Unkrich
- Music by: Randy Newman
- Production company: Pixar Animation Studios
- Distributed by: Buena Vista Pictures Distribution (Note: Distributed under the Walt Disney Pictures banner.)
- Release dates: November 19, 1995 (El Capitan Theatre); November 22, 1995 (United States)
- Running time: 81 minutes
- Country: United States
- Language: English
- Budget: $30 million
- Box office: $401.2 million

Toy Story is a 1995 American animated adventure comedy film directed by John Lasseter, and written by Joss Whedon, Andrew Stanton, Joel Cohen, and Alec Sokolow. The first entirely computer-animated feature film, as well as the first feature film produced by Pixar Animation Studios for Walt Disney Pictures, it stars the voices of Tom Hanks, Tim Allen, Annie Potts, John Ratzenberger, Don Rickles, Wallace Shawn, and Jim Varney. Set in a world in which toys come to life, Toy Story follows an old-fashioned cowboy doll named Woody (Hanks), who becomes jealous that a space cadet action figure, Buzz Lightyear (Allen), is replacing him as the favorite toy of their owner Andy.

Following the success of the 1988 short film Tin Toy, Pixar was approached by Disney to produce a computer-animated feature film that was told from a small toy's perspective. Lasseter, Stanton, and Pete Docter wrote early story treatments, which were rejected by Disney, who wanted the film's tone to be edgier. After several disastrous story reels, production was halted, and the script was rewritten to better reflect the tone and theme Pixar desired: "toys deeply want children to play with them, and ... this desire drives their hopes, fears, and actions". The studio, then consisting of a relatively small number of employees, produced Toy Story under minor financial constraints.

Toy Story premiered at the El Capitan Theatre in Los Angeles on November 19, 1995, and was released theatrically in the United States on November 22. It set a record for the highest-grossing opening weekend and eventually grossed over $363 million worldwide, making it the second highest-grossing film of 1995. The film received widespread acclaim, with praise directed towards the animation, screenplay, Randy Newman's score, appeal to all age groups, and voice performances, particularly of Hanks and Allen. It holds a 100% approval rating on film aggregation website Rotten Tomatoes.

The film is frequently lauded as one of the greatest animated films ever made, and, due to its status as the first computer-animated film, one of the most important films in the medium's history and in film at large. The film received three Academy Award nominations—Best Original Screenplay (the first animated film to be nominated for the award), Best Original Song for "You've Got a Friend in Me", and Best Original Score—in addition to being honored with a non-competitive Special Achievement Academy Award.

In 2005, Toy Story was selected for preservation in the United States National Film Registry by the Library of Congress as being "culturally, historically, or aesthetically significant". The success of Toy Story launched a multimedia franchise, with four sequels beginning with Toy Story 2 (1999); a spin-off film, Lightyear (2022); and numerous short films. Toy Story has had several theatrical re-releases, including a 3D re-release in 2009 as part of a double feature with Toy Story 2, and a 30th anniversary re-release in 2025.

== Plot ==
In a world where toys are sentient but pretend to be lifeless around humans, a group of toys, led by Sheriff Woody, are preparing to move to a new house with their young owner, Andy Davis, and his family. During the party for Andy's sixth birthday, the toys become concerned that Andy might receive a new toy that will replace them. Andy receives a Buzz Lightyear action figure, who believes that he is an actual Space Ranger and does not know that he is a toy. Buzz impresses the others with his electronic features and becomes Andy's new favorite toy, much to Woody's jealousy.

Two days before the move, Andy's family plans to have dinner at Pizza Planet, and Andy is allowed to bring one toy along. To ensure Andy brings him instead of Buzz, Woody attempts to trap Buzz behind Andy's desk, but accidentally knocks him out the window instead. Believing Woody pushed Buzz on purpose, the other toys rebel against Woody until Andy takes him into the car, with Buzz following. When the car stops at a gas station, Buzz furiously confronts Woody. The two fight, fall out of the car, and are left behind, but then manage to hitch a ride on a Pizza Planet delivery truck. At Pizza Planet, Buzz mistakes a claw machine for a rocket and climbs in, pursued by Woody. Sid Phillips, Andy's sadistic next-door neighbor, grabs Woody and Buzz with the claw and takes them to his house, where they encounter his mutant toys, made from parts of toys Sid has destroyed.

After evading Sid's dog Scud, Buzz sees a television commercial promoting Buzz Lightyear toys and suffers an existential crisis, finally realizing that he is a toy. He attempts to fly, but falls and breaks his arm off. After Sid's toys repair Buzz, Sid tapes him to a firework rocket, planning to blow him up the following day. Overnight, Woody helps Buzz realize that his purpose is to make Andy happy, reinvigorating him. The next morning, as Sid prepares to launch Buzz's rocket, Woody rallies the mutant toys to help him, and together, they come to life and frighten Sid, telling him to play nice with his toys from now on.

After Sid flees, Woody and Buzz pursue the Davises' moving truck, but Scud, who had been locked out of the house from the mutant toys' efforts, attacks Woody. Buzz jumps off the truck and fights Scud off, while Woody climbs up and pushes RC out to rescue Buzz. The other toys think Woody is harming RC and promptly throw him out of the truck. Woody and Buzz race after the truck on RC, but his batteries run out. Woody ignites the rocket strapped to Buzz, and Buzz opens his wings to sever the tape just before the rocket explodes. Woody and Buzz glide through the sunroof of the Davises' car, landing safely inside. On Christmas in the new house, the toys happily listen to Andy opening his presents, no longer concerned over new toys replacing them. When Andy receives a puppy however, Woody and Buzz nervously smile at each other.

== Voice cast ==
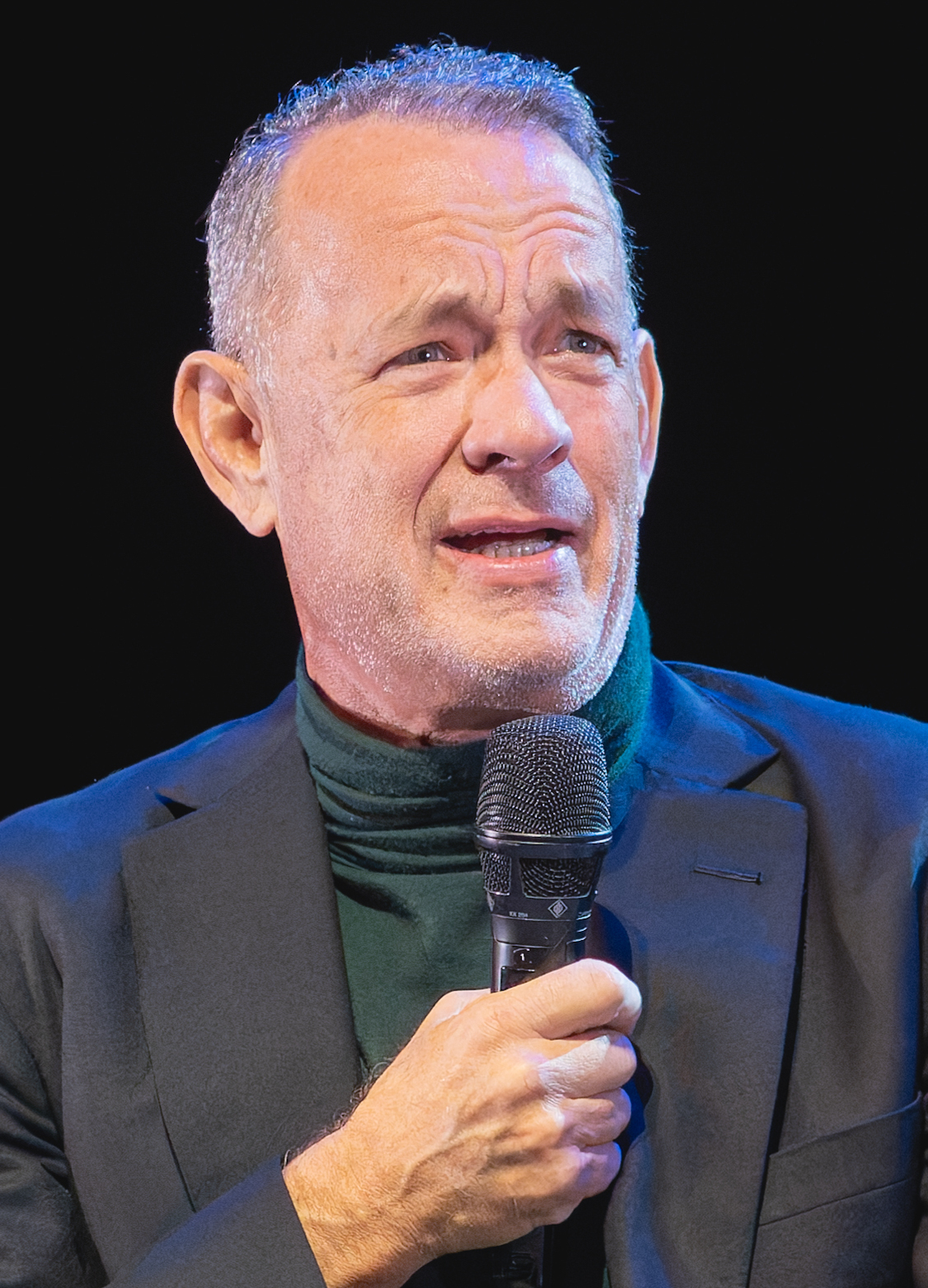
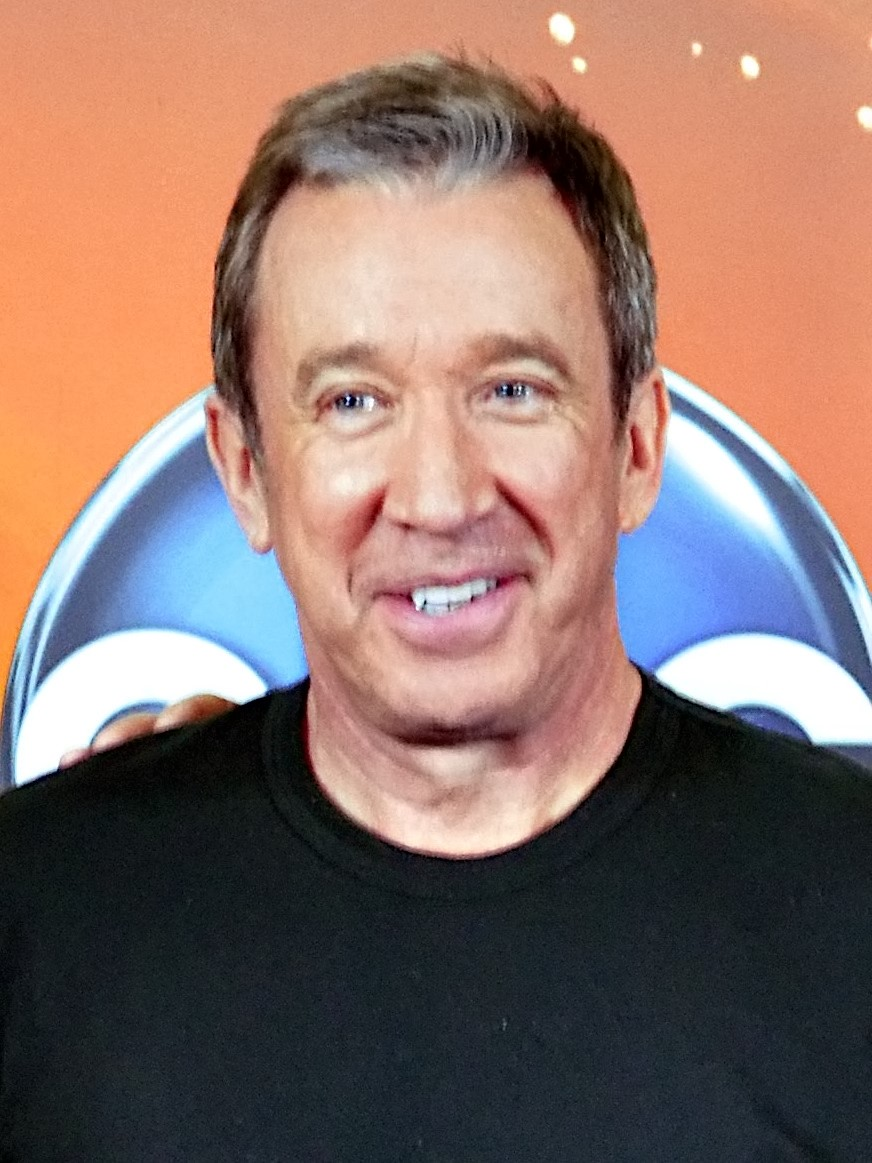
Tom Hanks (left, pictured in 2023) and Tim Allen (2012)
- Tom Hanks as Woody, a cowboy doll and Andy's favorite toy
- Tim Allen as Buzz Lightyear, a Space Ranger action figure
- Don Rickles as Mr. Potato Head, a cynical Mr. Potato Head toy
- Jim Varney as Slinky Dog, a dachshund slinky toy
- Wallace Shawn as Rex, a nervous Tyrannosaurus figurine
- John Ratzenberger as Hamm, a smart-talking piggy bank
- Annie Potts as Bo Peep, a porcelain shepherdess doll
- John Morris as Andy Davis, the six-year-old boy who owns all the toys
- Erik von Detten as Sid Phillips, Andy's mischievous next-door neighbor who destroys toys for fun
- Laurie Metcalf as Mrs. Davis, Andy's mother
- R. Lee Ermey as Sergeant, the leader of a troop of green plastic army men
- Sarah Freeman as Hannah Phillips, Sid's younger sister
- Penn Jillette as the Buzz Lightyear commercial announcer
- Joe Ranft as Lenny, a toy pair of binoculars
- Jeff Pidgeon as the Aliens, a group of green squeeze-toy aliens

== Production ==
=== Development ===
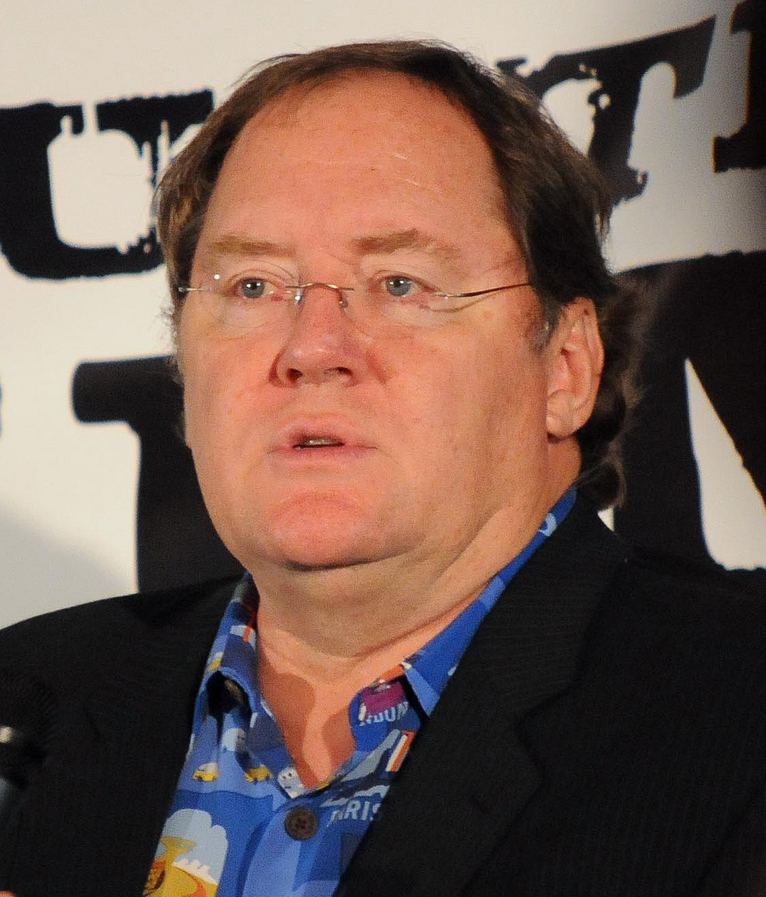
John Lasseter (pictured in 2011) co-wrote and directed Toy Story

John Lasseter's first experience with computer animation was during his work as an animator at Walt Disney Feature Animation, when two of his friends showed him the light-cycle scene from Tron. It was an eye-opening experience that awakened Lasseter to the possibilities offered by the new medium of computer-generated animation. Lasseter tried to pitch The Brave Little Toaster as a fully computer-animated film to Disney, but the idea was rejected and Lasseter was fired. He then went on to work at Lucasfilm and in 1986, he became a founding member of Pixar. In 1986, Pixar was purchased by entrepreneur and Apple Inc. co-founder Steve Jobs. At Pixar, Lasseter created short, computer-animated films to show off the Pixar Image Computer's capabilities. In 1988, Lasseter produced the short film Tin Toy, which was told from the perspective of a toy, referencing Lasseter's love of classic toys. Tin Toy won the 1989 Academy Award for Best Animated Short Film, the first computer-generated film to do so.

Tin Toy gained Disney's attention, and the new team at The Walt Disney Company, CEO Michael Eisner and chairman Jeffrey Katzenberg in the film division, sought to get Lasseter to come back. Lasseter, grateful for Jobs' faith in him, felt compelled to stay with Pixar, telling co-founder Ed Catmull, "I can go to Disney and be a director, or I can stay here and make history." Katzenberg realized he could not lure Lasseter back to Disney and therefore set plans into motion to ink a production deal with Pixar to produce a film. Disney had always made all their movies in-house and refused to change this. But when Tim Burton, who used to work at Disney, wanted to buy back the rights to The Nightmare Before Christmas, Disney struck a deal allowing him to make it as a Disney film outside the studio. This allowed Pixar to make their movies outside Disney.

Both sides were willing. Catmull and fellow Pixar co-founder Alvy Ray Smith had long wanted to produce a computer-animated feature, but only by the early 1990s were the computers cheap and powerful enough to make this possible. In addition, Disney had licensed Pixar's Computer Animation Production System (CAPS), and that made it the largest customer for Pixar's computers. Jobs made it apparent to Katzenberg that although Disney was happy with Pixar, it was not the other way around: "We want to do a film with you," said Jobs. "That would make us happy."

Catmull, Smith, and head of animation Ralph Guggenheim met with Walt Disney Feature Animation president Peter Schneider in the summer of 1990 to discuss making a feature film, but they found the atmosphere to be puzzling and contentious. They later learned that while Katzenberg was pushing the idea of working with Pixar, Schneider did not want to bring in a non-Disney animation studio. Katzenberg arranged to meet directly with the Pixar contingent, this time including Lasseter and Jobs. The Pixar team proposed three separate ideas for their first major project, including an original idea entitled Bob the Dinosaur, an adaptation of James and the Giant Peach, and a Christmas television special entitled, A Tin Toy Christmas. Disney greenlit the third idea, but Katzenberg countered that as long as they were gearing up to transition from 30-second commercials to a half-hour special, they might as well go all the way and make a feature-length film.

Katzenberg also made it clear that he was only working with Pixar to get access to Lasseter's talents, and that the Pixar team would be signing up to work with a self-described "tyrant" and micro-manager. However, he invited them to talk with Disney's animators and get their opinions on working under him and Lasseter was impressed with what he heard. The two companies began negotiations, although they disagreed on key points including whether Disney would get the rights to Pixar's animation technology or whether Pixar would retain partial ownership of the films, characters, and home video and sequel rights. As Pixar was nearing bankruptcy and desperate for funds, they settled on a deal that would allow Disney to have complete ownership and control of the films and characters, including the rights to make sequels without Pixar's involvement, while Pixar would get approximately 12.5% of ticket sales. These early negotiations became a point of contention between Jobs and Eisner for many years.

An agreement to produce a feature film based on Tin Toy with a working title of Toy Story was finalized, and production began soon thereafter.

=== Writing ===
Originally, Toy Story was going to feature "Tinny", the wind-up one-man band toy from the Tin Toy short film, along with "the dummy", a ventriloquist's dummy. While the premise remained the toys' desire to be played with, the script differed significantly, involving Tinny's adventures—from being left at a gas station to finding a new home in a kindergarten. Katzenberg was unhappy with the treatment drafted by Lasseter, Andrew Stanton, and Pete Docter, as the two character's motivations were too similar. Instead, he encouraged them to write it as a buddy film, giving the two main characters contrasting personalities, and having them only become friends after being forced to work together. Lasseter, Stanton, and Docter delivered a revised treatment in September 1991 that more closely resembles the final version of the film: Tinny replaces the ventriloquist dummy as a child's favorite toy, their bickering causes them to be left behind at a gas station, they almost catch up to the family at a pizza restaurant, they have to escape a kid that mutilates toys, and the movie ends with a chase scene as the two toys try to catch up to the family's moving van.

The script went through many changes before the final version of it. Lasseter decided Tinny was "too antiquated"; the character was first changed to a military action figure in the likes of G.I. Joe and was then given a space theme. Tinny's name changed to Lunar Larry, then Tempus from Morph, and eventually Buzz Lightyear (after astronaut Buzz Aldrin). Lightyear's design was modeled on the suits worn by Apollo astronauts as well as the aforementioned G.I. Joe action figures. Also, the green and purple color scheme on Lightyear's suit was inspired by Lasseter and his wife, Nancy, whose favorite colors are green and purple, respectively. Woody was inspired by a Casper the Friendly Ghost doll that Lasseter had when he was a child; he was a ventriloquist's dummy with a pull-string (hence the name "Woody"). This was until character designer Bud Luckey suggested that Woody could be changed to a cowboy ventriloquist dummy. Lasseter liked the contrast between the Western and the science fiction genres and the character immediately changed. Eventually, all of the ventriloquist dummy aspects of the character were deleted as the dummy looked "sneaky and mean". However, they kept the name "Woody" to pay homage to the Western actor Woody Strode. The story department drew inspiration from films such as Midnight Run and The Odd Couple.

Since Toy Story's script writers had little experience with feature films, they attended a seminar given by screenwriter Robert McKee. They were inspired by his guidance, based on Aristotle's Poetics, that the main character in a story should be defined by how they react to the obstacles they face, and that it is those obstacles that make characters interesting. Disney also appointed the duo Joel Cohen and Alec Sokolow and, later, Joss Whedon to help develop the script. Whedon thought that while the script did not work, it had "a great structure". He added the character of Rex and sought a pivotal role for a Barbie doll; the latter transformed into Bo Peep as Mattel would not license the character. Whedon also re-visioned Buzz Lightyear from being a dim-witted but cheerful and self-aware character to an action figure who is not aware that he is a toy—an epiphany that transformed the film. A brainstorming session with members of Disney Animation's creative team resulted in the addition of the three-eyed squeaky toy aliens.

Toy Story was the first animated film for which scratch vocals were recorded first for all reels, to be later replaced by production sound. Before that point, animation studios were more disorganized as to when scratch vocals or production sound were recorded for any particular reel. For example, during the 1980s, Disney Animation experimented with recording production sound for all reels (without recording scratch vocals first) before starting animation.

=== Casting ===
Katzenberg approved the script on January 19, 1993, at which point voice casting began. Paul Newman, who would later accept the role of Doc Hudson in Cars (2006), was considered for the role of Woody. Robin Williams and Clint Eastwood were also considered for Woody, but Lasseter always wanted Tom Hanks to play the role. Lasseter claimed that Hanks "has the ability to take emotions and make them appealing. Even if the character, like the one in A League of Their Own, is down-and-out and despicable." To gauge how an actor's voice might fit with a character, Lasseter borrowed a common Disney technique: animate a vocal monologue from a well-established actor to meld the actor's voice with the appearance or actions of the animated character. This early test footage, using Hanks' voice from Turner & Hooch, convinced Hanks to sign on to the film.

Billy Crystal was approached to play Buzz, and was given his own monologue, utilizing dialogue from When Harry Met Sally... However, Crystal turned the role down, being of the opinion that he was the wrong voice for the character, but later said that the decision was the biggest regret of his acting career. He subsequently accepted the role of Mike Wazowski in Monsters, Inc. (2001). In addition to Crystal, Bill Murray, Chevy Chase and Jim Carrey, along with a number of other actors, including Jason Alexander, Dan Aykroyd, Matthew Broderick, Kevin Costner, Michael J. Fox, Richard Gere, David Hasselhoff, Michael Keaton, Wayne Knight, Bill Paxton, Dennis Quaid, Kurt Russell, Adam Sandler, John Travolta, and Dana Carvey were also considered for the role of Buzz. (Note: Attributed to multiple references:) Lasseter took the role to Tim Allen, who was appearing in Disney's Home Improvement, and he accepted. Crystal later stated in an interview that he would not have been right as Buzz, and that Allen was "fantastic" in the role. Before Wallace Shawn and Jim Varney were cast as Rex and Slinky Dog, Rick Moranis and John Cleese were originally considered for the roles.

To cast Andy, Pixar held an open call for young male actors to bring a toy with them. John Morris (who voices Andy in the film) brought multiple toys, specifically 45 X-Men figures, contrary to the instructions of bringing just one, and Pixar reacted to his dumping of the toys with laughter.

=== Production shutdown ===
Every couple of weeks, Lasseter and his team showed Disney their latest storyboards or footage. Disney was impressed by Pixar's technical innovation, but less so of the plot. Katzenberg discarded most of Pixar's script ideas, giving his own extensive notes. Katzenberg primarily wanted to add "more edginess" to the two main characters, as Disney wanted Toy Story to appeal to both children and adults, and they asked for adult references to be added to the film. The characters ended up being stripped of their charm, with Hanks, while recording Woody's dialogue for the story reels, pointing out that the Woody character had been made into a "real jerk". Pixar screened the first half of the film for Disney executives on November 19, 1993—an event they later dubbed the "Black Friday Incident". The results were disastrous, and Disney's head of feature animation, Peter Schneider, halted production. Katzenberg asked colleague Thomas Schumacher why the reels were bad, to which Schumacher answered, "Because it's not their movie anymore; it's completely not the movie that John set out to make."

Lasseter was embarrassed by the current state of the film, later recalling, "It was a story filled with the most unhappy, mean characters that I've ever seen." Katzenberg allowed him to take the script back to Pixar for rewrites, and the production crew shifted to television commercials while the head writers worked out a new script, being funded personally by Jobs until Disney resumed production. Although Lasseter attempted to keep morale high by remaining outwardly buoyant, the production shutdown was "a very scary time" according to story department manager BZ Petroff. Schneider appealed directly to Eisner to cancel the project altogether. Stanton and the other story artists worked to quickly produce new script pages, with help from consultants such as Whedon, and the first revisions were completed in two weeks as promised.

Pixar's script rewrites took three months, and saw Woody transformed from a tyrant to a wise leader. It also included a more adult-oriented staff meeting amongst the toys rather than the juvenile group discussion that had existed in earlier drafts. Buzz Lightyear's character was also changed "to make it more clear to the audience that he genuinely doesn't know he's a toy". Katzenberg and Schneider resumed production with the new script by February 1994, and the voice actors returned one month later to record their new lines. The crew grew from 24 people to 110, and now included 27 animators and 22 technical directors. In comparison, The Lion King (1994) required a staff of 800. In the early budgeting process, Jobs was eager to produce the film as efficiently as possible, impressing Katzenberg with his focus on cost-cutting. However, the $17 million production budget was no longer going to be sufficient, and Jobs requested more funds from Disney to compensate them for the time lost in rewrites based on Katzenberg's notes. Catmull was able to reach a compromise on a new budget, but the incident led Jobs to rethink their deal with Disney.

=== Animation ===
Recruiting animators for Toy Story was brisk; the magnet for talent was not the pay, which was mediocre, but the allure of taking part in the first computer-animated feature. Lasseter said of the challenges of computer animation, "We had to make things look more organic. Every leaf and blade of grass had to be created. We had to give the world a sense of history. So the doors are banged up, the floors have scuffs." Tom Schumacher, Vice President of Walt Disney Feature Animation, felt the film's story could not have been told with traditional two-dimensional animation. The film began with animated storyboards to guide the animators in developing the characters. 27 animators worked on the film, using 400 computer models to animate the characters. Each character was first either created out of clay or modeled from a computer-drawn diagram before reaching the computer-animated design.

Once the animators had a model, its articulation and motion controls were coded; this allowed each character to move in a variety of ways, such as talking, walking, or jumping. Out of all of the characters, Woody was the most complex, as he required 723 motion controls, including 212 for his face and 58 for his mouth. The first piece of animation, a 30-second test, was delivered to Disney in June 1992, when the company requested a sample of what the film would look like. Lasseter wanted to impress Disney with several things in the test that could not be done in traditional, hand-drawn animation, such as Woody's yellow plaid shirt with red stripes, the reflections in Buzz's helmet and the decals on his spacesuit, or Venetian blind shadows falling across Andy's room.

There were eight teams that were responsible for different aspects of all of the shots. The art department was responsible for determining the overall color and lighting scheme. The layout department was responsible for determining the position of all elements of the shot, as well as programming the virtual camera's position and movements. The animation department created the movements of the characters, generally with one animator being assigned to animate an entire shot, but occasionally with each character having its own animator. The shading team used Pixar's RenderMan software to assign surface textures and reflectivity properties to objects. The lighting team placed global, spot, and flood lighting within the scenes. The "Render Farm" used Sun Microsystems computers, running around the clock, to produce the final frames of the film. The camera team recorded the finished frames, which had been rendered at a resolution of 1536 by 922, onto film stock. Finally, Skywalker Sound mixed sound effects, the musical score, and the dialogue to create the audio for the film.

In order to make the film feel as realistic as possible, the layout department, led by Craig Good, avoided the sweeping camera shots popular in computer animation at the time, and instead focused on emulating what would have been possible had the film been shot in live-action with real film cameras. The animation department, led by Rich Quade and Ash Brannon, used Pixar's Menv software to hand pose the characters at key frames based on videotape of the actors recording their lines, and let the software do the inbetweening. To sync the characters' mouths and facial expressions to the actors' recorded voices, animators spent a week per eight seconds of animation, as Lasseter felt that automatic lip syncing would not properly convey a character's emotions. The shading team, led by Tom Porter, used scans of real objects, as well as textures drawn by artists and created with procedural generation algorithms, to "dress" the objects in the film.

The film required 800,000 machine hours and 114,240 frames of animation in total, divided between 1,561 shots that totaled over 77 minutes. Pixar was able to render less than 30 seconds of the film per day.

=== Music ===
Lasseter did not want to make Toy Story into a musical, as he felt that it would make the film feel less genuine. Whedon later agreed, saying "It would have been a really bad musical because it's a buddy movie. It's about people who won't admit what they want, much less sing about it. [...] Buddy movies are about sublimating, punching an arm, 'I hate you.' It's not about open emotion." However, Disney preferred to make it a musical, as they had had much success with incorporating Broadway-style musical numbers into their animated films, and encouraged Pixar to do the same. As a compromise, although the characters would not sing, the movie would feature non-diegetic songs as background music. Despite this not happening, the first musical number is seen at the end of Toy Story 2 (1999), and Toy Story: The Musical (2012) is the first version of the original to actually feature the cast of characters singing.

Randy Newman composed three original songs for the film. The film's signature song "You've Got a Friend in Me", was written in one day. The song "Hakuna Matata" from The Lion King is heard briefly during the climax when Woody and Buzz are trying to get into the truck while riding RC. On Newman, Lasseter said, "His songs are touching, witty, and satirical, and he would deliver the emotional underpinning for every scene." The soundtrack for Toy Story was produced by Walt Disney Records and was released on November 22, 1995, the week of the film's release.

=== Editing and pre-release ===
The film's editors, including Lee Unkrich, worked on Toy Story up until the September 1995 deadline to deliver a final cut for scoring and sound design. According to Unkrich, a scene removed from the original final edit featured Sid torturing Buzz and Woody violently at his house before the scene where Sid interrogates Woody with a magnifying glass. The torture scene was removed because the crew felt that the audience would be so invested in Buzz and Woody's characters by that point that they would be uncomfortable watching them being subjected to such violence. Another scene, in which Woody tries to get Buzz's attention when he was stuck in the box crate while insincerely apologizing for accidentally getting him knocked out of the window, was shortened because the creators felt it would lose the energy of the film. A test screening in July 1995 received encouraging responses from the audience, but the film was not rated as highly as had been hoped, leading to another last-minute round of edits. Eisner, who attended the screening, suggested that the final shot of the film should be of both Woody and Buzz, leading to the film's final shot of the two worried about the arrival of Andy's new puppy.

The crew had difficulty analysing the film's quality due to footage being in scattered pieces. Some animators felt the film would be a significant disappointment commercially but felt animators and animation fans would find it interesting. Schneider had grown optimistic about the film as it neared completion, and he announced a United States release date of November, coinciding with Thanksgiving weekend and the start of the winter holiday season.

Sources indicate that Jobs lacked confidence in the film during its production, and had been exploring the possibility of selling Pixar to companies such as Hallmark Cards and Microsoft. However, as the film progressed, Jobs, like Schneider, became increasingly passionate about the film and the transformative nature of what Pixar might be able to accomplish. Eager for Pixar to have the funds necessary to negotiate with Disney as an equal partner, and optimistic about the impact the finished film would have, Jobs decided that he would schedule an initial public offering (IPO) of Pixar just a week after the film's November release.

== Release ==
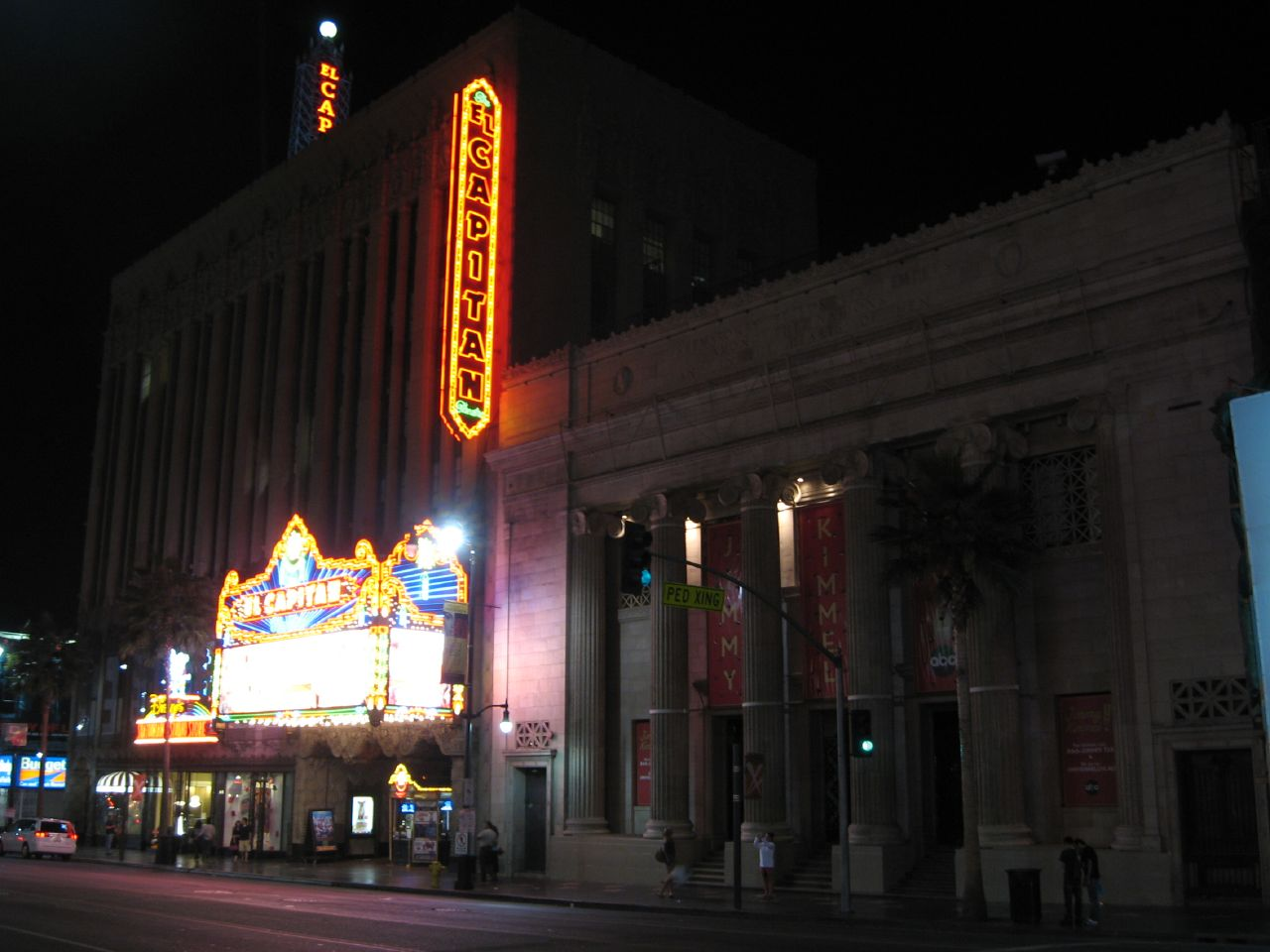
The El Capitan Theatre in Los Angeles, where Toy Story's premiere took place on November 19, 1995

Both Disney and Pixar held separate premieres for Toy Story, with Disney holding theirs at their flagship El Capitan Theatre in Los Angeles on November 19, 1995, and Pixar holding theirs the following night at the Regency Center in San Francisco. According to David Price's 2008 book The Pixar Touch, the film deeply resonated with audiences, with even the adults being noticeably moved by the film.

In some international territories, the theatrical release of the film was preceded by a re-release of the Roger Rabbit short Roller Coaster Rabbit.

In addition to showing at the El Capitan, where tickets included admission to the Totally Toy Story funhouse that Disney had built in the Hollywood Masonic Temple next door, the film opened on 2,281 screens on the 22nd and later expanded to 2,574.

The film was also shown at the Berlin International Film Festival out of competition from February 15 to 26, 1996. Elsewhere, the film opened in March 1996.

=== Marketing ===
Marketing for Toy Story included $20 million spent by Disney for advertising as well as advertisers such as Burger King, PepsiCo, Coca-Cola, and Payless ShoeSource paying $125 million in promotions for the film. Marketing consultant Al Ries reflected on the promotion: "This will be a killer deal. How can a kid, sitting through a one-and-a-half-hour movie with an army of recognizable toy characters, not want to own one?" Despite this, Disney Consumer Products was slow to see the potential of Toy Story. When the Thanksgiving release date was announced in January 1995, many toy companies were accustomed to having eighteen months to two years of lead time and passed on the project. Disney shopped the film at the Toy Fair trade show in February 1995, where only the small Canadian company Thinkway Toys, was interested in licensing the toy rights for the Toy Story characters. Disney promoted the film by inserting its trailer into the home-video re-release of Cinderella, showing a behind-the-scenes documentary on the Disney Channel, and incorporating the characters into a parade at the Disney-MGM Studios theme park in Florida.

It was screenwriter Joss Whedon's idea to incorporate Barbie as a character who could rescue Woody and Buzz in Toy Story's final act. The idea was dropped after Mattel objected and refused to license the toy. Producer Ralph Guggenheim claimed that Mattel did not allow the use of the toy as "They [Mattel] philosophically felt girls who play with Barbie dolls are projecting their personalities onto the doll. If you give the doll a voice and animate it, you're creating a persona for it that might not be every little girl's dream and desire." Hasbro likewise refused to license G.I. Joe (mainly because Sid was going to blow one up, prompting the filmmakers to instead use a fictional toy, Combat Carl), but they did license Mr. Potato Head. The only real-life toy in the film that was not in production was Slinky Dog, which had been discontinued since the 1970s. When designs for Slinky were sent to Betty James (Slinky inventor Richard James's wife) she said that Pixar had improved the toy and that it was "cuter" than the original.

=== Re-releases ===
==== 3-D conversion ====
On October 2, 2009, Toy Story was re-released in Disney Digital 3-D. The film was also released with Toy Story 2 as a double feature for a two-week run which was extended due to its success. In addition, the film's second sequel, Toy Story 3, was also released in the 3-D format. Lasseter commented on the new 3-D re-release:

The Toy Story films and characters will always hold a very special place in our hearts and we're so excited to be bringing this landmark film back for audiences to enjoy in a whole new way thanks to the latest in 3-D technology. With Toy Story 3 shaping up to be another great adventure for Buzz, Woody, and the gang from Andy's room, we thought it would be great to let audiences experience the first two films all over again and in a brand new way.

Translating the film into 3-D involved revisiting the original computer data and virtually placing a second camera into each scene, creating left eye and right eye views needed to achieve the perception of depth. Unique to computer animation, Lasseter referred to this process as "digital archaeology". The process took four months, as well as an additional six months for the two films to add the 3-D. The lead stereographer Bob Whitehill oversaw this process and sought to achieve an effect that affected the emotional storytelling of the film:

When I would look at the films as a whole, I would search for story reasons to use 3-D in different ways. In Toy Story, for instance, when the toys were alone in their world, I wanted it to feel consistent with a safer world. And when they went out to the human world, that's when I really blew out the 3-D to make it feel dangerous and deep and overwhelming.

Unlike other countries, the United Kingdom received the films in 3-D as separate releases. Toy Story was released on October 2, 2009. Toy Story 2 was instead released January 22, 2010. The re-release performed well at the box office, opening with $12,500,000 in its opening weekend, placing at the third position after Zombieland and Cloudy with a Chance of Meatballs. The double feature grossed $30.7 million in its five-week release.

==== Disney100 ====
As part of Disney's 100th anniversary, Toy Story was re-released in selected CINEMARK theaters from July 21 to August 3, 2023. It was also re-released in the United Kingdom from September 29 to October 5, and in Latin American theaters from October 12 to 18 alongside Cinderella (1950).

==== 30th anniversary ====
Toy Story was re-released in the United States on September 12, 2025, to coincide with the film's 30th anniversary and kickstart the promotional rollout for Toy Story 5 (2026). During its opening weekend, the film earned $3.4 million, ranking fifth at the domestic box office.

=== Home media ===
Toy Story was released by Walt Disney Home Video on VHS and LaserDisc in the United States and Canada on October 29, 1996, with no bonus material. That year on December 18, deluxe edition widescreen LaserDisc 4-disc box set debuted. This THX-certified LaserDisc release features bonus material, including the history and development of characters, storyboards and story reels, abandoned concepts and characters, audio commentary, outtakes, deleted animation, and trailers. Within the first few weeks of the VHS release, rentals and sales totaled $5.1 million, ranking Toy Story as the No. 1 video, beating out Twister. Over 21.5 million VHS copies were sold during the first year. Toy Story was the second-highest-selling home video release of 1996, behind Independence Day. On January 11, 2000, the film was re-released on VHS, but this time as the first video to be part of the Walt Disney Gold Classic Collection with the bonus short film Tin Toy. This release sold two million copies.

Toy Story was released for the first time on DVD on October 17, 2000, in a two-pack with its first sequel Toy Story 2. The same day, a 3-disc "Ultimate Toy Box" set was released, featuring Toy Story, Toy Story 2, and the third disc of bonus materials. Both DVD versions have the Tin Toy short film, as well as the THX certification. The twin-pack release was later released individually on March 20, 2001. The DVD two-pack, the Ultimate Toy Box set, the Gold Classic Collection VHS and DVD, and the original DVD were all put in the Disney Vault on May 1, 2003. On September 6, 2005, a 2-disc "10th Anniversary Edition" was released featuring much of the bonus material from the "Ultimate Toy Box", including a retrospective special with John Lasseter and a brand new DTS sound mix. This DVD went back in the Disney Vault on January 31, 2009, along with Toy Story 2. The 10th Anniversary release was the last version of Toy Story to be released before being taken out of the Disney Vault lineup along with Toy Story 2. A UMD of Toy Story was released for the Sony PlayStation Portable on September 6, 2005.

Toy Story was available for the first time on Blu-ray in a Special Edition Combo Pack that included two discs, the Blu-ray, and the DVD versions of the film. This combo-edition was released by Walt Disney Studios Home Entertainment on March 23, 2010, along with its sequel. There was a DVD-only re-release on May 11, 2010. Another "Ultimate Toy Box", packaging the Combo Pack with those of both sequels, became available on November 2, 2010. On November 1, 2011, the first three Toy Story films were re-released all together, each as a DVD/Blu-ray/Blu-ray 3D/Digital Copy combo pack (four discs each for the first two films, and five for the third film). They were also released on Blu-ray 3D in a complete trilogy box set. The film had a re-release on 4K Ultra HD Blu-ray on June 4, 2019.

== Reception ==
=== Box office ===
Executive producer Steve Jobs said Toy Story would need to gross $75 million for both Pixar and Disney to break even. Toy Story eventually grossed more than $350 million worldwide. The film's success surpassed the expectations of Disney chairman Michael Eisner.

Toy Story earned $29.1 million during its three-day opening weekend and $39.1 million in its first five days of domestic release. It also generated a combined total of $158.6 million from ticket sales over the five-day weekend, leading the most successful long weekend in box office history until Independence Day in July 1996. The film placed first in the weekend's box office, overtaking GoldenEye, Ace Ventura: When Nature Calls, Money Train, and Casino, and maintaining the number-one position at the domestic box office for the next two weekends. It was displaced by Jumanji in its fourth weekend, but still managed to outgross newcomers Heat and Sabrina with $10.9 million. Toy Story returned to the top of the box office in its sixth weekend, edging out Waiting to Exhale and collecting $19.3 million. In its seventh weekend, the film fell into fourth place behind 12 Monkeys, Grumpier Old Men, and Jumanji, although it made $7 million.

Toy Story went on to become the highest-grossing domestic film of 1995, beating Batman Forever, Apollo 13 (also starring Tom Hanks), Pocahontas, Casper, Waterworld, GoldenEye, and other films. At the time of its release, it was the third-highest-grossing animated film of all time, after The Lion King (1994) and Aladdin (1992). Toy Story became the second-highest-grossing film of 1995, just $3 million behind Die Hard with a Vengeance. When not considering inflation, Toy Story is number 96 on the list of the highest-grossing domestic films of all time.

As of September 21, 2025, Toy Story has grossed $198.4 million in the U.S. and Canada and $176.2 million in international markets from its original 1995 release and subsequent re-releases for a total of $374.6 million worldwide. At the time of its release, the film ranked as the 17th-highest-grossing film (unadjusted) domestically and the 21st-highest-grossing film worldwide.

=== Critical response ===
Toy Story received universal acclaim upon release. The film earned a rare approval rating of 100% based on 163 professional reviews on the review aggregator website Rotten Tomatoes, with an average rating of 9.4/10. Its critical consensus reads, "Entertaining as it is innovative, Toy Story reinvigorated animation while heralding the arrival of Pixar as a family-friendly force to be reckoned with." Metacritic (which uses a weighted average) assigned Toy Story a score of 96 out of 100 based on 26 critics, indicating "universal acclaim". Audiences polled by CinemaScore gave the film an average grade of "A" on an A+ to F scale.

Particular praise was offered for the film's 3D animation. Leonard Klady of Variety commended its "razzle-dazzle technique and unusual look" and said that "the camera loops and zooms in a dizzying fashion that fairly takes one's breath away." Roger Ebert of the Chicago Sun-Times compared the animation to Disney's Who Framed Roger Rabbit, saying that "both movies take apart the universe of cinematic visuals and put it back together again, allowing us to see in a new way." Due to the film's creative animation, Richard Corliss of Time magazine claimed that it was "the year's most inventive comedy".

The voice cast was also praised by various critics. Susan Wloszczyna of USA Today approved of the selection of Tom Hanks and Tim Allen for the lead roles. Kenneth Turan of the Los Angeles Times stated that "Starting with Tom Hanks, who brings an invaluable heft and believability to Woody, Toy Story is one of the best voiced animated features in memory, with all the actors ... making their presences strongly felt."

Several critics also recognized the film's ability to appeal to various age groups. Owen Gleiberman of Entertainment Weekly wrote "It has the purity, the ecstatic freedom of imagination, that's the hallmark of the greatest children's films. It also has the kind of spring-loaded allusive prankishness that, at times, will tickle adults even more than it does kids."

In 1995, Toy Story was ranked eighth in TIME's list of the "Best 10 films of 1995". In 2011, TIME named it one of the "25 All-TIME Best Animated Films". It also ranks at number 99 in Empire magazine's list of the "500 Greatest Films of All Time" and as the "highest-ranked animated movie".

In 2003, the Online Film Critics Society ranked the film as the greatest animated film of all time. In 2007, the Visual Effects Society named the film 22nd in its list of the "Top 50 Most Influential Visual Effects Films of All Time". The film is ranked 99th on the AFI's list of the "100 greatest American Films of All-Time". It was one of the only two animated films on that list, the other being Snow White and the Seven Dwarfs (1937). It was also the sixth best in the animation genre on AFI's 10 Top 10.

In more recent years, director Terry Gilliam has praised the film as "a work of genius. It got people to understand what toys are about. They're true to their own character. And that's just brilliant. It's got a shot that's always stuck with me when Buzz Lightyear discovers he's a toy. He's sitting on this landing at the top of the staircase and the camera pulls back and he's this tiny little figure. He was this guy with a massive ego two seconds before... and it's stunning. I'd put that as one of my top ten films, period."

=== Accolades ===
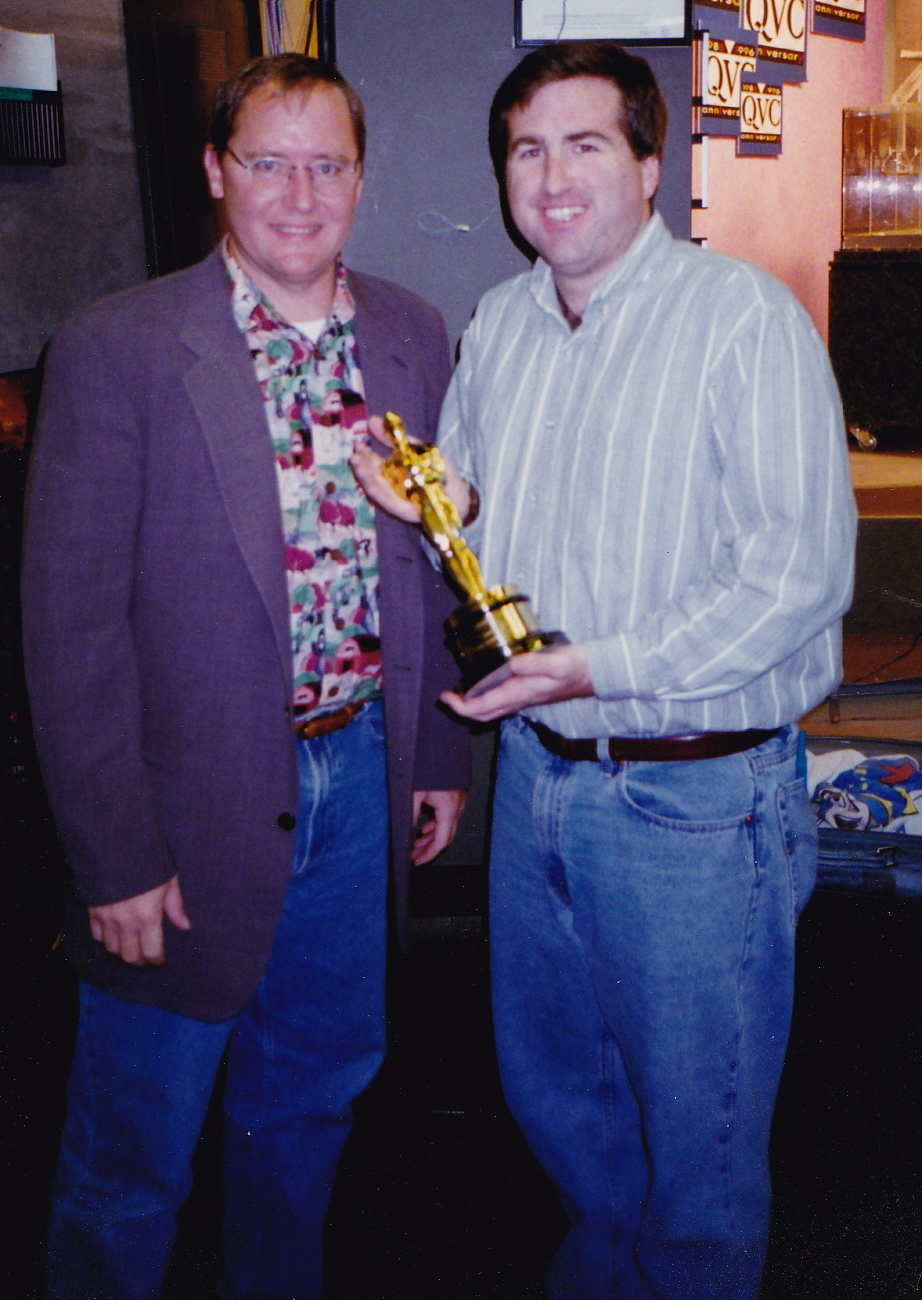
Lasseter with the Special Achievement Oscar

The film won and was nominated for various other awards including a Kids' Choice Award, MTV Movie Award, and a British Academy Film Award, among others. John Lasseter received a Special Achievement Academy Award in 1996 "for the development and inspired application of techniques that have made possible the first feature-length computer-animated film". Additionally, the film was nominated for three Academy Awards, two to Randy Newman for Best Music—Original Song, for "You've Got a Friend in Me", and Best Music—Original Musical or Comedy Score. It was also nominated for Best Original Screenplay for the work by Joel Cohen, Pete Docter, John Lasseter, Joe Ranft, Alec Sokolow, Andrew Stanton and Joss Whedon, making it the first animated film to be nominated for an Academy Award writing category.

Toy Story won eight Annie Awards, including Best Animated Feature. Animator Pete Docter, director John Lasseter, musician Randy Newman, producers Bonnie Arnold and Ralph Guggenheim, production designer Ralph Eggleston, and writers Joel Cohen, Alec Sokolow, Andrew Stanton, and Joss Whedon all won awards for Best Individual Achievement in their respective fields for their work on the film. The film also won Best Individual Achievement in technical achievement.

Toy Story was nominated for two Golden Globe Awards, one for Best Motion Picture—Comedy or Musical, and one for Best Original Song—Motion Picture for Newman's "You've Got a Friend in Me". At both the Los Angeles Film Critics Association Awards and the Kansas City Film Critics Circle Awards, the film won "Best Animated Film". Toy Story is also among the top ten in the BFI list of the 50 films you should see by the age of 14, and the highest-placed (at No. 99) animated film in Empire magazine's list of "500 Greatest Movies of All Time". In 2005, Toy Story, along with Toy Story 2 was voted the fourth greatest cartoon in Channel 4's 100 Greatest Cartoons poll, behind The Simpsons, Tom and Jerry, and South Park.

== Influence and legacy ==
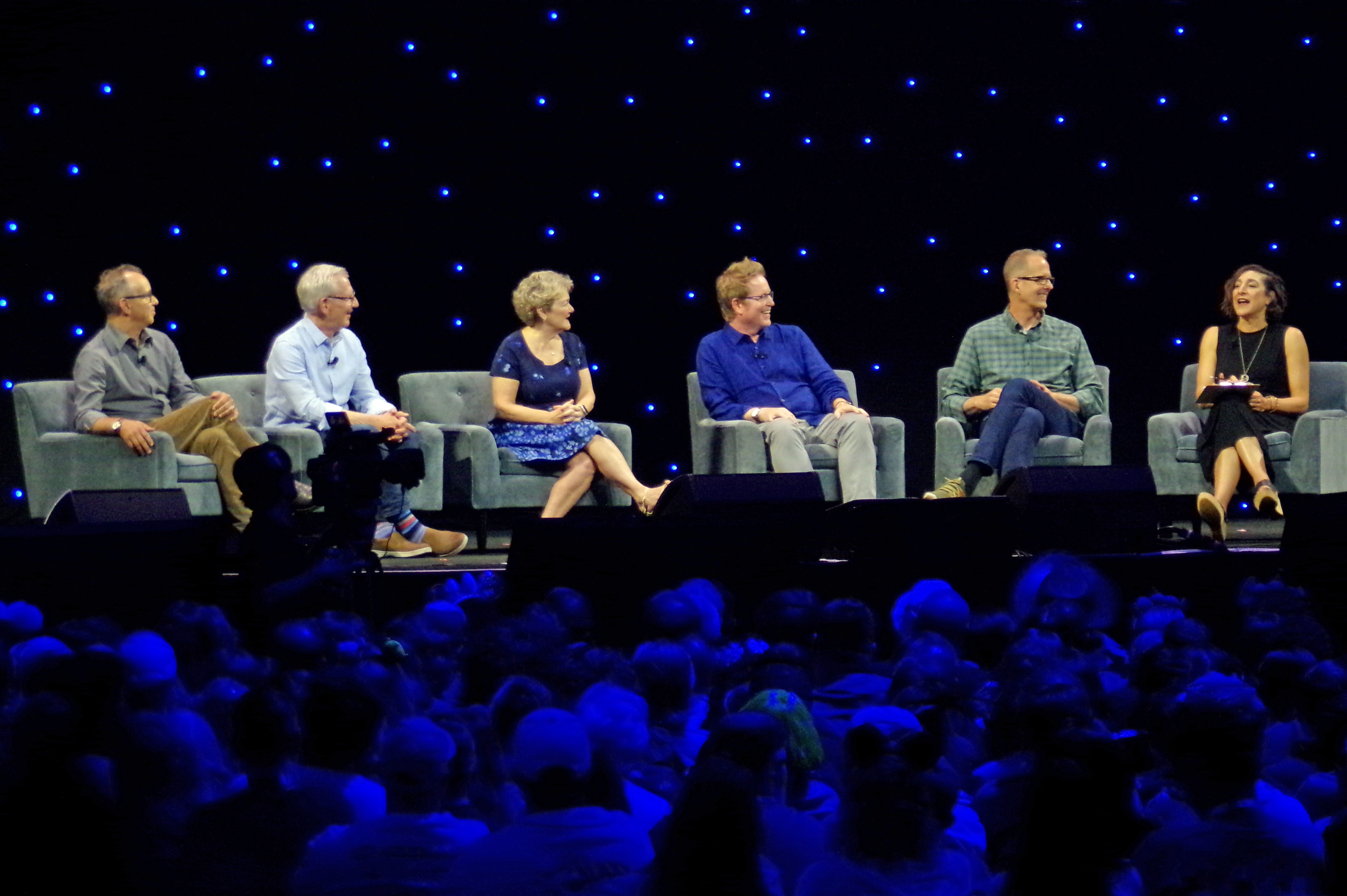
Jonas Rivera, Bob Pauley, Bonnie Arnold, Andrew Stanton, Pete Docter, and Katherine Sarafian discussed the film and its legacy at D23 2024.

Toy Story had a large effect on the film industry with its innovative computer animation. After the film's debut, various industries were interested in the technology used for the film. Graphics chip makers desired to compute imagery similar to the film's animation for personal computers, game developers wanted to learn how to replicate the animation for video games, and robotics researchers were interested in building artificial intelligence into their machines that compared to the film's lifelike characters.. Various authors have also compared the film to an interpretation of Don Quixote as well as humanism. In addition, Toy Story left an impact with its catchphrase "To Infinity and Beyond", sequels, and software, among others. In 2005, Toy Story was selected by the United States Library of Congress to be preserved in the National Film Registry for being "culturally, historically, or aesthetically significant".

=== "To Infinity... and Beyond!" ===
Buzz Lightyear's line "To Infinity and Beyond!" has been used not only on themed merchandise, but among philosophers and mathematical theorists as well. In 2008, during STS-124, astronauts took an action figure of Buzz Lightyear into space on Space Shuttle Discovery as part of an educational experience for students while stressing the catchphrase. The action figure was used for experiments in zero-g. It was reported in 2008 that a father and son had continually repeated the phrase to help them keep track of each other while treading water for 15 hours in the Atlantic Ocean. The phrase occurs in the lyrics of Beyoncé's 2008 song "Single Ladies (Put a Ring on It)", during the bridge. In 2012, the late Capital STEEZ released a song titled "Infinity and Beyond" in reference to the phrase as part of his AmeriKKKan Korruption mixtape.

Disney has also recycled the phrase in homage to Toy Story at least twice. In the "blooper reel" shown during the credits of A Bug's Life, Dave Foley says the line while in character as Flik, and Tim Allen himself repeated his famous line in The Shaggy Dog, in a scene when the titular character jumps off a bridge onto a moving vehicle.

=== Other influences ===
Toy Story's cast of characters forms the basis for the naming of the releases of the Debian computer operating system, from Debian 1.1 Buzz, the first release with a codename, in 1996, to Debian 14 Forky, the most-recently announced future release.

In 2013, Pixar designed a "Gromit Lightyear" sculpture based on the Aardman Animations character Gromit for Gromit Unleashed, which sold for £65,000.

== Sequels and spin-off ==
=== Toy Story 2 ===
The first sequel, titled Toy Story 2, was released on November 24, 1999. In the film, Woody is stolen by a toy collector, leading Buzz and his friends to launch a rescue mission. Initially, Toy Story 2 was going to be a direct-to-video release, with development beginning in 1996. However, after the cast from Toy Story returned and the story was considered to be better than that of a direct-to-video release, it was announced in 1998 that the sequel would see a theatrical release.

=== Toy Story 3 ===
Toy Story 3 was released on June 18, 2010. In the film, Andy's toys are accidentally donated to a day-care center as he prepares to leave for college.

=== Toy Story 4 ===
Toy Story 4 was released on June 21, 2019, with most of the main cast returning for the film. In the film, Woody, Buzz, and the rest of the gang get used to living with Bonnie, who creates a new toy named Forky, from recycled materials from school. As they go on a road trip with Bonnie, Woody is also reunited with Bo Peep, and must decide where his loyalties lie.

=== Lightyear ===
A spin-off film, Lightyear, was released on June 17, 2022, with Chris Evans portraying the original Buzz Lightyear, upon whom the toy given to Andy in the first film was based.

=== Toy Story 5 ===
On February 8, 2023, Disney announced that a fifth Toy Story film was in development. In the film, Jessie, now the leader after Woody's departure, and the rest of the toys have to deal with Lillypad, a tablet whose taking all of Bonnie's playtime. It was released on June 19, 2026.

== See also ==
- List of films with a 100% rating on Rotten Tomatoes, a film review aggregator website
- List of animated films considered the best
- The Brave Little Toaster
- How the Toys Saved Christmas
- Live Action Toy Story
- The Velveteen Rabbit

== Bibliography ==
- Isaacson, Walter (2011). Steve Jobs. New York: Simon & Schuster. ISBN 978-1-4516-4853-9.
- Kanfer, Stefan (2000) [1997]. Serious Business: The Art and Commerce of Animation in America from Betty Boop to Toy Story. New York: Da Capo Press. ISBN 978-0-306-80918-7.
- Paik, Karen (2007). To Infinity and Beyond!: The Story of Pixar Animation Studios. San Francisco: Chronicle Books. ISBN 978-0-8118-5012-4.
- Price, David (2008). The Pixar Touch: The Making of a Company. New York: Alfred A. Knopf. ISBN 978-0-307-26575-3.
