= Helen Herrick Malsed =

American toy inventor (1910–1998)

Helen H. Malsed
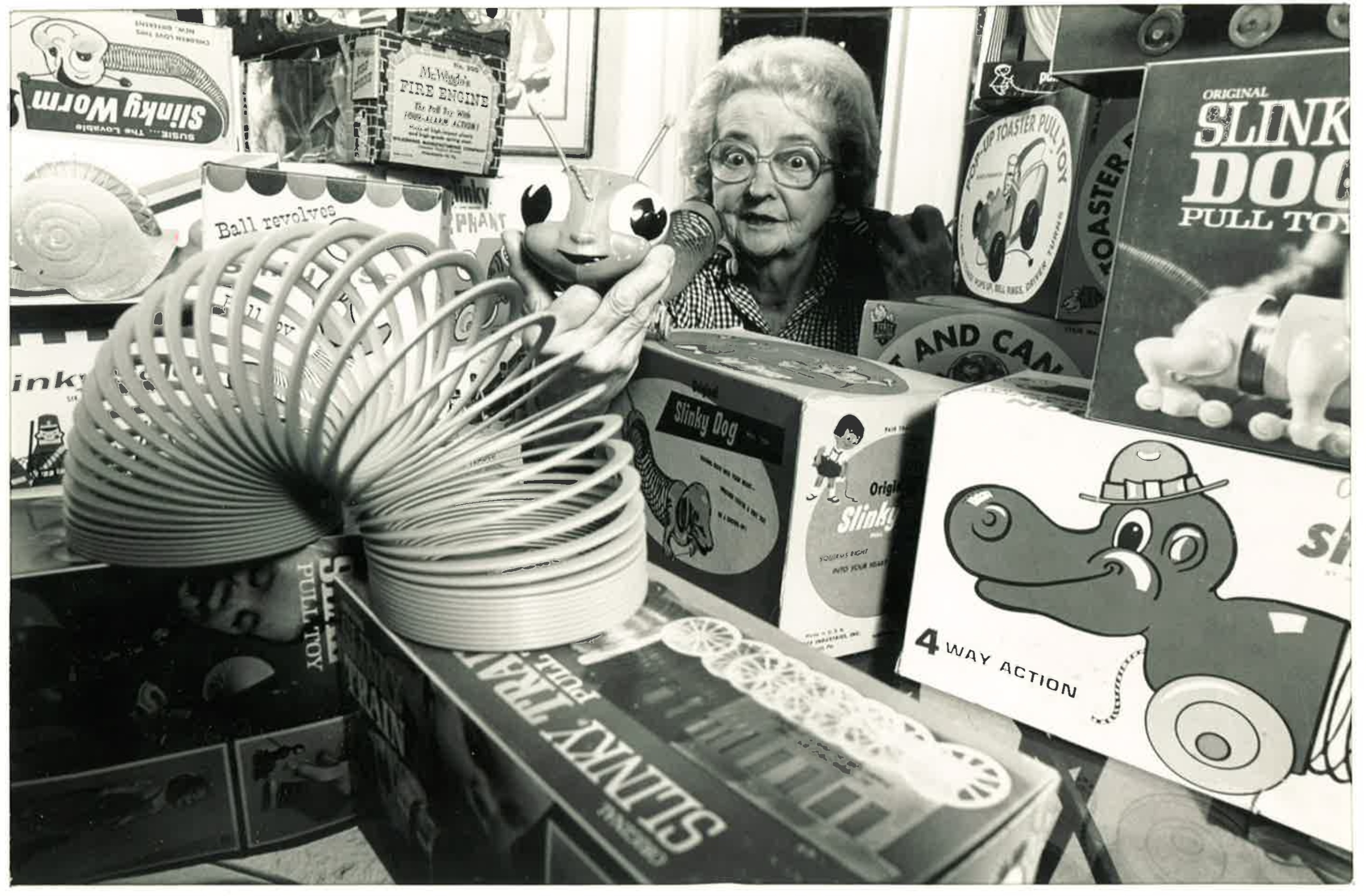
- Helen Herrick Malsed with toys she created
- Born: 1910; Cincinnati, Ohio, U.S.
- Died: November 13, 1998 (aged 87–88); Seattle, Washington
- Occupation: Toy Inventor
- Spouse: Marion Parker Malsed
- Children: Fredrick Malsed
- Parent: Fred Herrick

Helen Herrick Malsed (1910 – November 13, 1998) was an American toy inventor. Her notable toys include the Slinky Dog and Slinky Train, based on the Slinky.

== Biography ==
Malsed was born in Cincinnati to Fred Herrick, a lumber operator. She lived in St. Maries, Idaho, then Spokane, Washington with her family. For high school, Helen attended Annie Wright Seminary (now Annie Wright Schools) in Tacoma, WA where she graduated in 1928. She dropped out of Whitman College due to her family's finances, then went on to study advertising in San Francisco. She met Marion Parker Malsed while they both were working at Seattle's Fredrick & Nelson department store, and she and Marion Parker Malsed married. She had a son, Fredrick.

== Inventions ==
Notably, Malsed invented and patented the Slinky Train and Slinky Dog through James Industries in 1957. Malsed received royalties of $60,000 to $70,000 annually for 17 years on her patent for the Slinky pull-toy idea, but never visited the plant. The slinky dog was later popularized by the 1995 movie Toy Story. In 1958, Malsed sold the idea that would become Fisher-Price Snap Lock Beads for $5,000. Its predecessor was pop bead jewelry which was popular at the time, but were choking hazards for children. Malsed's idea enlarged it into brightly colored beads for kids. Other inventions included the 'Buzz-around Bee' and 'Mr.Zip Pull Toys'.
