= Betty James =

20th-century American businesswoman (1918-2008)

- Born: Betty Mattas; February 13, 1918; Altoona, Pennsylvania, U.S.
- Died: November 20, 2008 (aged 90); Philadelphia, Pennsylvania, U.S.
- Education: Pennsylvania State University
- Occupation: Businessperson
- Employer(s): James Industries, Inc.
- Known for: Naming the Slinky
- Spouse: Richard T. James
- Children: 6

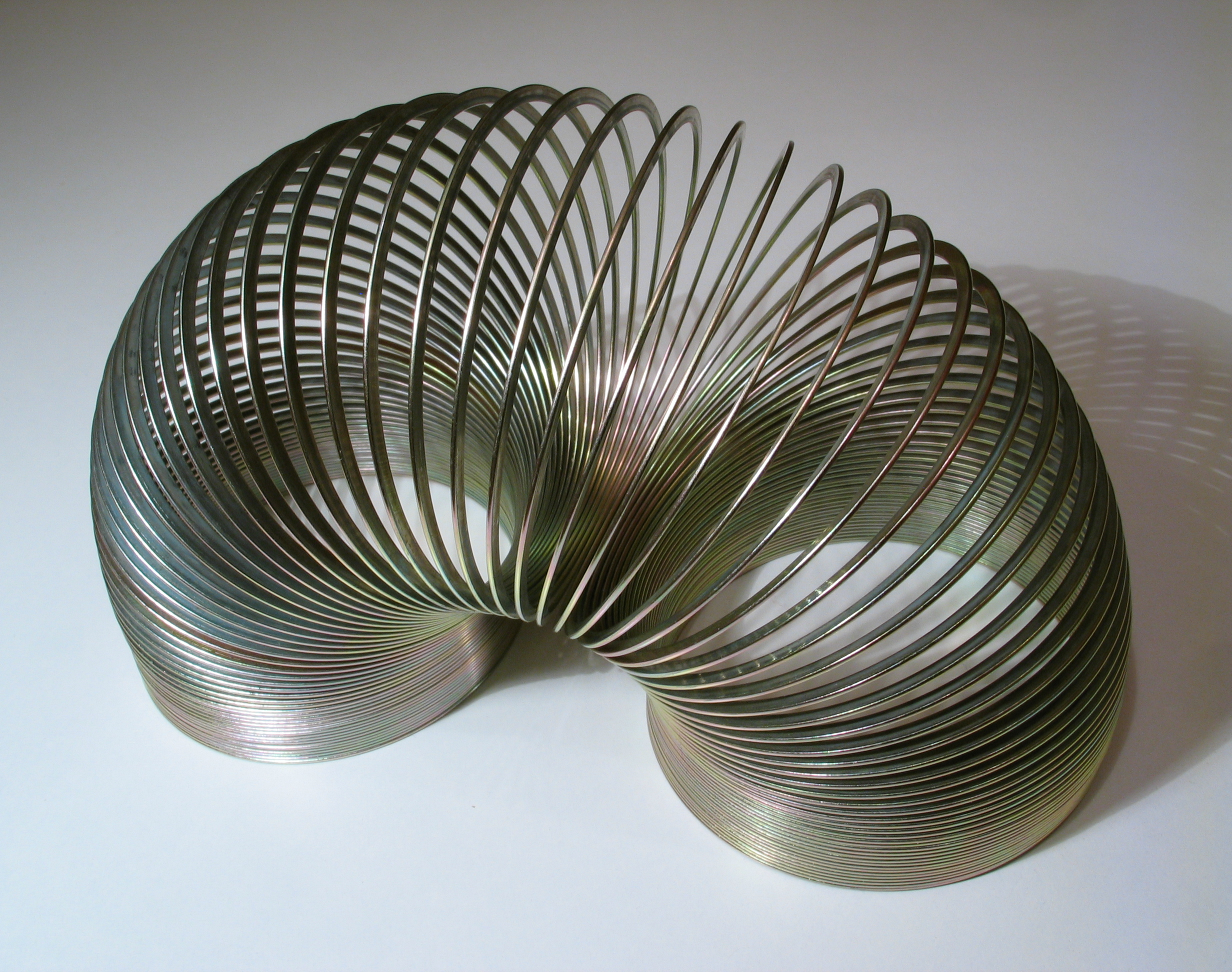
Betty gave the name Slinky to this spiral metal toy.

Betty M. James (February 13, 1918 – November 20, 2008) was an American businessperson who came up with the name for the Slinky her husband Richard T. James invented. She ran James Industries, the firm that manufactured the toy, by herself starting in 1960 after her husband left the firm and the family.

== Early life ==
She was born as Betty Mattas on February 13, 1918, in Altoona, Pennsylvania. She attended Altoona Area High School and then Pennsylvania State University, leaving when she married Richard T. James.

== Career ==
Betty's husband, an engineer, conceived of the toy in 1943 while working at Cramp Shipbuilding Yard in the Port Richmond section of Philadelphia after a torsion spring fell off a table and started flipping end-over-end across the floor. The following year, Betty came up with the name Slinky after leafing through the dictionary and thinking that the word described the motion of the spring. The couple made 400 of the toys and convinced the Gimbels department store in Philadelphia to carry the toy for Christmas 1945 displayed on a ramp. These first models were all sold within 90 minutes at a price of $1 each.

Betty James insisted upon keeping the original Slinky affordable. The Slinky toy sold for $1.00 in 1945. If the Slinky's sale price kept pace with inflation, the Slinky would have sold for $13.83 in 2018. In 1996, when the Slinky's retail price ranged from $1.89 to $2.69, she told The New York Times: "So many children can’t have expensive toys, and I feel a real obligation to them. I’m appalled when I go Christmas shopping and $60 to $80 for a toy is nothing." In 2008, Slinkys cost $4 to $5, and Slinky Dogs about $20.

In the face of declining sales, her husband left the family and moved to Bolivia in 1960 to join Wycliffe Bible Translators. She took over management of the firm, and responsibility for the family's six children, running it for almost 40 years until selling the company to POOF Products of Plymouth, Michigan in 1998. The Slinky Dog helped turn around the sales slump and a new version issued after a version featured in the 1995 movie Toy Story was another top seller.

She was inducted into the Toy Industry Hall of Fame in 2001.

== Later life and death ==
James died at age 90 on November 20, 2008, of congestive heart failure at the Hospital of the University of Pennsylvania in Philadelphia. She had lived in Hollidaysburg, Pennsylvania, where James Industries was headquartered. By the time of her death in 2008, Slinkys were priced from $4 to $5, with Slinky Dogs selling for about $20. More than 300 million Slinkys in all their variations had been sold in her lifetime.
