= Sonia Paço-Rocchia =

Canadian composer, avant-garde musician and artist

- Occupations: Composer, artist, programmer, bassoonist, improviser
- Awards: Prix Opus
- Website: musinou.net

Sonia Paço-Rocchia (/so.ˈnja ˈpa.so ˈrɔ.kja/), born in 1982 in Montreal, is a composer, multidisciplinary artist, improviser, bassoonist and creative coder.

== Biography ==
After graduating in mixed music composition from the Université de Montréal in 2005, she began her career in Europe, where she was based mainly in London. She later moved to the Laurentides region in Quebec. Her work has been shown in a dozen countries, including Canada, England and Belgium. In 2019, she became the first woman to receive the Prix Opus in the "Creation of the Year" category.

Sonia Paço-Rocchia's approach focuses on sounds, timbres and open musical forms. Her research includes the exploitation and expansion of the sound palettes of instruments through playing techniques or live electronics, inventing her own instruments and instrument automatons. Her pieces frequently involve a visual or theatrical aspect.

Sonia Paço-Rocchia is bassoonist-improviser with the London Improvisers Orchestra. She regularly improvises with chamber ensembles, such as The Fantastique Quintet, VibraLib and ZzCc or as a soloist.

== Work ==
=== Compositions ===
- Justine et les machines, opera on a libretto by Marie-Ève Bouchard, commissioned by the 3 FEMMES prize by Mécénat Musica (2021-2022)
- Trouée, a work for baritone saxophone (doubling on piccolo), contrabass clarinet, two Tables de Babel (instrument by Jean-François Laporte), Orgue de sirène (instrument by Jean-François Laporte), percussion including an electric Lame, (Note: Instrument invented and designed by Sonia Paço-Rocchia) a Stemsaw and a Flex-a-tone on stand, and multi-channel live electronics. This work was commissioned by SuperMusique and Totem Contemporain, and was nominated as a finalist for the Prix Opus "Creation of the Year" in 2020 (2019)
- Ode au métal is a work for saxophone quartet performing inside an installation, made of large metal pieces augmented with electronics, as well as quadraphonic live electronics. This work was commissioned by the saxophone quartet Quasar. Ode au métal was awarded two Prix Opus, "Creation of the Year" and "Concert of the Year, New Music, Electroacoustic" as well as an Excellence award in performing arts from the Grands Prix de la culture des Laurentides. (2019)
- Si on l'ouvrait is a composition for alto flute, bass clarinet, violin, cello, piano, Flex on a stand, sensor boxes, projection automaton and quadraphonic live electronics. This work was commissioned by the Ensemble Paramirabo. (2019)
- Nouvelle vie, nouvelle ville is a harbour symphony created for the 375th anniversary of the founding of the city of Montreal. Commissioned by the Pointe à Callière Museum, it is a composition for brass quintet (Magnitude6), musical saw, Stemsaw, quadraphonic live electronics, (Note: Designed and coded by Sonia Paço-Rocchia) train sirens, boats sirens and the carillon of Notre-Dame Basilica. (2017)
- Said, live coding performance made with a live coding web platform developed by the artist, presented among others places at StudioXX (2017)
- D’un autre côté, for guitar, harp, harpsichord, cymbalum, double bass, five Cubes that are sound triggers and live electronics. A work commissioned by Code d'accès for the ensemble Punctum. (2014)
- Hommage, for 32 bassoons around the public. (2011)
- Il temps-te, variations and improvisations avec theatricality, for cornet, flugelhorn, piccolo trumpet, trumpet and quadraphonic live electronics. (2006)
- Soupirs, for solo clarinet, voice and live electronics. (2005)
- CAM, for seven musicians playing Société de transport de Montréal metro cards, amplification on a quadraphonic setup. (2001)

=== Installations ===
- When the Saws are Alone in the Woods, an automated musical saw quartet installed in a sugar maple forest that can be visited virtually and interacted with via an online poetic journey in which each choice influences the composition and the video. (2020)
- Flex, a sound, kinetic and interactive installation, an automated flexatone ensemble playing an interactive non-linear composition, presented in Curiosités sonores ambulantes (the artist's van-gallery). (2019, 2022)
- Ode au métal is a work for saxophone quartet performing inside an installation, made of large metal pieces augmented with electronics, as well as quadraphonic live electronics. This work was commissioned by the saxophone quartet Quasar. Ode au métal was awarded two Prix Opus, "Creation of the Year" and "Concert of the Year, New Music, Electroacoustic" as well as an Excellence award in performing arts from the Grands Prix de la culture des Laurentides. (2019)
- Réflexion a sound, visual and robotic installation with web-interactivity, an installation for automated moving mirrors, projection and non-linear composition presented at Agence Topo (2019)
- Lames, site-specific interactive sound installation for automated musical saw ensemble, commissioned by Centre Daïmôn, Hull, for the Interstices 150th of Confederation event (2017), presented at Electric Eclectics Festival, Meaford and at NAISA, South River.
- Scies, interactive sound installation with generative non-linear composition for ensemble of sound automatons made from circular saw blades (2016), presented at Modern Fuel Gallery during Tone Deaf.
- Hélix, a site-specific interactive sound installation with up to twenty Helixophone automatons, an instrument based on the Slinky invented by the artist (2013) Hélix was presented at City Sonic, Mons, Carré 150 during Festival International de Musique Actuelle de Victoriaville, Quai 5160, Montréal, PHOS, Espace F, Matane, Centre d'art visuel d'Alberta, Edmonton, among others.

== Exhibitions ==
=== Solo exhibitions ===
- Centre d'exposition de Val David, Québec (online) (2020)
- NAISA, South River, Ontario (2019)
- Agence Topo, Montreal, Quebec (2019)
- Centre d’art visuel d’Alberta, Edmonton (2018)
- Quai 5160, Verdun, Quebec (2017-2018)
- Carré 150, Victoriaville, Quebec (2017)
- Transcultures, Mons, Belgique (2013)

=== Group exhibitions ===
- Electric Eclectics Festival, Meaford, Ontario (2019)
- Traverse, Atelier de l'île, Val David, Quebec (2019)
- PHOS, Espace F, Matane, Quebec (2018)
- Interstices, Daïmôn, Hull, Quebec (2017)
- Festival International de Musique Actuelle de Victoriaville, Québec (2017)
- Tone Deaf, Modern Fuel, Kingston, Ontario (2016)
- Hörlursfestival, Sollefteå, Sweden (2013)
- City Sonic and Park in Progress, International sound art festival, Mons, Belgium (2013)
- Installation sur le Slinky version pour la Croatie, Vrijeme nakon 2011, Gallery Kortil, Rijeka, Croatia (2011)
- Leytonstone Arts Trail, London (2010)
- Interactive Sound Installation on Living Room Scale Installation by Takako Jin, during Leytonstone Art Trail, London (2009)
- A Cup of Tea Solves Everything, London (2009)

== Discography ==
- Sonia Paço-Rocchia, Improvisation For Bicycle
- LIO LEO LEON, Emanem Disc
- Cornelius Cardew – The Great Learning
- Hutch Demouilpied – Otherness Album
- Avant-garde-robe

== Awards and recognition ==
- Finalist for the Artiste de l'année des Laurentides award from the Conseil des arts et des lettres du Québec
- Winner of the Excellence in performing arts award from the Grands Prix de la culture des Laurentides for her work Ode au métal, her research and her international outreach
- Winner of the Mécénat Musica's 3 FEMMES award 2020-2021
- Finalist in the "Creation of the Year" category of the Prix Opus for her work Trouée in 2020
- Winner of the Prix Opus, in the category "Creation of the Year" for the work Ode to Metal in 2019
- Winner of the Prix Opus, in the category "Concert of the year, new and electroacoustic music" for her work Ode au métal en 2019
- Winner of the Prix Jeune relève in visual art, Grands Prix de la culture des Laurentides in 2018 for her work as a whole
