= Hollidaysburg, Pennsylvania =

Borough in Pennsylvania, US

- Borough
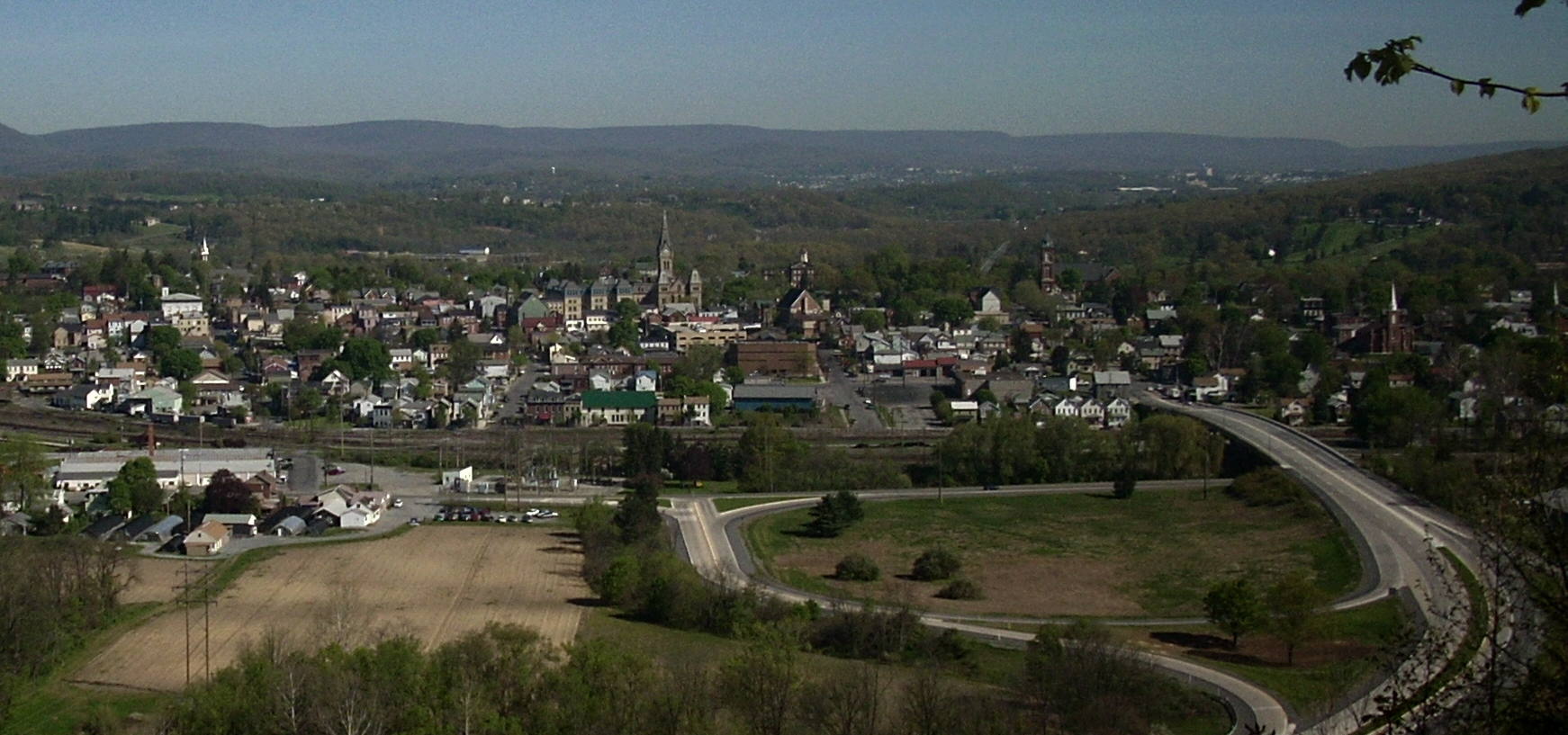
- Hollidaysburg skyline

- Location of Hollidaysburg in Blair County, Pennsylvania (left) and of Blair County in Pennsylvania (right)

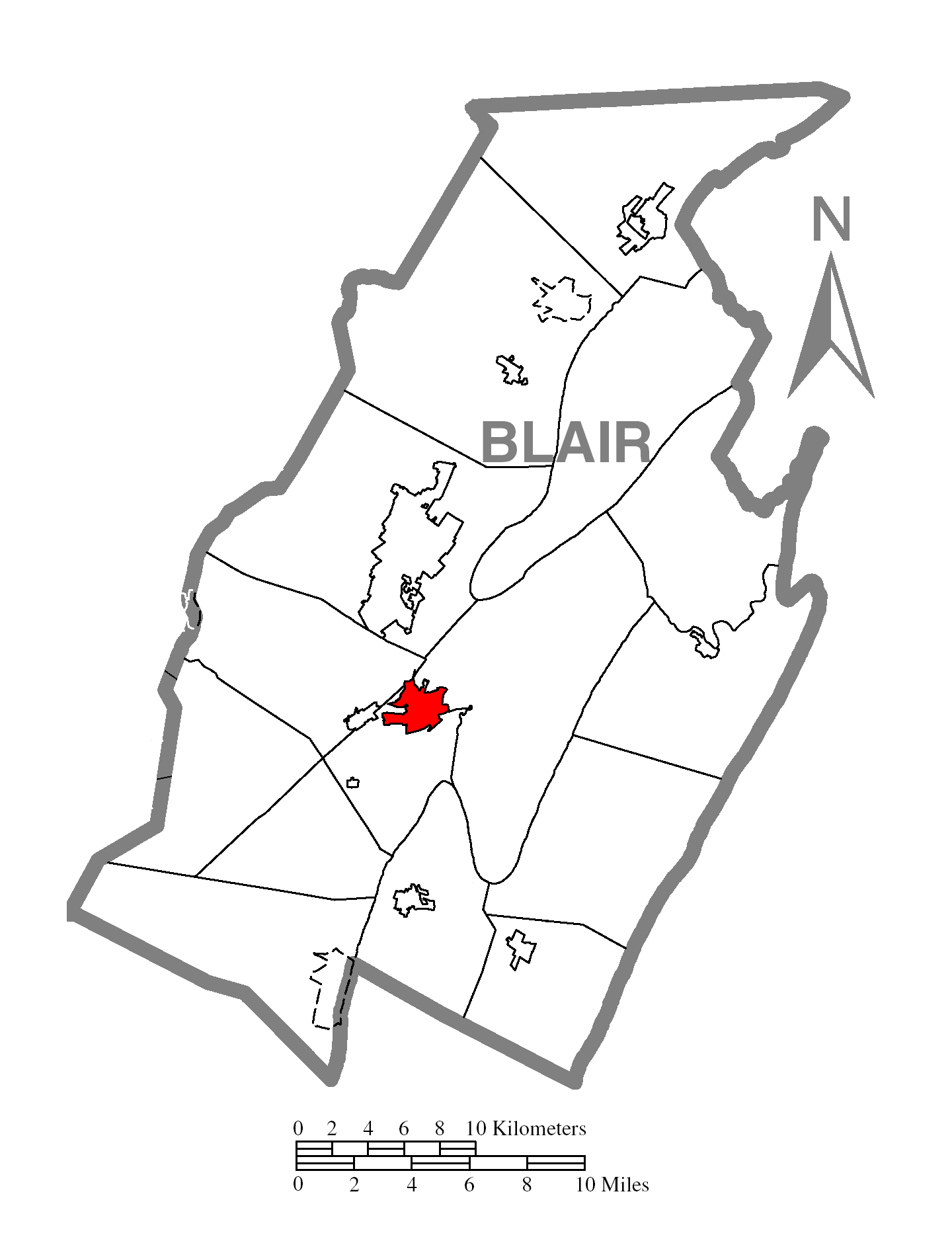
- Map of Blair County highlighting Hollidaysburg
- Coordinates: 40°25′54″N 78°23′32″W
- Country: United States
- State: Pennsylvania
- County: Blair County
- Settled: 1768
- Incorporated (borough): 1836

Government
  - Type: Council-Manager
  - Mayor: Joseph R. Dodson

Area
  - Total: 2.33 sq mi (6.03 km^{2})
  - Land: 2.33 sq mi (6.03 km^{2})
  - Water: 0 sq mi (0.00 km^{2})
- Elevation: 1,011 ft (308 m)

Population (2020)
  - Total: 5,641
  - Density: 2,420.9/sq mi (934.73/km^{2})
- Time zone: UTC-5 (EST)
  - Summer (DST): UTC-4 (EDT)
- Zip Code: 16648
- Area code: 814
- FIPS code: 42-35224
- GNIS feature ID: 1214942
- Website: http://hollidaysburgpa.org

Hollidaysburg is a borough in and the county seat of Blair County in the U.S. Commonwealth of Pennsylvania. It is located on the Juniata River, 5 miles (8 km) south of Altoona and is part of the Altoona, Pennsylvania, metropolitan statistical area. In 1900, 2,998 people lived in the borough, in 1910, 3,734 lived there, and in 1940, 5,910 residents were counted. The population was 5,641 at the 2020 census. Coal, iron ore, ganister, and limestone are found in the vicinity. In the past, the borough had foundries and machine shops, a silk mill, car works and classification yards.

From 1834 to 1854, the borough was an important port on Pennsylvania Main Line Canal, where the Juniata Division Canal connected to the Allegheny Portage Railroad.

The center of Hollidaysburg is frequently referred to as "The Diamond," where the buildings and parking spaces form a diamond. This area serves as the hub for parades, festivals and other town celebrations.

== History ==
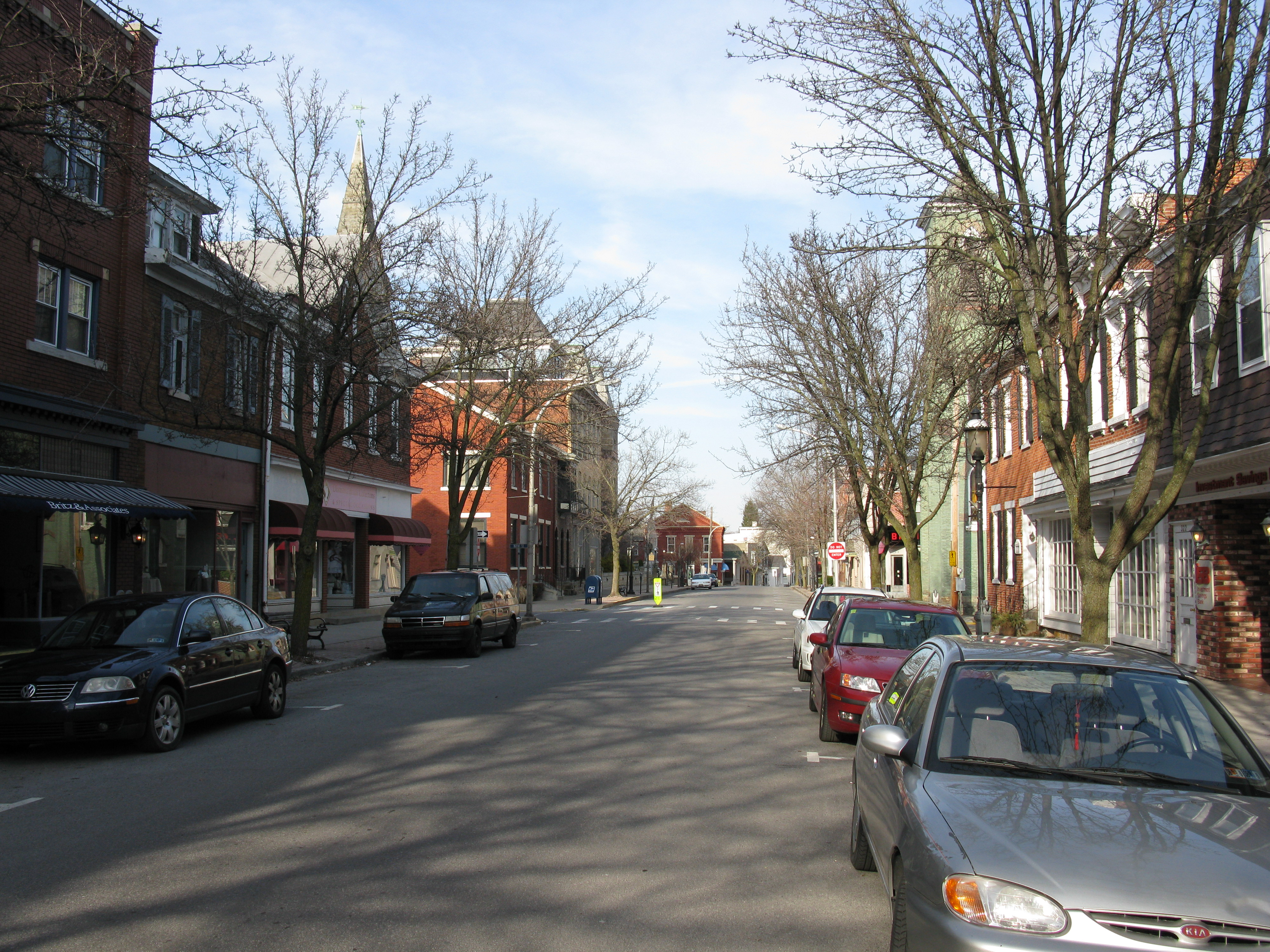
Allegheny Street

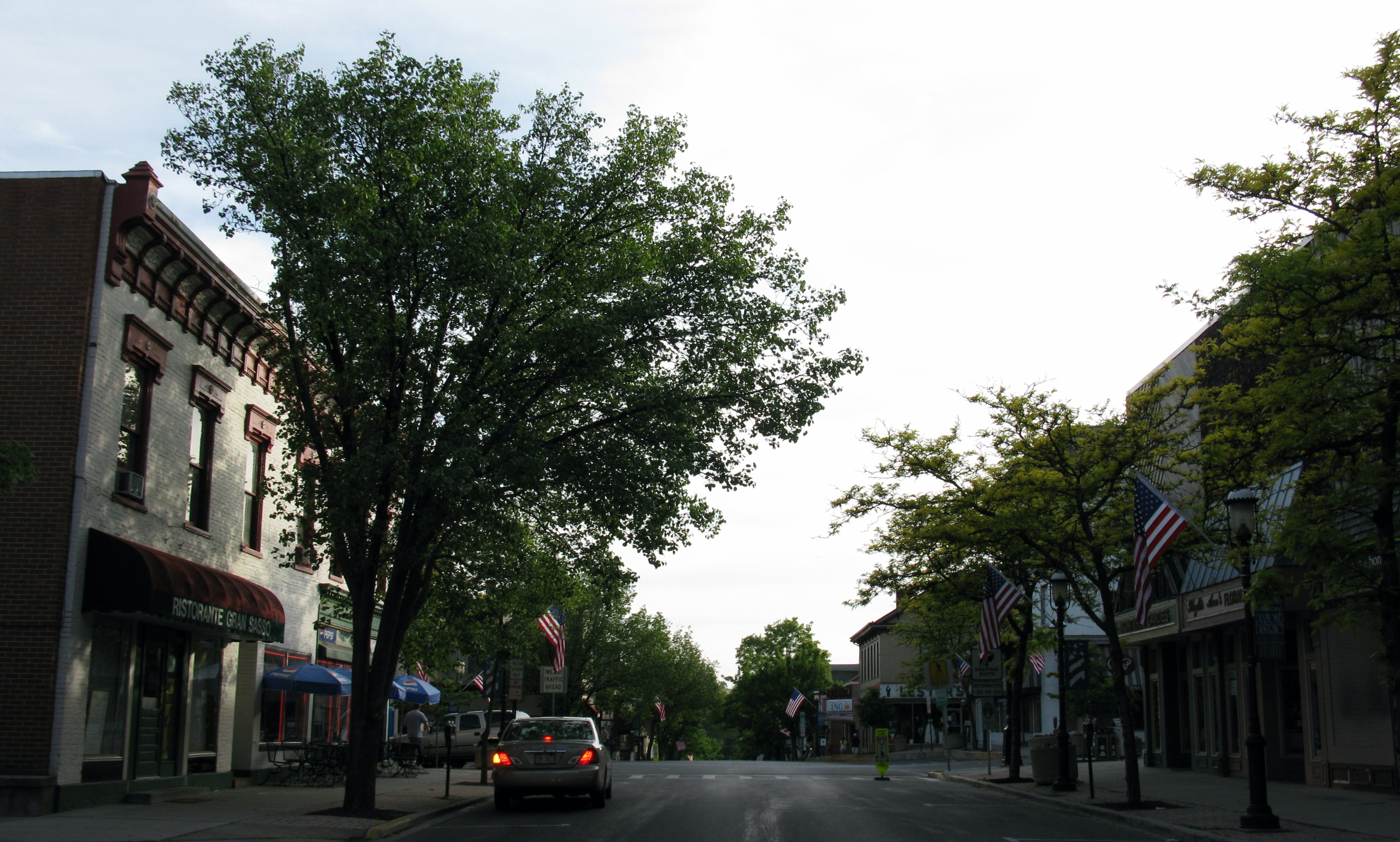
Allegheny Street

Hollidaysburg was first laid out in 1796 and was named after Adam and William Holliday, Irish immigrants who founded the settlement; by 1814 it consisted of several houses and a tavern. Hollidaysburg became the main transfer point between the Pennsylvania Canal and the Portage Railroad, a gateway to western Pennsylvania. The canal and Portage Railroad spurred industrial and commercial development in Hollidaysburg in the 1830s. In 1836, Hollidaysburg was established as a borough.

When Blair County was organized in 1846, the Borough of Hollidaysburg was designated the county seat. This designation allowed the borough to prosper when politicians and attorneys became attracted to the borough.

In 1903, the Pennsylvania Railroad constructed a large switching yard and US 22 was directed through the borough. In addition, the Pennsylvania Railroad Constructed the Hollidaysburg Car shop to help ease the bustling of the Altoona Shops. Years later, Conrail also built a car reclamation plant on the property. Following the closure of the car shops in the late 1990's, the site was redeveloped with the assistance of the Altoona-Blair County Redevelopment Corporation. The site is a major regional employer that is currently occupied by Curry Rail Services and DeGol Industries.

In 2022, a team from Hollidaysburg qualified for the Little League World Series. They had a record of 3-2, with both losses being at the hands of the team from Pearland, Texas.

== Government ==
Hollidaysburg has a council–manager form of government. Voters elect a seven-member borough council who serve four-year terms. The borough council is responsible for formulating policies, enacting ordinances, setting tax rates, approving the annual budget, and appointing the Borough Manager. Ethan Imhoff serves as the current Borough Manager.

Council is a policy-making board and the manager is chief administrative officer. The roles of a council are to adopt goals and objectives, establish priorities, approve programs, approve expenditures, and approve contracts. The current Borough Council president for the 2025 term is Sean Burke. The Mayor of Hollidaysburg is Joe Dodson.

== Historic district ==
Hollidaysburg established a local historic district in 1989 and implemented a historic district ordinance. The purpose of the ordinance is to preserve the unique architectural and historical qualities of the borough. This ordinance regulates alterations, additions, new construction and demolition in the district. The Hollidaysburg Historic District encompasses the central part of the borough. There are roughly 400 structures in the District. These structures are classified as Significant, Contributing, and Non-Contributing.

The Historical and Architectural Review Board is responsible for the review and regulation of changes within the district. This advisory board consists of seven members. The process involves making an application to get a Certificate of Appropriateness (COA). HARB Application. This application is then reviewed by the board at its regular monthly meeting. HARB/HPC Meeting Agenda The HARB makes a recommendation to the borough council, who reviews the request and makes a final decision at its regular monthly meeting. If approved, a Certificate of Appropriateness is awarded and a zoning permit will be issued for the work. There can be additional charges per the zoning permit, depending upon the type of project.

The Hollidaysburg Historic District was added to the National Register of Historic Places in 1985. Located in the district and separately listed are the Blair County Courthouse and Highland Hall.

== Geography ==
According to the United States Census Bureau, the borough has a total area of 2.4 square miles (6.2 km^{2}), all land.

== Demographics ==
Historical population
Census	Pop.	Note	%±
1840	1,896		—
1850	2,430		28.2%
1860	2,469		1.6%
1870	2,952		19.6%
1880	3,150		6.7%
1890	2,975		−5.6%
1900	2,998		0.8%
1910	3,734		24.5%
1920	4,071		9.0%
1930	5,969		46.6%
1940	5,910		−1.0%
1950	6,483		9.7%
1960	6,475		−0.1%
1970	6,262		−3.3%
1980	5,892		−5.9%
1990	5,624		−4.5%
2000	5,368		−4.6%
2010	5,791		7.9%
2020	5,641		−2.6%
U.S. Decennial Census

As of the 2000 census, there were 5,368 people, 2,224 households, and 1,349 families residing in the borough. The population density was 2,261.0 inhabitants per square mile (873.0/km^{2}). There were 2,392 housing units at an average density of 1,007.5/sq mi (389.0/km^{2}). The racial makeup of the borough was 98.19% White, 0.82% African American, 0.17% Native American, 0.26% Asian, 0.06% from other races, and 0.50% from two or more races. Hispanic or Latino of any race were 0.48% of the population.

There were 2,224 households, out of which 26.0% had children under the age of 18 living with them, 45.7% were married couples living together, 12.0% had a female householder with no husband present, and 39.3% were non-families. 35.3% of all households were made up of individuals, and 16.7% had someone living alone who was 65 years of age or older. The average household size was 2.21 and the average family size was 2.88.

In the borough, the population was spread out, with 20.5% under the age of 18, 7.9% from 18 to 24, 26.8% from 25 to 44, 23.1% from 45 to 64, and 21.7% who were 65 years of age or older. The median age was 42 years. For every 100 females there were 88.4 males. For every 100 females age 18 and over, there were 86.8 males.

The median income for a household in the borough was $36,758, and the median income for a family was $43,209. Males had a median income of $33,315 versus $24,627 for females. The per capita income for the borough was $20,634. About 5.5% of families and 8.8% of the population were below the poverty line, including 9.9% of those under age 18 and 7.3% of those age 65 or over.

== Education ==
Hollidaysburg Area Senior High School and Junior High School, as well as C.W. Longer Elementary School are in the Borough of Hollidaysburg. The school district is Hollidaysburg Area School District..

== Emergency services ==
The Hollidaysburg Police Department is located in the municipal building on Blair Street. It has nine full-time officers, and a small component of auxiliary police, including one parking meter attendant. The fleet consists of Ford Explorer patrol vehicles. Shifts are eight hours, and there are one to two officers on duty 24 hours a day. They respond to over 4000 calls for service per year.

The fire department is formally known as Phoenix Volunteer Fire Department, Blair County fire station 10. It is an all-volunteer fire department, and is over 100 years old. It consists of approximately 20 active volunteers, and responds to fires, vehicle accidents, medical incidents, and other public service details, using a four-vehicle fleet. The department responds to approximately 500 calls for service per year.

EMS services are provided by Hollidaysburg American Legion Ambulance Service and Blair County stations 410, 418, and 419. The service is a career department, employing casual and full-time personnel, including approximately twenty casual EMTs and paramedics, and nearly the same number full-time. The service originally started as a single ambulance, volunteer organization, in 1939, serving the borough. Over the years, it has grown substantially, and today operates four ambulances 24 hours a day, covering the boroughs of Hollidaysburg, Martinsburg, the town of Williamsburg, and the townships of Blair, Frankstown, Catharine, Woodbury, North Woodbury, and Huston; as well as providing paramedic assistance to ambulance services in several areas of Bedford County. The service answers roughly 5500 emergency calls and non-emergency ambulance transports per year, as well as several thousand transports using wheelchair vans. The fleet consists of eight ambulances, four wheelchair vans, and one medic response vehicle. The main station is located at 801 Scotch Valley Road in Hollidaysburg.

== Notable people ==
- Jeff Bower — NBA executive and coach
- Charlie Brenneman — mixed martial arts fighter
- James S. Frazer — Justice of the Indiana Supreme Court
- Hedda Hopper — Hollywood gossip columnist
- Maxwell Hunter — aerospace engineer
- Adam Huber; actor
- Harold L. Ickes — Secretary of the Interior for Franklin D. Roosevelt
- Betty James - came up with the name for the Slinky her husband Richard T. James invented
- John Joyce - U.S. representative
- Sam Lafferty — NHL player for the Vancouver Canucks
- Wallace McCamant — jurist
- Samuel Rea — president of the Pennsylvania Railroad from 1913–1925
- Luke Rhodes — Indianapolis Colts long snapper
- Wade Schalles — two-time NCAA collegiate wrestling champion
- Red Whittaker — roboticist
- Daniel Hale Williams — African-American surgeon and a pioneer in the field of cardiac surgery
