= Richard T. James =

American naval engineer and inventor of the Slinky helical spring (1918–1974)

- Born: Richard Thompson James; March 27, 1918; Philadelphia, Pennsylvania, U.S.
- Died: July 13, 1974 (aged 56); Cochabamba, Bolivia
- Education: Westtown School; Pennsylvania State University
- Occupations: Engineer, inventor
- Known for: Inventing the Slinky
- Spouse: Betty Mattas
- Children: 6

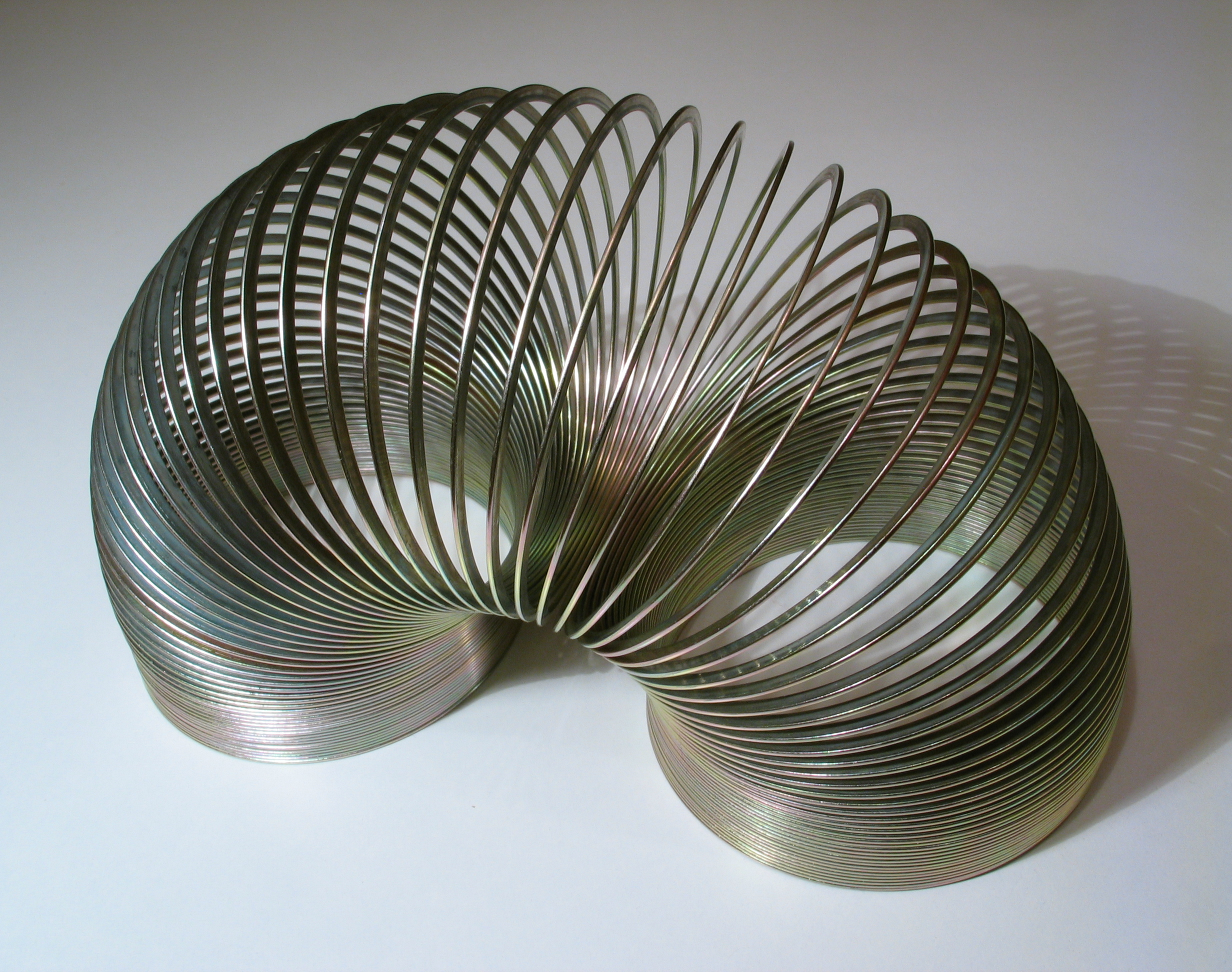
The Slinky spring toy, invented by Richard James

Richard Thompson James (March 27, 1918 – July 13, 1974) was an American naval engineer, best known for inventing the Slinky spring toy with his wife Betty James in Haverford Township, Pennsylvania in 1943.

== Education ==
James was born on March 27, 1918. In 1935, he graduated from Westtown School, a Quaker boarding school located in Chester County, Pennsylvania. In 1939, he graduated with a degree in mechanical engineering from Pennsylvania State University.

== Career ==
In 1943 James was trying to develop a means for suspending sensitive shipboard instruments aboard naval vessels, even in rough seas, and was working with torsion springs when he accidentally dropped one. Seeing how the spring kept moving after it hit the ground, the idea for a toy was born. He bought a coil-winding machine and started the James Spring & Wire Company to mass-produce the toy. The following year, Betty came up with the name Slinky after leafing through the dictionary and thinking that the word described the motion of the spring. The couple made 400 Slinkys and convinced Gimbels department store in Philadelphia to carry the toy for Christmas 1945. Originally displayed in a static position, none of the toys sold but when Richard James stepped up to demonstrate the toy in action on a ramp, the entire first production run sold out within 90 minutes at a price of $1 each. The toy became a huge success, particularly after James left the operation and Betty took over the helm. In all, a total of 300 million Slinkys have been sold, with about a quarter million still sold world-wide every year.

By the 1950s, Slinky sales were declining and Richard became affiliated with an evangelical Christian sect. In 1960, Richard went to Bolivia to join Wycliffe Bible Translators, leaving behind his wife, six children, and nearly-bankrupt company in the United States. Betty James took over as CEO of James Industries. She moved the company from Philadelphia to its current Hollidaysburg, Pennsylvania location and began an active advertising campaign, complete with the famous Slinky jingle. She ran the company until her retirement in 1998, and was inducted into the Toy Industry Hall of Fame in 2001.

Richard James died of a heart attack in 1974 in Bolivia. Betty died on November 20, 2008, age 90 of congestive heart failure at the Hospital of the University of Pennsylvania in Philadelphia, Pennsylvania.
