= Highland Hall (Hollidaysburg, Pennsylvania) =

- U.S. National Register of Historic Places
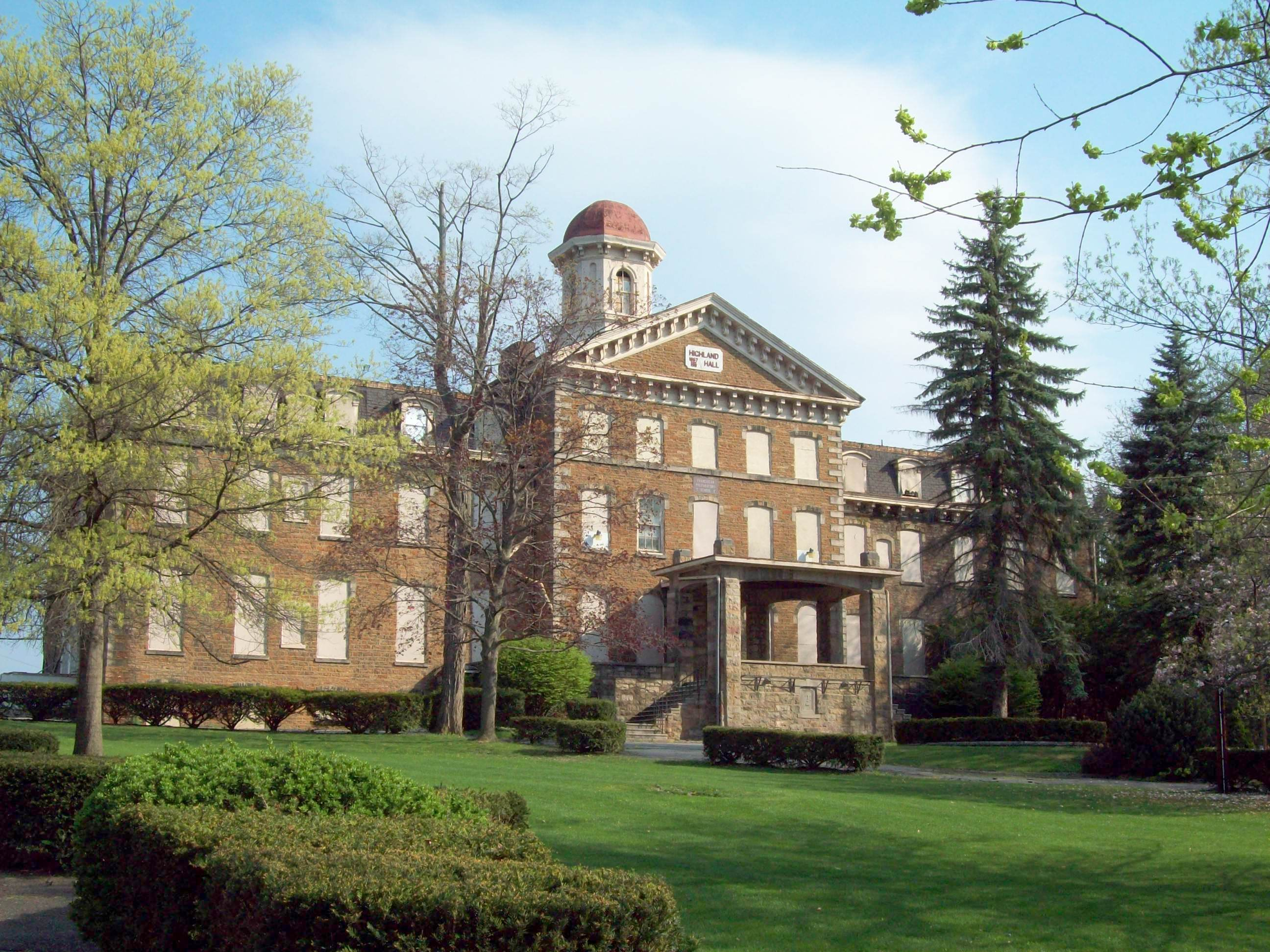
- Highland Hall, April 2010

- Location within Pennsylvania Location within the United States
- Location: 517 Walnut St., Hollidaysburg, Pennsylvania
- Coordinates: 40°25′55″N 78°23′32″W
- Area: 4.3 acres (1.7 ha)
- Built: 1865
- Architect: Samuel Sloan
- NRHP reference No.: 78002351
- Added to NRHP: September 13, 1978

Highland Hall, also known as the Courthouse Annex, was a Presbyterian seminary, an historic school building for females, a radio school during World War II, and a county office building before it became a retirement home in 2016. It is located in Hollidaysburg, Blair County, Pennsylvania.

Highland Hall was added to the National Register of Historic Places in 1978.

== History and architectural features ==
Designed by noted Philadelphia architect Samuel Sloan (1815-1884), Highland Hall was built sometime around 1865. It is now a four-story, L-shaped, stone building that features a mansard roof, which was a characteristic of the Second Empire style.

It was originally built to serve as a Presbyterian seminary for both sexes. In 1911, it became a female academy and was officially named Highland Hall. It continued to be used as a girls' school until 1940.

In 1940 it became a Roman Catholic Minor Seminary of the Third Order Regular Franciscans for young men studying for the priesthood. It closed in 1968 with four students(Karl Vargo, Robert Washco, Francis X. McGerity and Richard Williams) who transferred to St. Bernardine's Monastery for residence and continued their studies at Bishop Guilfoyle High School in Altoona.In 1969 Vargo and Williams withdrew as TOR Candidates. Rev. Robert Washco was ordained to the priesthood on June 11, 1977 for the Diocese of Cleveland/Greensburg and died on June 7, 2023. Rev. Francis X. McGerity was ordained to the priesthood on December 29,1984 for the Diocese of Corpus Christi, Tx. He is now a retired priest residing in Florida.

In 1969, it was converted into a county office building.

Highland Hall was subsequently turned into a sixty-five and older, affordable housing facility. The renovation work was performed by Keller Engineers and S&A Homes.
