= Blair County Courthouse =

Historic Gothic Revival-style Pennsylvanian building

- U.S. National Register of Historic Places
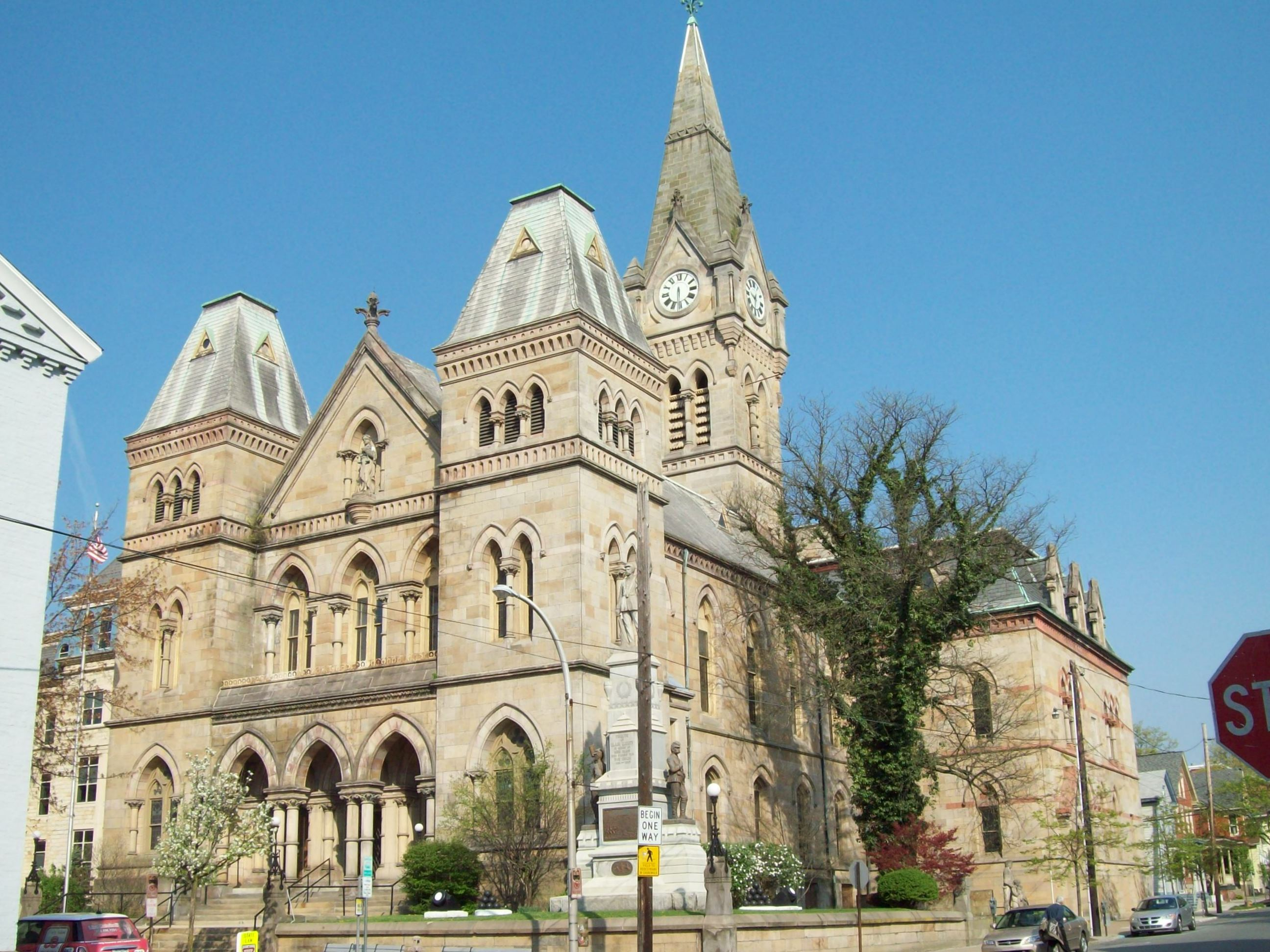
- Blair County Courthouse, April 2010

- Location within Pennsylvania Location within the United States
- Interactive map showing the location of Blair County Courthouse
- Location: 423 Allegheny St., Hollidaysburg, Pennsylvania
- Coordinates: 40°25′49″N 78°23′33″W
- Area: 0.5 acres (0.20 ha)
- Built: 1876, 1906
- Architect: Gendell, David S.
- Architectural style: Gothic Revival
- NRHP reference No.: 76001606
- Added to NRHP: June 17, 1976

Blair County Courthouse is a historic courthouse building located at Hollidaysburg, Blair County, Pennsylvania. It was built in 1875–1876, and is a T-shaped stone building in the Gothic Revival style. The entrance is flanked by two square, three-story towers with truncated pyramidal roofs. The building generally features elaborate stonework and a five-story clock tower topped by a tall stone spire. A three-story rear addition was built in 1906.

It was added to the National Register of Historic Places in 1976.

== See also ==
- List of state and county courthouses in Pennsylvania
