= Slinky =

Helical spring toy

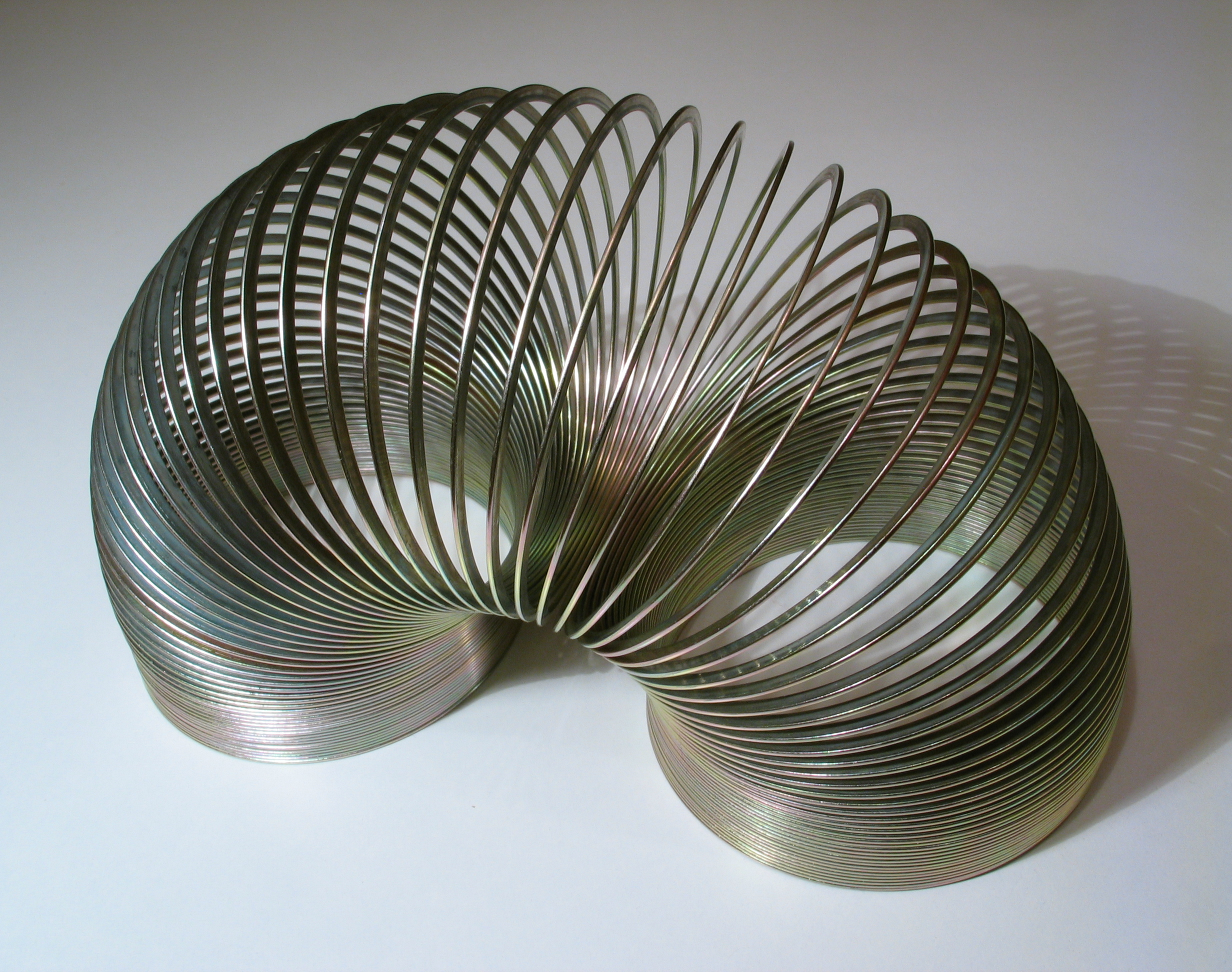
- A Slinky made out of metal
- Type: Spring toy
- Invented by: Richard T. James; Betty James
- Company: James Industries
- Country: United States
- Availability: 1945–present

The Slinky is a helical spring toy invented and developed by American naval engineer Richard T. James in 1943 and successfully demonstrated at Gimbels department store in Philadelphia on November 27, 1945.

It can perform a number of tricks, including travelling down a flight of steps end-over-end as it stretches and re-forms itself with the aid of gravity and its own momentum; and appearing to levitate for a period of time after it has been dropped. These interesting characteristics have contributed to its success in its home country of the United States, and it has inspired many popular toys with Slinky-like components, in a wide range of countries.

== History ==
=== Creation ===
In 1943, Richard T. James, a naval mechanical engineer, observed a spring "stepping" downward after being knocked off a shelf, then coming to rest in a vertical position. James's wife Betty later recalled, "He came home and said, 'I think if I got the right property of steel and the right tension, I could make it walk.'" James experimented with different types of steel wire over the next year, and finally found a spring that would "walk". Betty was skeptical, but changed her mind when the toy was fine-tuned and neighborhood children expressed an excited interest in it.

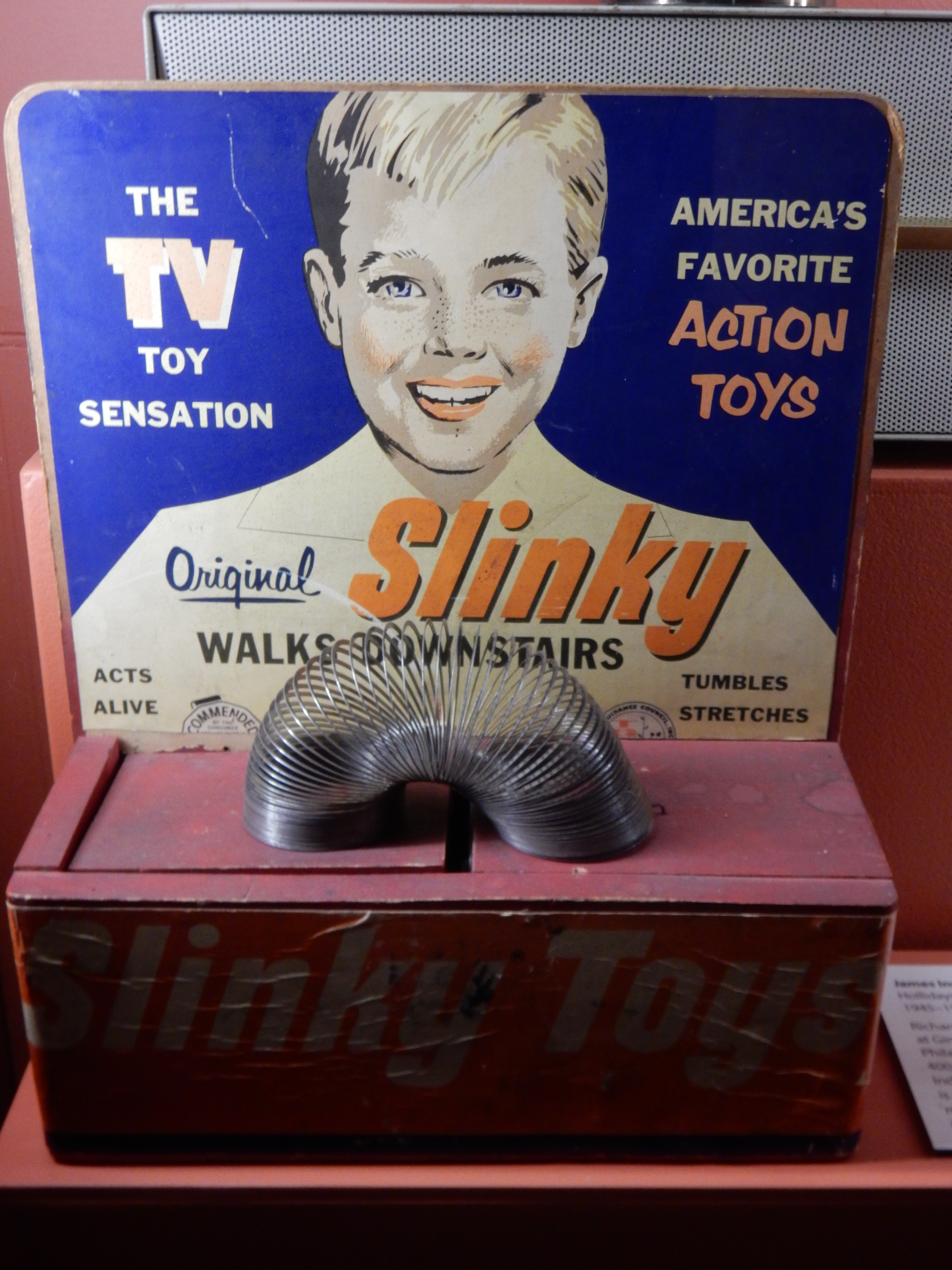
Original Slinky by James Industries. State Museum of Pennsylvania.

Richard and Betty formed James Industries and began manufacturing Slinkys in Clifton Heights, Pennsylvania, selling them for $1 each. They were 2 1/2 inches (64 mm) tall, and included 98 coils of high-grade blue-black Swedish steel. They initially had difficulty selling Slinky to toy stores, but in 1945, they were granted permission to set up an inclined plane in the toy section of Gimbels Department Store in Philadelphia to demonstrate it on the Tuesday after Thanksgiving. It was an instant hit; the first 400 units were sold in 90 minutes. In 1946, Slinky was introduced at the American Toy Fair.

Although the Slinky was originally priced at $1, many later paid much more, due to price increases for spring steel in Pennsylvania. It has, however, remained modestly priced throughout its history as a result of Betty James' concern about the toy's affordability for less affluent customers. In addition to its use as a toy, it has been used as a classroom teaching tool, and also as a portable and extendable radio antenna in the battlefield (particularly in the Vietnam War). It was inducted into the National Toy Hall of Fame at The Strong in Rochester, New York in 2000. In 2003, it was included in the Toy Industry Association's Century of Toys List. In its first 60 years, about 300 million Slinkys were sold.

=== Subsequent developments ===
Although the Slinky had early success, sales peaked in the late 1950s, then began to decline. Richard's interest in Slinky and the company waned, and he became deeply involved in a religious sect, reportedly giving it large amounts of company funds. In 1960, he told Betty that he was going to become an evangelical missionary in Bolivia with Wycliffe Bible Translators. Rather than going with him or selling the company, Betty decided to remain, divorce Richard, and take over the company. Richard relocated to Bolivia leaving Betty and their six children behind.

Betty James moved the company to Hollidaysburg, Pennsylvania in 1964 and the company grew under her direction. She attributed the toy's success to its "simplicity". The company was sold to Poof Products, Inc. in 1998. Slinky continued production in Hollidaysburg.

Betty James died of congestive heart failure in November 2008, at age 90, after serving as James Industries' president from 1960 to 1998.

In July 2012, Poof-Slinky, Inc. was acquired by the private equity firm Propel Equity Partners. In 2014, Propel Equity Partners consolidated Poof-Slinky and several other toy brands into Alex Brands.

In July 2020, the Slinky brand was sold to Just Play.

== Physical properties ==
The physical laws that govern the mechanics of a Slinky are Hooke's law and gravitation.

=== Period of oscillation ===
The oscillation of a vertically suspended Slinky has the periodic duration

$T = \sqrt{\frac{32 L}{g}} \, ,$

where $L$ is the length of the Slinky, and $g$ the acceleration due to gravity, approximately $g=9.81 \,\mathrm{m/s}^2$. The expression for $T$ is independent of the spring constant $k$ and the mass $m$ of the Slinky. For a spring pendulum one would expect such a dependence. This is because the dependence on $k$ and $m$ is hidden in the length $L(k,m)$:

$L(k,m) = \frac{mg}{2k} = \frac{W}{2k}$ (W is the weight).

This allows one to write:

$T = 4 \sqrt{\frac{m}{k}} \, .$

This expression differs from the ordinary spring pendulum

$T_{\mbox{spring pendulum}} = 2\pi \sqrt{\frac{m}{k}}$

because for the spring pendulum one assumes a massless spring with a mass $m$ attached at the bottom.

=== Operation ===
When set in motion on a stepped platform such as a stairway, the Slinky transfers energy along its length in a longitudinal wave. The whole spring descends end over end in a periodic motion as if it were "walking" down one step at a time.

When the top end of the Slinky is dropped, the energy of the tension change must propagate to the bottom end before both sides begin to fall; the top of an extended Slinky will drop while the bottom initially remains in its original position, compressing the spring. This creates a suspension time of ~0.3 s for an original Slinky, but has potential to create a much larger suspension time. A suspended Slinky's center of mass is accelerating downward at 1g (about 32 feet per second squared or 9.8 m/s^{2}); when released, the lower portion moves up toward the top portion with an equivalent, constant upward acceleration as the tension is relieved. As the spring contracts, every point along its length will accelerate downward with gravity and tension, and undergo a decrease in overall downward acceleration related to height along the spring due to the spring force changing with extension; at the bottom of the spring the upward initial acceleration reduces in accordance with Hooke's Law as the spring contracts, but the center toward which it is moving gets closer. Thus the base has been displaced sufficiently toward the center of inertial mass for it to appear to have hung still.

== Commercial history ==
=== Jingle ===
The jingle for the Slinky television commercial was created in Columbia, South Carolina in 1962 with Johnny McCullough and Homer Fesperman writing the music and Charles Weagly penning the lyrics. It became the longest-running jingle in advertising history.

The jingle has itself been parodied and referenced in popular culture. It is seen in the "Log" commercial on The Ren & Stimpy Show and sung by actor Jim Carrey in Ace Ventura: When Nature Calls. It is also referenced in the movie Lords of Dogtown, where it is sung in full by Emile Hirsch, and is sung by Eddie Murphy as part of the final routine in the stand-up comedy film Eddie Murphy Raw. It was also parodied in an ad for the Isuzu Amigo used as a promo for the vehicle's return in late March 1998, nearly two months before the ad was pulled due to criticism from the company that made the Slinky.

=== Slinky Dog ===
Early in the history of James Industries, Helen Herrick Malsed of Washington state sent the company a letter and drawings for developing Slinky pull-toys. The company liked her ideas, and Slinky Dog and Slinky Train were added to the company's product line. Slinky Dog, a small plastic dog whose front and rear ends were joined by a metal Slinky, debuted in 1952. Malsed received royalties of $60,000 to $70,000 annually for 17 years on her patent for the Slinky pull-toy idea, but never visited the plant.

In 1995, the Slinky Dog was redesigned for all of Pixar's Toy Story films, voiced by Jim Varney and Blake Clark. James Industries had discontinued their Slinky Dog a few years previously. Betty James approved of the new Slinky Dog, telling the press, "The earlier Slinky Dog wasn't nearly as cute as this one."

=== Plastic Slinky ===
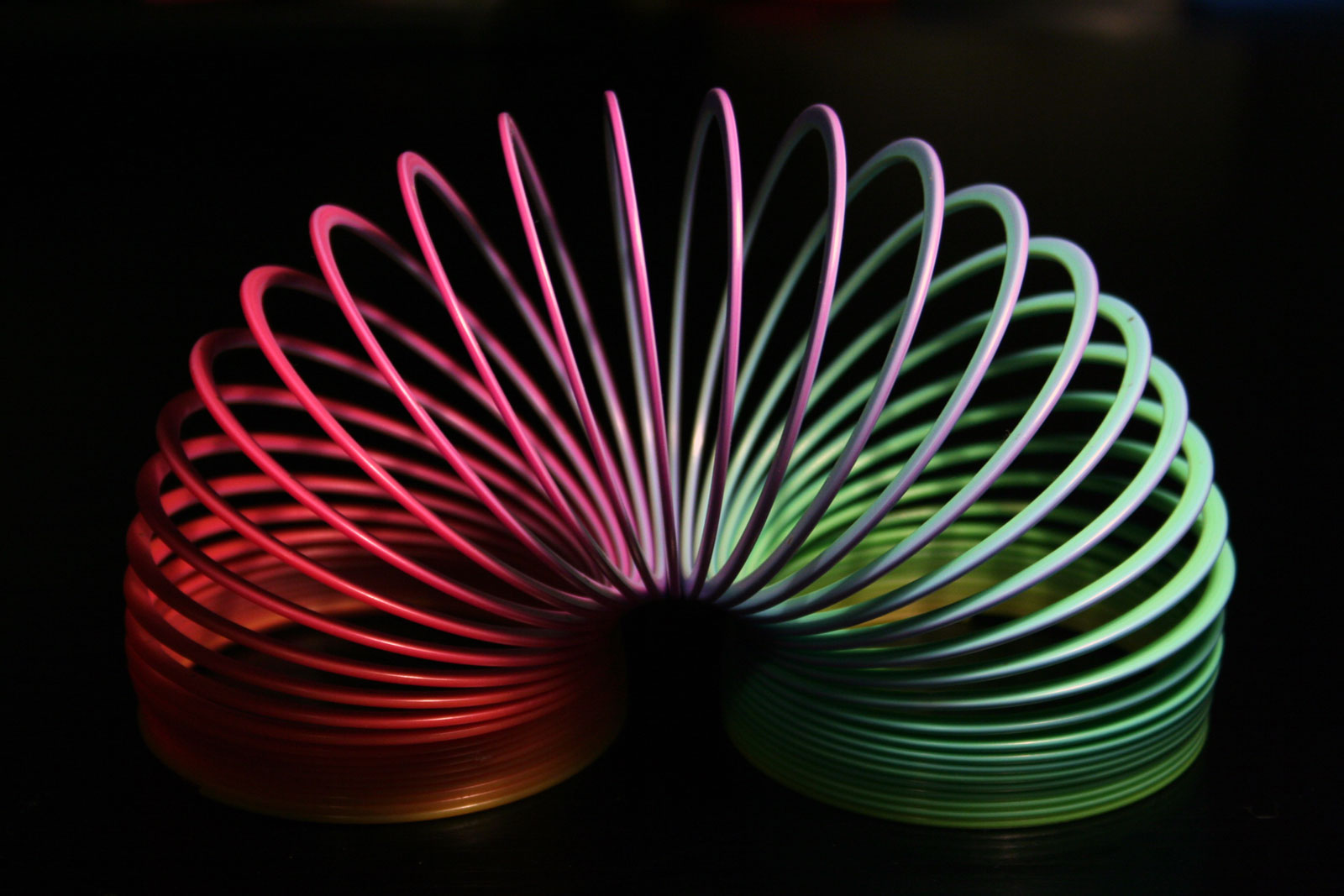
Rainbow colored plastic Slinky toy

Plastic Slinkys are also available. They can be made in different colors. Many of them are made with the colors of the rainbow in rainbow order. They were marketed in the 1970s as a safer alternative to metal Slinkys as they did not present a hazard when inserted into electrical sockets. The plastic spring toy, known as the Plastic Slinky, was invented by Donald James Reum of Avon Plastics in Albany, Minnesota. Reum came up with the idea as he was experimenting with different techniques to produce a spiral hose for watering plants. However, as it came off the assembly line, according to his children, it looked more like a "Slinky". He worked at it until it came out perfectly and then went to Betty James with his prototype. Reum manufactured the Plastic Slinky for Betty James for several years. Eventually Betty James decided to manufacture the product exclusively through James manufacturing, effectively ending the production of the toy by the small Minnesota company. Reum's patent number, 4120929 was filed on December 28, 1976, and issued by the U.S. Patent Office on October 17, 1978.

== Awards and honors ==
In 1999, the United States Postal Service issued a Slinky postage stamp. The Slinky was inducted into the National Toy Hall of Fame in 2000 in their Celebrate the Century stamp series. A bill to nominate the Slinky as the state toy of Pennsylvania was introduced by Richard Geist in 2001 but not enacted. The same year, Betty James was inducted into the Toy Industry Association's Hall of Fame. In 2003, Slinky was named to the Toy Industry Association's "Century of Toys List" of the 20th century's 100 most memorable and creative toys.

== Other uses ==
Slinkys and similar springs can be used to create a 'laser gun' like sound effect. This is done by holding up a Slinky in the air and striking one end, causing a metallic sound that sharply lowers in pitch. The effect can be amplified by attaching a plastic cup to one end of the Slinky.

The Helixophone is the name composer and artist Sonia Paço-Rocchia gave to a musical instrument made with a Slinky and a resonator. Hélix is a sound installation with up to 20 Helixophones, automated and playing an interactive sound composition.

Metal Slinkys can be used as an antenna; it resonates between 7 and 8 MHz. During the Vietnam War, it was used as a portable antenna for local HF communication. This setup had many advantages over a long wire shot from M79 grenade launcher: small dimensions, fast and quiet installation, reusability, good takeoff angle for local communication, and adequate performance. It was also used to extend the ranges of handheld radios.

In 1985, in conjunction with the Johnson Space Center and the Houston Museum of Natural Science, Space Shuttle Discovery astronauts created a video demonstrating how familiar toys behaved in space. One astronaut described the toy as "sort of droop[ing]". The video was prepared to stimulate interest in school children about the basic principles of physics and the phenomenon of weightlessness.

Several online videos have shown that a Slinky can be mounted on the pole of a bird feeder to deter squirrels from climbing up the pole.

== See also ==
- Spring (device) § Classification
