= National Register of Historic Places listings in Blair County, Pennsylvania =

Location of Blair County in Pennsylvania

This is a list of the National Register of Historic Places listings in Blair County, Pennsylvania.

This is intended to be a complete list of the properties and districts on the National Register of Historic Places in Blair County, Pennsylvania, United States. The locations of National Register properties and districts for which the latitude and longitude coordinates are included below, may be seen in a map.

There are 30 properties and districts listed on the National Register in the county. Two sites are further designated as National Historic Landmarks and another is designated a National Historic Site.

This National Park Service list is complete through NPS recent listings posted August 28, 2026.

== Current listings ==
	Name on the Register	Image	Date listed	Location	Municipality	Description
1	Allegheny Furnace	Allegheny Furnace	September 6, 1991 (#91001131)	3400 Crescent Road; 40°29′32″N 78°24′26″W	Altoona	
2	Allegheny Portage Railroad National Historic Site	Allegheny Portage Railroad National Historic Site	October 15, 1966 (#66000648)	U.S. Route 22; 40°27′15″N 78°32′25″W	Allegheny Township	Extends into Conemaugh and Cresson Townships in Cambria County
3	Altoona Armory	Altoona Armory	May 9, 1991 (#91000507)	327 Frankstown Road; 40°28′53″N 78°23′50″W	Logan Township	
4	Baker Mansion	Baker Mansion	June 5, 1975 (#75001619)	3500 Baker Boulevard; 40°29′26″N 78°24′30″W	Altoona	
5	Birmingham Bridge	Birmingham Bridge	March 20, 1990 (#90000400)	Over the Juniata River, north of Birmingham off Pennsylvania Route 350; 40°38′56″N 78°11′57″W	Tyrone Township	Extends into Warriors Mark Township in Huntingdon County
6	Blair County Courthouse	Blair County Courthouse	June 17, 1976 (#76001606)	423 Allegheny Street; 40°25′49″N 78°23′33″W	Hollidaysburg	
7	Broad Avenue Historic District	Broad Avenue Historic District	July 25, 2002 (#02000806)	Roughly along Broad Avenue, from 23rd to 31st Streets; 40°30′08″N 78°24′46″W	Altoona	
8	Central Trust Company Buildings	Central Trust Company Buildings	November 1, 1984 (#84000271)	1210–1218 11th Avenue; 40°30′55″N 78°24′06″W	Altoona	
9	Chimney Rocks		May 14, 2021 (#100006540)	Chimney Rocks Park (Chimney Rocks Rd.); 40°25′04″N 78°23′19″W	Hollidaysburg	
10	Downtown Altoona Historic District	Downtown Altoona Historic District	July 24, 1992 (#92000946)	Roughly bounded by 11th Avenue, 11th Street, 15th Avenue and 13th Street, also 700–1000 Lexington and 900–1000 Howard Avenues; 40°30′59″N 78°24′08″W	Altoona	Second set of boundaries represents a boundary increase of August 20, 2004
11	Etna Furnace	Etna Furnace	April 11, 1973 (#73001593)	North of Williamsburg: roughly the area south and east of the bend of the Frankstown Branch Juniata River at Mount Etna; 40°31′34″N 78°11′11″W	Catharine Township	Specific boundaries represent a boundary increase of September 6, 1991
12	Fort Roberdeau	Fort Roberdeau	May 29, 1974 (#74001753)	West of Culp off U.S. Route 220; 40°34′57″N 78°16′26″W	Tyrone Township	
13	Highland Hall	Highland Hall	September 13, 1978 (#78002351)	517 Walnut Street; 40°25′55″N 78°23′32″W	Hollidaysburg	
14	Hollidaysburg Historic District	Hollidaysburg Historic District	December 26, 1985 (#85003158)	Roughly bounded by Spruce, Bella, Blair, and Juniata Streets; 40°25′48″N 78°23′29″W	Hollidaysburg	
15	Horseshoe Curve	Horseshoe Curve	November 13, 1966 (#66000647)	5 miles (8 km) west of Altoona on the Blair County Veterans Memorial Highway (SR 4008); 40°29′52″N 78°29′03″W	Logan Township	
16	Jacob Isett House and Store	Jacob Isett House and Store	March 28, 1997 (#97000290)	Legislative Route 1013, 0.3 miles (0.5 km) south of junction with Legislative Route 1015; 40°36′16″N 78°12′25″W	Tyrone Township	
17	Jaffa Mosque	Jaffa Mosque	August 15, 2025 (#100012143)	2200 Broad Avenue; 40°30′23″N 78°24′31″W	Altoona	
18	D.S. Keith Junior High School	D.S. Keith Junior High School	December 11, 2011 (#11000922)	1318 19th Avenue; 40°31′11″N 78°24′32″W	Altoona	Part of the Educational Resources of Pennsylvania MPS
19	Knickerbocker Historic District	Knickerbocker Historic District	February 20, 2002 (#02000064)	4th, 5th and 6th Avenues, Burgoon Road, 40th and 41st Streets; 40°29′11″N 78°24′50″W	Altoona	
20	Leap-the-Dips	Leap-the-Dips	March 15, 1991 (#91000229)	700 Park Avenue, Lakemont Park; 40°28′15″N 78°23′48″W	Altoona	
21	Llyswen Historic District	Llyswen Historic District	July 25, 2002 (#02000807)	Coleridge, Logan, Aldrich bounded by Mill Run and Ward; 40°28′59″N 78°24′25″W	Altoona	
22	Mishler Theatre	Mishler Theatre	April 11, 1973 (#73001592)	1208 12th Avenue; 40°30′59″N 78°24′07″W	Altoona	
23	J.L. Noble School	J.L. Noble School	July 11, 1996 (#96000712)	209 12th Avenue, Juniata; 40°32′16″N 78°23′35″W	Altoona	
24	Penn Alto Hotel	Penn Alto Hotel	May 5, 1989 (#89000350)	12th Street and 13th Avenue; 40°31′01″N 78°24′09″W	Altoona	
25	Roaring Spring Historic District	Roaring Spring Historic District	March 3, 1995 (#95000133)	Roughly bounded by Barley, Lower, Walnut, Roosevelt, California, Hickory, Fairview, Sugar and North Main Streets; 40°20′05″N 78°23′56″W	Roaring Spring	
26	Daniel Royer House	Daniel Royer House	November 3, 1975 (#75001620)	5 miles (8.0 km) southwest of Williamsburg on Pennsylvania Route 866; 40°25′25″N 78°16′13″W	Woodbury Township	
27	St. John's Evangelical Lutheran Church	St. John's Evangelical Lutheran Church	September 18, 1978 (#78002350)	Sinking Valley on Old Water Street Road Northeast of Culp; 40°35′39″N 78°15′01″W	Tyrone Township	
28	Tyrone Armory	Tyrone Armory	December 22, 1989 (#89002083)	956 South Logan Avenue; 40°40′11″N 78°14′25″W	Tyrone	
29	Tyrone Borough Historic District	Tyrone Borough Historic District	January 21, 1993 (#92001823)	Roughly bounded by West 14th Street, Logan Avenue, Bald Eagle Avenue, the Little Juniata River, West 8th Street and Jefferson Avenue; 40°40′19″N 78°14′26″W	Tyrone	
30	Williamsburg Historic District	Williamsburg Historic District	May 12, 1995 (#95000518)	Approximately 30 square blocks centered around Second and High Streets; 40°27′39″N 78°12′14″W	Williamsburg	

== Former listings ==
	Name on the Register	Image	Date listed	Date removed	Location	City or town	Description
1	Charles B. Dudley House		May 11, 1976 (#76001605)	January 3, 2001	802 Lexington Avenue	Altoona	Demolished in late 1999.

== See also ==
- List of Pennsylvania state historical markers in Blair County
