= List of Pennsylvania state historical markers in Blair County =

Location of Blair County in Pennsylvania

This is a list of the Pennsylvania state historical markers in Blair County.

This is intended to be a complete list of the official state historical markers placed in Blair County, Pennsylvania by the Pennsylvania Historical and Museum Commission (PHMC). The locations of the historical markers, as well as the latitude and longitude coordinates as provided by the PHMC's database, are included below when available. There are 27 historical markers located in Blair County.

== Historical markers ==
Marker title	Image	Date dedicated	Location	Marker type	Topics
Allegheny Furnace		April 1, 1947	Pa. 36 (Union Ave.) S of 31st St., Altoona; 40.49207°N 78.40655°W	Roadside	Business & Industry, Furnaces, Iron
Altoona		April 1, 1947	Logan Blvd., leading into Altoona; 40.47846°N 78.40379°W	Roadside	Cities & Towns, Government & Politics, Government & Politics 19th Century, Railroads
Altoona Conference		May 28, 1948	U.S. 22 between Hollidaysburg and Duncansville (Missing)	Roadside	Abraham Lincoln, African American, Government & Politics, Government & Politics 19th Century
Baker Mansion		April 1, 1947	Pa. 36 (Union Ave.) at Mansion Blvd., Altoona; 40.48792°N 78.40499°W	Roadside	Buildings, Iron, Mansions & Manors
Baker Mansion		n/a	Baker Blvd. and Mansion Ave., Altoona; 40.48901°N 78.40804°W	City	Buildings, Iron, Mansions & Manors
Blair County		April 13, 1982	Courthouse, 423 Allegheny St., Hollidaysburg; 40.43007°N 78.39243°W	City	Government & Politics, Government & Politics 19th Century, Railroads
Blair Homestead		April 1, 1947	Twp. Road (old William Penn Hwy.), 1.6 miles W of Duncansville; 40.41455°N 78.46279°W	Roadside	Government & Politics, Government & Politics 18th Century, Houses & Homesteads
Blair Homestead		May 28, 1948	SR 3012 (old U.S. 22), 1.4 miles W of Duncansville (MISSING); 40.41454°N 78.41454°W	Roadside	Government & Politics, Government & Politics 18th Century, Houses & Homesteads
Canal Basin		May 31, 1982	U.S. 22 at Canal Basin Park, W end of Hollidaysburg; 40.42782°N 78.39646°W	Roadside	Canals, Navigation, Railroads, Transportation
Daniel Hale Williams		May 6, 1989	U.S. 22 eastbound (Blair St., 300 block), Hollidaysburg; 40.42802°N 78.39221°W	City	African American, Medicine & Science, Professions & Vocations
Etna Furnace		August 1, 1961	Int. of Etna Furnace Rd, TR 463 and Wm. Penn Hwy. (Missing); 40.52575°N 78.19975°W	Roadside	Business & Industry, Furnaces, Iron
Fort Roberdeau		April 1947	On Skelp Mountain Rd., off I-99 (US 220), E of Bellwood exit	Roadside	American Revolution, Forts, Military
Fort Roberdeau		April 1, 1947	at site - Kettle Road (SR 1013), 1 mile SW of Culp (Missing); 40.57526°N 78.26807°W	Roadside	American Revolution, Forts, Military
Frankstown		April 1, 1947	US 22, .6 mile E of Hollidaysburg, and SW of Frankstown; 40.43288°N 78.36651°W	Roadside	Cities & Towns, Native American, Paths & Trails
Fred Waring (1900 - 1984)		October 6, 2005	SE corner of Pennsylvania Ave. & 11th St., Tyrone	City	Music & Theater, Performers
Gallitzin Spring		April 1, 1947	SR 3012 eastbound (old U.S. 22) 1 mile E of Cresson; 40.44576°N 78.52648°W	Roadside	Early Settlement, Religion
Gallitzin Spring		May 28, 1948	SR 3012 westbound (old U.S. 22) 1 mile E of Cresson; 40.44576°N 78.52648°W	Roadside	Early Settlement, Religion
Harold L. Ickes		September 26, 1994	Altoona Area High School, 1415 Sixth Ave., Altoona; 40.50962°N 78.39862°W	City	Civil Rights, Environment, Government & Politics, Government & Politics 20th Century
Isaac Charles Mishler		May 4, 2003	1208 Twelfth Ave. at Mishler Theater, Altoona; 40.51616°N 78.4022°W	City	Business & Industry, Music & Theater
Juniata Iron		April 1, 1947	SR 3012 (old U.S. 22), 2 miles W of Duncansville (Missing)	Roadside	Coal, Iron
Juniata Iron		April 1, 1947	SR 3012 (old U.S. 22), 2 miles W of Duncansville (Missing)	Roadside	Environment
Leap-The-Dips Roller Coaster		November 28, 2000	Lakemont Park 700 Park Ave., Altoona; 40.47081°N 78.39357°W	City	Sports
Logan House		April 1, 1947	11th Ave. at 13th St., Altoona; 40.51502°N 78.40168°W	Roadside	Abraham Lincoln, African American, Business & Industry, Government & Politics, Government & Politics 19th Century, Governors, Inns & Taverns
Lowry Homestead		April 1, 1947	U.S. 22, 1.1 miles E of Hollidaysburg (Missing)	Roadside	Buildings, Houses & Homesteads, Native American, Paths & Trails
Pennsylvania Railroad Shops		October 5, 1996	9th Ave. at 13th St., Altoona; 40.51321°N 78.39985°W	City	Business & Industry, Railroads, Transportation
Portage Railroad		April 1, 1947	(SR 3012 / old US 22) westbound, just E of Cambria Co. line 40.45331°N 78.5429°W	Roadside	Canals, Railroads, Transportation
Portage Railroad		April 1, 1947	(SR 3012 / old US 22) eastbound, just E of Cambria Co. line	Roadside	Canals, Railroads, Transportation

== See also ==
- List of Pennsylvania state historical markers
- National Register of Historic Places listings in Blair County, Pennsylvania
