= Roberdeau =

Roberdeau is a surname. Notable people with the surname include:

- Daniel Roberdeau (1727–1795), American Founding Father and merchant
- John Peter Roberdeau (1754–1815), English dramatist

== See also ==
- Chatham Roberdeau Wheat (1826–1862), American military officer
