= Culp, Pennsylvania =

Unincorporated community in Pennsylvania, US

Coordinates: 40°34′51″N 78°15′35″W

Culp is an unincorporated community and census-designated place located in Tyrone Township, Blair County, Pennsylvania, United States. It is located on Kettle Road (Route 1013) at the intersection with Golf Course Road (Route 1015).

Culp is less than one mile to the east of historic Fort Roberdeau, and approximately 2.5 miles southwest of Tytoona Cave. It is located in Sinking Valley and is near Skelp, another small unincorporated community. Sinking Run flows through Culp.

== Education ==
The school district is the Tyrone Area School District.
