= Tytoona Cave =

Cave in Pennsylvania, United States

Coordinates: 40.6059°N 78.2044°W

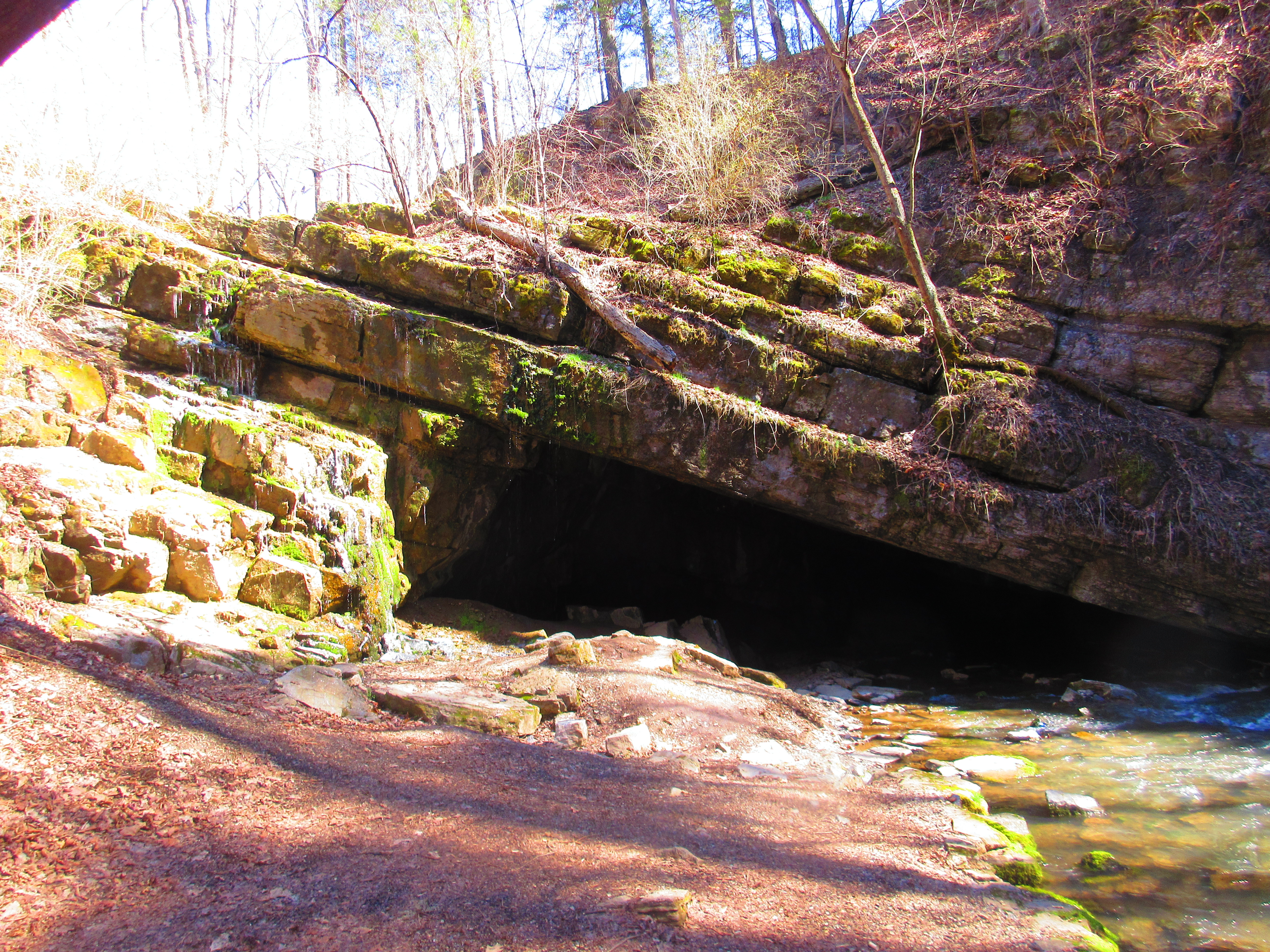
- Interactive map of Tytoona Cave
- Location: Sinking Valley
- Length: 4,200 feet (1,300 m)
- Discovery: c.1750
- Entrances: 1
- Difficulty: via sinkhole
- Hazards: logjam partially obstructs cave
- Access: Private

Tytoona Cave is located approximately 1-mile (1.6 km) from Arch Springs, Pennsylvania in Sinking Valley, near Tyrone and Altoona, in the United States.

== History ==
Tytoona Cave (Previously known as Sinking Valley Cave and Arch Spring Cave) has a lengthy recorded history, dating back to the arrival of Europeans in the Sinking Valley area in the 1750s. Local folklore states that around this time, Bedford Rangers chased Native Americans who had killed two settlers into the cave. The Native Americans supposedly never emerged from the entrance where the Rangers waited, and it is said that they either died in the cave or found another way out. Since no passable way in or out (except the main entrance) has ever been found, the likely explanation is that the Rangers, afraid to enter the cave, did not wait very long.

The first published account of the Sinking Valley area was published in the Columbian Magazine in 1788 by William Spotswood. The account gives a history of Sinking Valley and nearby Fort Roberdeau, and mentions the end of the Tytoona system at Arch Spring:

"a rude arch of stone hanging over it, forms a passage for the water, which it throws out with some degree of violence, and in such plenty as to form a fine stream, which at length buries itself again in the bowels of the earth."

It also gives the first known description of the entrance to the cave:

"This opening in the hill continues about four hundred yards when the cave widens, after you have got round a sudden turn, which prevents its being discovered till you are within it, to a spacious room, at the bottom of which is a vortex, the water that falls into the whirling round with amazing force; sticks, or even pieces of timber, are immediately absorbed."

More recently, there have been two attempts at commercialization – in 1947 and in 1972 – neither venture lasted long, and today few traces remain. In 1972, the venture failed when Hurricane Agnes caused floods throughout the region; Tytoona, at that point called Indian River Caverns, was completely filled with water, and all the steps, railings, and pathways were washed away into the cave. The remains of this failure make up much of the logjam which lies in a bend in the cave, about 122 meters (400 feet) in.

A tragedy occurred in the cave on June 20, 1988. Cave divers John Schweyen and Roberta Swicegood were surveying and mapping the cave from the Arch Spring end, and they encountered two sumps. The second was extremely long and deep: about 305 meters (1000 feet) long and 32 meters (105 feet) deep underwater. After Schweyen left the cave, Swicegood went back in for a solo dive. When she did not return, several divers attempted to rescue her but were unsuccessful. Her body was recovered four days later. She had apparently lost her guideline in the second sump; with visibility near zero, she was unable to find the line again before her air supply ran out. In the aftermath of this tragedy, the Western Pennsylvania Conservancy (who owned the cave at that time) banned further cave diving indefinitely. Cave diving remains forbidden at Tytoona without express written permission from the Tytoona Cave Preserve management.

== General description ==
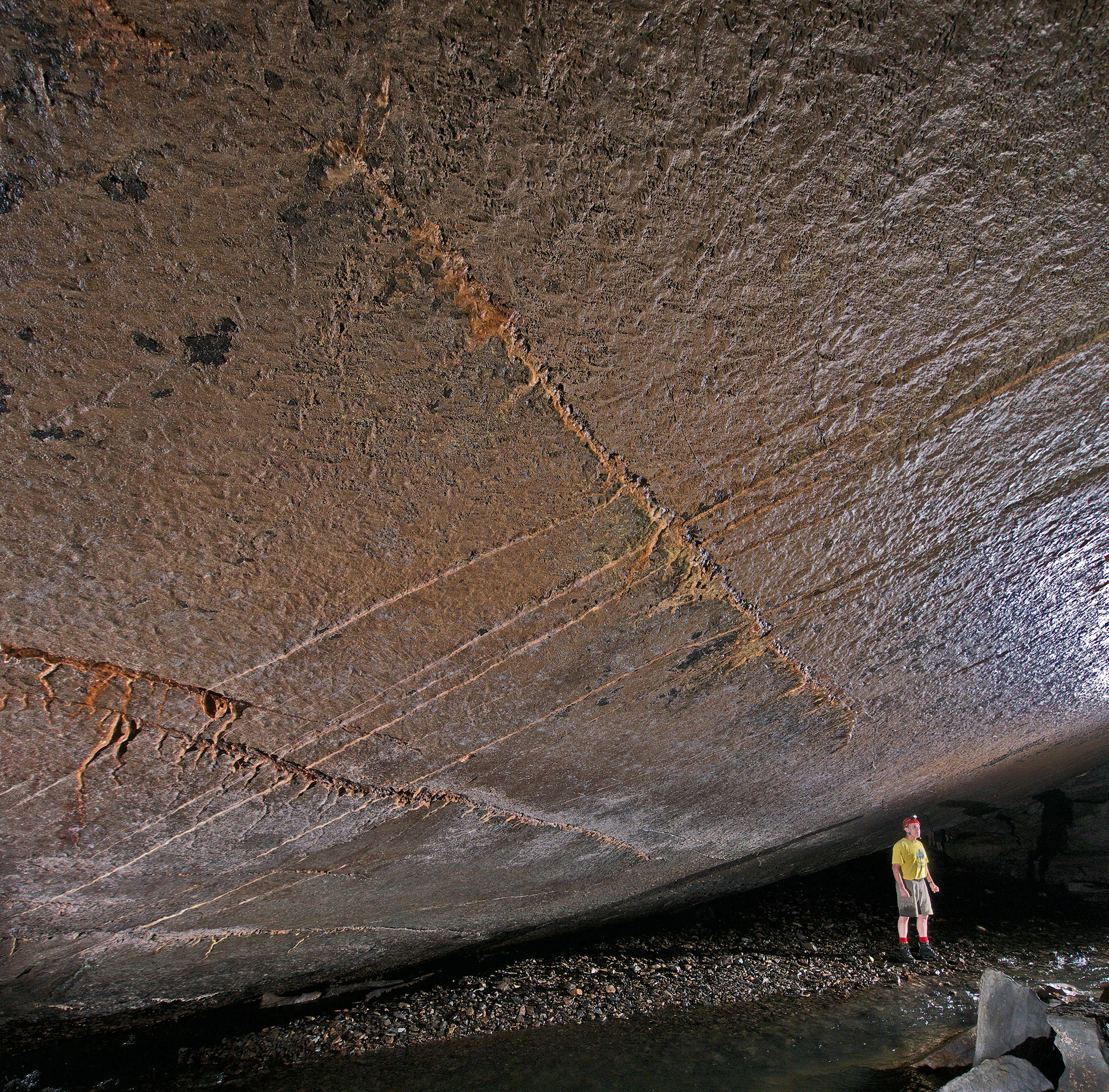
Passage in Tytoona cave showing the steep dip of the limestone. Some small draperies are present on the ceiling.

Tytoona Cave's entrance is located in an approximately 100-foot (30 m) deep sinkhole. A stream emerges from the base of a sheer wall of the sinkhole opposite the cave entrance. This stream flows about one hundred feet or so before entering the Tytoona cave entrance. An above-ground stream, Sinking Run, enters the sinkhole and joins the stream emerging from the cliff. The flow of the above-ground drainage is very dependent on the amount of recent rain; the flow of the stream emerging from the base of cliff also varies greatly. The entrance to the cave slopes from ground level on the left diagonally to a high point of about 12 feet on the right. In the cave, the stream bottom is fairly flat and rather wide (~25 feet). The stream bottom is covered with gravel. The cave has a clay-covered path over a rock shelf on the left-hand side, with several very short dead-end passages on the left.

The first few hundred feet of the cave can be explored by almost anyone; however, at about 400 feet in, a massive logjam almost completely blocks the passage. Up to this point, there are not many formations (such as flowstone, stalagmites/stalactites, soda straws, etc.) visible. Those familiar with the cave can bypass the logjam by walking in the stream, which passes through a gap beneath most of the logs. Past the logjam lies another 500-foot passage. A number of formations can be seen in this section, although some have been vandalized. Also, several decayed wooden beams can be seen, remnants of the early attempts at commercialization. The cave is walkable for about 900 feet total before a sump is encountered.

Past this sump lie several more rooms connected by sumps, the first of which contains magnificent formations and is apparently airtight - no matter how high the stream is, the rooms will never fill with water. However, the current owners of the cave have banned cave diving since the death of diver Roberta Swicegood in the cave in June 1988; even if diving was permitted, even a skilled cave diver likely could not pass the first sump, since debris has accumulated and visibility is close to zero.

Eventually, the stream connects with the nearby Arch Spring Cave, but underwater blockages and cave-ins prevent a complete trip through. The total length of the cave system, from the entrance to the exit at Arch Spring, is about 4,200-foot (1,300 m).

== Ownership ==
The cave and 6.8 acres (28,000 m^{2}) encompassing the sinkhole and cave entrance are owned by a private conservancy organization. This organization is composed of volunteers who monitor the condition of the cave, remove garbage and graffiti, conduct research, and work with the police to deter people from gathering at the cave to drink, use drugs, vandalize, etc. The exact location of the cave is not advertised, but the location is well known to locals and the public may explore the cave from 6:00-21:00 every day as long as the posted rules are followed.
