= Arch Spring, Pennsylvania =

Unincorporated community in Pennsylvania, US

Coordinates: 40°36′25″N 78°12′10″W

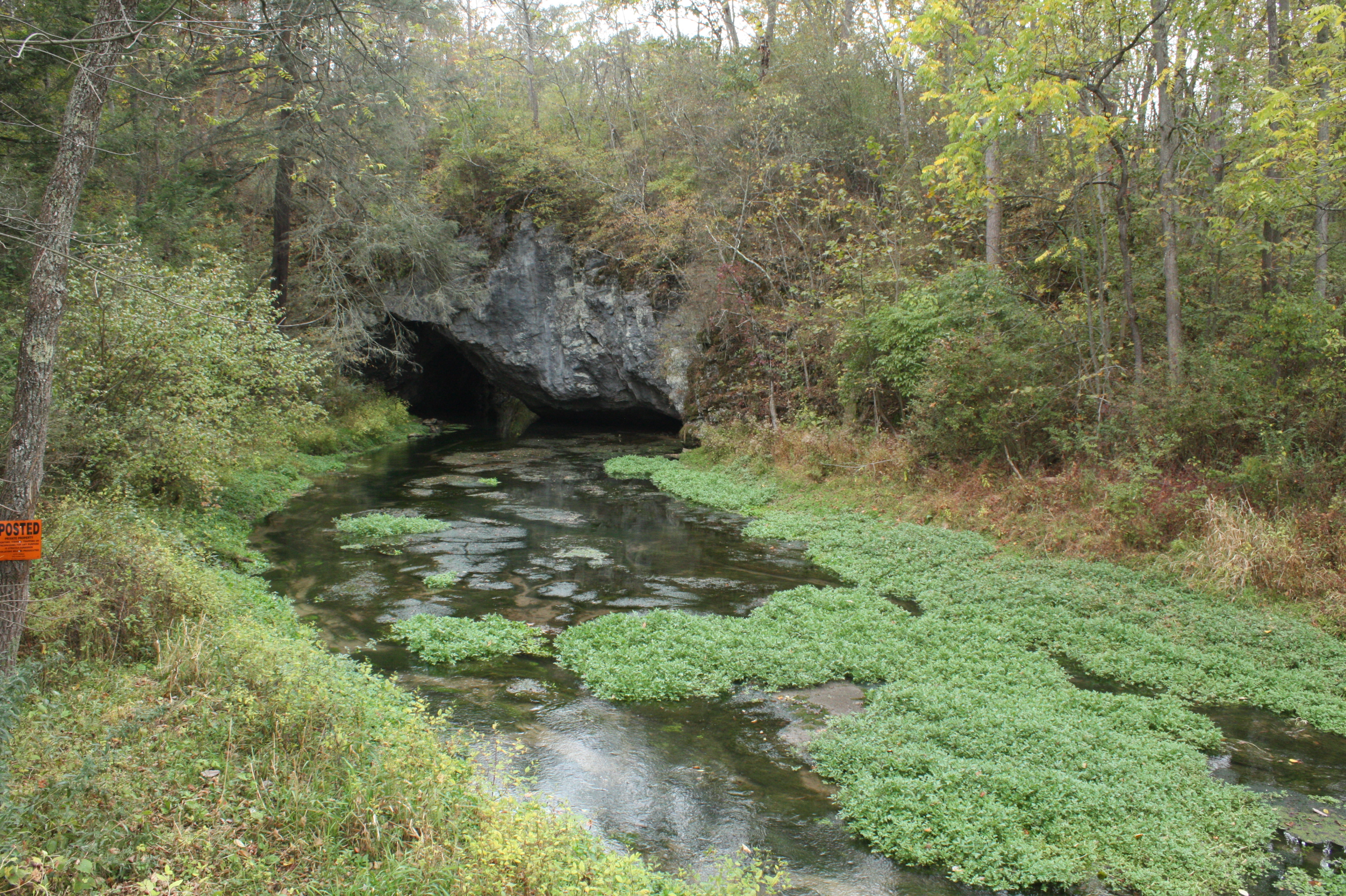
Arch Spring and Sinking Run in October 2017

Arch Spring is an unincorporated community located in Tyrone Township, Blair County, Pennsylvania. It is located on Kettle Road (Route 1013) approximately 0.3 miles to the south of Hileman Road (Route 1008). Sinking Run flows through the community, and the Arch Spring itself is located on the creek.

The town of Skelp is about 4 miles to the west on Hileman Road, and Culp is about 4 miles to the southwest on Kettle Road.
