= Canoe Mountain =

Mountain in Pennsylvania, United States

Highest point
- Elevation: 2,180 ft (660 m)
- Coordinates: 40°32′30″N 78°12′30″W

Geography
- Location: Blair County, Pennsylvania and Huntingdon County, Pennsylvania, U.S.
- Parent range: Appalachian Mountains
- Topo map(s): USGS Spruce Creek (PA) Quadrangle, Frankstown (PA) Quadrangle

Climbing
- First ascent: unknown

Canoe Mountain is a stratigraphic ridge in central Pennsylvania, United States, running east of the Allegheny Front and west of Tussey Mountain. It forms a continuous ridge with Brush Mountain to the west. To the south, across the water gap formed by the Frankstown Branch Juniata River, the ridgeline continues as Lock Mountain.

The northern part of Canoe Mountain forms the border between Blair County and Huntingdon County.

Pennsylvania State Game Lands Number 166 lies on Brush Mountain south of Sinking Hollow and on Canoe Mountain and the valley between.

== Geology ==
Canoe Mountain is in the western part of the Ridge and Valley province of the Appalachian Mountains. Tussey Mountain, to the east, is made up of Paleozoic rocks, consisting of Ordovician Bald Eagle Formation (sandstone), Juniata Formation (shale), and Silurian Tuscarora Formation (Quartzite) that were folded during the Appalachian orogeny in the Permian period, then eroded down to their present form.

The Tuscarora Quartzite is more resistant to erosion than the Bald Eagle Sandstone, and both are more resistant than the Juniata formation between them or the other formations stratigraphically above and below them. The two sandstones thus form a double ridge line with the harder Tuscarora at the crest.

Canoe Mountain and the southern spur of Brush Mountain form a syncline.
