= Skelp, Pennsylvania =

Unincorporated community in Pennsylvania, U.S.

Coordinates: 40°37′23″N 78°15′43″W

Skelp is an unincorporated community and Census-designated place located in Tyrone Township, Blair County, Pennsylvania, United States. It is located on Skelp Mountain Road (Route 1008) at the intersection with Hobbit Hollow Road, at the foot of Mt. Charma, a small section of Brush Mountain. It is located in Sinking Valley and is near Culp, another small unincorporated community. Elk Run flows through Skelp.

== Education ==
The school district is the Tyrone Area School District.
