= Tyrone Township, Blair County, Pennsylvania =

Township in Pennsylvania, US

Coordinates: 40°38′00″N 78°15′29″W

- Township
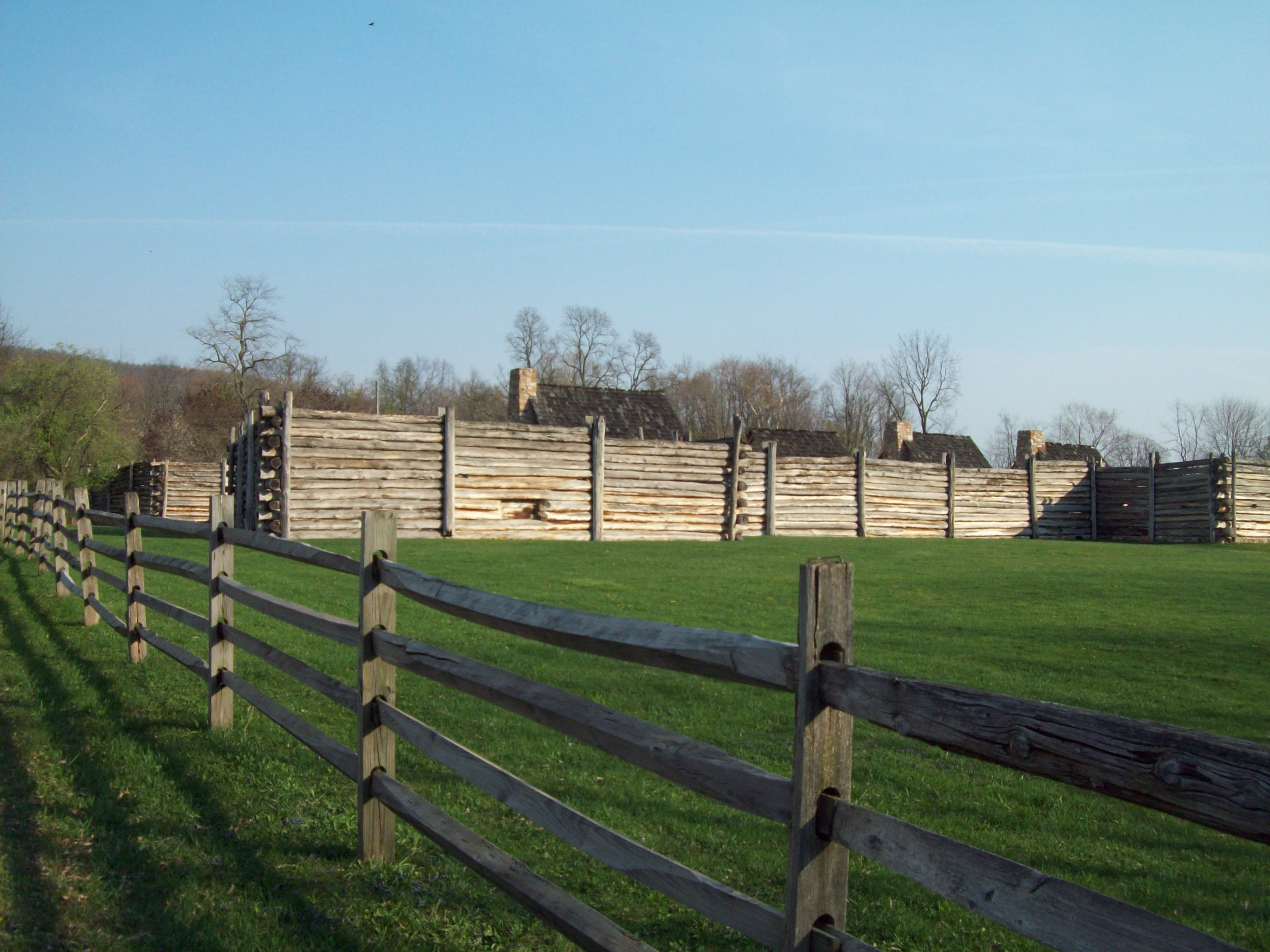
- Reconstruction of Fort Roberdeau

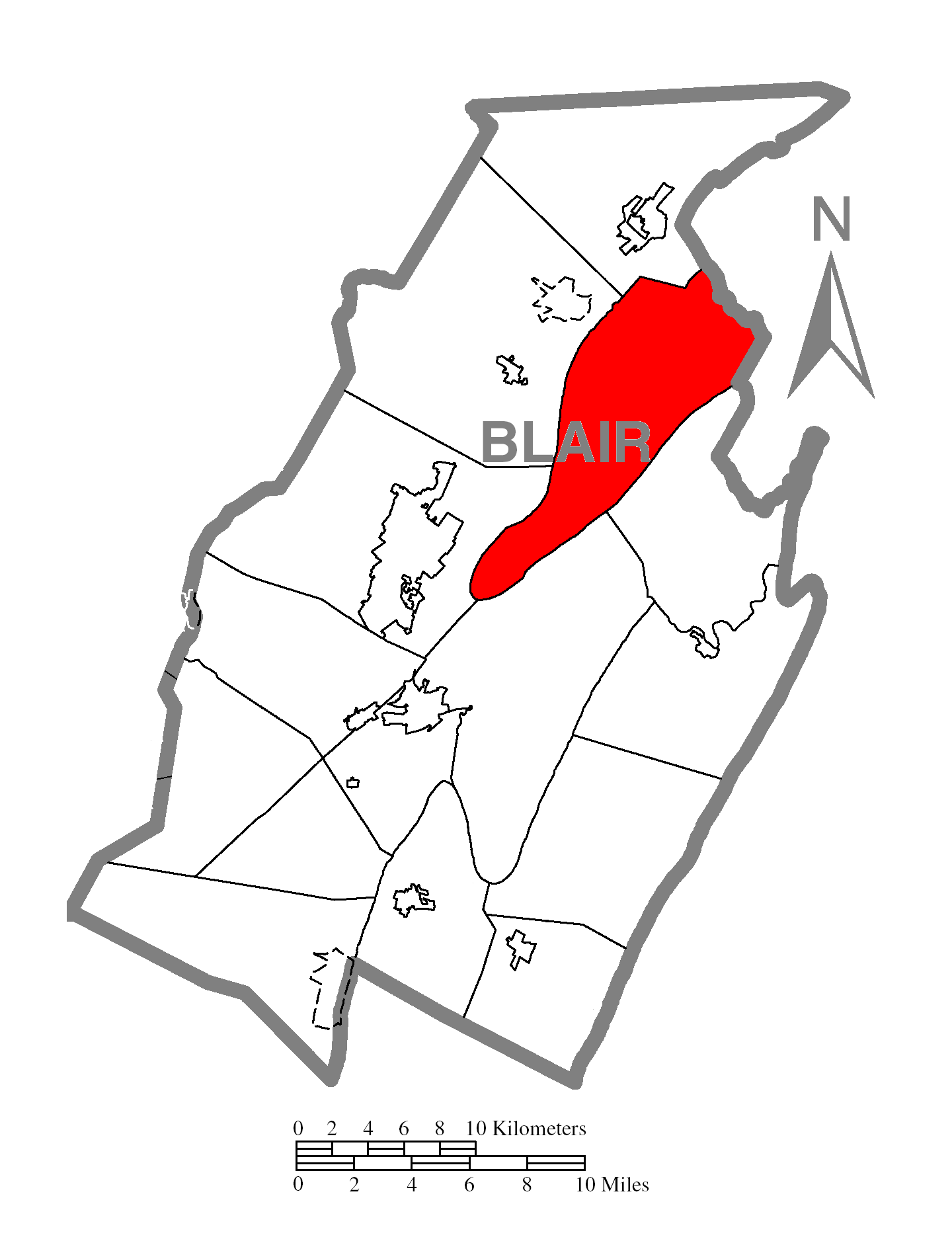
- Map of Blair County, Pennsylvania highlighting Tyrone Township

- Map of Blair County, Pennsylvania
- Country: United States
- State: Pennsylvania
- County: Blair
- Settled: 1775
- Incorporated: 1787

Government
  - Type: Board of Supervisors

Area
  - Total: 41.87 sq mi (108.43 km^{2})
  - Land: 41.82 sq mi (108.31 km^{2})
  - Water: 0.046 sq mi (0.12 km^{2})

Population (2020)
  - Total: 1,873 ▼
  - Estimate (2022): 1,833
  - Density: 45.2/sq mi (17.45/km^{2})
- Time zone: UTC-5 (Eastern (EST))
  - Summer (DST): UTC-4 (EDT)
- Area code: 814
- FIPS code: 42-013-78176
- Website: https://tyronetwp.com/

Tyrone Township is a township in Blair County, Pennsylvania, United States. It is part of the Altoona, PA Metropolitan Statistical Area. The population was 1,873 at the 2020 census.

It was named after County Tyrone in Ireland.

== General information ==
- ZIP codes: 16601, 16602, 16603, 16686
- Area code: 814
- Local telephone exchanges: 684, 686, 940, 941, 942, 943, 944, 946, 947, 949

== History ==
The Birmingham Bridge, Fort Roberdeau, Jacob Isett House and Store, and St. John's Evangelical Lutheran Church are listed on the National Register of Historic Places.

=== Tornado ===
Shortly after 11:00 a.m. EST on July 19, 1996, an F1 tornado touched down northeast of Altoona approximately 1 mile northwest of Sickles Corner on Brush Mountain. This tornado moved southeast taking down a swath of trees and causing minor damage to homes along a 1.5 mile path before ending one half mile southeast of Sickles Corner. The path width averaged about one half mile wide. This storm was the fourth in the family of tornadoes that had crossed Clarion, Jefferson, Indiana, Clearfield and Cambria counties.

== Geography ==
Tyrone Township is located in northern Blair County, south of the borough of Tyrone (itself surrounded by Snyder Township). The northeastern border of Tyrone Township is the Blair County–Huntingdon County line. The remainder of the township is bordered to the northwest and southeast by Brush Mountain, a nearly continuous mountain ridge that forms a sharp loop around the southwestern end of the township. The majority of the settled portion of the township is in Sinking Valley, between the two arms of the mountain.

According to the United States Census Bureau, Tyrone Township has a total area of 41.9 square miles (108.4 km^{2}), of which 41.8 square miles (108.3 km^{2}) is land and 0.04 square miles (0.1 km^{2}), or 0.11%, is water.

The township contains the hamlets of Skelp, Arch Spring, Culp, Sickles Corner, and Elberta.

== Demographics ==
Historical population
| Census | Pop. | Note | %± |
|---|---|---|---|
| 2010 | 1,885 | | — |
| 2020 | 1,873 | | −0.6% |
| 2022 (est.) | 1,833 | | −2.1% |
U.S. Decennial Census

As of the census of 2000, there were 1,800 people, 658 households, and 517 families residing in the township. The population density was 43.1 inhabitants per square mile (16.6/km^{2}). There were 719 housing units at an average density of 17.2/sq mi (6.6/km^{2}). The racial makeup of the township was 99.61% White, 0.22% Asian, 0.06% Pacific Islander, 0.11% from other races. Hispanic or Latino of any race were 0.39% of the population.

There were 658 households, out of which 33.7% had children under the age of 18 living with them, 69.0% were married couples living together, 5.8% had a female householder with no husband present, and 21.4% were non-families. 17.5% of all households were made up of individuals, and 5.9% had someone living alone who was 65 years of age or older. The average household size was 2.74 and the average family size was 3.12.

In the township the population was spread out, with 25.3% under the age of 18, 7.4% from 18 to 24, 27.9% from 25 to 44, 26.8% from 45 to 64, and 12.6% who were 65 years of age or older. The median age was 39 years. For every 100 females there were 99.6 males. For every 100 females age 18 and over, there were 103.5 males.

The median income for a household in the township was $38,155, and the median income for a family was $42,788. Males had a median income of $31,042 versus $23,625 for females. The per capita income for the township was $18,936. About 6.9% of families and 11.3% of the population were below the poverty line, including 21.1% of those under age 18 and 5.4% of those age 65 or over.

== Recreation ==
A small portion of Pennsylvania State Game Lands Number 166 is located on Brush Mountain.
