= John Peter Roberdeau =

English dramatist

- Born: 1754; London, England
- Died: 7 January 1815 (aged 60–61); Chelsea, London, England
- Occupation: Dramatist

John Peter Roberdeau (1754 – 7 January 1815) was an English dramatist.

== Biography ==
Roberdeau was the son of a silk manufacturer in Spitalfields. He was born in London in 1754. He was collaterally descended from Isaac Roberdeau (died 1742), Huguenot refugee from Rochelle, who settled in St. Christopher's. The latter, by his wife, Mary Conyngham, of an old Scottish family, was father of General Daniel Roberdeau, who distinguished himself on the American side in the war of independence, and founded the American family of Roberdeau (see Buchanan, Genealogy of Roberdeau Family, Washington, 1876). John Peter Roberdeau gained a competence by trade, and, settling at Chichester about 1796, devoted himself to literary pursuits. From 1796 to 1799 he acted as resident commissary of army stores in Surrey and Sussex. He wrote many plays, of which the first, entitled "The Point of Honour," was accepted at Covent Garden in 1792, Joseph Shepherd Munden and John Fawcett being in the cast, but was apparently never acted, though it was a fairly amusing comedietta, based largely upon William Kenrick's "Duellist." His most ambitious effort was "Thermopylæ, or Repulsed Invasion," a tragic drama, in three acts and in verse, based upon Richard Glover's "Leonidas." It was written in 1792, and played at Gosport, but rejected by the London houses (printed in New British Theatre, 1814, ii. 258). Another play, "Cornelia, or a Roman Matron's Jewels," was performed at Southampton, Chichester, and Portsmouth "with applause" (printed in The Spirit of the Public Journals, 1810, vol. xiii. 12mo). Some minor pieces are enumerated by Baker (Biogr. Dram. i. 602). Roberdeau also wrote ‘Fugitive Verse and Prose, consisting of Poems Lyric, Obituary, Dramatic, Satiric, and Miscellaneous," Chichester, 1803, dedicated to Francis Rawdon-Hastings, second earl of Moira, and consisting of trifles, often neatly turned, upon topics of the day. Roberdeau moved to Bath about 1800, and thence to Chelsea, where he died on 7 January 1815. By his wife Elizabeth (died 4 June 1809), daughter of James Townley, high master of Merchant Taylors' School, he had a large family; three of his sons held posts in the service of the East India Company. The eldest, Henry Townley, a youth who showed great promise both in his official work and in some ‘Essays’ upon Indian subjects, died at Mymensing in Bengal on 28 April 1808 (Gent. Mag. 1808, ii. 1126). The second son, John Thomas, judge at Allahabad, upon the Bengal civil establishment, died at Ryde on 19 November 1818.
