= Tyrone Borough Historic District =

Historic district in Pennsylvania, United States

- U.S. National Register of Historic Places
- U.S. Historic district
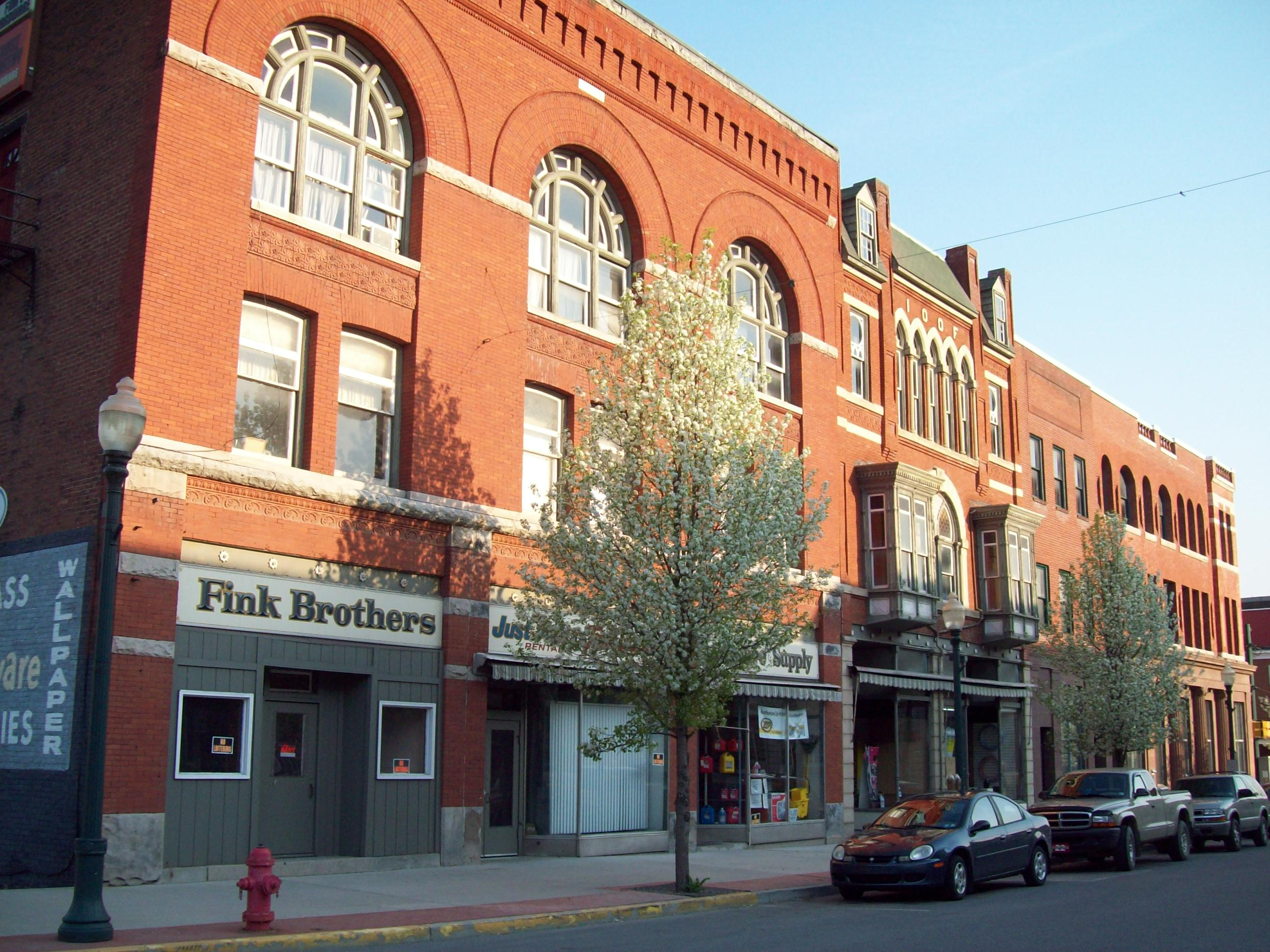
- Tyrone Borough Historic District, April 2010

- Location within Pennsylvania Location within the United States
- Location: Roughly bounded by W. 14th St., Logan Ave., Bald Eagle Ave., the Little Juniata R., W. 8th St. and Jefferson Ave., Tyrone, Pennsylvania
- Coordinates: 40°40′19″N 78°14′26″W
- Area: 119 acres (48 ha)
- Architect: Multiple
- Architectural style: Late 19th And 20th Century Revivals, Late Victorian
- NRHP reference No.: 92001823
- Added to NRHP: January 21, 1993

The Tyrone Borough Historic District is a national historic district that is located in Tyrone, Blair County, Pennsylvania.

It was added to the National Register of Historic Places in 1993.

== History and architectural features ==
This district includes 349 contributing buildings and two contributing structures that are located in the central business district and surrounding residential areas of Tyrone. The earliest buildings date to the 1850s, when the community was expanded as a junction town for the Pennsylvania Railroad. The buildings are primarily frame and brick, with notable examples of Late Victorian-style architecture.

Notable non-residential buildings include the Garman Building (1890), the Hiller Building (1892), the I.O.O.F Building, the Jones Building (1906), the White House Bed and Breakfast (1855), and St. Matthews Catholic Church (1880). Also located in the district are a railroad bed and viaduct (c. 1900) and road bridge at East 10th Street and Blair Avenue (c. 1900). Also located in the district but listed separately is the Tyrone Armory.

== Gallery ==
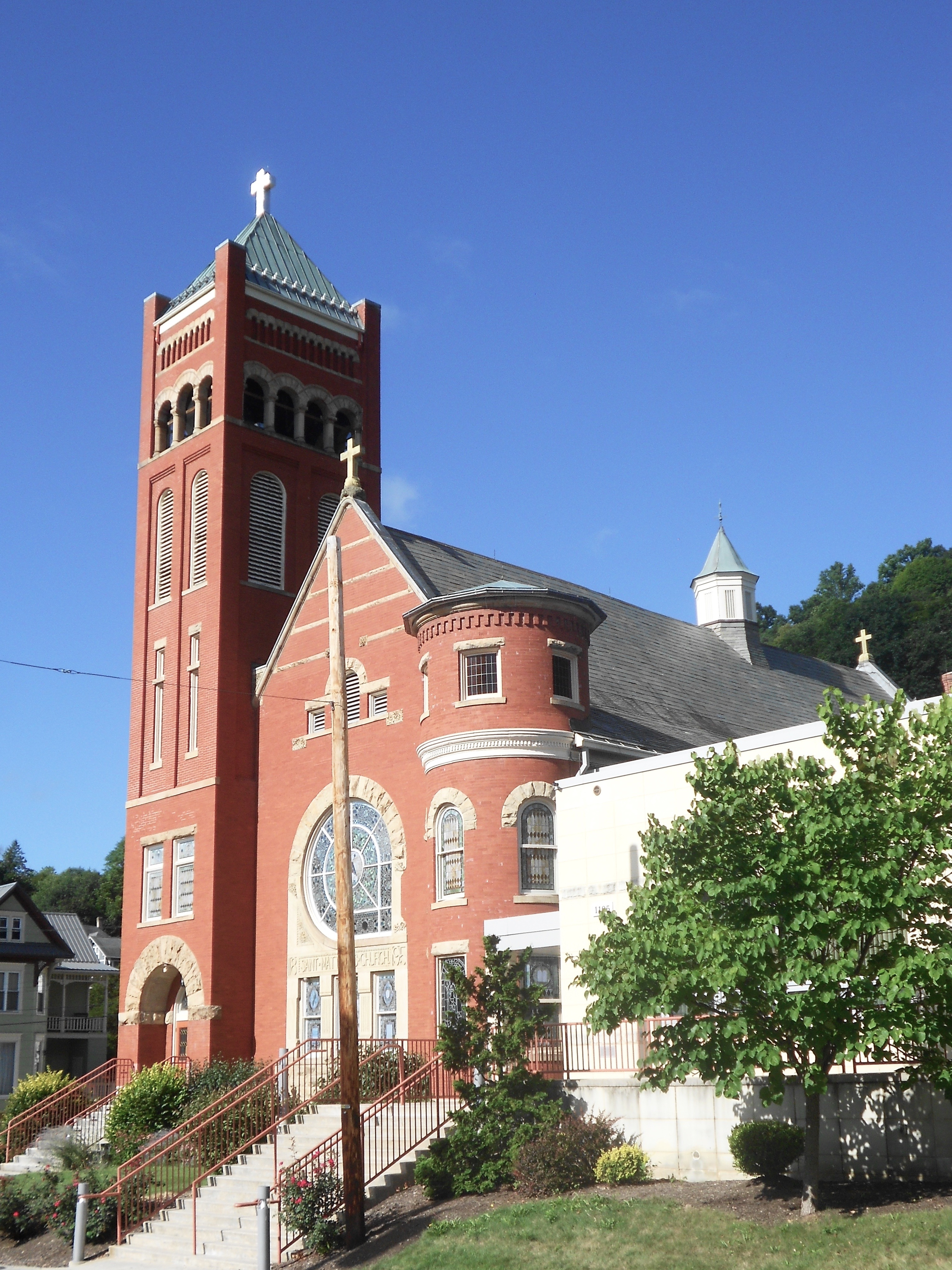
St. Matthews

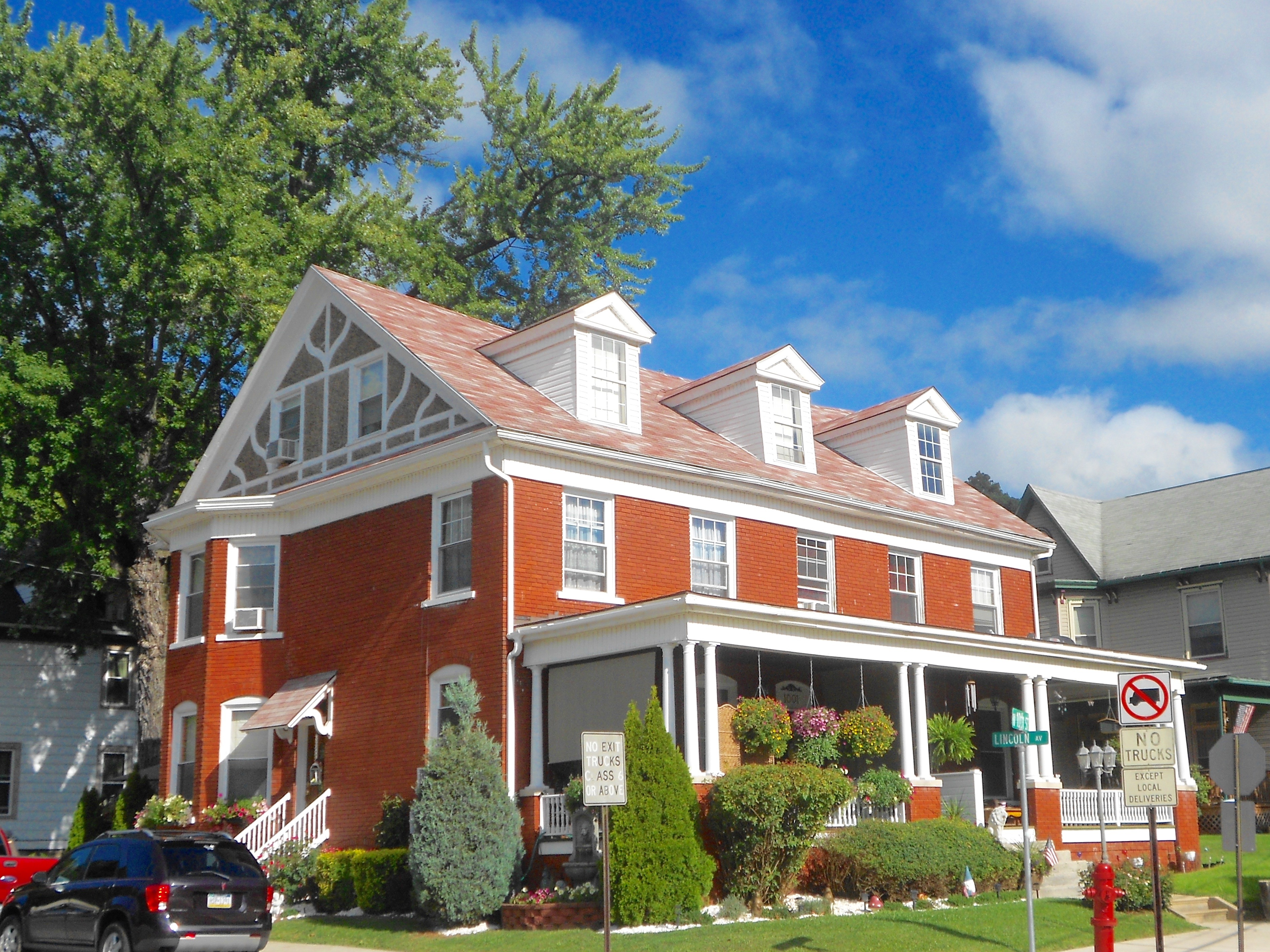
House at 10th and Lincoln Streets
