= St. John's Evangelical Lutheran Church (Culp, Pennsylvania) =

Historic church in Pennsylvania, United States

- U.S. National Register of Historic Places
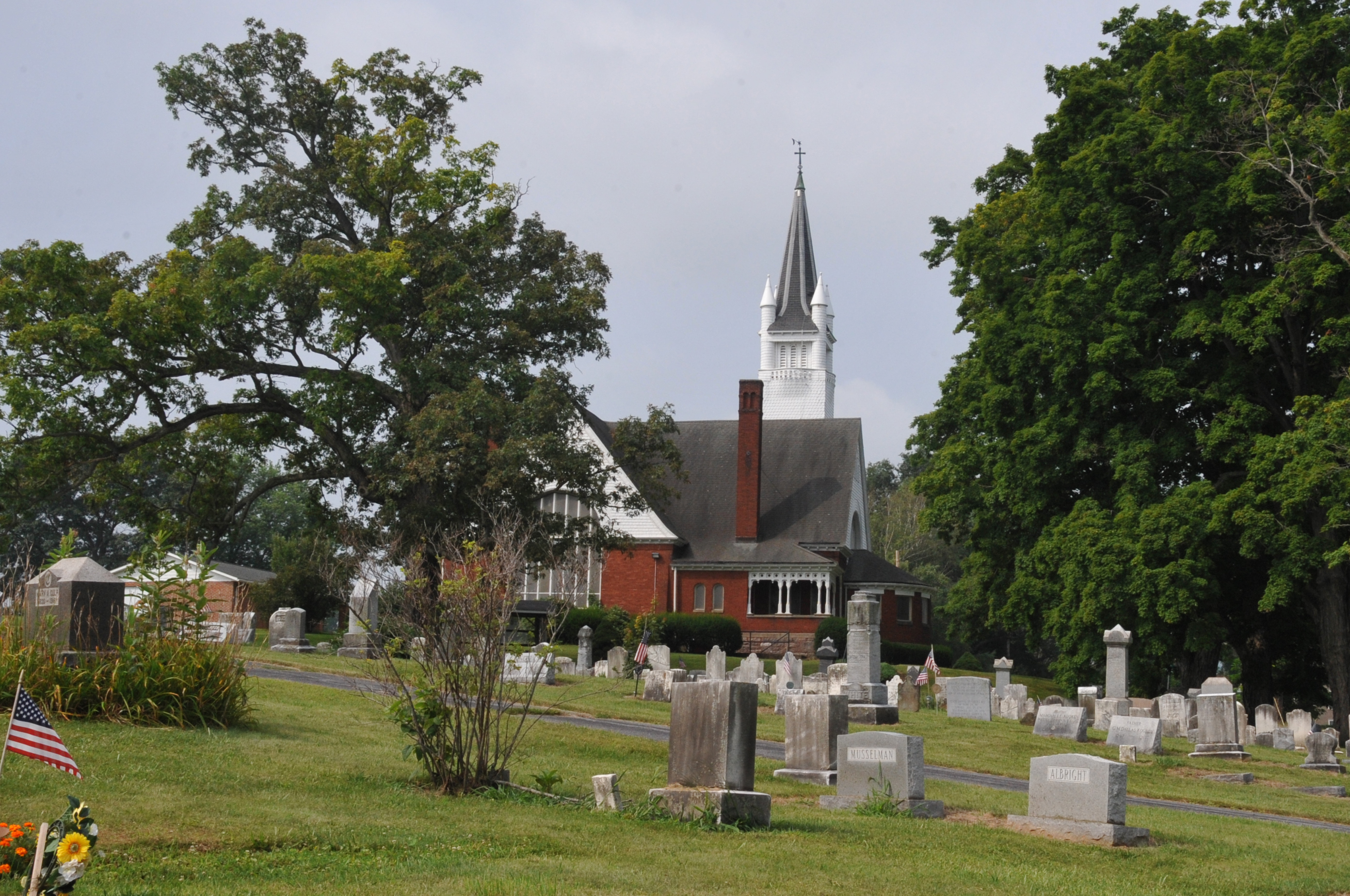

- Location within Pennsylvania Location within the United States
- Location: Sinking Valley on Old Water Street Road, Northeast of Culp, near Culp, Pennsylvania
- Coordinates: 40°35′39″N 78°15′1″W
- Area: 0.5 acres (0.20 ha)
- Built: 1892
- Architectural style: Queen Anne
- NRHP reference No.: 78002350
- Added to NRHP: September 18, 1978

St. John's Evangelical Lutheran Church, also known as the Brick Church, is a historic Evangelical Lutheran church located in Culp, Blair County, Pennsylvania. It was built in 1892, and is a cross-gabled red brick church with steep gables and a steeple with Queen Anne influences. It features large, many paned stained glass windows with semi-circular arches in the gable ends.

It was added to the National Register of Historic Places in 1978.
