= J.L. Noble School =

- U.S. National Register of Historic Places
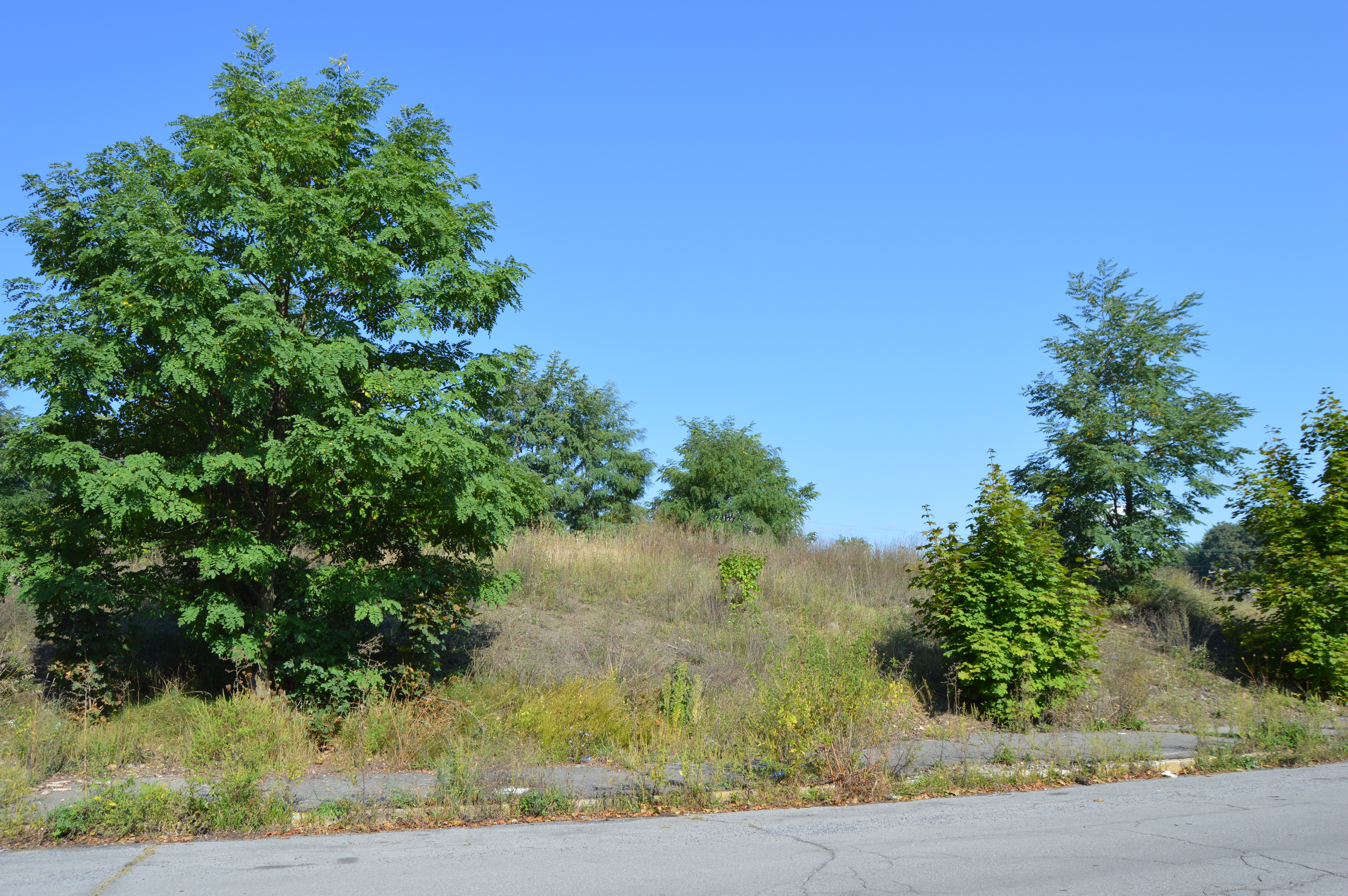
- Twelfth Avenue at the school's former location

- Location within Pennsylvania Location within the United States
- Location: 209 12th Ave., Juniata, Altoona, Pennsylvania
- Coordinates: 40°32′17″N 78°23′34″W
- Area: less than one acre
- Built: 1912, 1929
- Architect: Frank A. Hersch; Frederic J. Shollar
- Architectural style: Renaissance
- NRHP reference No.: 96000712
- Added to NRHP: July 11, 1996

The J.L. Noble School was a historic school building located in the Juniata neighborhood of Altoona, Pennsylvania, United States. It was built in 1912, and was a two-story, yellow brick building with cut brownstone detailing in the Renaissance Revival style. An annex was built in 1929.

It was added to the National Register of Historic Places in 1996.
