= D.S. Keith Junior High School =

- U.S. National Register of Historic Places
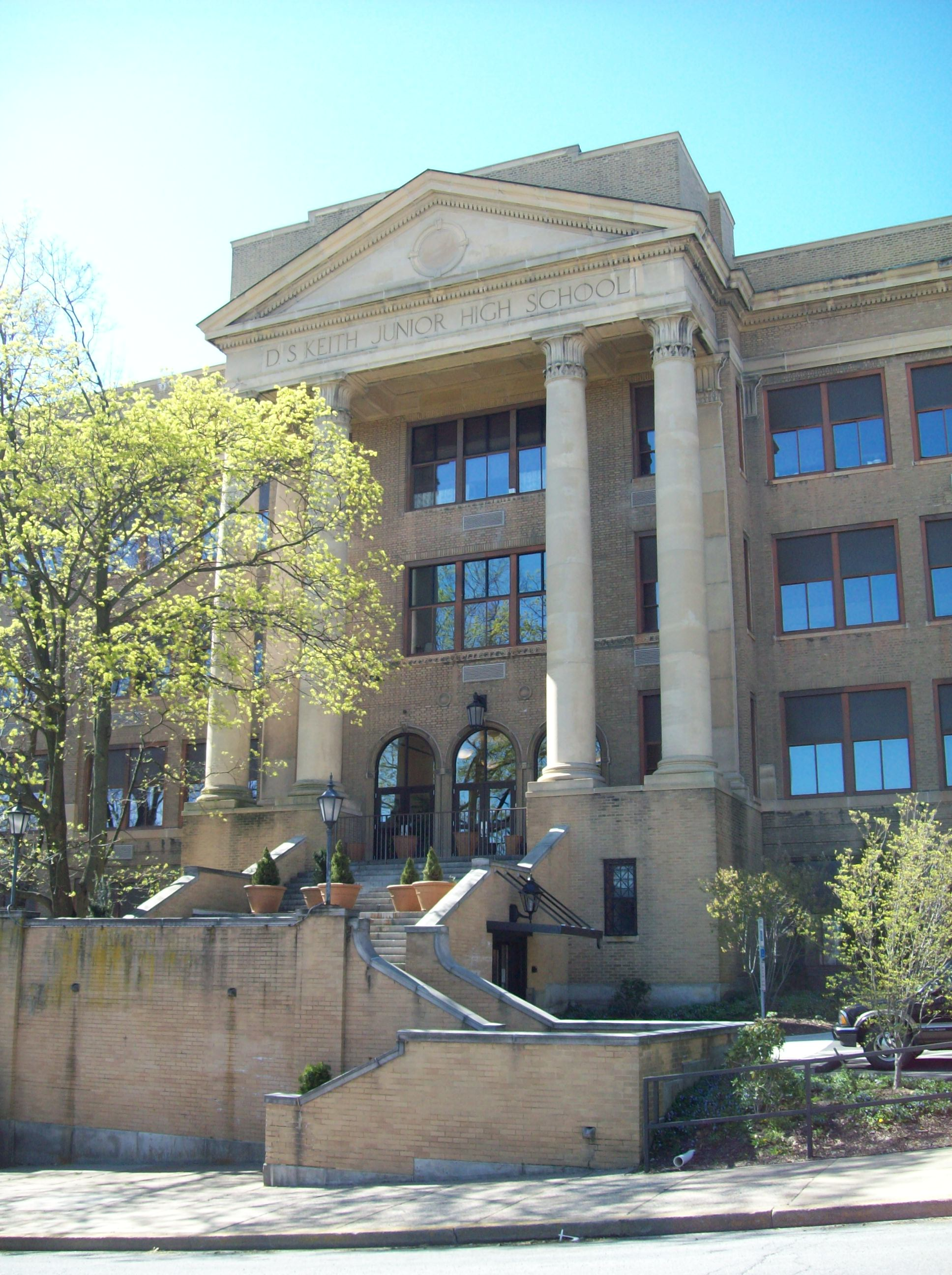
- D.S. Keith Junior High School, April 2012

- Location within Pennsylvania
- Location: 1318 19th Ave., Altoona, Pennsylvania
- Coordinates: 40°31′11″N 78°24′32″W
- Area: 2.3 acres (0.93 ha)
- Built: 1928-1930
- Architect: Hersh & Shollar; Snyder, John C.; Fellrel, Frank
- Architectural style: Classical Revival
- MPS: Educational Resources of Pennsylvania MPS
- NRHP reference No.: 11000922
- Added to NRHP: December 20, 2011

The D.S. Keith Junior High School is a historic school building located at Altoona, Pennsylvania. It was built between 1928 and 1930, and is a three-story, E-shaped, Classical Revival-style building. It has been converted to 53 senior apartments known as Keith Hilltop Terrace Apartments.

It was listed on the National Register of Historic Places in 2011.
