= Jacob Isett House and Store =

Historic house in Pennsylvania, United States

- U.S. National Register of Historic Places
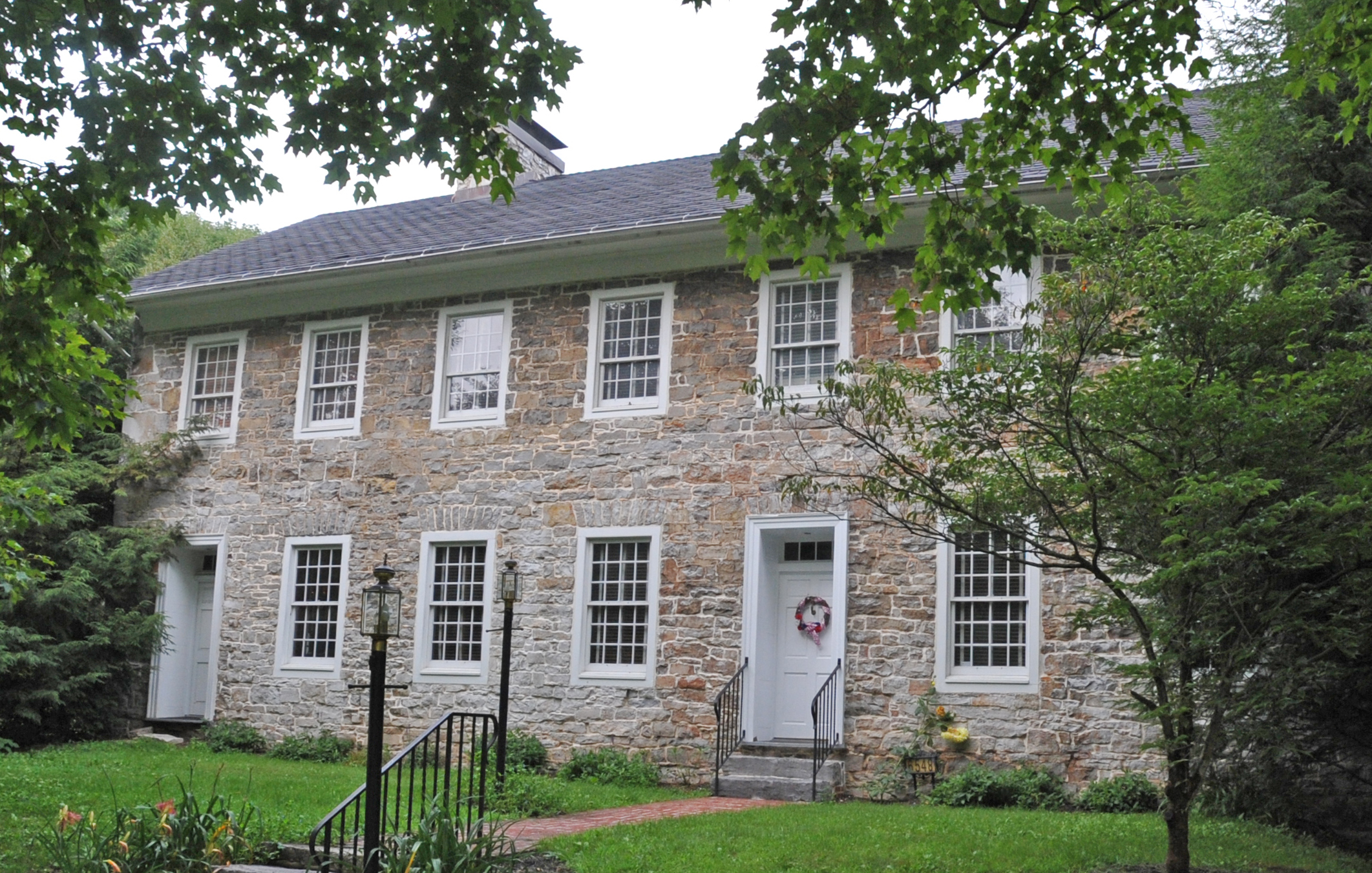

- Location within Pennsylvania Location within the United States
- Nearest city: S.R.1013, 0.3 miles (0.5 km) south of junction with S.R.1015, Arch Spring, Pennsylvania
- Coordinates: 40°36′16″N 78°12′25″W
- Area: 8 acres (3.2 ha)
- Built: 1799
- Architectural style: Georgian
- NRHP reference No.: 97000290
- Added to NRHP: March 28, 1997

The Jacob Isett House and Store, also known as Arch Spring Farm, is an historic home and store building that is located in Arch Spring, Blair County, Pennsylvania, United States.

It was added to the National Register of Historic Places in 1997.

== History and architectural features ==
The property includes the Jacob Isett House (1805), store (1799), and summer kitchen; five wood frame outbuildings (c. 1870); and various archaeological remains. The house is a 2 1/2-story, seven-bay, limestone dwelling, which was designed in a vernacular Georgian style. Connected to the house is the one-story summer kitchen. The store is a two-story limestone building. The wood frame outbuildings are a wood shed, weigh shed, stable, barn, and implement shed. The archaeological site includes the remains of an integrated mill village.
