= Chatham Roberdeau Wheat =

American military officer (1826–1862)

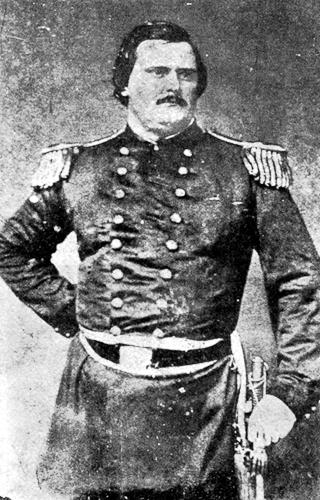
- Major Chatham Roberdeau Wheat

Member of the Louisiana House of Representatives
- In office 1848–1849

Personal details
- Born: April 9, 1826 Alexandria, Virginia
- Died: June 27, 1862 (aged 36) Hanover County, Virginia
- Resting place: Hollywood Cemetery; Richmond, Virginia
- Relatives: Daniel Roberdeau (great-grandfather)
- Education: University of Nashville

Military service
- Allegiance: United States; López Filibuster; Filibuster Nicaragua; Mexico; Kingdom of Sardinia; Confederate States
- Branch/service: United States Army; Mexican Army; Royal Sardinian Army; Confederate States Army
- Years of service: 1846-1848 (USA); 1855 (Mexico); 1860 (Sardinia); 1861-1862 (CSA)
- Rank: Captain (USA); Brigadier General (Mexico); Major (CSA)
- Battles/wars: Mexican–American War; Lopez Expedition; Revolution of Ayutla; Filibuster War; Expedition of the Thousand; American Civil War

Chatham Roberdeau Wheat (April 9, 1826 – June 27, 1862) was an American politician, lawyer, adventurer and military officer serving both the United States Army and the Confederate States Army.

Wheat first saw action as a captain of the United States Volunteers during the Mexican–American War where he was promoted to a lieutenant. Upon leaving the military, he successfully sought election to Louisiana House of Representatives, serving a 1 year term from 1848–1849. Following his term in office he served as a mercenary in Cuba, Mexico, and Italy, and later as a major in the Confederate States Army during the American Civil War.

Wheat is remembered as a pioneer of the filibuster movement in the Antebellum United States, he led several raids into Cuba where he was commissioned a colonel and gained most of his military experience.

== Early life and career ==
Chatham Roberdeau Wheat was born on April 9, 1826, to Selina Blair (née Patten) and John Thomas Wheat. His great-grandfather was Pennsylvania politician and Founding Father Daniel Roberdeau. His father was an Episcopalian preacher. Wheat moved with his family to Nashville, Tennessee, when he was 12 years old. He studied at the Episcopal High School in Alexandria, Virginia. His father would also serve as a chaplain in the Confederate States Army.

Growing to 6 feet 4 inches (1.93 m) tall and weighing 240 pounds (110 kg), Wheat's physical stature was impressive. He was elected a lieutenant then later as a captain in the First Tennessee Mounted Regiment under General Winfield Scott in the Mexican–American War.

He left the military due to illness and returned to Louisiana, where he was elected a representative of New Orleans to the Louisiana State Legislature in 1848. He was admitted to the bar in 1849.

Subsequently, his wanderlust inspired him to undertake a series of international mercenary and filibuster adventures. He was commissioned a colonel by Narciso López in his Cuban filibustering expedition.

In 1855, he joined the Juan Álvarez campaign against Santa Anna where he was commissioned a brigadier general in charge of artillery by the State of Guerrero.

He travelled to Italy to serve under Garibaldi but soon left when Virginia seceded from the Union.

== Civil War and death ==
At the outbreak of the Civil War, Wheat returned to New Orleans. Financed by backers of his previous Nicaragua adventures, he scoured the wharves of New Orleans to organize what became known as "Wheat's Special Battalion", or the "Louisiana Tigers", a hard fighting, hard living unit that performed well on the battlefield but was renowned for its lack of discipline. The battalion, which numbered 500 men, consisted of immigrants from Ireland and Germany, as well as natives of New Orleans. Most of the men were "street toughs". They were generally considered to be at the "bottom of the barrel" socially. They were very loyal to Wheat, who was a charismatic and remarkably humble leader of men.

Arriving in Virginia just in time to participate in the First Battle of Bull Run, Wheat and his Tigers performed well in combat. Wheat took a Union bullet through both lungs in the battle; informed by a surgeon that there was no instance on record of a man surviving such a wound, Wheat replied, "Well then, I will put my case on record."

When his unit was placed under the command of then Brig. Gen. Richard Taylor in November 1861, conflict arose between the Tigers and Taylor. The conflict was resolved when Taylor commanded the execution of two enlisted Tigers who had been found guilty of drunkenness and insubordination.

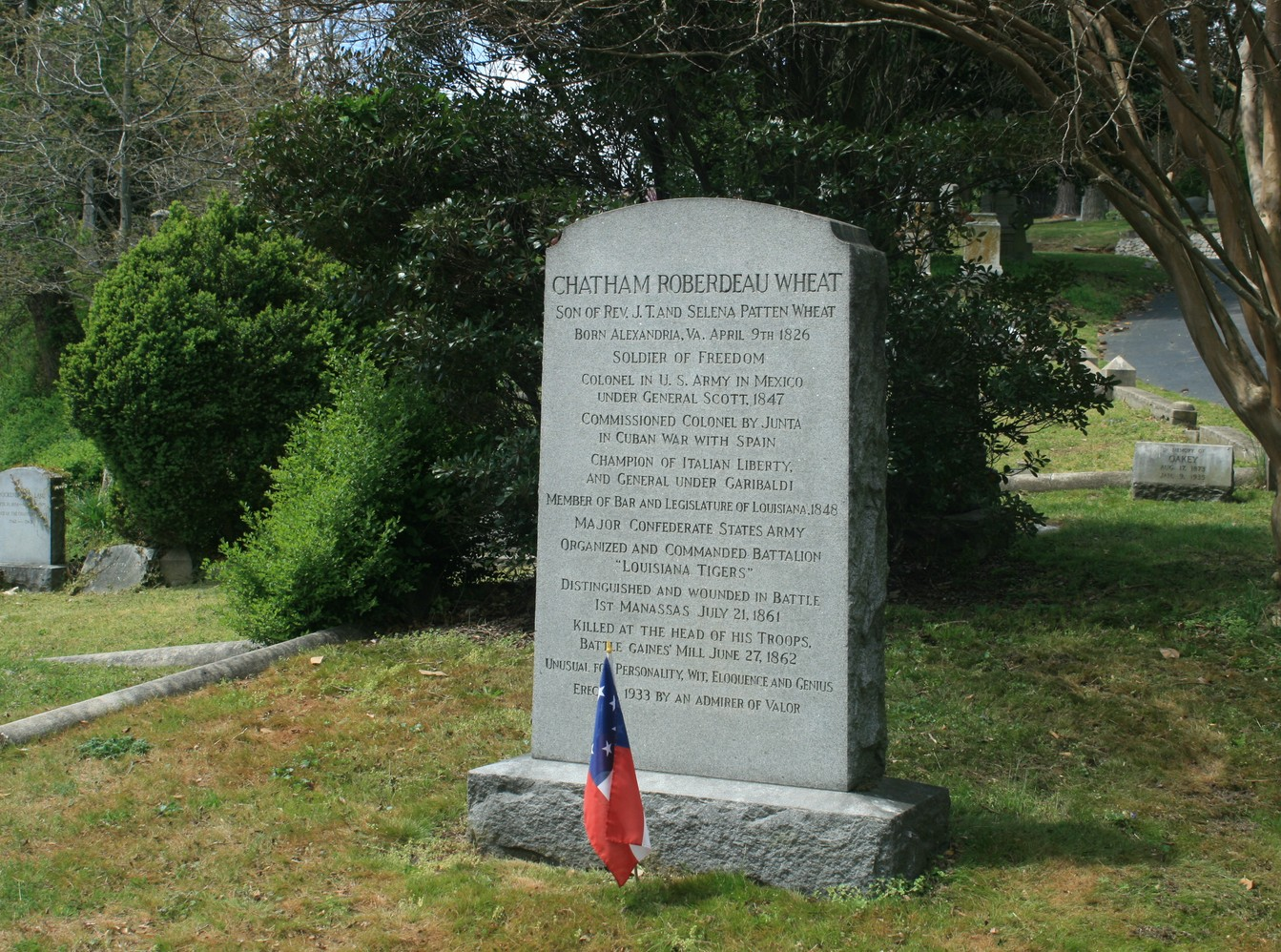
Wheat's grave in Hollywood Cemetery

Wheat and his battalion served in Jackson's Valley Campaign and the Peninsula Campaign. He was mortally wounded at the Battle of Gaines's Mill in June 1862. He received a battlefield interment and was reinterred in Hollywood Cemetery in Richmond, Virginia. Later in the war, the fabled "Hays' brigade," commanded by Harry Thompson Hays renamed themselves "The Louisiana Tigers" in honor of Wheat.

== See also ==
- filibuster (military)
- mercenary
