= Charles B. Dudley House =

- Formerly listed on the U.S. National Register of Historic Places
- Location: 802 Lexington Ave., Altoona, Pennsylvania
- Area: less than one acre
- Built: 1898
- NRHP reference No.: 76001605

Significant dates
- Added to NRHP: May 11, 1976
- Removed from NRHP: January 3, 2001

The Charles B. Dudley House was a historic home located at Altoona, Pennsylvania. As of 2025, the property is occupied by a parking lot.

It was listed on the National Register of Historic Places in 1976, and delisted in 2001.
