= Knickerbocker Historic District =

Historic district in Pennsylvania, United States

- U.S. National Register of Historic Places
- U.S. Historic district
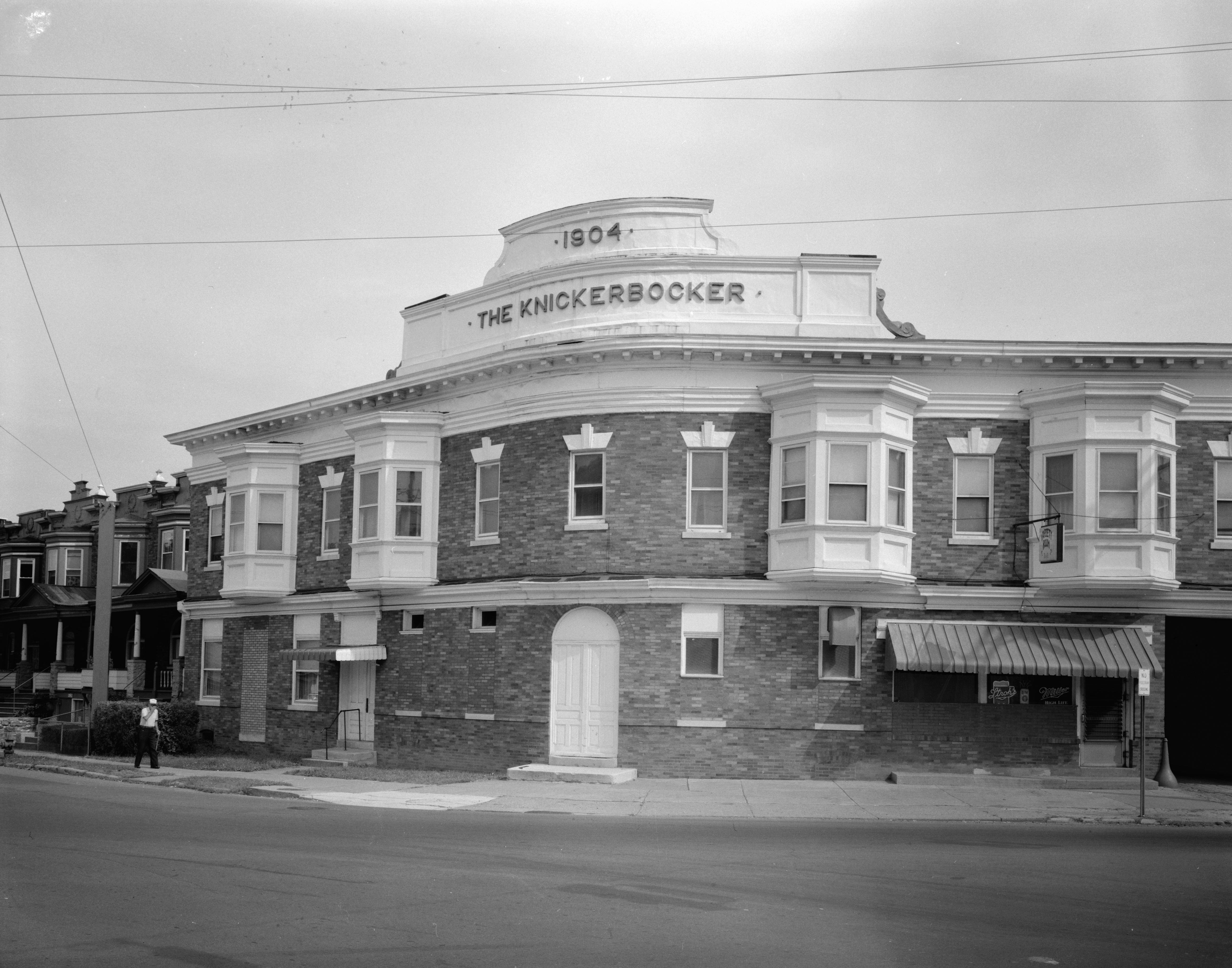
- Altoona Knickerbocker.JPG

- Location within Pennsylvania Location within the United States
- Location: 4th, 5th and 6th Aves., Burgoon Rd., 40th and 41sts., Altoona, Pennsylvania
- Coordinates: 40°29′11″N 78°24′50″W
- Area: 13.5 acres (5.5 ha)
- Built: 1904
- Built by: Knickerbocker Contracting Co.
- Architectural style: Late 19th And 20th Century Revivals
- NRHP reference No.: 02000064
- Added to NRHP: February 20, 2002

The Knickerbocker Historic District is a national historic district that is located in Altoona, Blair County, Pennsylvania.

It was added to the National Register of Historic Places in 2002.

== History and architectural features ==
This district includes 153 contributing rowhouse buildings that are located in a residential area of Altoona. The buildings were primarily built between 1903 and 1930, as affordable worker's housing and reflect a number of popular architectural styles, including Colonial Revival and Classical Revival. The buildings feature decorative parapets, bay windows, porch posts, pediments, and a variety of ornamentation. The district is visually dominated by the former Knikerbocker Hotel (c. 1906).
