= Tyrone Armory =

- U.S. National Register of Historic Places
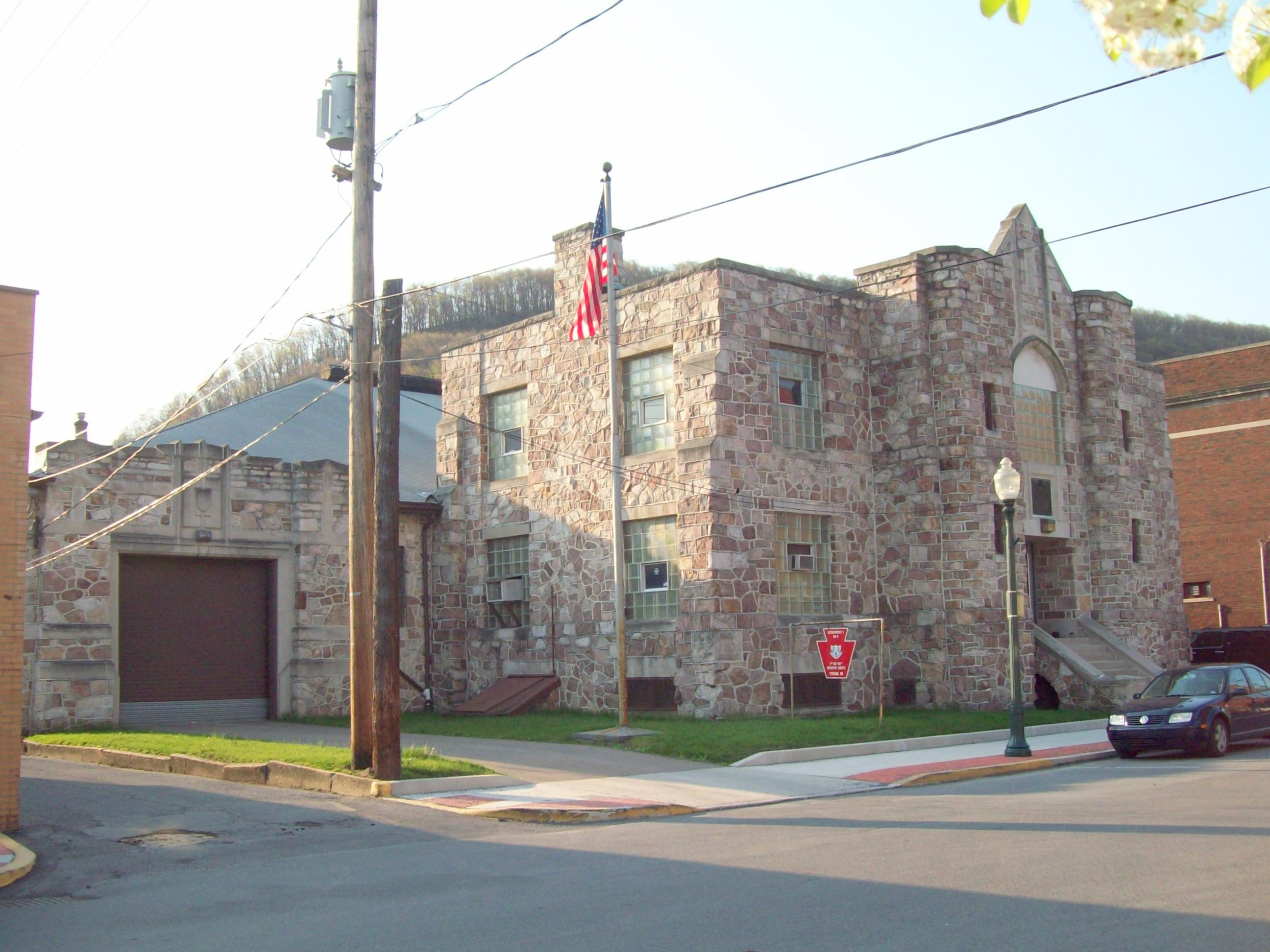
- Tyrone Armory, April 2010

- Location within Pennsylvania Location within the United States
- Location: 956 S. Logan Ave., Tyrone, Pennsylvania
- Coordinates: 40°40′11″N 78°14′25″W
- Area: 0.6 acres (0.24 ha)
- Built: 1912
- Architect: Multiple
- Architectural style: Late Gothic Revival
- MPS: Pennsylvania National Guard Armories MPS
- NRHP reference No.: 89002083
- Added to NRHP: December 22, 1989

Tyrone Armory is an historic National Guard armory located at Tyrone, Blair County, Pennsylvania. It was built between 1912 and 1918, and is an "I"-plan building built of Medina sandstone in the Late Gothic Revival style. The two-story front section houses administrative functions, and the rear is the former stable area. Between these sections is the drill hall, which has a hipped roof.

The armory was added to the National Register of Historic Places in 1989.
