= Etna Furnace (Williamsburg, Pennsylvania) =

- U.S. National Register of Historic Places
- U.S. Historic district
- Pennsylvania state historical marker
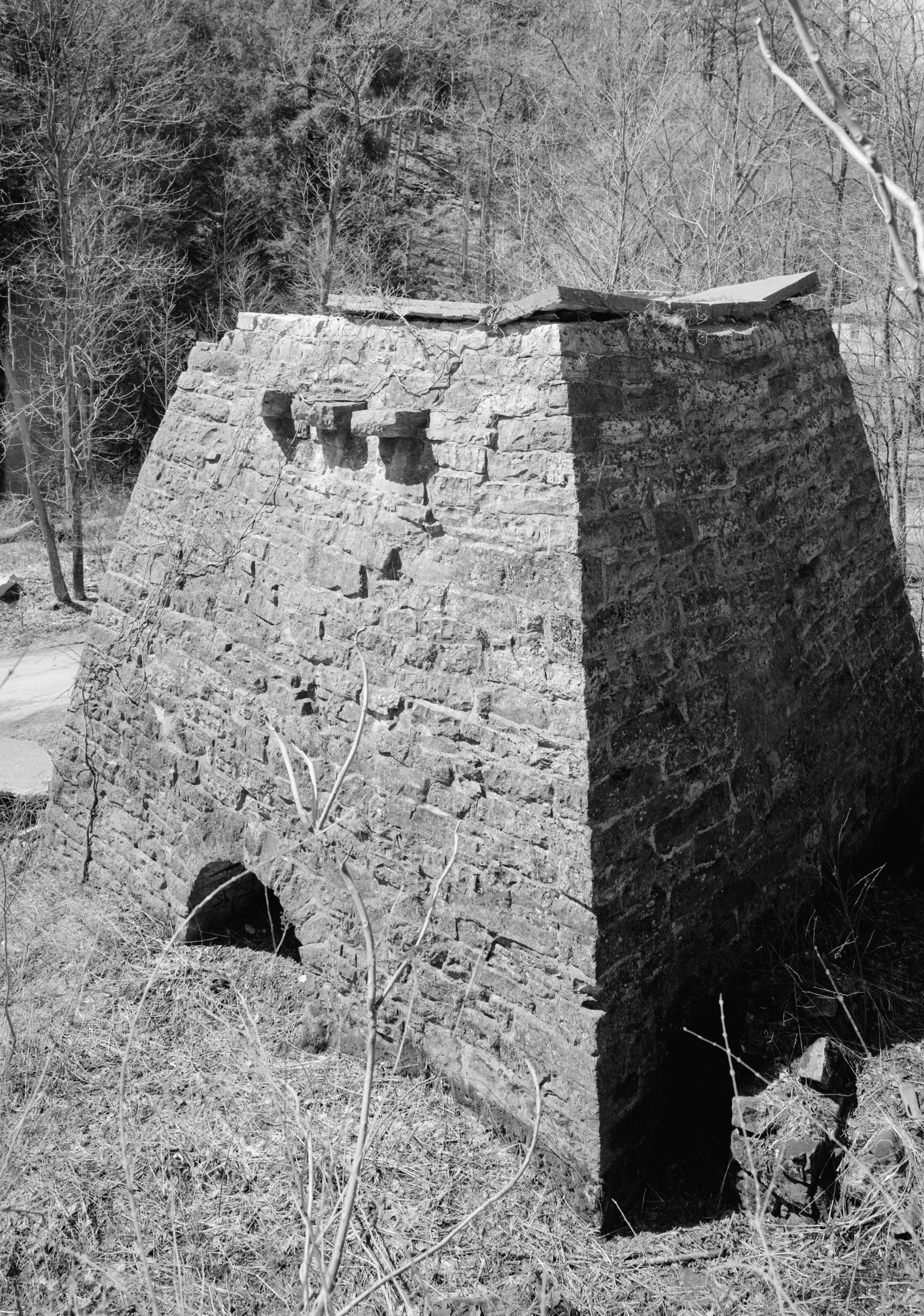
- Etna Furnace, 1988

- Location within Pennsylvania Location within the United States
- Nearest city: North of Williamsburg: roughly the area south and east of the bend of the Frankstown Branch Juniata River at Mount Etna, Catharine Township, Pennsylvania
- Coordinates: 40°31′34″N 78°11′11″W
- Area: 161 acres (65 ha)
- Built: 1805, 1832
- Built by: David Stewart, William Moore, John Canan
- MPS: Iron and Steel Resources of Pennsylvania MPS
- NRHP reference No.: 73001593, 91001145 (Boundary Increase)

Significant dates
- Added to NRHP: April 11, 1973, September 6, 1991 (Boundary Increase)
- Designated PHMC: August 01, 1961

Etna Furnace, also known as Mount Etna Furnace, Aetna Furnace, and Aetna Iron Works, is a historic iron furnace complex and national historic district located at Catharine Township, Blair County, Pennsylvania. The district includes five contributing buildings, six contributing sites, and two contributing structures. It encompasses a community developed around an iron furnace starting in 1805. Included in the district is the four-sided stone furnace (1808), gristmill site (c. 1793), canal locks (c. 1832), site of lock keeper's house (c. 1832), aqueduct (c. 1832, rebuilt 1848), two small houses, the ruins of a charcoal house (1808), the foundation of a tally house, a blacksmith shop (c. 1831), bank barn (c. 1831), foundation of a boarding house, three family tenant houses, two iron master mansions (one destroyed), a store and paymaster's office (c. 1831), Methodist / Episcopal Church (1860), and cemetery with graves dating between 1832 and 1859.

It was added to the National Register of Historic Places in 1973, with a boundary increase in 1991.
