= Brush Mountain (Blair County, Pennsylvania) =

Mountain in Blair County, Pennsylvania, United States

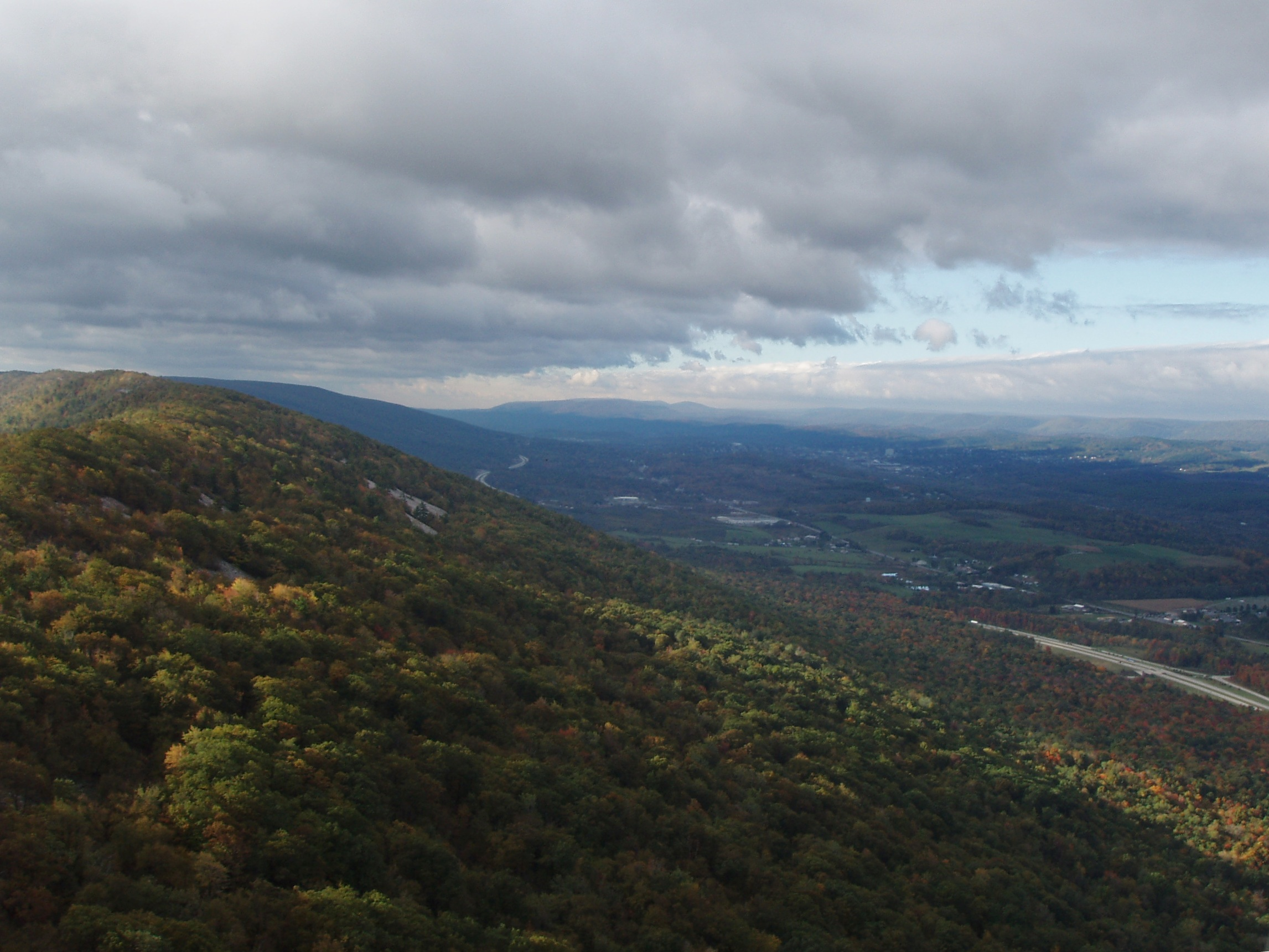
- The higher southwest section of Brush Mountain looking southwest toward Altoona. Interstate 99 is lower right. The Allegheny Front is center right, with Blue Knob in the center.

Highest point
- Elevation: 2,557 ft (779 m)
- Coordinates: 40°29′15.68″N 78°21′7.79″W

Geography
- Location: Blair County, Pennsylvania, U.S.
- Parent range: Appalachian Mountains
- Topo map: USGS Millheim (PA) Quadrangle

Climbing
- First ascent: unknown

Brush Mountain is a stratigraphic ridge in the Appalachian Mountains of central Pennsylvania, United States, lying east of the Allegheny Front and west of Tussey Mountain. It runs along the southeast side of the Little Juniata River and forms a horseshoe around Sinking Run, and is the westernmost ridge in its section of the Ridge-and-valley Appalachians. The western ridge line separates the Logan Valley from the Sinking Valley.

Brush Mountain lies entirely in Blair County. It runs from the water gap formed with Bald Eagle Mountain by the Little Juniata River at Tyrone, south to the Sinking Valley anticline fold near Altoona then turns northeast to the Canoe Valley syncline fold, where the ridge becomes Canoe Mountain. The total length of Brush Mountain is approximately 30 miles (48 km).

No major roads or rivers cross the ridge or run through gaps. Kettle Reservoir collects surface runoff from a small area in the fold, and the dam was made by filling in a small ravine. Kettle Road, a secondary road, runs through the ravine near the dam east into Sinking Valley. A major power transmission line crosses the ridge twice, midway between the folds.

The Brush Mountain Ridge is popular with soaring birds and glider pilots ridge soaring along its slopes. This ridge is part of a chain of ridges that stretch south to Tennessee. The fold at the south end of Brush Mountain forms a gap in the chain, with the continuation of the ridge line 6 miles (10 km) south on Dunning Mountain.

Pennsylvania State Game Lands Number 166 lies on Brush Mountain south of Sinking Hollow and on Canoe Mountain and in the valley between.

== Tornado ==
Shortly after 11:00 a.m. EST on July 19, 1996, an F1 tornado touched down northeast of Altoona approximately 1 mile northwest of Sickles Corner on Brush Mountain. This tornado moved southeast, taking down a swath of trees along the mountain and causing minor damage to homes along a 1.5-mile (2.4 km) path before ending one half mile southeast of Sickles Corner. The path width averaged about one half mile wide. This storm was the fourth in the family of tornadoes that had crossed Clarion, Jefferson, Indiana, Clearfield and Cambria counties.

== Geology ==
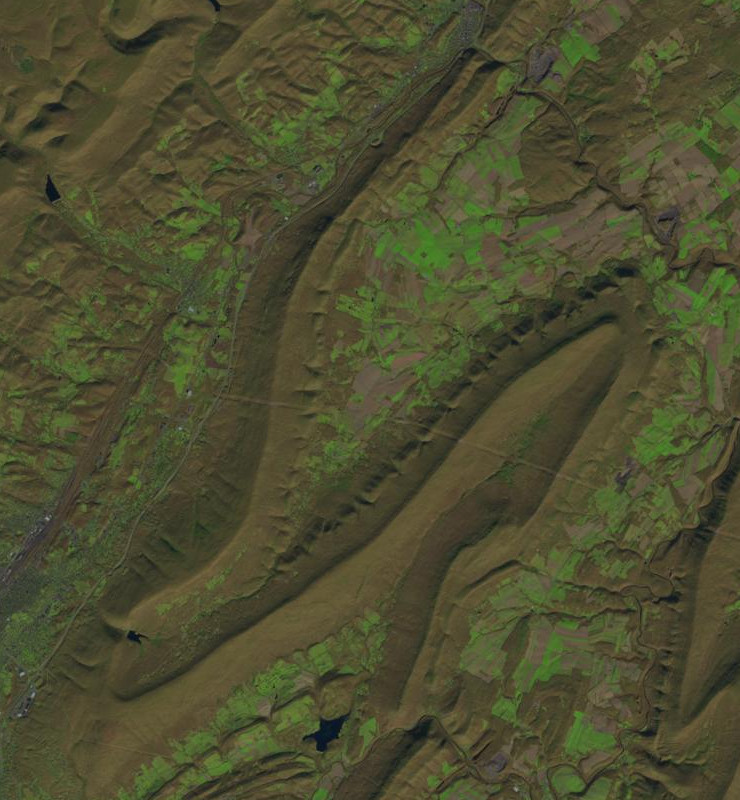
2016 Landsat image of Sinking Valley and Brush Mountain

Brush Mountain is in the northern portion of the Ridge and Valley province of the vast Appalachian Mountains range. Bald Eagle Mountain and neighboring Tussey Mountain are made up of Paleozoic rocks, consisting of the Ordovician Bald Eagle Formation (sandstone), the Juniata Formation (shale and siltstone), and the Silurian Tuscarora Formation (quartzite) that were folded during the Alleghanian orogeny in the Permian period, then eroded down to their present form.

The Tuscarora Quartzite is more resistant to erosion than the Bald Eagle Sandstone, and both are more resistant than the Juniata formation between them or the other formations stratigraphically above and below them. The two sandstones thus form a double ridge line, with the harder Tuscarora at the crest.

On the north end of the mountain, the rock layers are tipped near vertical, and the mountain has the same double-crested ridge shape as the Bald Eagle ridge extending to the north, with the crests near the center of the harder rock layers. A little further south, there are several fault lines running across the ridge, and the rock layers then slope down to the west. This leaves the Tuscarora formation more parallel to the steeper western slope, with the crest marking the dividing line between the layers. The tougher rock also protected the slope from erosion, leaving a higher southern ridge line.

The tilted aspect of the rock layers leaves the Juniata formation more perpendicular to the upper portion of the shallower opposite slope, below the steep crest. The Bald Eagle formation below holds back the eroding rock, creating a shelf above a steeper lower slope running down to Sinking Valley. The drainage in the shelf area cut a series of small ravines, leaving terraces between them. The terraces wrap around the inside of the anticline fold around Sinking Valley, and then around the outside of the reverse fold on Canoe Mountain.

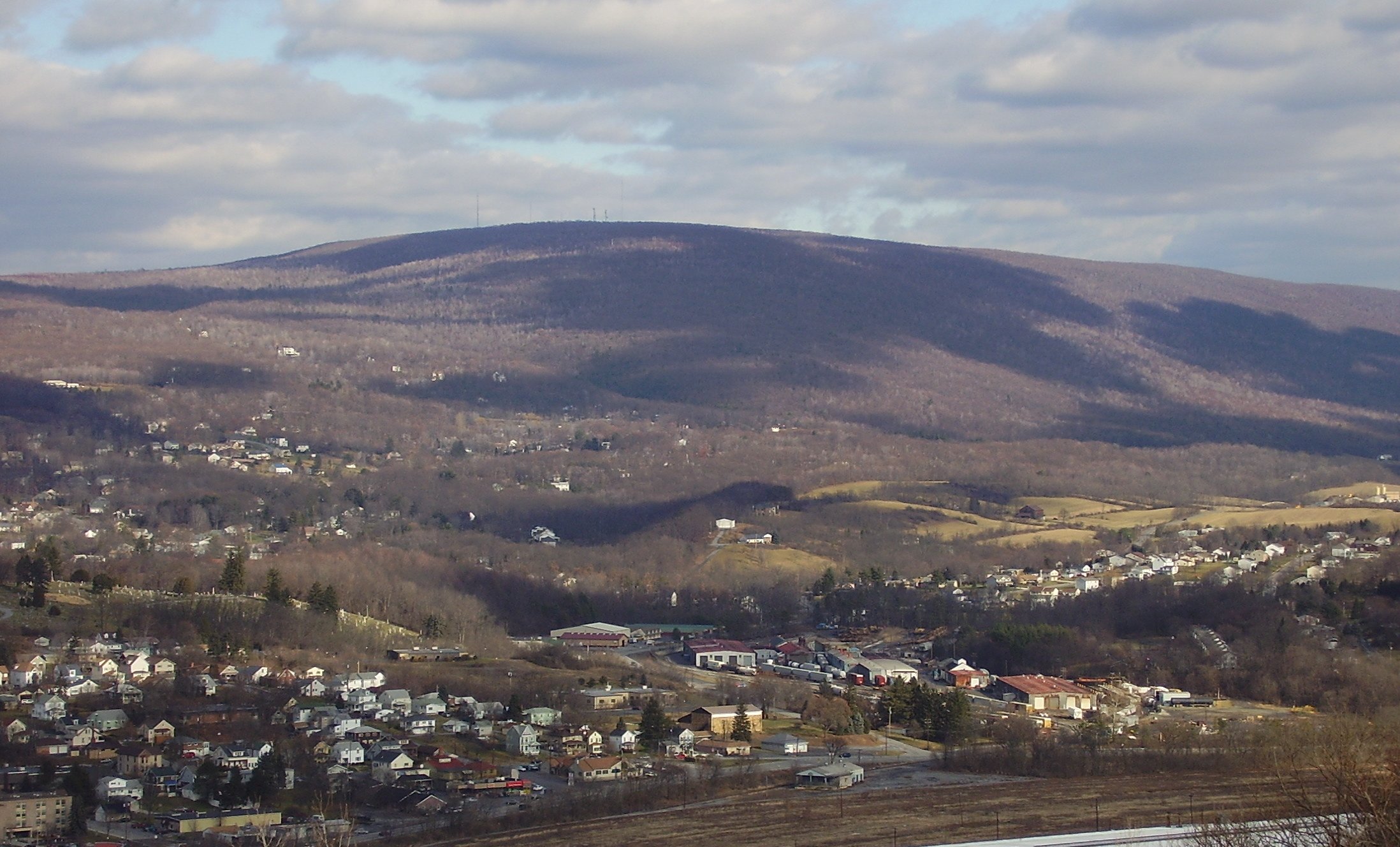
Brush Mountain looming over Hollidaysburg

== See also ==
- List of mountains of the Alleghenies
- Bald Eagle Mountain § Geology
