= Daniel Roberdeau =

American Founding Father and politician

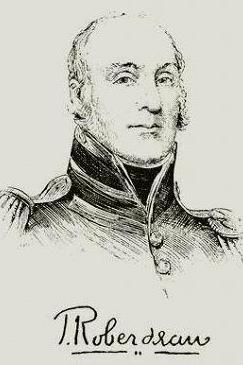

Delegate from Pennsylvania to the Continental Congress
- In office February 1777 – 1779

Brigadier General, Pennsylvania militia
- In office July 4 1776 – c. 1779

Founder of Fort Roberdeau
- In office 1778–1779

Member of the Pennsylvania Provincial Assembly
- In office 1756–1760

Personal details
- Born: 1727 St. Christopher Island, West Indies
- Died: January 5, 1795 (aged 67–68) Winchester, Virginia, U.S.
- Resting place: Mount Hebron Cemetery, Winchester, Virginia, U.S.
- Relatives: Chatham Roberdeau Wheat (great-grandson)
- Profession: Merchant, military officer, politician

Daniel Roberdeau (1727 – January 5, 1795) was an American Founding Father and merchant residing in Philadelphia, Pennsylvania, at the time of the American War of Independence. He represented Pennsylvania from 1777 to 1779 in the Continental Congress, where he signed the Articles of Confederation. Roberdeau served as a brigadier general in the Pennsylvania state militia during the war.

== Family and early life ==
Coat of Arms of Daniel Roberdeau

Roberdeau was born in 1727 on the Island of St. Christopher in the West Indies. His father was a Huguenot immigrant named Isaac Roberdeau; his mother, a Scot, Mary Cunningham. After the death of his father, he immigrated to Philadelphia with his mother and sisters. Roberdeau became a timber merchant.

== Early service ==
Roberdeau was active in establishing Freemasonry in Philadelphia, which brought him to the attention of Benjamin Franklin and other civic leaders. He served on the Board of Managers for Pennsylvania Hospital in Philadelphia in 1756-1757. He was elected to the Pennsylvania Colonial Assembly, serving from 1756 to 1760, but then declined further service.

== Revolutionary War service ==
When war neared, he joined the Associators (as the Pennsylvania rebel militia was known) and was made colonel of his regiment. In May 1776 he presided at several public meetings calling for the existing Pennsylvania delegation to the Continental Congress to be replaced with members who supported a Declaration of Independence. As a result, he was named to the Committee of Safety, and on July 4, 1776 was named a brigadier general in the state militia.

== Congressional service ==
Roberdeau was first elected to the Continental Congress in February 1777 and served there until 1779. Later that year, when the Continental Army entered winter quarters at Valley Forge, he worked with General George Washington to set up a militia support network known as the Flying Camp and served as its commander.

In April 1778, Roberdeau took a short leave from Congress. He had noted the shortage of powder and shot in the army and used the time off to establish a lead mine in what was then a part of Bedford County, now a part of Blair County. To protect the mine and camp from Indian attacks, he built a palisade, Fort Roberdeau, at his own expense. Historically, Roberdeau's fort was known as the "Lead Mine Fort". It has been reconstructed near its original site in Sinking Valley, near present-day Altoona, Pennsylvania.

After the war, Roberdeau moved to Alexandria, Virginia, and eventually settled in Winchester, where he died on January 5, 1795. He is buried in the Mount Hebron Cemetery there. His son, Isaac Roberdeau, became a civil engineer and U.S. Army officer, who helped Pierre L'Enfant lay out the plan for Washington, D.C. His great-grandson was Louisiana politician and military officer Chatham Roberdeau Wheat.
