= Allegheny Furnace =

- U.S. National Register of Historic Places
- Pennsylvania state historical marker
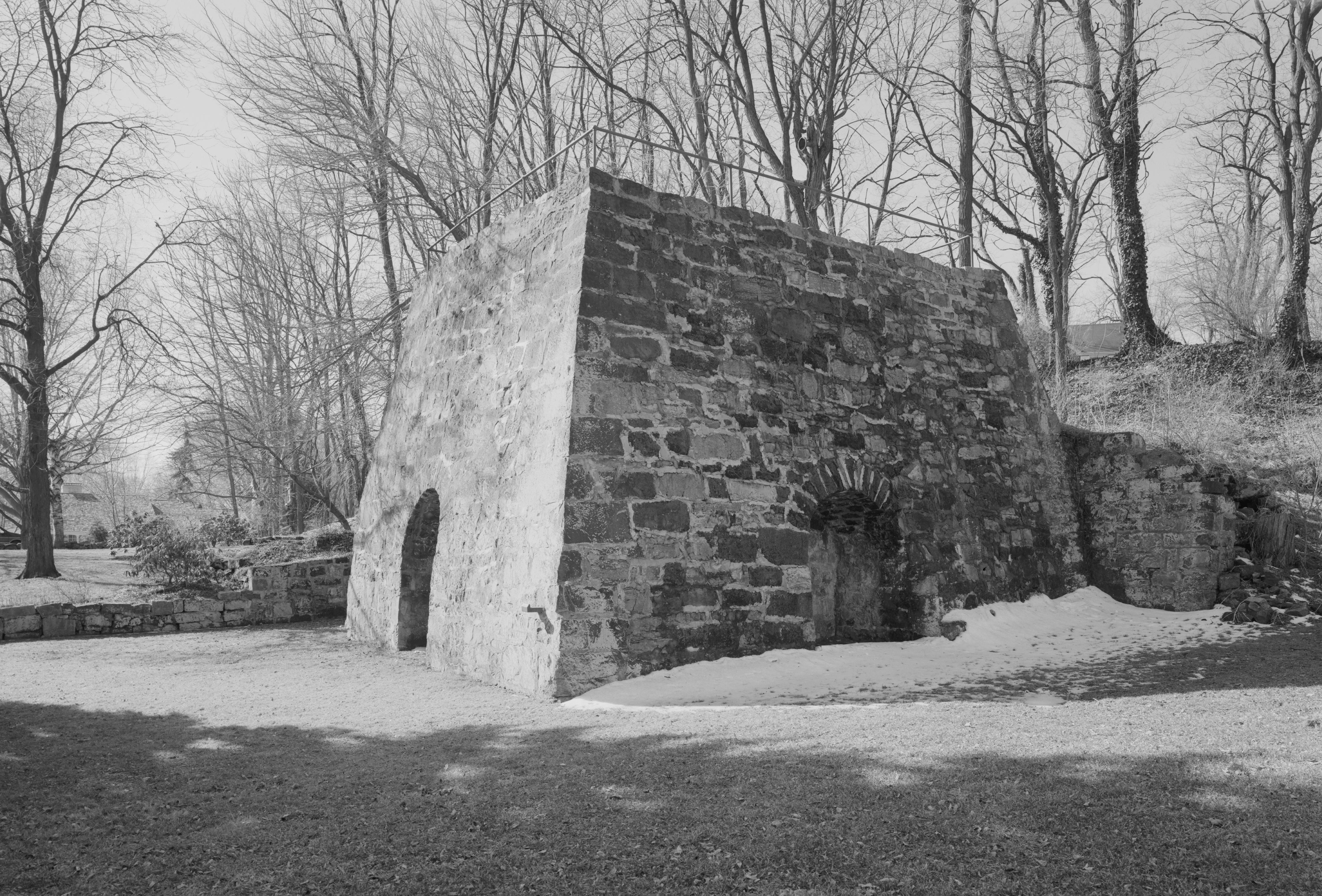
- Allegheny Furnace, 1989

- Location within Pennsylvania Location within the United States
- Location: 3400 Crescent Rd., Altoona, Pennsylvania
- Coordinates: 40°29′32″N 78°24′26″W
- Area: less than one acre
- Built: 1811, 1847, 1852
- Architectural style: Iron furnace
- MPS: Iron and Steel Resources of Pennsylvania MPS
- NRHP reference No.: 91001131

Significant dates
- Added to NRHP: September 6, 1991
- Designated PHMC: April 1, 1947

The Allegheny Furnace is an historic iron furnace, which is located in Altoona, Blair County, Pennsylvania, USA.

It was added to the National Register of Historic Places in 1991.

== History ==
The furnace was built in 1811, with alterations and upgrades added in 1847 and 1852. The furnace went out of blast in 1817 and was not revived until 1835. It used charcoal as fuel until it was converted to coke in the 1860s. It permanently closed down in the 1870s.
