= Fort Roberdeau =

- U.S. National Register of Historic Places
- Pennsylvania state historical marker
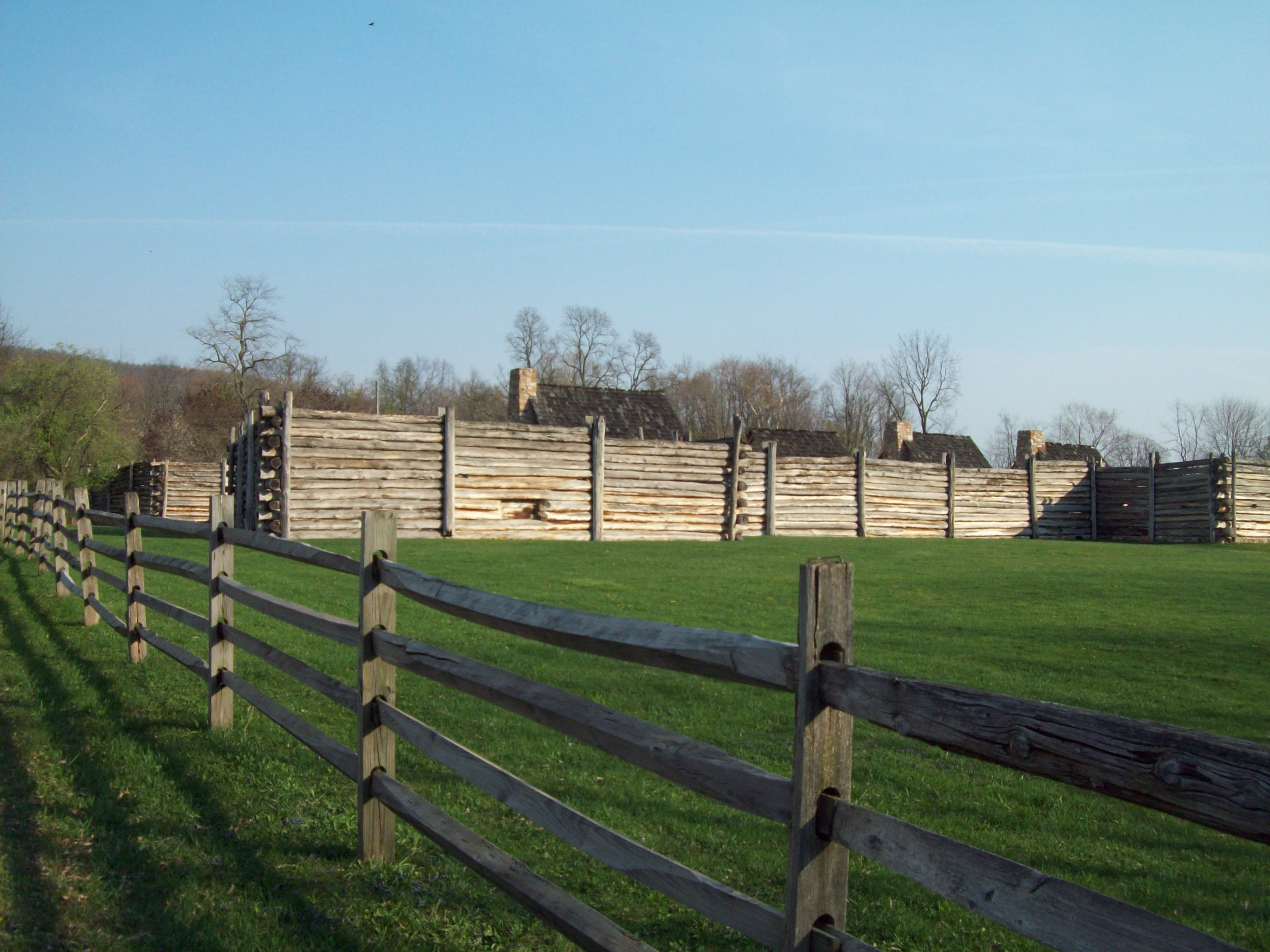
- Fort Roberdeau, April 2010

- Location within Pennsylvania Location within the United States
- Nearest city: Altoona, Pennsylvania
- Coordinates: 40°34′57″N 78°16′26″W
- Area: 2 acres (0.81 ha)
- Built: 1778, 1939-1941
- NRHP reference No.: 74001753

Significant dates
- Added to NRHP: May 29, 1974
- Designated PHMC: April 01, 1947

Fort Roberdeau, also known as The Lead Mine Fort, is an historic fort, which is located in Tyrone Township, outside Altoona, Pennsylvania.

It was added to the National Register of Historic Places in 1974.

== History and architectural features ==
Built in 1778, during the American Revolution, Fort Roberdeau was occupied until 1780. Initial efforts were made to reconstruct the fort between 1939 and 1941 by concerned local agencies with support from the National Youth Administration. The stockade was finally restored as a Bicentennial project between 1975 and 1976.

The original fort was built of horizontal logs with a bastion at each corner, and was erected by General Daniel Roberdeau to protect local lead mining activities from the Native Americans and Tories.

The site consists of the reconstructed fort and its structures (officers' quarters, storehouse, barracks, blacksmith shop, lead miner's cabin, powder magazine, and lead smelter), a restored barn (1859) which serves as visitor center, a restored farmhouse (circa 1860), a sinkhole, a trail system, and a log house (2012), which was built in the style of an original frontier house.

In July 2018, the Mt. Lion Observatory was opened on the grounds of the fort as a joint venture between the Fort Roberdeau Association and Neil Armstrong Planetarium at Altoona Area High School. The site is open May 1 through October 31, and the Observatory hosts public and private groups throughout the year.

Open to the public as an historic site, this historic fort is administered and owned by Blair County.
