= Dominican Order in the United States =

The Dominican Order (Order of Preachers) was first established in the United States by Edward Fenwick in the early 19th century. The first Dominican institution in the United States was the Province of Saint Joseph, which was established in 1805. Additionally, there have been numerous institutes of Dominican Sisters and Nuns.

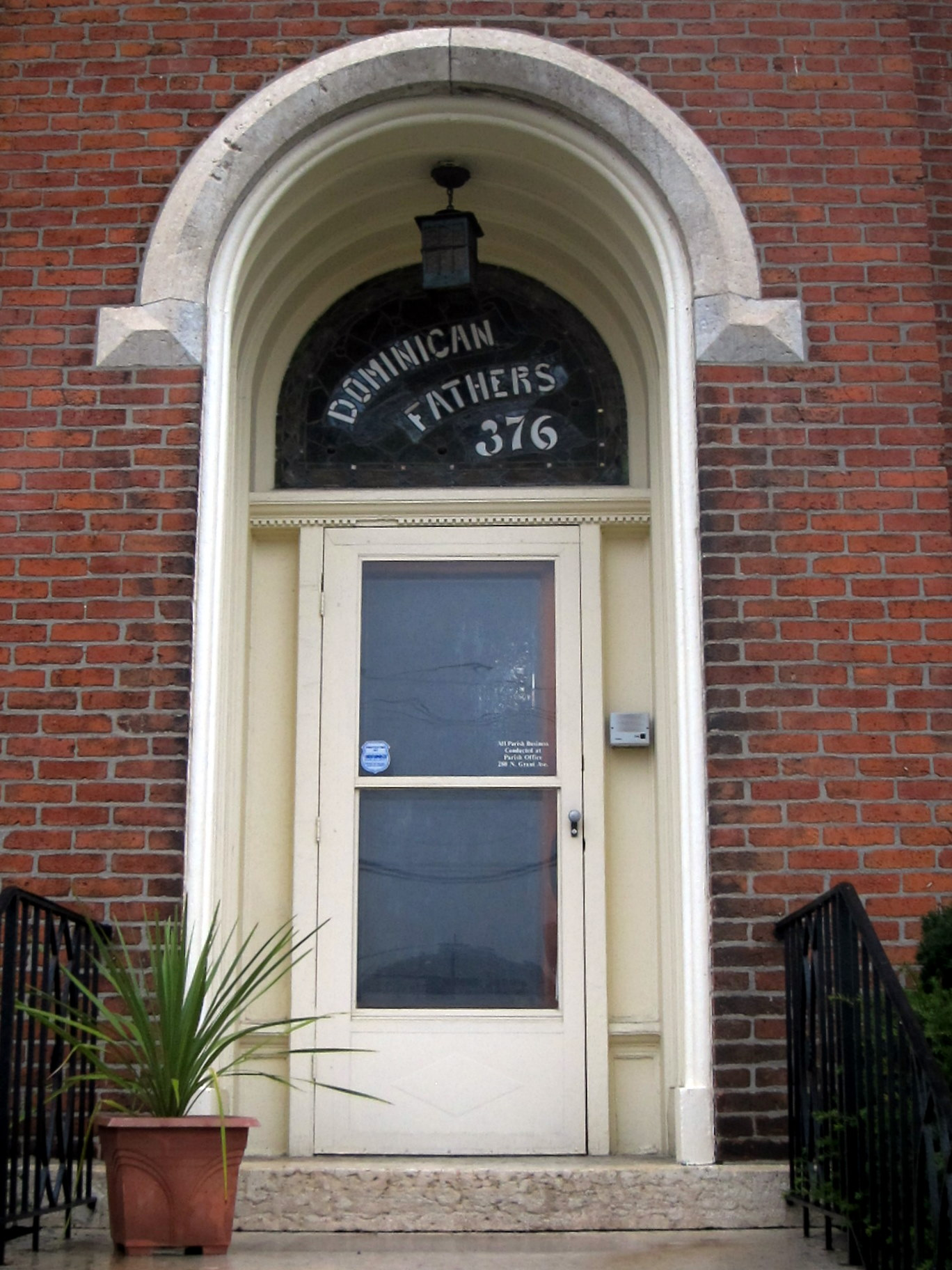
The door to the Dominican Province of St. Joseph at Saint Patrick Church (Columbus, Ohio).

== Friars ==
Map of the four provinces of Dominican Friars in the United States

The Dominican Order (Order of Preachers) has four provinces of Friars established in the United States. Each province is divided according to the states in its geographical region. As of 2016, there are 593 professed members of the US provinces.

=== Province of St. Joseph (Eastern) ===
The Eastern Province, or The Dominican Friars of the Province of Saint Joseph, now covers the northeastern United States (i.e. Kentucky, the original home of the Dominican Order in the United States, and the states to the north and east of eastern Kentucky).

==== Communities and Apostolates of the Province ====
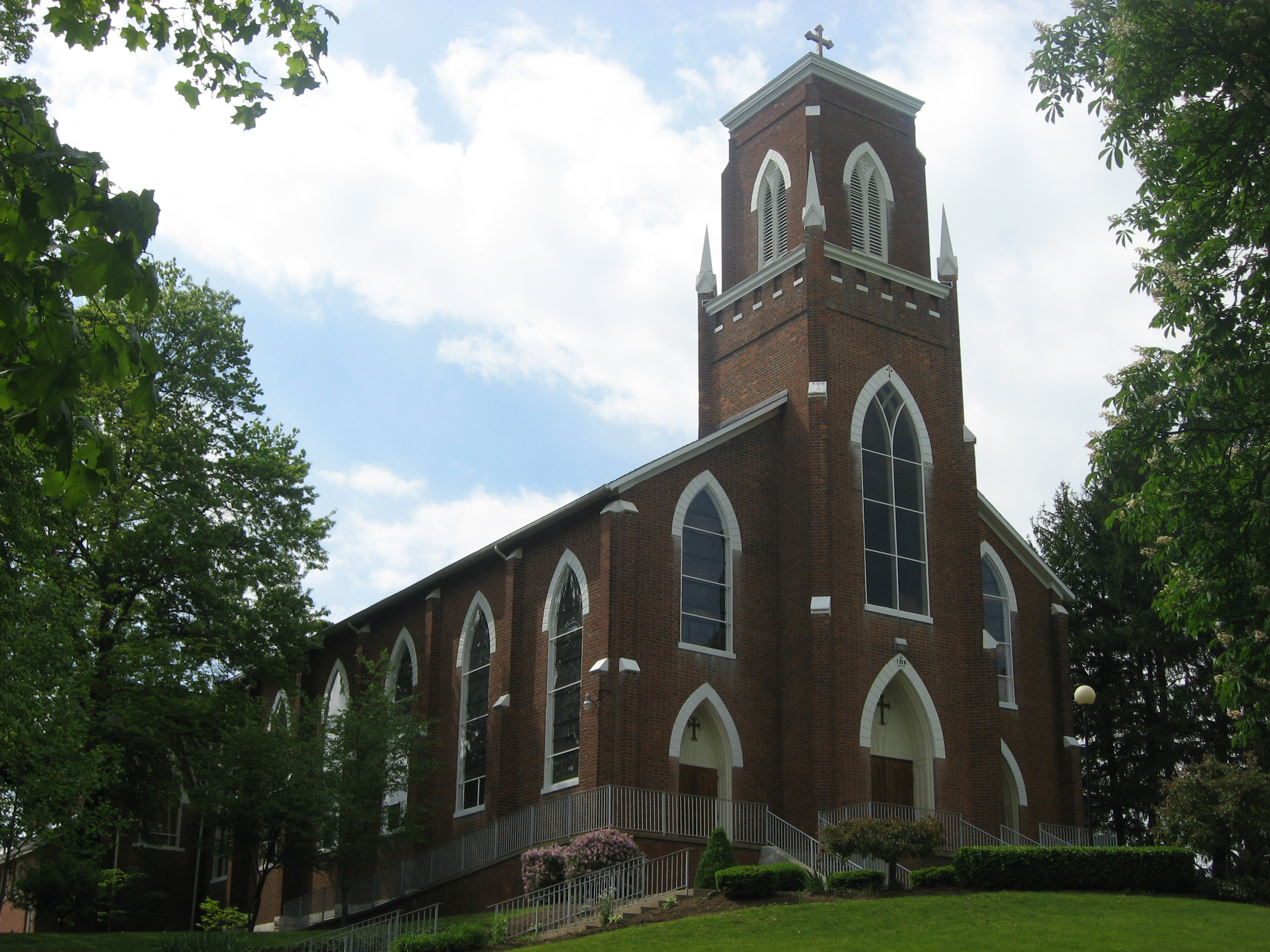
Saint Joseph's Catholic Church (Somerset, Ohio)

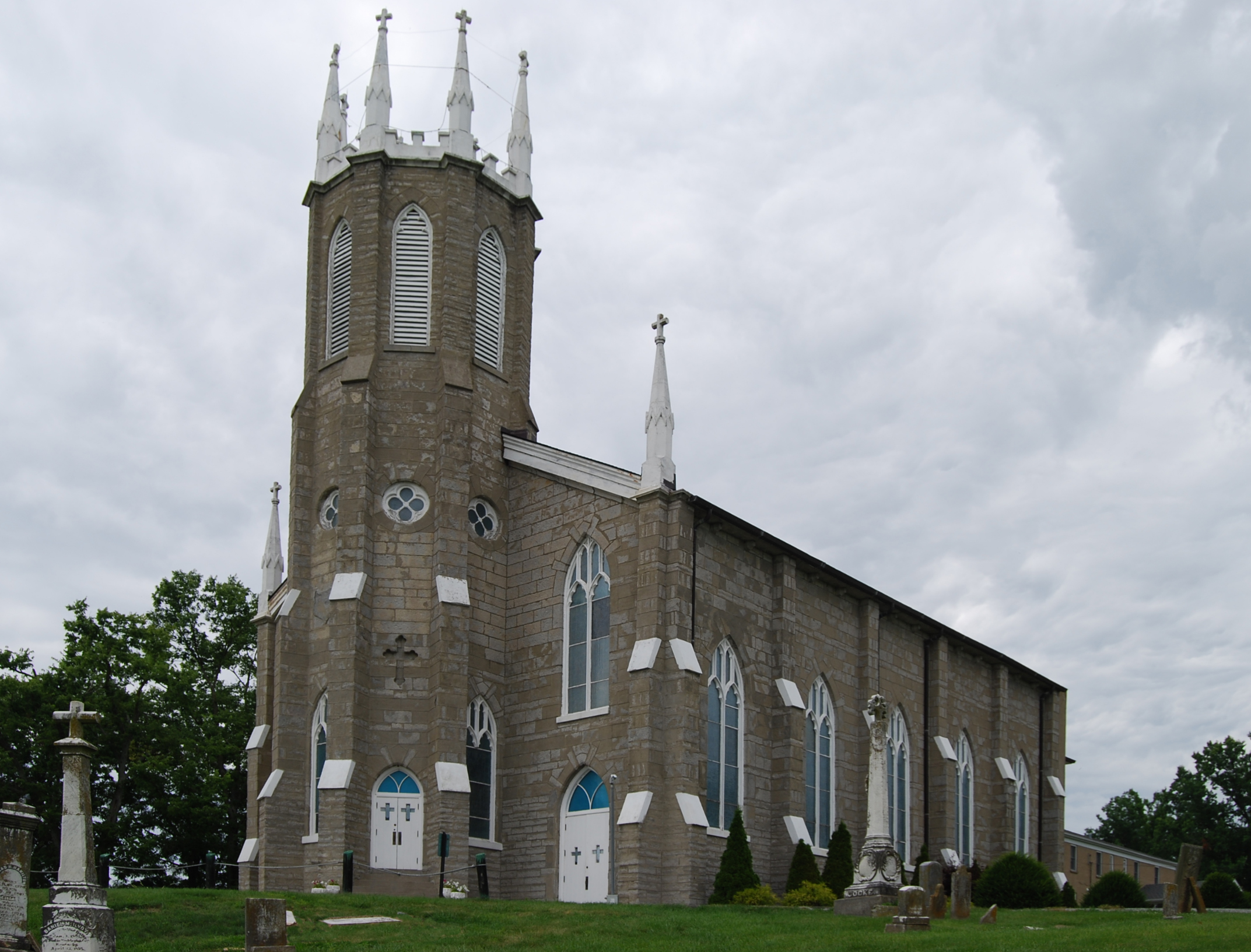
St. Rose Priory, Springfield, Kentucky

- Holy Innocents Parish, Pleasantville, NY
- Dominican House of Studies, Washington, DC
- Sts. Philip and James University Parish, Baltimore, MD
  - The Catholic Community at Johns Hopkins University, Baltimore, MD
- St. Catherine of Siena Priory, New York, NY
- St. Dominic Priory, Washington, DC
- St. Dominic Priory, Youngstown, OH
- St. Gertrude Priory, Cincinnati, OH
- St. Joseph's Parish Greenwich Village, New York, NY
  - Catholic Center, New York University, New York, NY
- St. Joseph Rectory, Somerset, OH
  - Holy Trinity Church, Somerset, OH
- St. Louis Bertrand Priory, Louisville, KY
- St. Patrick Priory, Columbus, OH
- St. Patrick's Rectory, Philadelphia, PA
- St. Rose Priory, Springfield, KY
- St. Denis Parish, Hanover, NH
  - Aquinas House -Catholic Student Center at Dartmouth College
- St. Thomas Aquinas Priory, Charlottesville, VA
- St. Thomas Aquinas Priory, Providence, RI
  - Providence College, Providence, RI
- St. Pius V Parish, Providence, RI
- St. Vincent Ferrer Priory, New York, NY
- Siena House, Nairobi

=== Province of St. Albert the Great (Central) ===
The Central Province, or Province of Saint Albert the Great was established in 1939, and it currently covers the states of Colorado, Illinois, Indiana, Iowa, Kansas, Michigan, Minnesota, Missouri, Nebraska, New Mexico, North Dakota, South Dakota, and Wyoming, as well as Puerto Rico, and serves ten parishes, five campus ministries, three high schools, several houses of studies, publication services, and a variety of social justice ministries within this area. The headquarters is in Chicago. In 2012 the Province completed construction on the new Saint Dominic Priory in St. Louis, Missouri; the new Priory, which can house up to 50 friars, is the House of Studies for the Central and Southern Provinces. As of June 2023, the Prior Provincial is the Very Rev. Louis S. Morrone, OP.

==== Communities and Apostolates of the Province ====
- St. Dominic Priory (House of Studies), St. Louis, MO
- Fenwick High School, Oak Park, IL
- Domestic Violence Outreach, Archdiocese of Chicago
- St. Pius V. Parish, Chicago, IL
- Shrine of St. Jude, Chicago, IL
- New Priory Press, Chicago, IL
- Holy Name of Mary, Chicago, IL
- St. Vincent Ferrer Parish, River Forest, IL
- Trinity High School, River Forest, IL
- St. Paul Catholic Center at Indiana University, Bloomington, IN
- St. Thomas Aquinas Center, Purdue University, West Lafayette, IN
- Aquinas College- Campus Ministry, Grand Rapids, MI
- St. Albert the Great Parish, Minneapolis, MN
  - Holy Rosary Parish, Minneapolis, MN
- University of St Thomas, St Paul, MN
- Aquinas Institute of Theology, St. Louis, MO
- Thomas More Center, Webster, Wisconsin
- St. Dominic Priory, Denver, CO
- Dominican Ecclesial Institute, Albuquerque, NM

=== Province of St. Martin de Porres (Southern) ===
On December 8, 1979, in response to the rapid growth of the Catholic population in the Southern United States, the Order of Preachers approved the foundation of a new Dominican province, the Province of Saint Martin de Porres. The geographic boundaries of the province cover eleven states: Texas, Oklahoma, Arkansas, Louisiana, Mississippi, Tennessee, Alabama, Florida, Georgia, South Carolina, and North Carolina. The friars (priests and brothers) minister in a variety of settings throughout the South, including universities and other educational institutions, campus ministries, Dominican parishes, and itinerant ministries. The Provincial Office (headquarters) is in New Orleans, Louisiana.

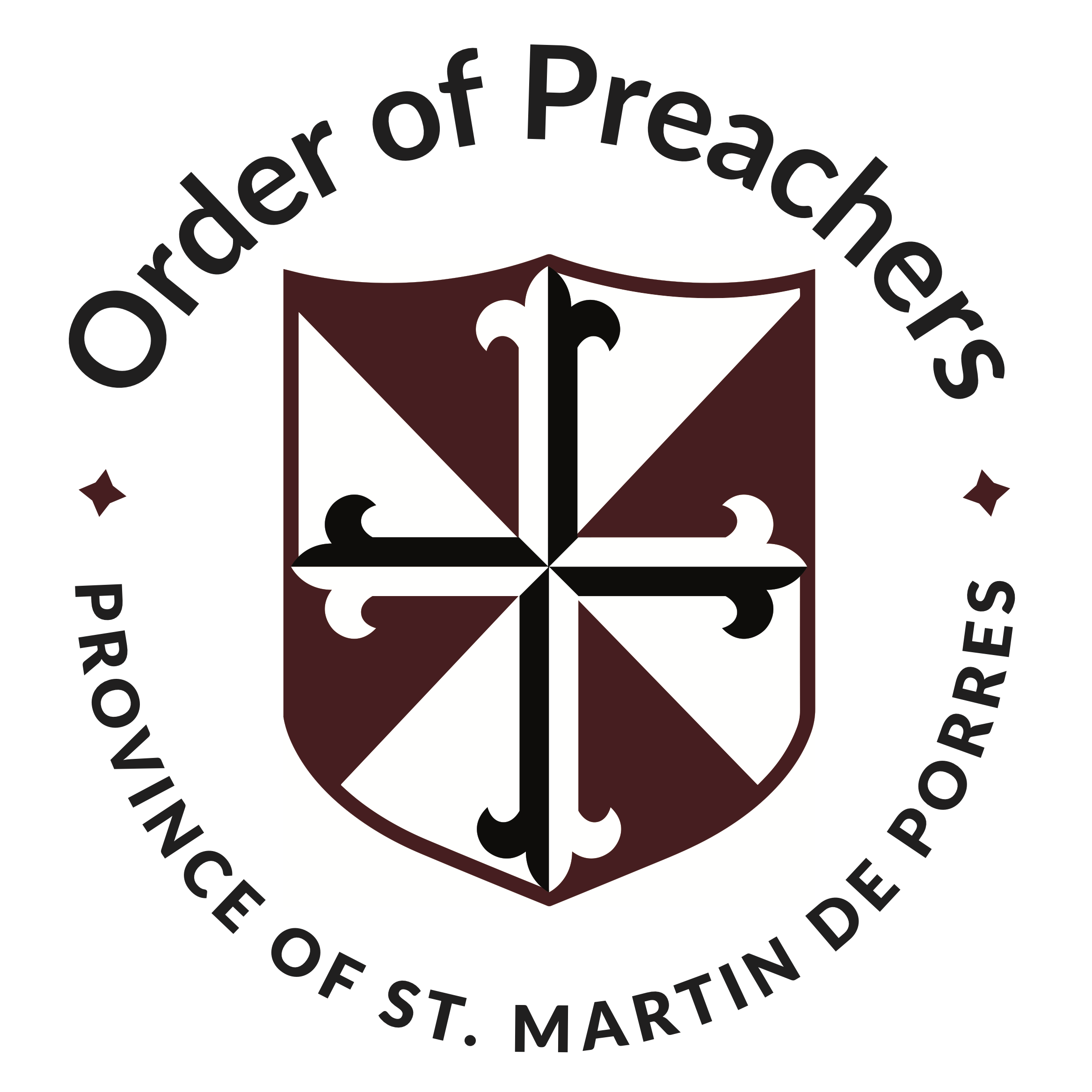
Shield of the Dominican Province of Saint Martin de Porres

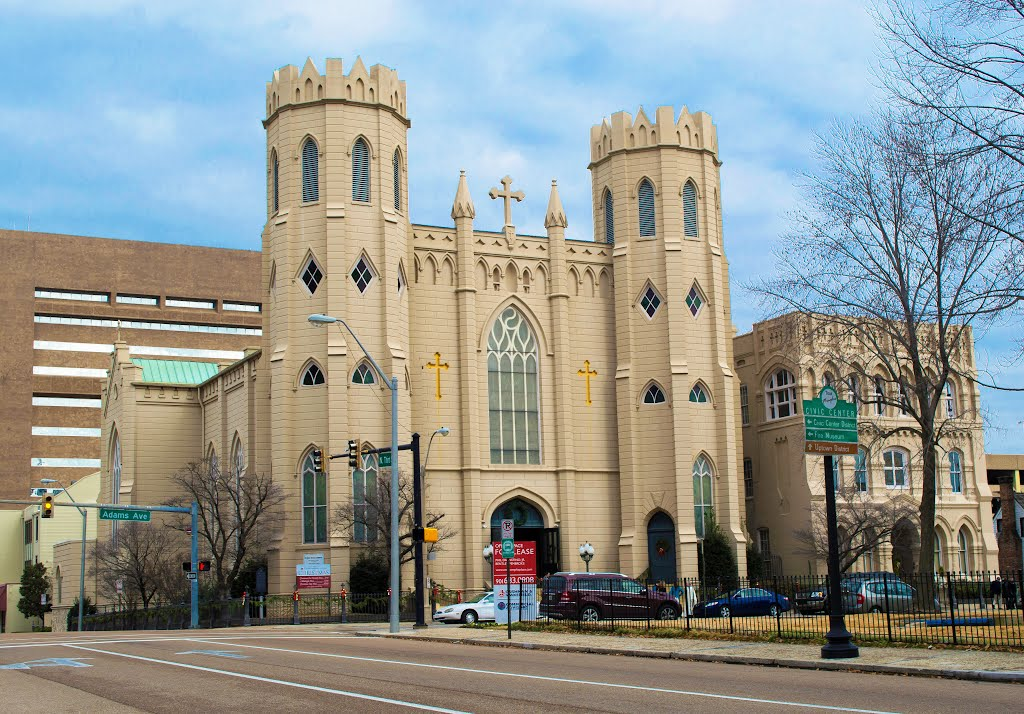
Saint Peter Catholic Church, Memphis, Tennessee

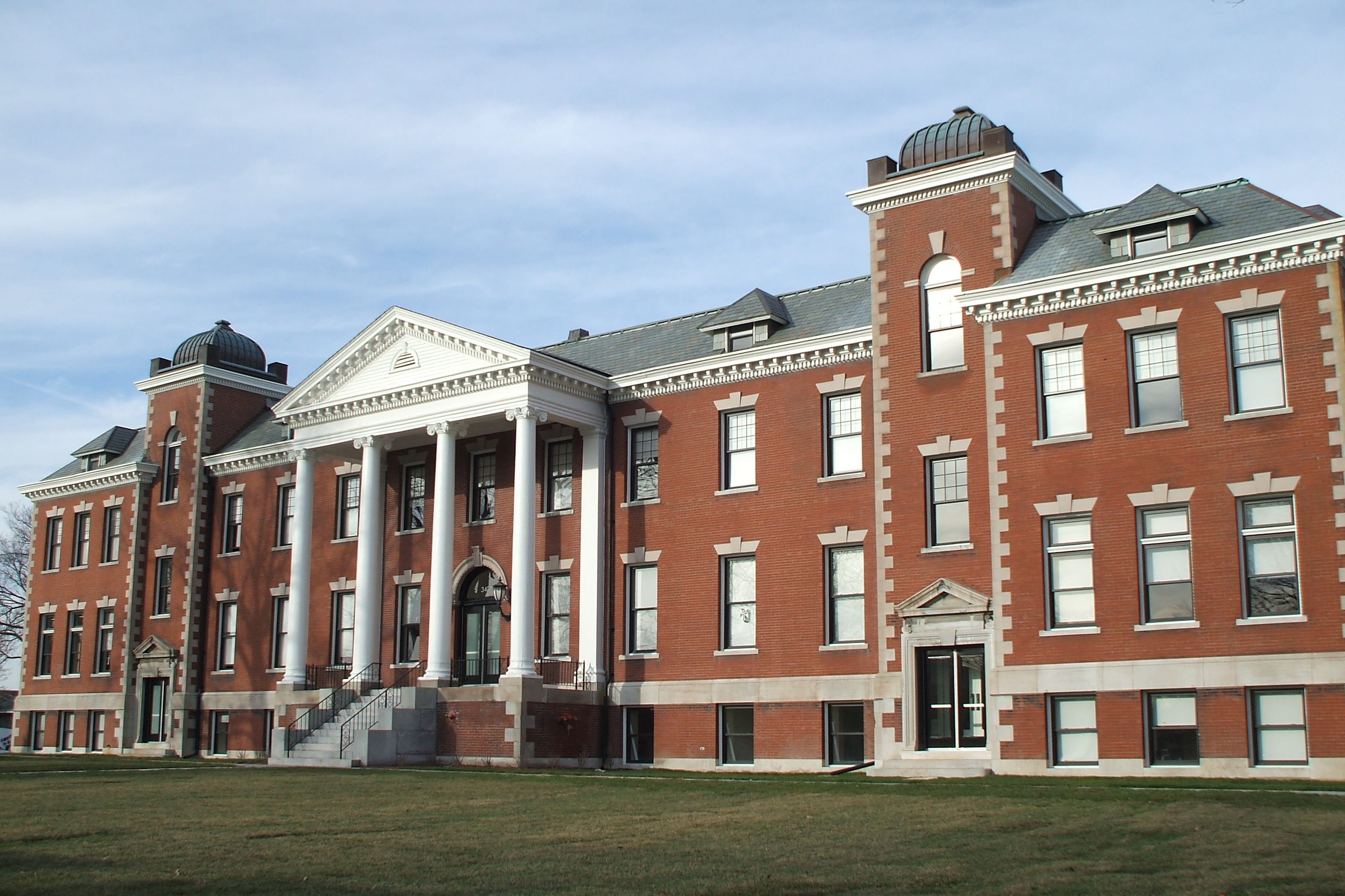
Saint Dominic Priory and Studentate, Saint Louis, Missouri

==== Communities and Apostolates of the Province ====
- Dominican Province of St. Martin de Porres - Official Site
- Dominican Province of St. Martin de Porres - Vocations Site
- Our Lady of Lourdes Catholic Church, Atlanta GA
- St. Albert the Great Chapel and Catholic Student Center, Southeastern Louisiana University, Hammond, LA
- Holy Ghost Catholic Church, Hammond, LA
- Holy Rosary Catholic Church, Houston, TX
- Holy Trinity Seminary, Irving, TX
- St. Albert the Great Priory and Novitiate, Irving, TX
- University of Dallas - Campus Ministry, Irving, TX
- St. Elizabeth Catholic University Parish, Lubbock, TX
- Texas Tech University Catholic Center, Lubbock TX
- St. Martin de Porres National Shrine and Institute, Memphis, TN
- St. Peter Catholic Church, Memphis, TN
- St. Dominic Catholic Church, Miami, FL
- Barry University, Miami Shores, FL
- Barry University - Campus Ministry, Miami Shores, FL
- St. Anthony of Padua Catholic Church, New Orleans, LA
- Xavier University of Louisiana, New Orleans, LA
- Oblate School of Theology, San Antonio, TX
- St. Joseph Abbey and Seminary College, St. Benedict, LA
- Aquinas Institute of Theology, St. Louis, MO
- St. Dominic Priory and Studentate (House of Studies), St. Louis, MO

==== Prior Provincials ====
- 1979–1984 Fr. Bertrand Ebben, O.P.
- 1984–1988 Fr. Thomas M. Cumiskey, O.P.
- 1988–1993 Fr. Paul J. Philibert, O.P.
- 1993–2002 Fr. Alberto Rodriguez, O.P.
- 2002–2010 Fr. Martin J. Gleeson, O.P.
- 2010–2014 Fr. Christopher T. Eggleton, O.P.
- 2014–2022 Fr. Thomas M. Condon, O.P.
- 2022–2026 Fr. Roberto Merced, O.P.
- 2026-Present Fr. Mark Wedig, O.P.

=== Province of the Most Holy Name of Jesus (Western) ===
Coat of arms of the Western Province

The Western Province, or Province of the Most Holy Name of Jesus was first established in 1850 by the co-founders Fr. Sadoc Vilarrasa and Bishop Joseph Alemany. Alemany, who in 1840 completed his studies in sacred theology in Rome at the Dominican College of St. Thomas, the future Pontifical University of Saint Thomas Aquinas, Angelicum, had been appointed Bishop of Monterey and invited Fr. Vilarrasa to accompany him to California. On his way to his new post in California Alemany stopped in Paris and asked Dominican sisters to join him to teach the children of the Forty-niners. Mary Goemaere (1809–1891) volunteered to accompany the new bishop and to begin a school in his new diocese. Within three years, nine women (three American, one Mexican, and five Spanish) joined Sister Mary to form the Congregation of the Most Holy Name. The province was soon reduced to a self-governing Congregation. Finally, in 1912, the congregation was formally re-erected as a province, and currently covers the states of Alaska, Arizona, California, Hawaii, Idaho, Montana, Nevada, Utah, Oregon, and Washington, and serves eight parishes and ten campus ministries within this area. It is headquartered in Oakland, California. As of January 2019, the Prior Provincial is the Very Rev. Christopher Fadok, OP.

==== Communities and Apostolates of the Province ====
- Dominican Province of the Most Holy Name of Jesus - Official Site
- Blessed Sacrament Church, Seattle, WA
- Catholic Community at Stanford, Stanford, CA
- Dominican Mission Foundation, San Francisco, CA
- Dominican School of Philosophy and Theology, Berkeley, CA
- Holy Family Cathedral, Anchorage, AK
- Holy Rosary Catholic Church, Portland, OR
- Newman Hall - Holy Spirit Parish, Berkeley, CA
- Parroquia de Santa Maria de Guadalupe, Poblado Compuertas, Mexicali, Mexico
- Prince of Peace Catholic Newman Center, University of Washington, Seattle, WA
- Rosary Center & Confraternity, Portland, OR
- St. Albert the Great Priory, Oakland, CA
- St. Benedict Lodge, McKenzie Bridge, OR
- St. Catherine of Siena Newman Center, University of Utah, Salt Lake City, UT
- St. Dominic's Catholic Church, Benicia, CA
- St. Dominic's Catholic Church, Los Angeles, CA
- St. Dominic Cemetery, Benicia, CA
- St. Dominic Church, San Francisco, CA
- St. Raymond Catholic Church, Menlo Park, CA
- St. Thomas Aquinas Newman Center, University of Nevada - Las Vegas (UNLV), Las Vegas, NV
- St. Thomas More Catholic Church, University of Oregon, Eugene, OR
- St. Thomas More Catholic Newman Center, University of Arizona, Tucson, AZ

== Dominican sisters and nuns ==
Numerous monasteries and congregations of Dominican sisters and nuns have been established in the United States since the establishment of the Congregation of St. Catherine of Siena in 1822.

=== Monasteries of nuns ===
1880: Newark, NJ (Closed)
1889: Corpus Christi Monastery, Hunts Point, Bronx, NY
1891: Union City, West Hoboken, NJ (Closed)
1897: Dominican Sisters of the Perpetual Rosary, Milwaukee, WI
1899: Catonsville, MD (Closed)
1900: Camden, NJ (Closed)
1905: Monastery of Our Lady of the Rosary, Buffalo, NY (Closed)
1906: Detroit, MI, moved to Monastery of the Blessed Sacrament, Farmington Hills, MI
1909: La Crosse, WI, moved to St. Dominic's Monastery, Linden, VA
1915: Albany, NY (Closed)
1915: Cincinnati, OH (Closed)
1919: Dominican Monastery of Our Lady of the Rosary, Summit, NJ
1921: Corpus Christi Monastery, Menlo Park, CA
1921: Los Angeles, CA (Closed)
1922: Monastery of the Mother of God, West Springfield, MA
1925: Lancaster, PA (Closed - merged with the Bronx)
1925: Syracuse, NY
1944: Dominican Monastery of St. Jude, Marbury, AL
1945: Elmira, NY, moved to Monastery of Mary the Queen, Girard, IL
1945: Monastery of the Infant Jesus, Lufkin, TX
1947: Monastery of Our Lady of Grace, North Guilford, CT

=== Congregations of sisters ===
1822: Congregation of St. Catharine of Siena, St. Catharine, KY (now Dominican Sisters of Peace)
1830: Congregation of St. Mary of the Springs, Columbus, OH (now Dominican Sisters of Peace)
1849: Congregation of the Most Holy Rosary, Sinsinawa, WI
1850: Congregation of the Most Holy Name, San Rafael, CA
1853: Congregation of the Holy Cross, Amityville, NY

1860: Dominican Sisters of St. Mary, New Orleans, LA (now Dominican Sisters of Peace)
1860: Dominican Sisters of St. Cecilia, Nashville, TN
1862: Congregation of St. Catherine of Siena, Racine, WI
1869: Dominican Sisters of Hope, Newburgh, NY

1873: Congregation of Our Lady of the Sacred Heart, Springfield, IL
1876: Dominican Sisters of Hope, Ossining, NY
1876: Congregation of Our Lady of the Rosary, Sparkill, NY
1880: Congregation of St. Catherine de Ricci, Elkins Park, PA (now Dominican Sisters of Peace)
1881: Congregation of the Sacred Heart, Caldwell, NJ
1882: Congregation of the Sacred Heart, Houston, TX
1888: Congregation of the Queen of the Rosary, Mission San Jose, CA
1888: Congregation of St. Thomas Aquinas, Tacoma, WA

1890: Congregation of St. Dominic, Blauvelt, NY
1891: Fall River, MA
1894: Congregation of Our Lady of the Sacred Heart
1898: Congregation of St. Rose of Lima, Hawthorne, NY

1902: Congregation of the Immaculate Conception, Great Bend, KS (now Dominican Sisters of Peace)
1906: Sisters of Charity of the Presentation of the BVM, Fall River, MA
1911: Congregation of St. Catherine of Siena, Kenosha, WI
1920: Maryknoll Sisters of St. Dominic, Maryknoll, NY
1923: Congregation of the Most Holy Rosary, Adrian, MI
1923: Congregation of Holy Cross, Edmonds, WA (merged with Adrian Dominicans)
1923: Congregation of St. Rose of Lima, Oxford, MI (now Dominican Sisters of Peace)
1927: Eucharistic Missionaries of St. Dominic, New Orleans, LA (now Dominican Sisters of Peace)
1929: Congregation of the Immaculate Heart of Mary, Akron, OH (now Dominican Sisters of Peace)

1946: Hartford, Ct
1950: Puerto Rico
1951: Abbeville, LA
1955: Dominican Mission Sisters, Chicago, IL
1997: Dominican Sisters of Mary, Mother of the Eucharist, Ann Arbor, MI

2009: Dominican Sisters of Peace

== Dominican laity ==
From the earliest days of the Order, lay men and women have been a major part of the Dominicans. Both married or single, lay Dominicans are devoted to and have a strong passion for the Dominican mission and way of life. Lay Dominicans often have a direct role in the preaching mission. Many pursue degrees in theology or liturgy, are engaged in justice ministries, and participate in St. Dominic's call to contemplate and share with others the fruits of their contemplation.

Lay Dominicans make promises to follow The Rule of the Lay Chapters of St. Dominic and the Particular Directory of the province in which they live. They meet in community regularly and participate with the friars, nuns, and sisters, as well as the Church in general, in praying the Liturgy of the Hours. They engage in active apostolates such as letter-writing on issues of peace and justice, ministry to the poor, liturgical ministries, teaching, authorship, and spiritual counseling. They endeavor to live lives of simplicity and generosity.

== Dominican Young Adults, USA ==
In the summer of 2008, members who attended the Preaching in Action College conference, held a reunion at Edgewood College in Madison, WI. While there, work was done to form the Dominican Young Adults, USA (DYA, USA). Local chapters are present in Dominican colleges, universities, parishes, and other local areas with Dominican influence. Local chapters of 18- to 30-year-olds center meetings around the four pillars of Dominican life: community, prayer, study, and preaching. They have a mentor who is a member of the Dominican Family. Each chapter also has a young adult leader. Every two years, national gatherings are held. DYA, USA was officially recognized at the 2009 International Gathering of International Dominican Youth Movement (IDYM) in Fatima, Portugal.

== Notable Dominicans in America ==
- Benedict Ashley
- Luis de Cancer
- Edward Fenwick
- James Whelan
- John T. McNicholas
- Joseph Augustine Di Noia
- Joseph Sadoc Alemany
- Richard Pius Miles
- Samuel Charles Mazzuchelli
- Mary Dominic Dowling
- Mary Alphonse Hawthorne
- Mary Joseph Rogers
- Samuel Henderson
- Paschal Salisbury
