= Broad Avenue Historic District =

Historic district in Pennsylvania, United States

- U.S. National Register of Historic Places
- U.S. Historic district
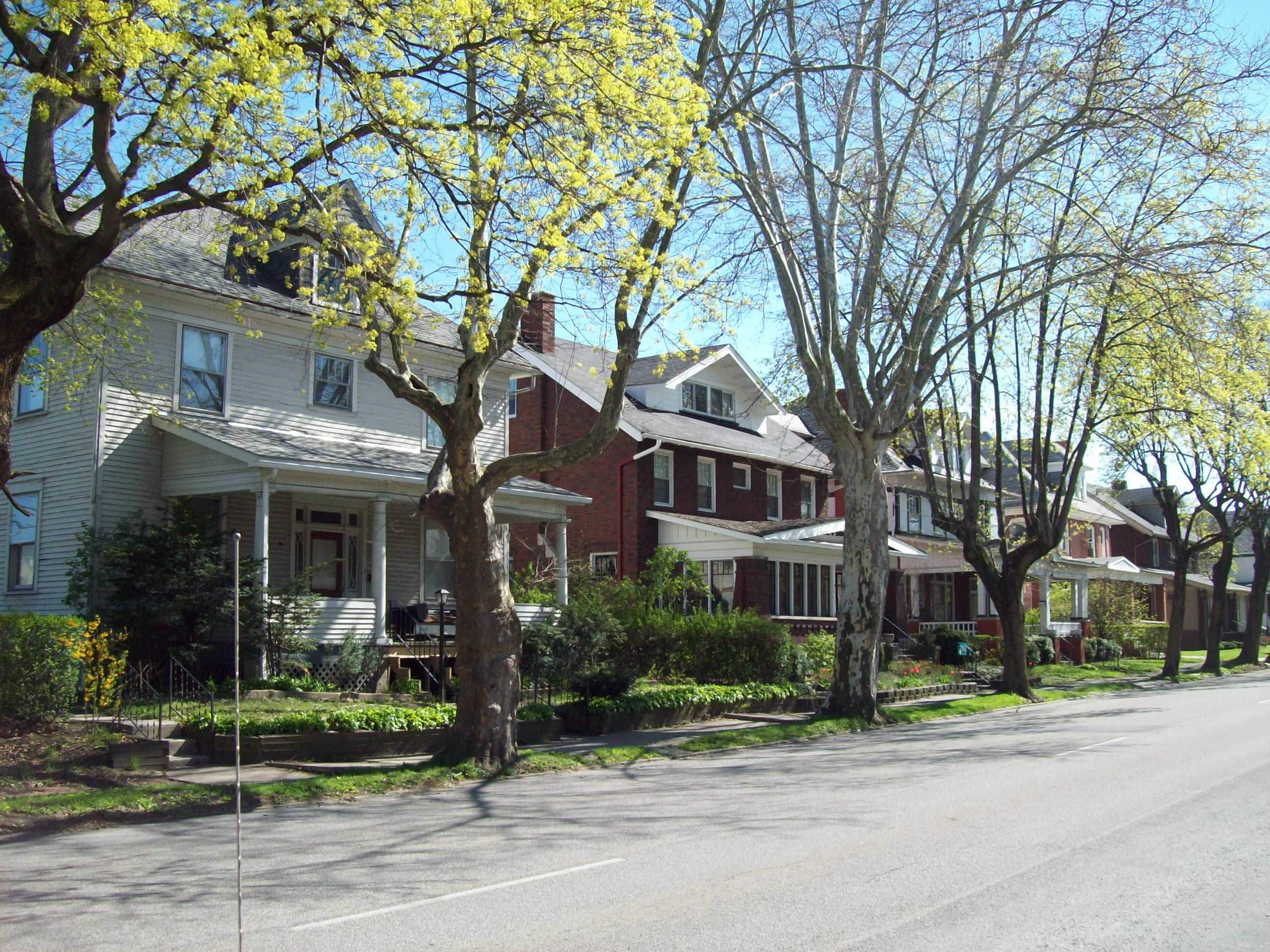
- Broad Avenue Historic District, April 2012

- Location within Pennsylvania Location within the United States
- Location: Roughly along Broad Ave., from 23rd to 31st Sts., Altoona, Pennsylvania
- Coordinates: 40°30′8″N 78°24′46″W
- Area: 30 acres (12 ha)
- Architect: Multiple, including Beezer Brothers
- Architectural style: Colonial Revival, Italianate
- NRHP reference No.: 02000806
- Added to NRHP: July 25, 2002

Broad Avenue Historic District is a national historic district located at Altoona, Blair County, Pennsylvania. The district includes 140 contributing buildings in a residential area of Altoona. The buildings were primarily built between 1880 and 1927, and reflect a number of popular architectural styles including Colonial Revival and Italianate. The area was developed as an early streetcar-oriented development in Altoona. Non-residential buildings include the Broad Avenue Presbyterian Church (c. 1895) and Broad Avenue United Methodist Church (1927).

It was added to the National Register of Historic Places in 2002.
