= Beezer Brothers =

American architects (1869-c. 1930)

Practice information
- Partners: Louis Beezer; Michael J. Beezer
- Founded: 1892
- Dissolved: 1932
- Location: Altoona, Pennsylvania (1892–1899); Pittsburgh, Pennsylvania (1900–1907); Seattle, Washington (1907–1932); San Francisco, California (branch, 1923–1929)

Significant works and honors
- Buildings: O'Kane Building; Blessed Sacrament Church (Seattle)

Louis Beezer
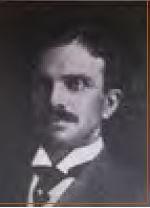
- Louis Beezer c. 1907
- Born: July 6, 1869; Bellefonte, Pennsylvania, U.S.
- Died: January 2, 1929 (aged 59); San Francisco, California
- Occupation: Architect
- Spouse: Annie M. Cole (m. 1892)
- Children: 3

Michael J. Beezer
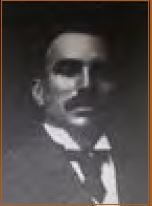
- Michael Beezer c. 1907
- Born: July 6, 1869; Bellefonte, Pennsylvania, U.S.
- Died: September 15, 1933 (aged 64); Seattle, Washington
- Occupation: Architect
- Spouse: Emma Renaut
- Children: 1

The Beezer Brothers were American architects active from the late 19th-century to the Great Depression. They were twins, who practiced together in western Pennsylvania before moving to Seattle, Washington in 1907 to participate in the city's rapid growth brought on by the Klondike Gold Rush. Best known for the many Catholic churches they designed, they also worked on domestic residences and municipal buildings. Their work on the west coast, while concentrated in Seattle, can be found from Los Angeles to San Francisco to Alaska, and inland to Montana. At least one church and two buildings are individually listed on the National Register of Historic Places, and several other buildings are contributing properties to several different National Historic Districts.

== Background ==
Louis Beezer and Michael J. Beezer were born July 6, 1869, in Bellefonte, Pennsylvania, to Joseph and Catherine Beezer. Their father was a German immigrant. Louis worked in construction and had become a foreman in Altoona by age 21. He studied architecture for a few years in Pittsburgh before returning to Altoona where he and Michael started their partnership in 1892 and practiced there for seven years until moving to Pittsburgh in 1900. where they designed homes and churches for the next seven years.

Between 1900 and 1906, they designed five brick commercial buildings in western Pennsylvania. Each included elaborate terra-cotta ornamentation on the top story and cornice. The first floor of all but one was made entirely of limestone. These building included a fireproof flooring system that the Beezer's had patented. The system replaced steel, which twisted and collapsed in the extreme heat of a fire, with hollow clay tiles to support the floors. Although these building were similar, the Beezers were known to design each project uniquely. The pair frequently acted as construction managers in addition to architects on their projects where they oversaw daily, on-site, work activities, work that is usually performed by construction firms. They also designed homes and churches in Pittsburgh before closing the office and relocating to Seattle, Washington, in 1907. The city was experiencing tremendous growth at the time. While Seattle was their base, projects were located from Hollywood, California, to Alaska. In 1923, Louis opened a branch office in San Francisco, California. The office closed six years later upon his death in 1929. Michael stayed in Seattle and ran that office until he retired in 1932, but did little noteworthy after Louis left.

In addition to homes, commercial buildings, churches, a steamship terminal, they also designed at least six banks. Michael was reported to be honored at a 1912 opening of a bank he designed in Montana by being allowed to make the first deposit.

== Personal life ==
Michael was married to Emman Renaut, with whom he had one child, Ross J. Beezer. Louis was married to Annie M. Beezer (née Cole). They had three children, Harold, Raymond, and Mary.

== Pennsylvania projects ==
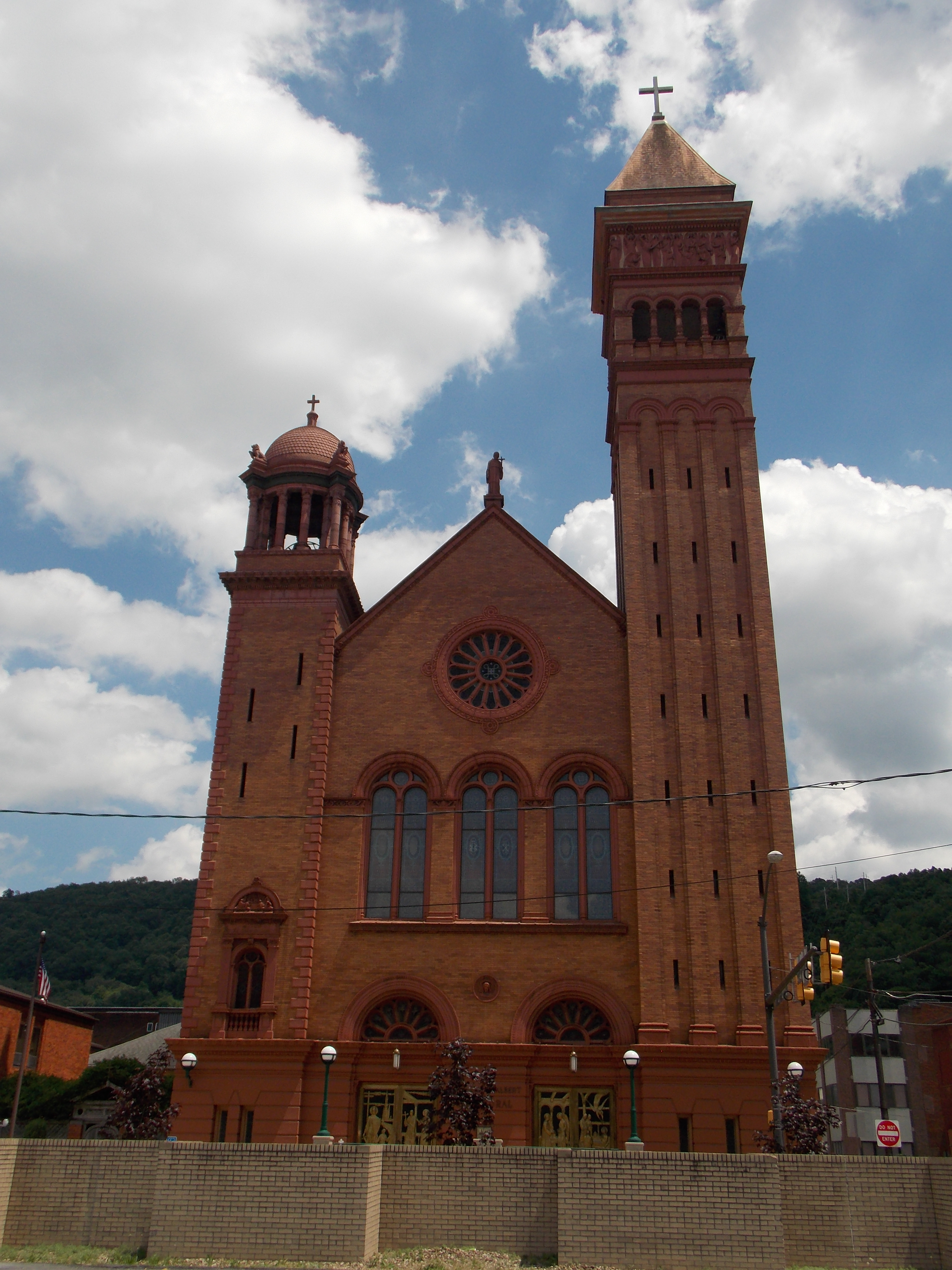
St. John Gualbert Cathedral

- Louis Beezer House (1895), Altoona (see HABS PA-5900)
- Michael J. Beezer House (1895), Altoona (see HABS PA-5901)
- D. F. O'Rorke House, 2000 Union Avenue, Altoona, currently A Quaint Corner, a children's museum.
- St. John Gualbert Cathedral 117 Clinton Street, Johnstown, Pennsylvania (1895). A local landmark and significant early building in the brothers’ careers, the building used structural steel allowing for thinner walls of decorative terra cotta. The church is 124 feet (38 m) long and 47 feet (14 m) high with a 165-foot-tall (50 m) corner tower. The tower is patterned after the tenth-century Campanile of San Marco in Venice, Italy, which collapsed in 1902, making this tower older than the more famous reconstruction in Italy. The interior of the church has fluted pilasters with Corinthian capitals, arched windows and a coved and coffered ceiling.
- Llyswen Station (1895–1896), 2185 Logan Boulevard, Altoona. A station on the Altoona and Logan Valley Electric Railway, a 6-mile (9.7 km) line between Altoona and Hollidaysburg that was completed in 1892. The station is made with river rock and the upper story has a distinctive pyramidal tower.
- Pennsylvania National Bank Building (c. 1900), 3480 Butler Street, Pittsburgh (Beaux-Arts)
- Saint John the Baptist Church, Pittsburgh, currently Church Brew Works
- Clearfield County National Bank and Dimeling Hotel (1904), West Market and North 2nd streets NW, Clearfield, Pennsylvania. The stone first floor with arched windows is followed by upper floors of red brick, with contrasting three-sided bay windows. This bank has a rare plaque denoting the firm.
- First National Bank of Tyrone (demolished)
- The home of U.S. Representative (six terms) George Franklin Huff in Greensburg, Pennsylvania
- The home of Lloyd B. Huff, Greensburg
- The home of William Augustus Huff, Greensburg
- The summer mansion of William Thaw Jr., son of the railroad magnate William Thaw Sr., in Loretto, Pennsylvania (1897–1902). The 20-room Tudor Revival house, "Elmhurst", on 130 acres (53 ha) cost $150,000.
- Several of their projects are contributing properties of the Llyswen Historic District and the Broad Avenue Historic District on the National Register of Historic Places.

== Seattle projects ==
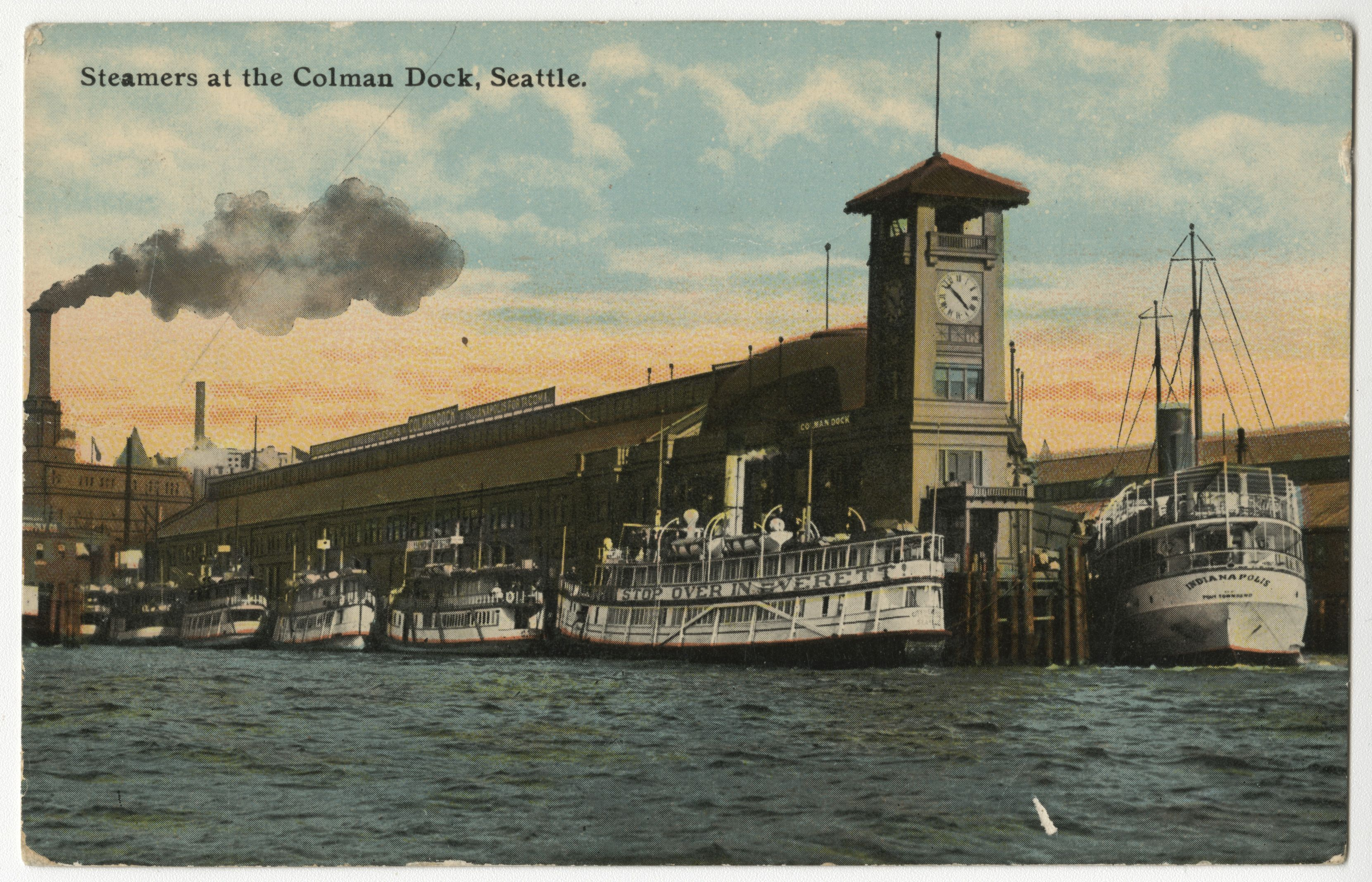
Colman Dock

Early Seattle projects included:

- Colman Dock (1908–1909), the new steamship terminal
- The Oliver D. Fisher house (1908–1909) on southwest Capitol Hill
- The Homer L. Hillman house (1908–1909) on southwest Capitol Hill
- The Leary Building (later the Insurance Building, 1906–1910, destroyed) downtown Seattle
- An apartment building for Mr. and Mrs. John B. Beltinck (1908–1909) located at 319 16th Avenue

Many significant projects (churches, rectories, and schools) were for the Seattle Roman Catholic diocese, including:

- The Immaculate Conception School (1909–1910) at 810 18th Avenue
- The Blessed Sacrament Church (1909-1911, 1922–1925) at 5049 9th Avenue NE
- The Immaculate Conception rectory (1910–1914) at 820 18th Avenue
- The Cathedral School (1911–1912) at 803 Terry Avenue
- Our Lady of Mount Virgin Church (1915) at 1531 Bradner Place S
- The Society of Jesus rectory (1919–1921) at 730 18th Avenue E
- Saint Joseph School (1922–1923) at 720 18th Avenue

== Other projects (Seattle office) ==
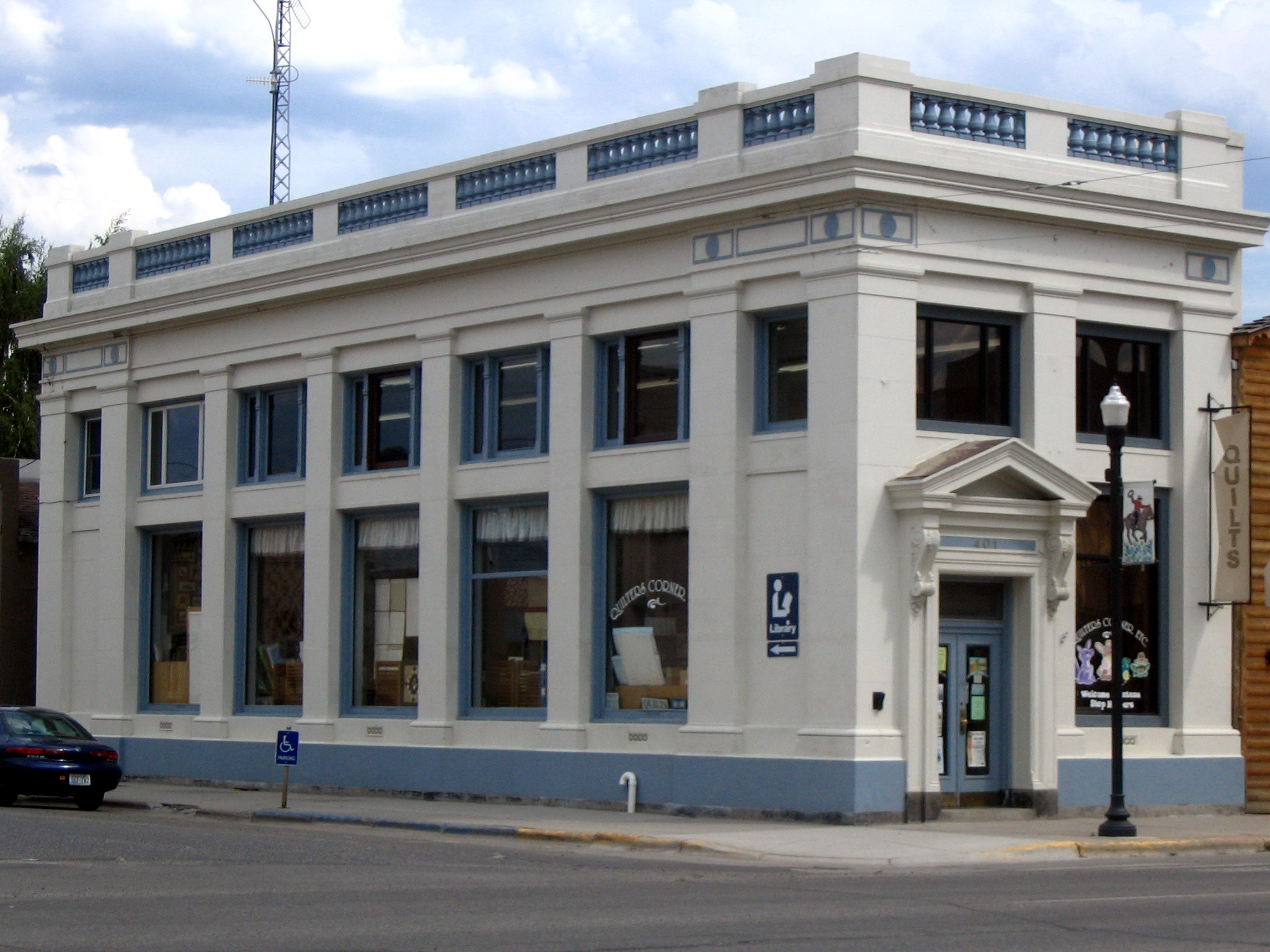
Larabie Brothers Bank

- American Veterans Building-Hoquiam, 307 7th St Hoquiam, Washington, listed on the NRHP
- O'Kane Building, 115 NW Oregon Ave. Bend, Oregon, listed on the NRHP
- Baker Boyer Bank, (c. 1910), Walla Walla, Washington, considered the city's first skyscraper
- First Savings Bank (1911), Albany, Oregon listed on the NRHP as part of Albany downtown historic district.
- S.C. Young Building (1911), Albany, Oregon listed on the NRHP as part of Albany downtown historic district.
- Saint Mary Hospital (1909–1916), Walla Walla, Washington
- Larabie Brothers Bank, (1912), Deer Lodge, Montana (Michael J. Beezer)
- First Presbyterian Church, Deer Lodge, Montana (apparently also known as Mary Ann Larabee Memorial Presbyterian Church).
- St. Josephs Hospital, Deer Lodge, Montana
- Bishop Edward J. O'Dea, High School. 802 Terry Lane, Seattle (1923–1924) (Roman Catholic Archdiocese of Seattle), a significant, extant example of the Gothic Revival style in Seattle.
- First National Bank of Walla Walla, considered their "bank masterpiece"

== Other projects (San Francisco office) ==
- St. Dominic's Catholic Church (San Francisco) (1923–1929)
- Church of the Blessed Sacrament (1926–1929) in Hollywood, California, together with architect Thomas Franklin Powers, which has also been known as "Church of the Stars". This Italian Renaissance architecture church, with a 223-foot campanile, has interior design based on those of the Basilica di San Clemente and the Basilica of Saint Paul Outside the Walls, both in Rome. "The church speaks of Hollywood's Golden Age. The subsequent construction of additional Catholic churches in the area has provided some competition for the moniker “Church of the Stars.” It was claimed to be the second largest church on the West Coast when it opened.

== Publications ==
- Architecture, Practical and Theoretical (1894)
- A collection of designs for "Residences, Business and Public Buildings" (1899)
