= Llyswen Historic District =

Historic district in Pennsylvania, United States

- U.S. National Register of Historic Places
- U.S. Historic district
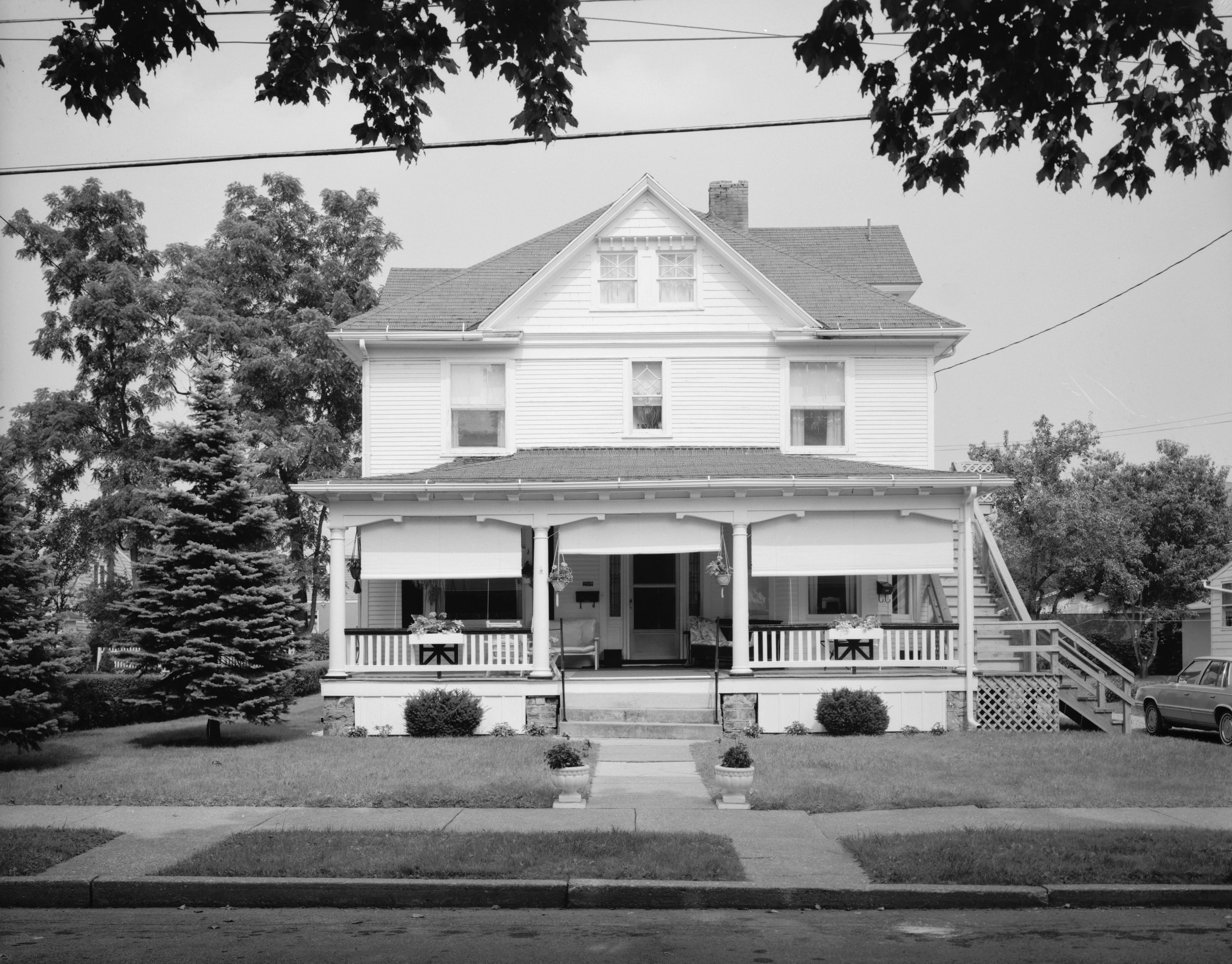
- David G. and Margaret Stewart House, August 1989

- Location within Pennsylvania Location within the United States
- Location: Coleridge, Logan, Aldrich bounded by Mill Run and Ward, Altoona, Pennsylvania
- Coordinates: 40°28′59″N 78°24′25″W
- Area: 60 acres (24 ha)
- Built by: Beezer Brothers others
- Architect: Multiple, including Beezer Brothers, Patrick W. Finn, Julian Millard, Frederick J. Shollar
- Architectural style: Colonial Revival, Queen Anne
- NRHP reference No.: 02000807
- Added to NRHP: July 25, 2002

Llyswen Historic District is a national historic district located at Altoona in Blair County, Pennsylvania, United States. The district includes 166 contributing buildings in a residential area of Altoona. The buildings are primarily single-family dwellings built between 1895 and 1940, and reflect a number of popular architectural styles including Colonial Revival and Queen Anne. Notable non-residential buildings include the Llyswen Methodist Episcopal Church, Ward Avenue United Presbyterian Church, Baker Elementary School and Llyswen Station.

Llyswen Station is a historic railway station designed by the Beezer Brothers.

The district was added to the National Register of Historic Places in 2002.
