= Blessed Sacrament Church (Seattle) =

Historic Catholic church in Washington, United States

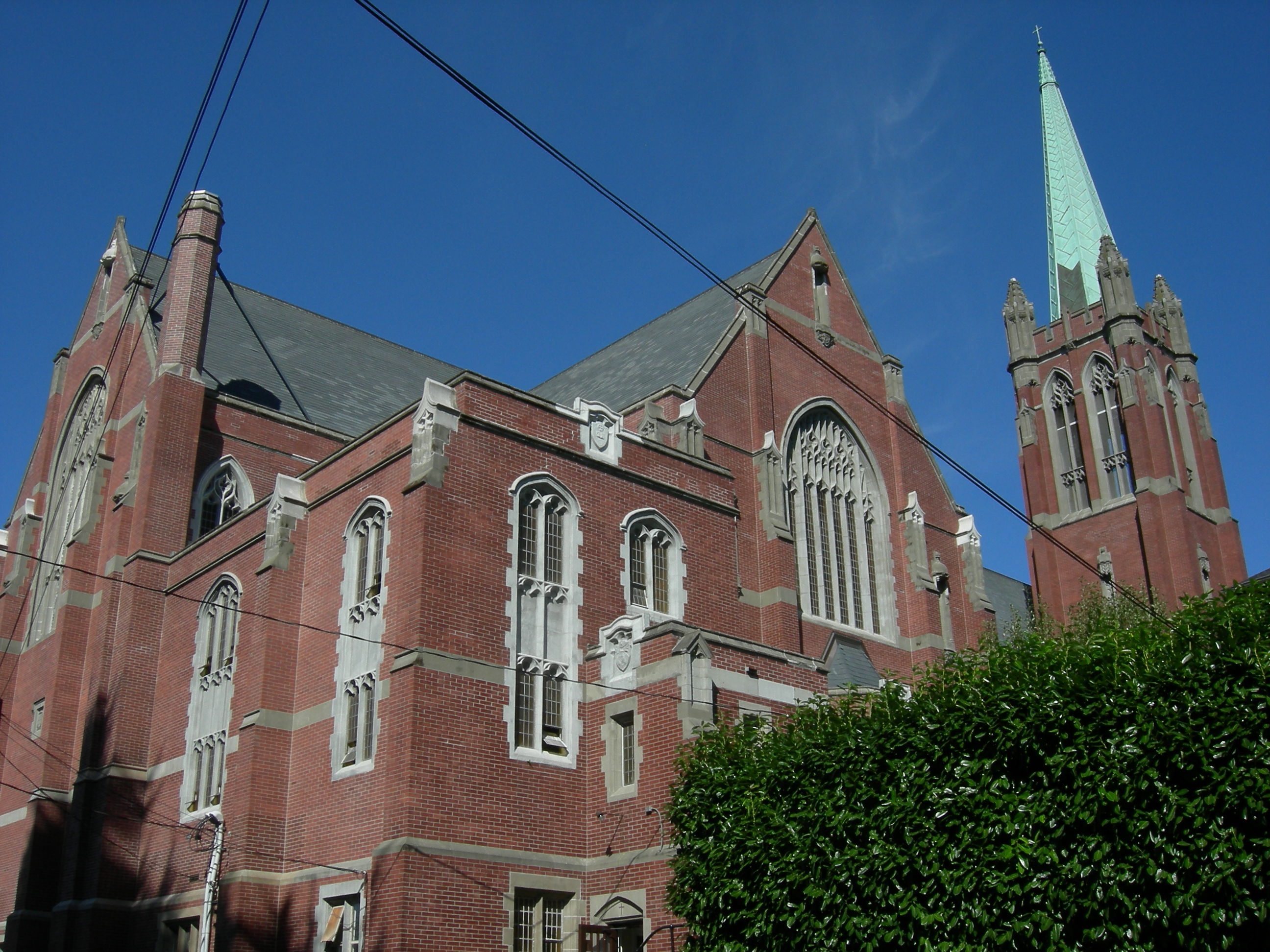
- View from 8th Ave NE
- Blessed Sacrament Church
- 47°40′00″N 122°19′03″W
- Location: Seattle, Washington
- Denomination: Catholic
- Religious order: Dominican

History
- Founded: December 6, 1908
- Founder(s): Fr. Francis Driscoll, O.P.
- Dedicated: October 4, 1925

Architecture
- Heritage designation: National Register of Historic Places, Seattle Landmark
- Designated: January 12, 1984 (NRHP); March 2, 1981 (Seattle)
- Style: Neo-Gothic

Administration
- Archdiocese: Seattle
- Deanery: North Seattle
- Parish: Blessed Sacrament

Clergy
- Vicar(s): Fr. Francis Le, O.P.
- Pastor(s): Fr. Dominic David Maichrowicz, O.P.

- Church of the Blessed Sacrament, Priory, and School
- U.S. National Register of Historic Places
- NRHP reference No.: 84003479
- Added to NRHP: January 12, 1984

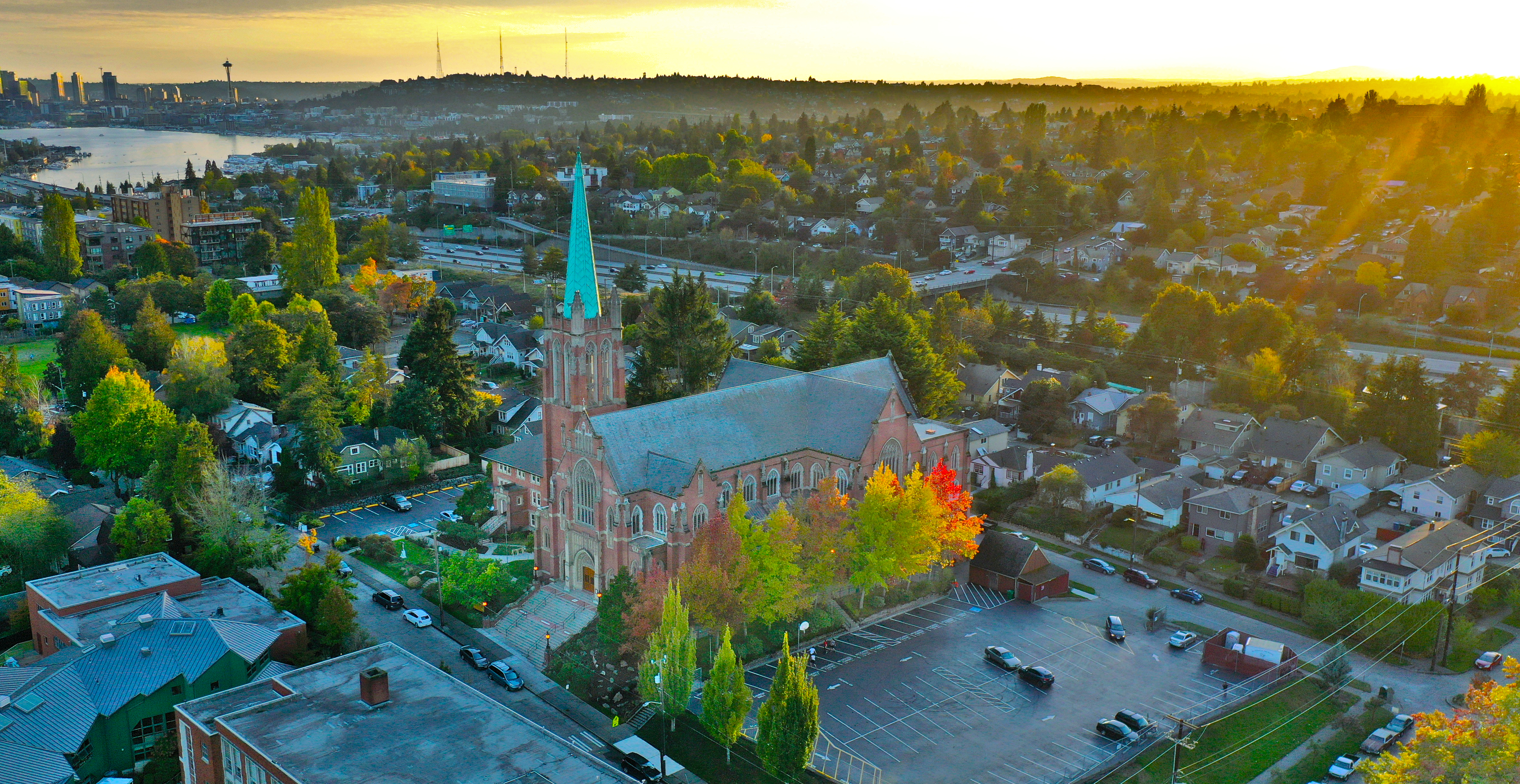
View from a DJI Mavic 2 Pro in October of 2020.

The Church of the Blessed Sacrament is a Roman Catholic parish within the Archdiocese of Seattle serving Seattle's University District. It is the only parish in the archdiocese to be owned and operated by the Order of Preachers and is within the jurisdiction of the Western Dominican Province. The church's current prior is Fr. Dominic Briese, and the current pastor is Fr. Dominic David Maichrowicz.

The church building, its priory, and its parish school building were added to the National Register of Historic Places in 1984 as Church of the Blessed Sacrament, Priory, and School. Damage from the 2001 Nisqually earthquake led to extensive repairs in 2010. It ministers to the Catholic undergraduate and graduate students at the University of Washington through the Prince of Peace Newman Center, which is the fifth-oldest Newman Center and the first to be run by the Dominican Order. Fr. Marcin Szymański is the current pastor of the Newman Center, and Fr. Chrysostom Mijinke, is the parochial vicar. As of 2019, FOCUS missionaries have been serving the parish and Newman Center's ministries as well.

The church is unique among the Order of Preachers because of its practice of appointing yearly Dominican seminarians to serve as "student brothers" for one year, working with both the pastor of Blessed Sacrament and the chaplains at the University of Washington Newman Center to deliver catechesis to a variety of public audiences.

The priory, completed in 1922, was designed by Arnold Constable.

The school, designed by the Beezer Brothers, completed in 1913, was a 56 by 77 feet (17 m × 23 m) two-story woodframe structure. "Because of numerous building and fire code violations, the building was condemned in 1948. Plans to demolish the existing structure and erect a new parish hall on the site will probably be executed in the near future". A replacement school was built in 1950 already?
