= Paschal Salisbury =

Dominican friars

The Reverend Paschal Salisbury O.P.
- Church: Roman Catholic Church

Orders
- Ordination: 16 June 1967 by Bishop Floyd Lawrence Begin

Personal details
- Born: Donald Hughes Salisbury; June 6, 1928 Lawrence, Kansas, United States
- Died: August 18, 2023 (aged 95) Portland, Oregon, United States
- Buried: St. Dominic Cemetery, Benicia, California, United States

Paschal Salibury, OP (born Donald Hughes Salisbury; 6 June 1928 – 18 August 2023) was an American Catholic priest who was the first African-American member of the Dominican Order.

== Biography ==
=== Early life ===
Donald Hughes Salisbury was born on 6 June 1928 to Protestant parents in Lawrence, Kansas. He grew up at a time when there were strict segregation laws and very limited employment opportunities for African Americans. His grandparents were born into slavery in Missouri and after earning freedom moved to Kansas.

=== Military service ===
In 1946, he graduated at the Liberty Memorial High School and immediately enlisted himself in the United States Army, which was segregated at the time. While serving in the military, though a Protestant, he enjoyed listening to The Catholic Hour, a popular weekly radio program hosted by Bishop Fulton Sheen, which gave him an interest in Catholicism and that influenced his whole life. After serving in the Army for his whole tenure, he joined the air force soon after President Harry S. Truman issued the executive order outlawing racial segregation in the armed forces. He was later promoted to staff sergeant while serving at Williams Air Force Base, a jet pilot training facility in Maricopa, Arizona.

During Protestant services at the base chapel, Salisbury played the organ. He was keen to get more time to practice the organ, so a friend recommended that he use the late-night hours of the base's Catholic chapel. After getting to know the chaplain, he started to play the organ during mass. With his frequent involvement with Catholic activities, he converted to the faith and was baptized in 1948. His friend, Fr. Joseph Sergott, a fellow Dominican, explained the influences that made Salisbury embrace Catholicism, saying:

"One influence was Father Fulton Sheen, who he listened to on the radio. But his experience playing the organ for Mass went deep within. He became Catholic. He was proud of his Catholic faith and eager to live it."

=== Religious life ===
After leaving the Air Force, Salisbury moved to California. He studied business at the University of San Francisco and graduated in 1957, becoming second in his class. Salisbury had a good education, but had trouble finding employment. While pursuing his profession, he attended masses regularly and joined the choir at St. Dominic's Catholic Church, where he began discerning priesthood. He made several attempts to join religious communities, but due to discrimination, he was either told to become a lay brother or denied entry.

Salisbury was finally accepted to the Dominican Order of the Western Province in 1961, taking the name of "Paschal". After six years of religious formation, he was ordained a priest on 16 June 1967 by Bishop Floyd Lawrence Begin, becoming the first African-American priest of the Dominican Order in the United States.

He was first assigned at St. Dominic's Catholic Church where he was well-received, and afterwards, after completing a clinical pastoral education, worked as a hospital chaplain and hearing confessions in different hospitals in the states of Washington, D.C., New York, Minnesota, Oregon and California.

In 2008, Salisbury retired from his hospital chaplaincy and moved to the Holy Rosary Priory in Portland, Oregon. He devoted his last years gardening, celebrating masses and hearing confessions until the point where he found it difficult to climb stairs and a fall left him bedridden and in a wheelchair.

=== Death ===
On late July 2023, Salisbury became very ill and was sent to the hospital on August 9, being entered to hospice care for the final weeks of his life. He died on 18 August 2023, at the age of 95.
