= O'Kane Building =

- O’Kane Building
- U.S. National Register of Historic Places
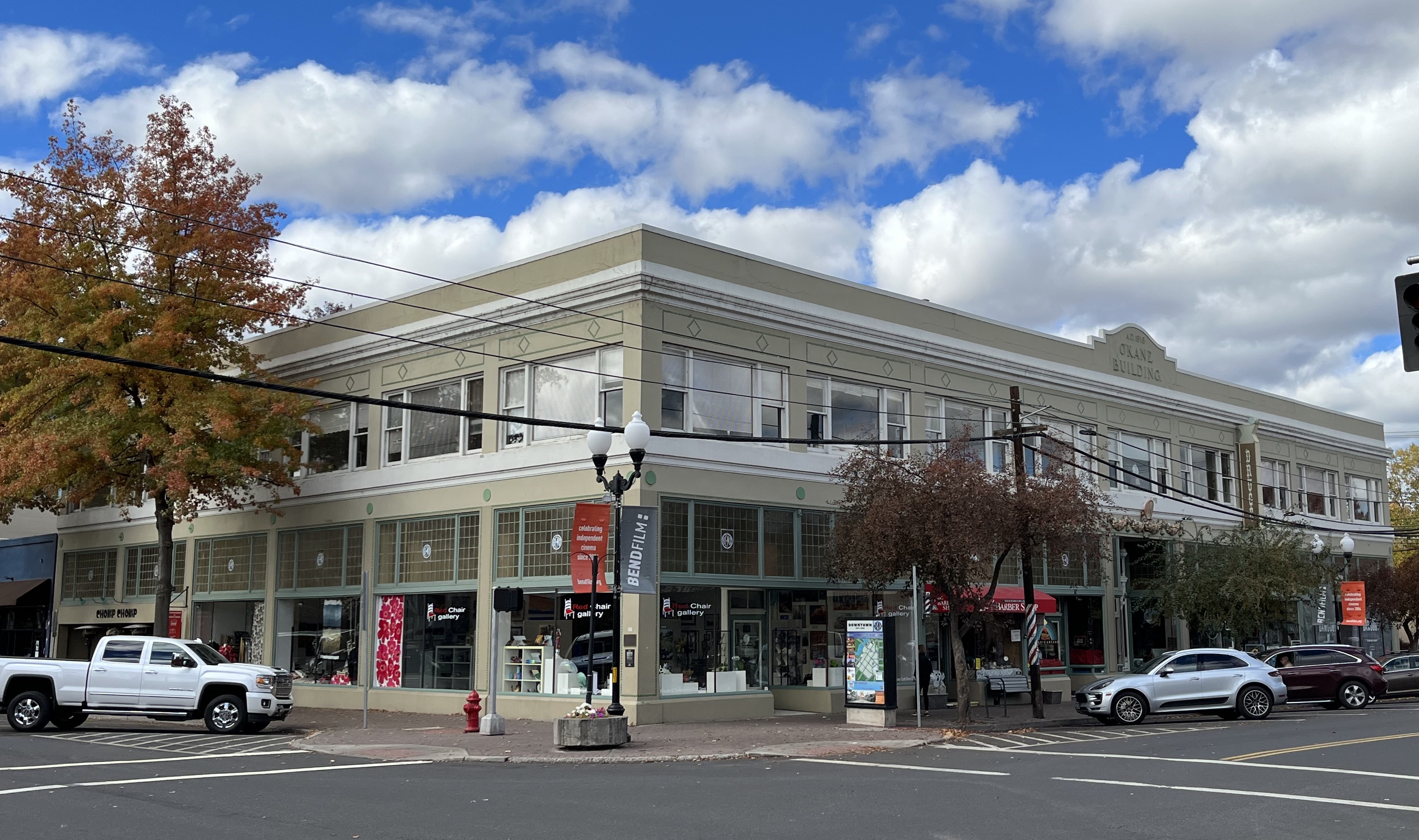
- The building from the intersection of Bond St. and Oregon Ave. in 2023

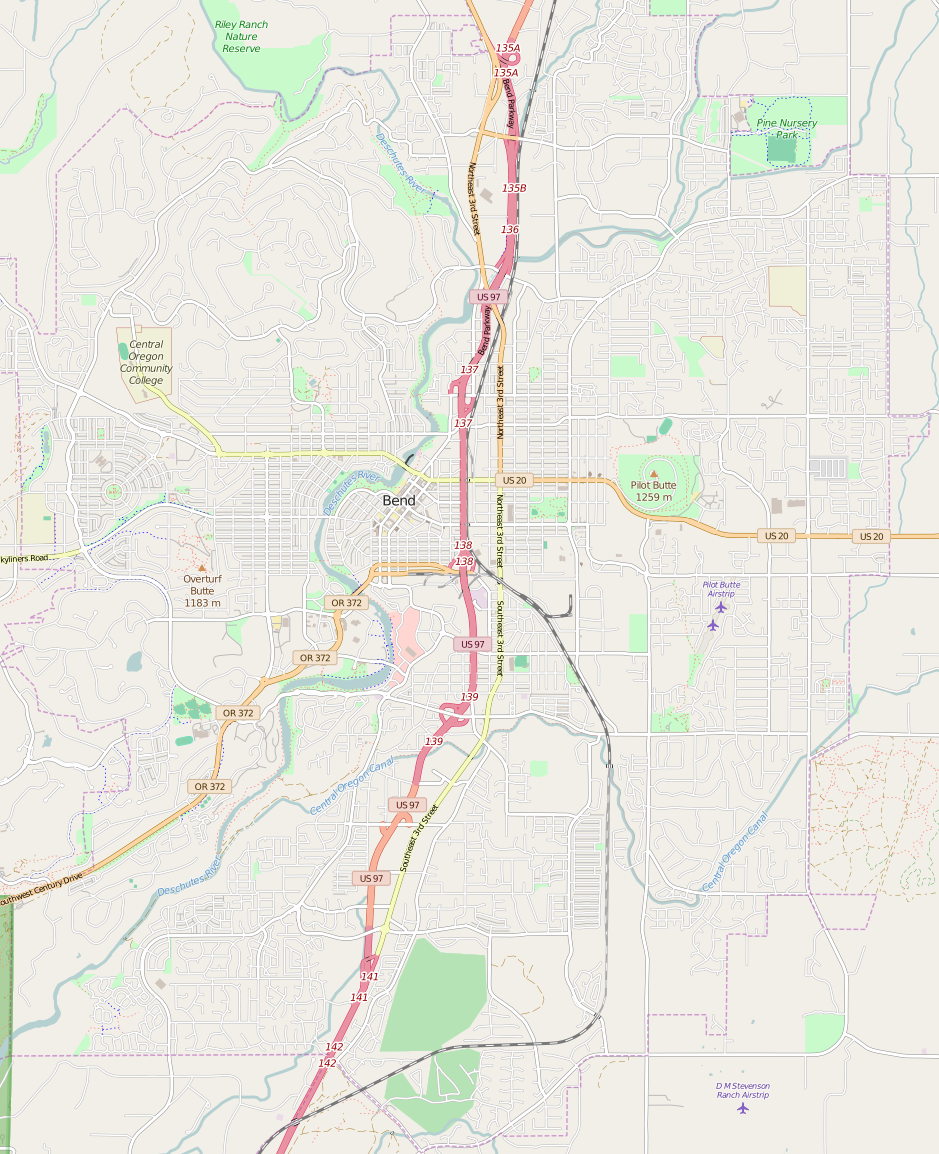
- Location within Bend OR Location within Oregon
- Location: Bend, Oregon, U.S.
- Coordinates: 44°3′32″N 121°18′46″W
- Built: 1916
- Architect: Beezer Brothers
- Architectural style: Mercantile Style
- NRHP reference No.: 86002965
- Added to NRHP: November 6, 1986

The O'Kane Building is a historic commercial building in Bend, Oregon, United States. The structure was built in 1916 by Hugh O'Kane, a local businessman. The two-story building is located downtown on the west corner of Oregon Avenue and Bond Street.

The building originally housed six retail stores and a theater on the first floor with 20 offices and an apartment upstairs. Continuously used as a commercial building since its opening, it remains downtown Bend's largest commercial structure. In 1985, it was listed on the National Register of Historic Places.

== History ==
=== Namesake ===
The building's namesake and builder, Hugh O'Kane, was born in County Antrim, Ireland, in 1857. As a young boy, he stowed away on a ship bound for New York City. By the age of 12, he was selling newspapers and shining shoes on that city's streets. He later learned the tailoring trade, but was always looking for adventure. Before he settled in Bend, Oregon, O'Kane worked as tailor, sailor, miner, stage coach driver, dispatch rider, horse trainer, and mule packer.

In the 1870s, O'Kane packed supplies in North Dakota and Montana for the U.S. Army during its campaign against the Sioux Indians. At the time of the Battle of the Little Bighorn, O'Kane was supporting General Alfred Terry's column, to which Lieutenant Colonel George Armstrong Custer and the 7th Cavalry were also attached. Later, O'Kane mined gold in the Black Hills, making a $50,000 fortune, only to lose it all gambling. From there, he moved west, packing provisions for pioneers and miners in Montana and Colorado.

In 1881, O'Kane became a manager for Tom Cannon, the world champion Greco-Roman wrestler. O'Kane led Cannon's wrestling troop on a 14-month tour of Europe. He later managed Ed Skinner and Marley Kettleman, both world champion sprinters, taking them on a tour of Australia. When he returned to the U.S., O'Kane married Helen A. Wright of Helena, Montana. In 1895, O'Kane opened a large hotel in Grangeville, Idaho. Leaving his wife to manage the hotel, O'Kane traveled around the U.S. racing horses, which he turned into a very successful business.

In 1903, O'Kane and his wife moved to Bend, where they built the Bend Hotel, which quickly became a Central Oregon landmark. It was a very popular meeting place for local businessmen and civic leaders as well as a welcome stop for travelers, but on 30 August 1915, it was destroyed in a fire. Undeterred by the loss, O'Kane decided to build a commercial building on his newly vacant downtown property. He hired the well-known Beezer Brothers architectural firm to design a fireproof building with space for retail stores and offices. It was finished in 1916, by which time O'Kane weighed about 300 pounds; he spent most afternoons lounging in a chair propped against the building. From there, he told colorful stories to visitors or slept. Late in his life O'Kane moved to Portland, Oregon, where he died on 16 February 1930 at the age of 73.

=== Building ===
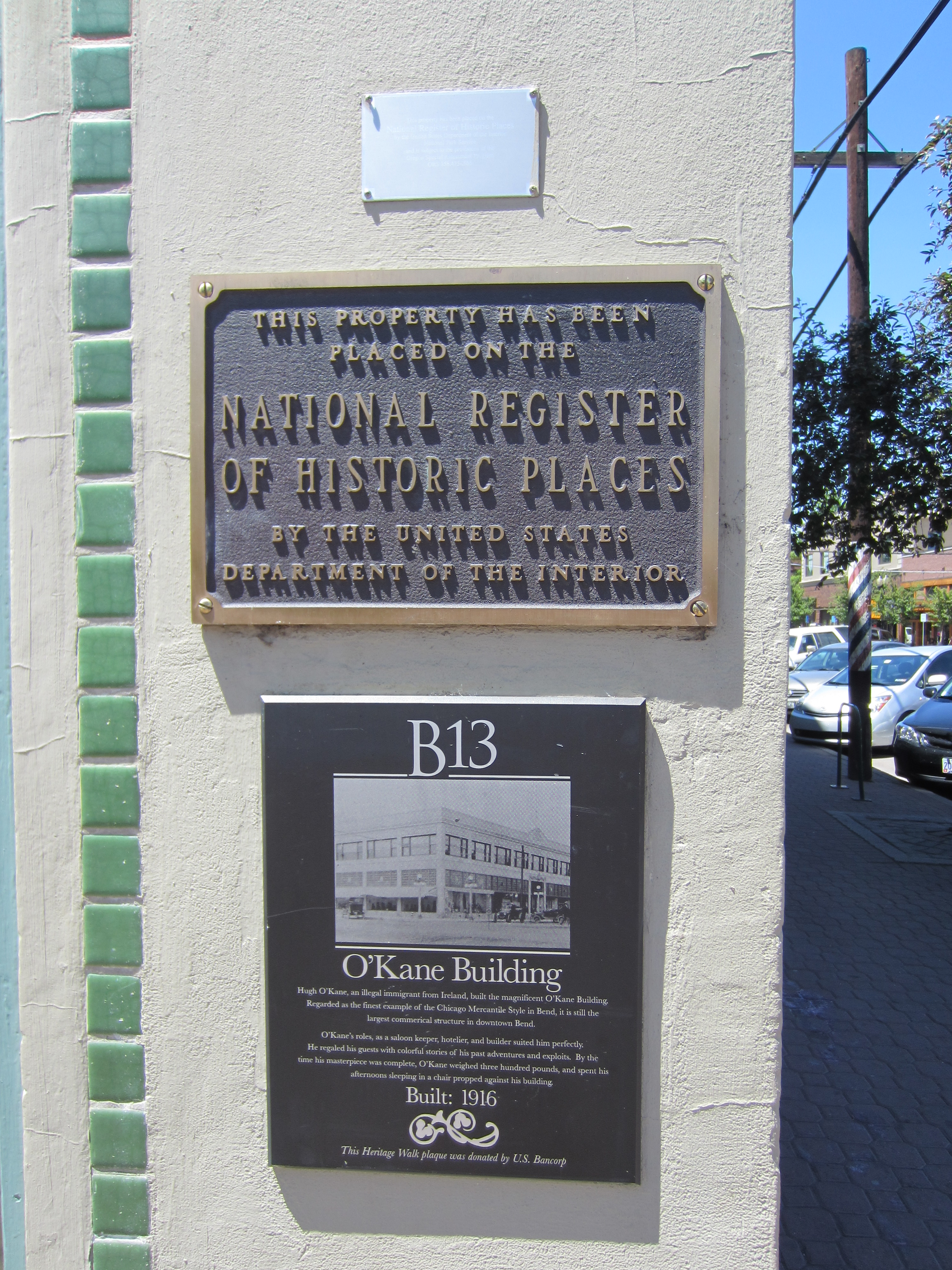
Plaque commemorating the building's addition to the National Register of Historic Places

The O'Kane Building was designed by Louis Beezer and Michael J. Beezer of Beezer Brothers, a Seattle-based architectural firm. The building was constructed in 1916 by Fred Frodeson, a general contractor from the Bend area. The building originally housed six retail stores, 20 offices, and a theater. There was also a second-floor apartment used by O'Kane and his wife. When it was built, the building was the largest commercial structure in Bend. When Deschutes County separated from Crook County, Bend was selected as the county seat, but there was no courthouse, so the county government rented two offices in the newly opened O'Kane Building to serve as the county court, its first location.

The building is an excellent example of Bend's early 20th-century development. It was the first building in Bend to be built using reinforced concrete as the primary building material. Because of its importance to Bend history and architecture, the building was listed on the National Register of Historic Places on 6 November 1986. The building has been in continuous use as a commercial building since it first opened in 1916. Today, it is still the largest commercial structure in downtown Bend.

== Structure ==
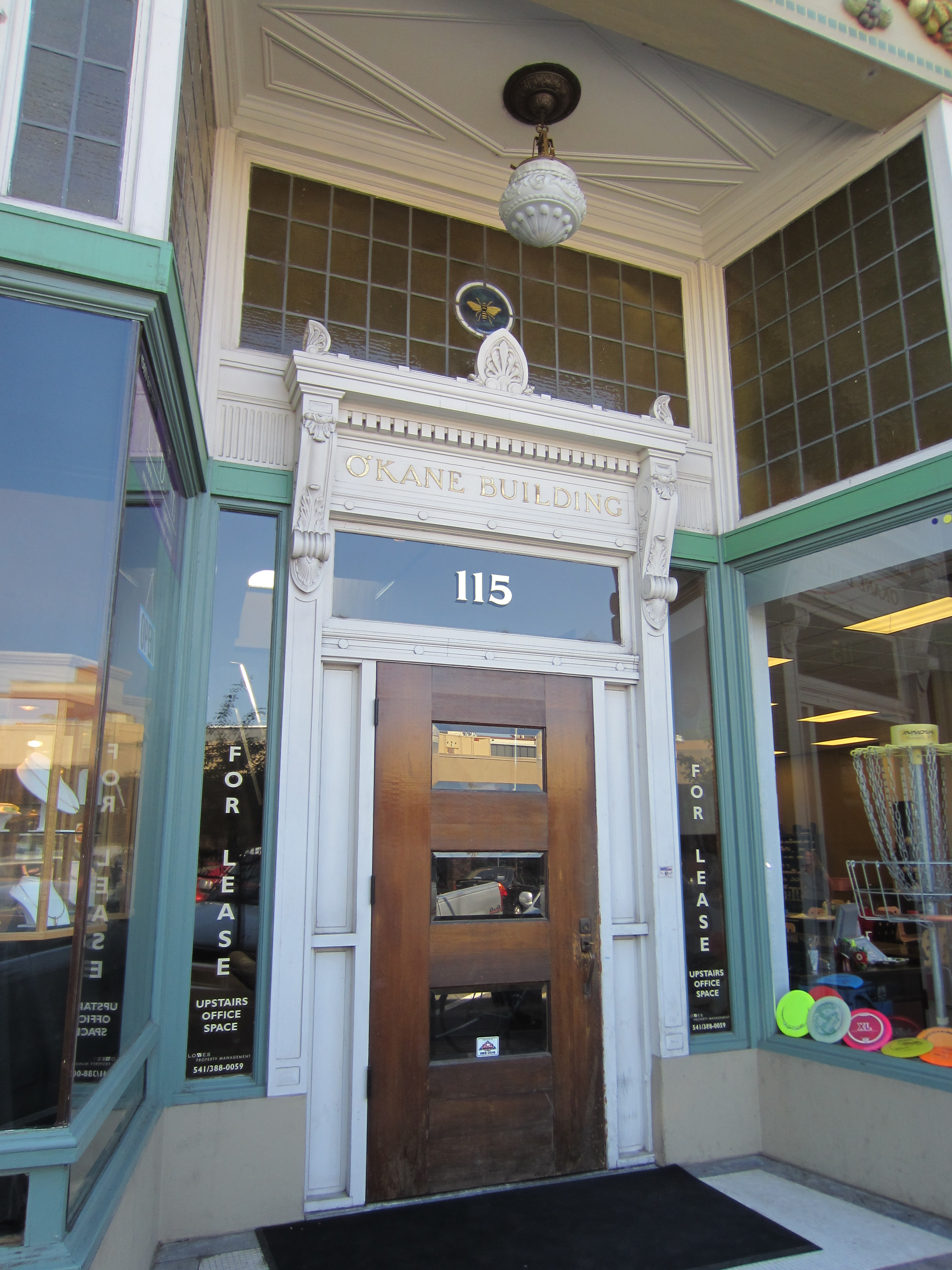
The main entrance and "Bend Bee"

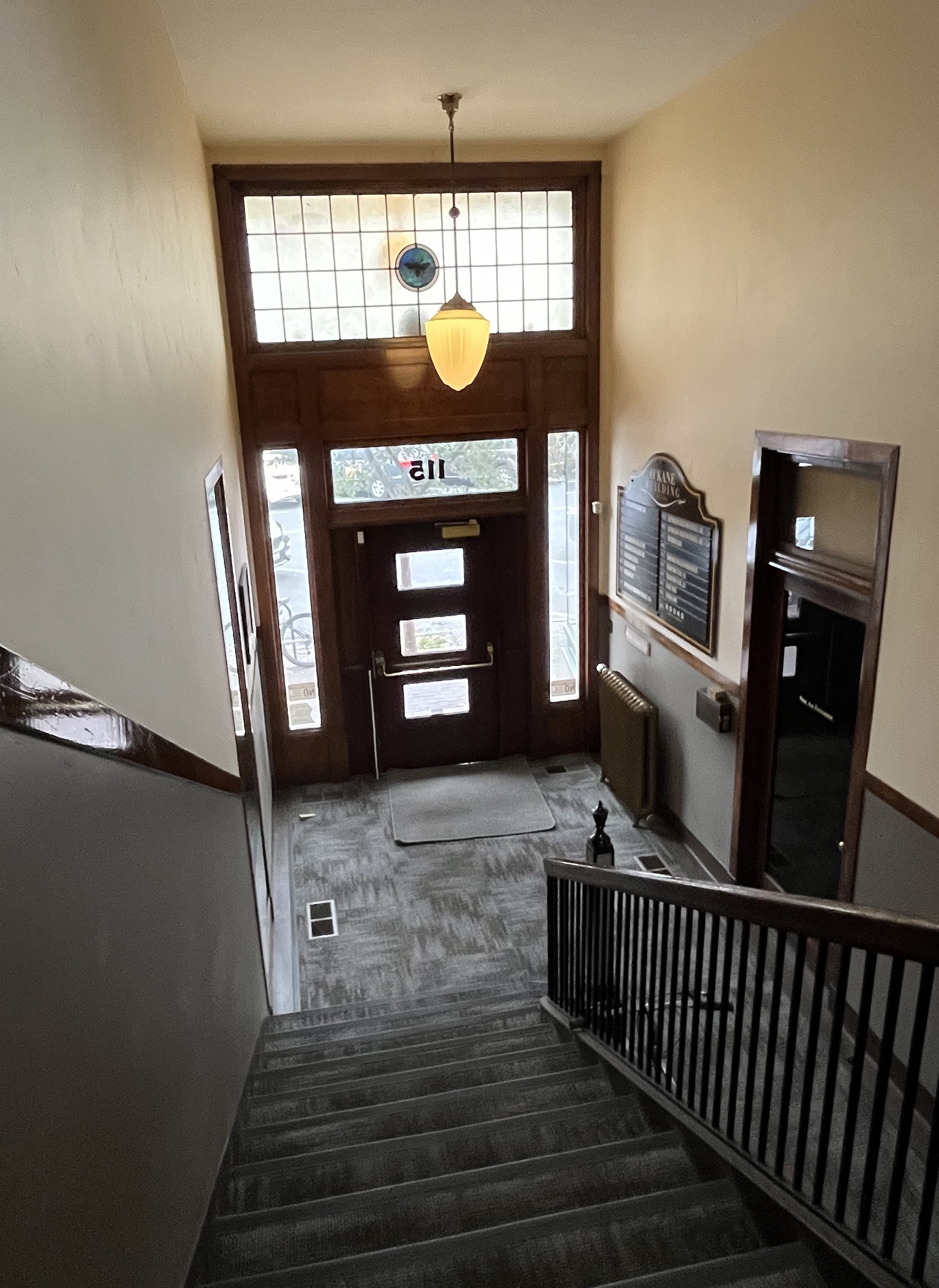
The lobby and the other half bee

The O'Kane Building is located on the west corner of Oregon Avenue and Bond Street in downtown Bend. It is a two-story mercantile-style building with a footprint of approximately 100 by 140 feet (30 by 43 meters). The foundation is concrete and brick with stone firewalls dividing up the basement space. The building was constructed using reinforced concrete as the primary building material. The building has approximately 26,000 square feet (2,400 m^{2}) of usable commercial space.

The building's two main façades face Oregon Avenue and Bond Street. The façade was built with reinforced concrete. It is painted a potter's clay beige color with white trim. It has a flat roof with large display windows along its street frontage. Above the display windows are sets of pebbled transom windows with green borders; in the center of each set are opening insets decorated by stained-glass emblems of the name "Bend". The offices on the second floor have large triple-window sets; (Note: Each set has a central picture window between pairs of one-over-one double-hung windows.) Above these are rectangular green tile insets with open diamond designs at both ends.

The building's main entrance leads to the second-floor offices. The entrance is the building's most decorative architectural feature. The wooden doorframes are hand carved. There is a stained-glass transom above the entrance with a "Bend Bee" design in the middle, The Bend Bee design is set in blue with a white border. Above the entrance on the outside, there is a plaster cornucopia garland of flowers, fruits, and wheat stocks.

The original theater was later converted into a billiards parlor and café. To accommodate the new tenants, the theater section of the building was significantly altered. There are no known photographs of the original theater, so when that section of the building was remodeled in 1985, it was designed to match the rest of the O'Kane building. As of 1986, the old theater housed an exercise studio.

=== Interior ===
Inside the main entrance, there is a high ceiling and simple plaster walls. A flight of steps with a midway landing leads to the second-floor hallway. The second floor is an L-shaped corridor lined with offices along the Oregon Avenue and Bond Street sides of the building. Today, there are 19 offices along the corridor (one less than the original number). At the far end of the corridor overlooking Bond Street is an apartment suite originally built for the owner and his wife. The corridor has plaster walls with dark wood trim. The plaster is textured below the wainscot molding and smooth above it. The office entrances have dark wooden doors with large pebbled-glass-style inset windows. Most of the original brass and nickel hardware is still in place throughout the building. The interiors of the first-floor retail shops are simple open rectangular spaces as they were originally designed.

== Gallery ==
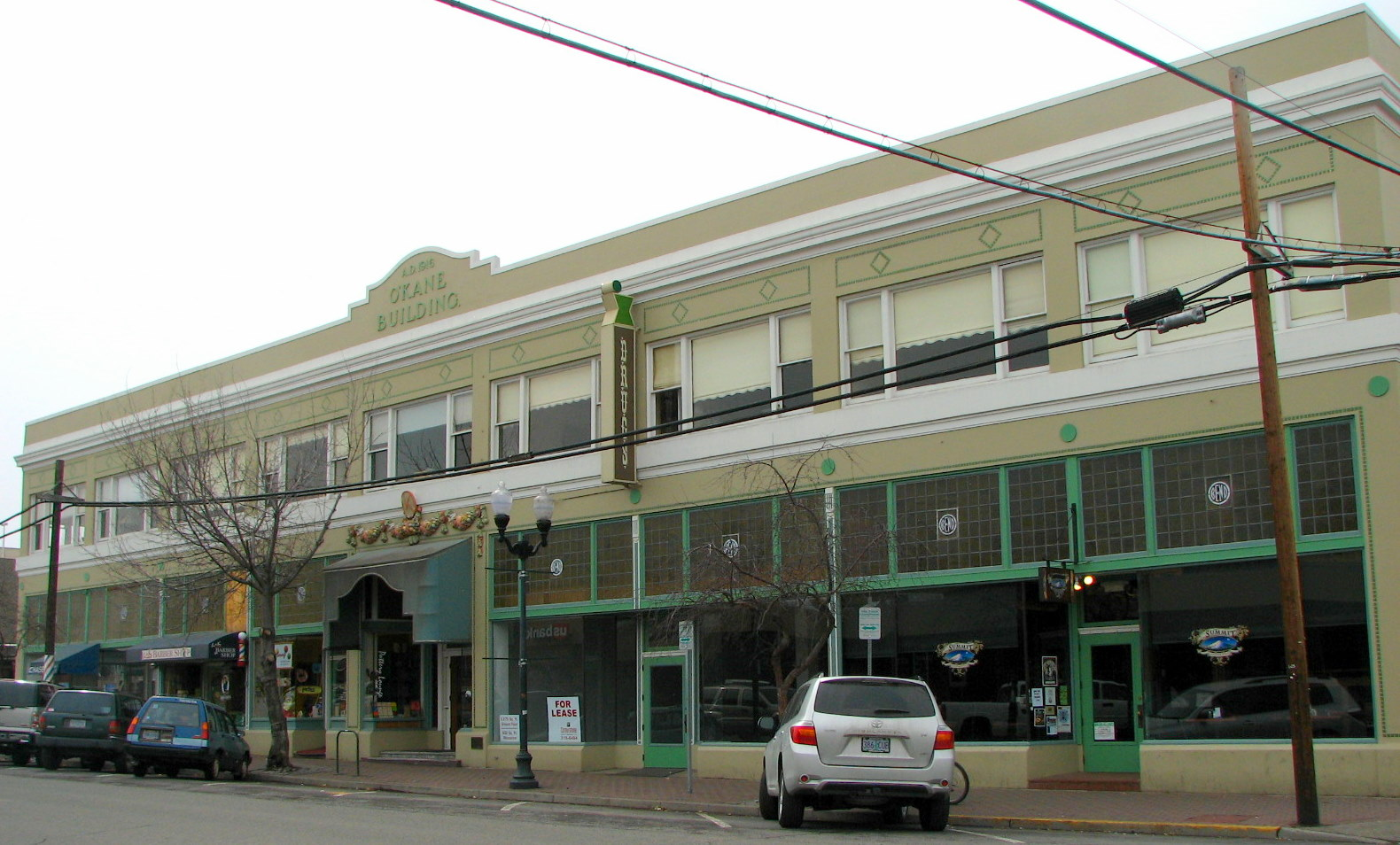
Building frontage in 2009

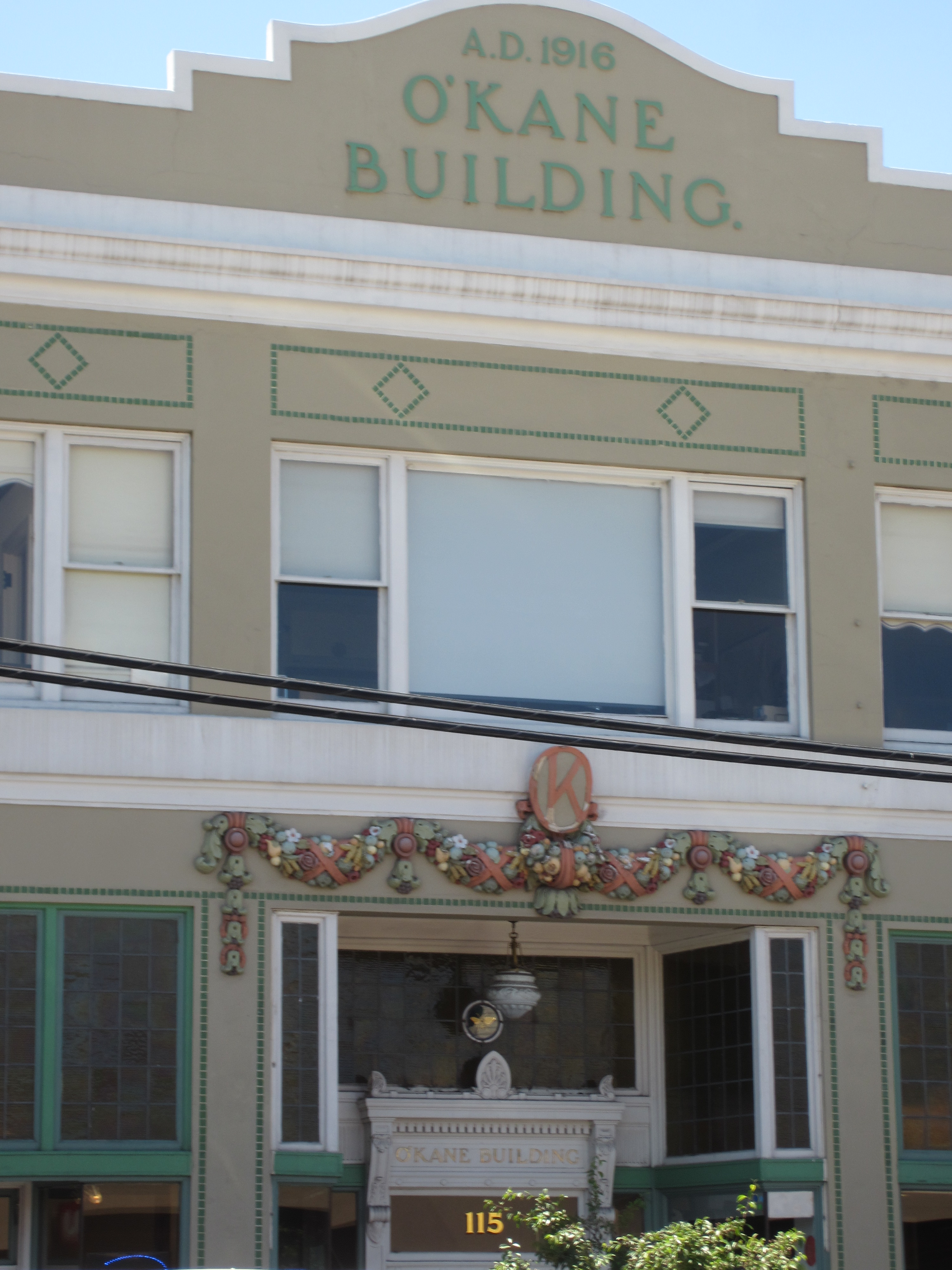
The upper façade

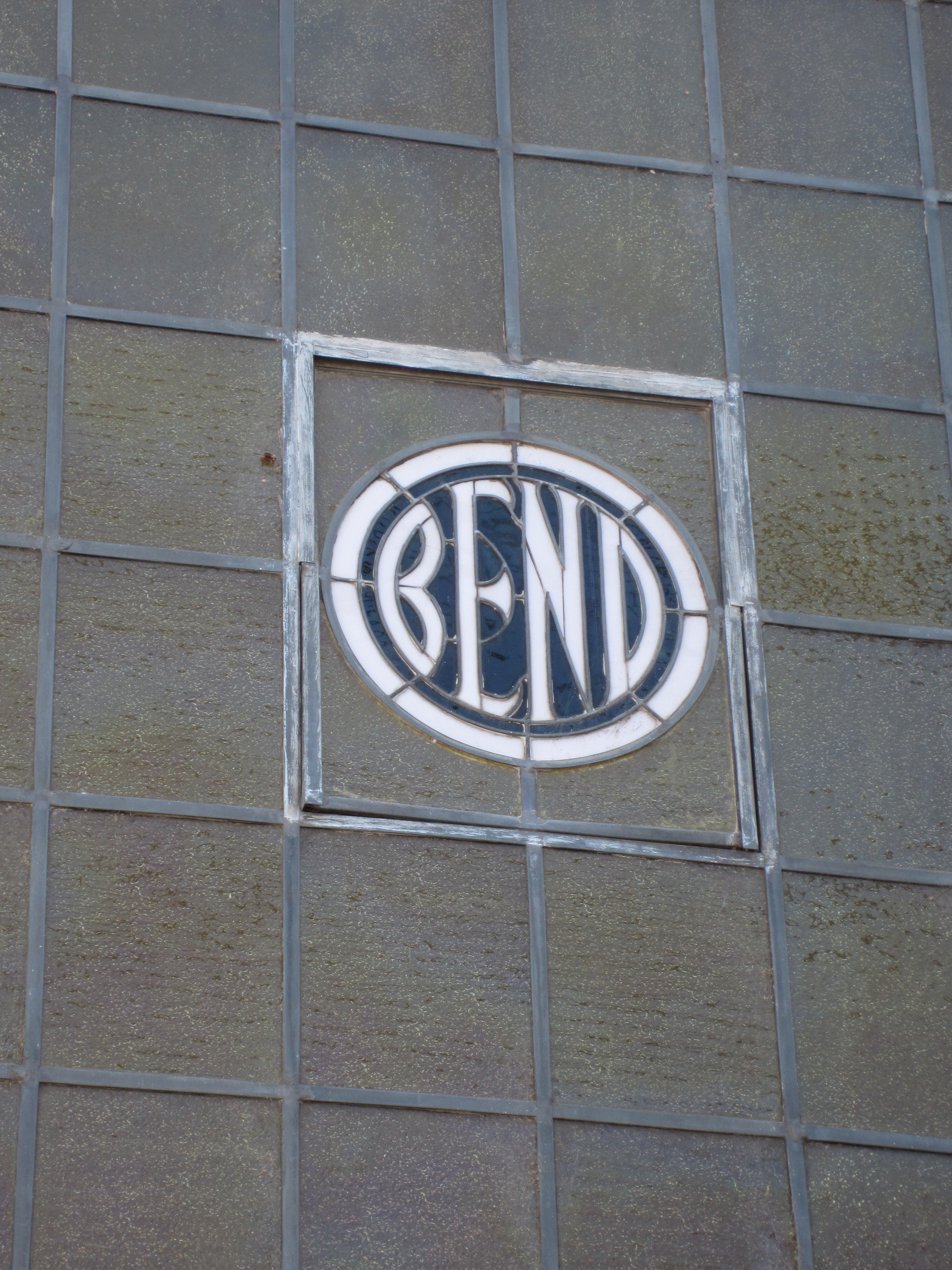
Stained-glass emblem
