= St. Dominic's Catholic Church (San Francisco) =

Catholic Church in San Francisco, United States

Coordinates: 37°47′12″N 122°26′11″W

St. Dominic's Catholic Church is a historic parish in the Lower Pacific Heights neighborhood of San Francisco, California, located at the corner of Bush and Steiner Streets. The parish was established by the Dominican Order in 1873, and the current church, built in the Gothic style by the Beezer Brothers, was finished in 1928.

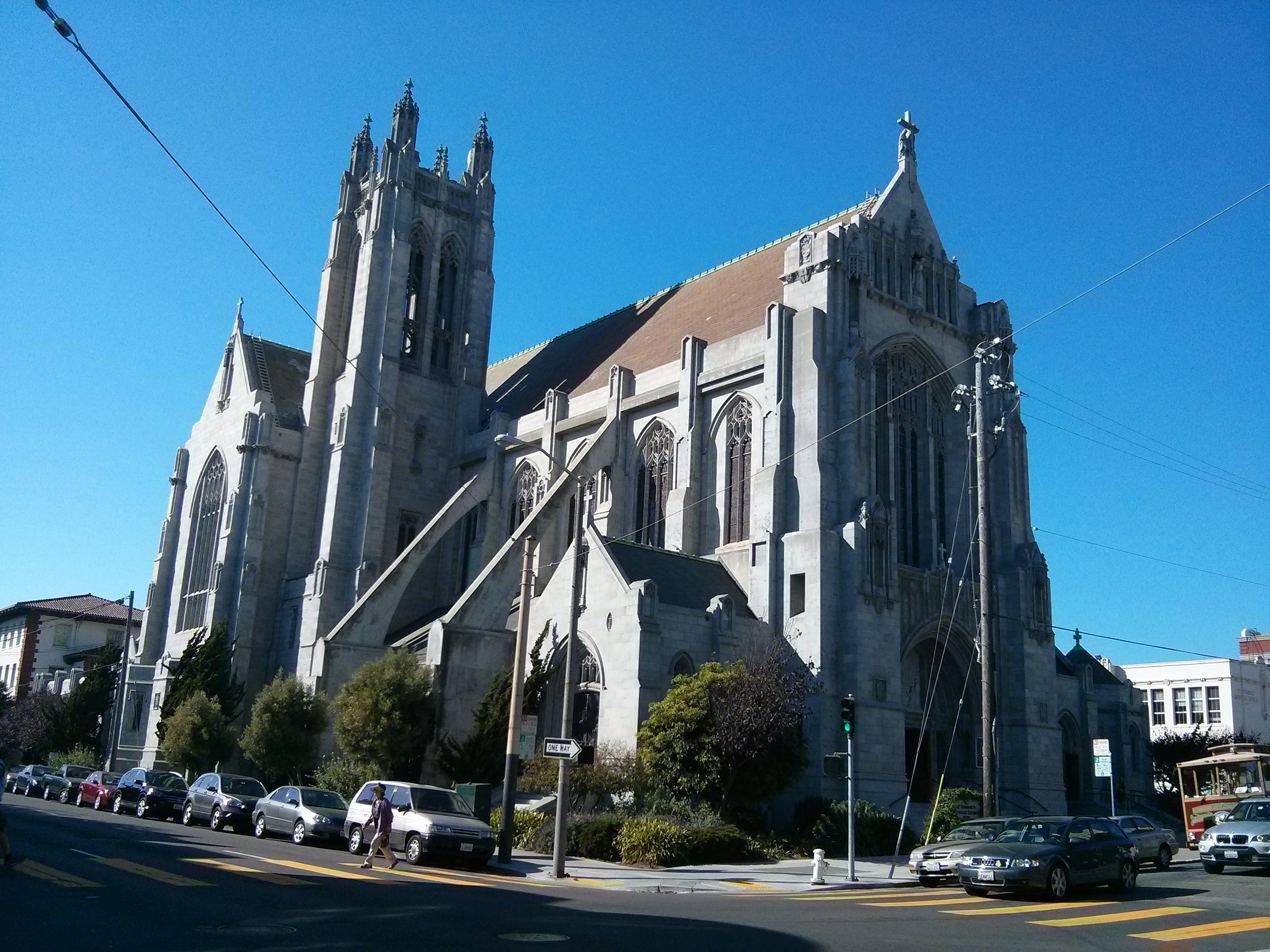
Exterior view of the church

In addition to a large parish membership, St. Dominic's Church has one of the most active young adults groups in the Archdiocese of San Francisco. The Church gave its name to Van Morrison's hit 1972 studio album, Saint Dominic's Preview.

== Parish history ==
Dominicans first came to San Francisco in 1850 when Bishop Joseph Sadoc Alemany and Fr Sadoc Francis Vilarrasa and Mary Goemere arrived from Spain via several other appointments in the United States. Bishop Alemany, who in 1840 completed his studies in sacred theology in Rome at the College of St. Thomas (the future Pontifical University of Saint Thomas Aquinas), had been appointed Bishop of Monterey and invited Vilarrasa to accompany him to California. The Archdiocese of San Francisco was created in 1853 and Archbishop Alemany was its first incumbent.

The first Dominican priory in San Francisco was established in 1863 at Van Ness and Broadway to provide a center for the friars who were given charge of the new parish of Saint Brigid. The Dominicans served there until 1875 when it was transferred to diocesan clergy. During this time, Dominicans served the parishes of St. Francis of Assisi and Notre Dame des Victoires as well.

In 1863, the Dominican Order paid $6,000 for the city block bounded by Steiner, Bush, Pierce and Pine Streets. During 1872 and 1873, Fr. Vilarrasa and the Provincial Council approved the expenditure of $25,000 to build a priory and a church. The first Saint Dominic's, a small church at the corner of Bush and Steiner Streets, was blessed on June 29, 1873. The Priory of Saint Dominic was formally established in 1876.

By 1880, it was apparent that the church was too small for its rapidly growing congregation. Plans were drawn for a much larger church to be built of brick on the same site. The first church was moved to a location on Pine Street where it served as a parish hall. Although the cornerstone of the second church was laid in 1883, years of financial hardship followed and the church did not open until 1887 and was not completed for several years after. It served the parish until 1906 San Francisco earthquake struck on April 18, 1906. Heavily damaged by the earthquake, the dome of the north tower remained precariously perched on its framework, high above the street.

During the months following the earthquake, parishioners gathered for Mass outdoors until, in October 1906, a wooden church opened on the Pierce Street side of the block. This "temporary" Saint Dominic's was to remain in use as a church until 1928 and as a parish hall until the 1960s.

Work did not begin on the fourth Saint Dominic's until 1923. After construction was finished in 1928, the new church, designed by Beezer Brothers chief designer Arnold Constable, was blessed by Archbishop Hanna. Even then, work continued for many years as the building we know now was brought to completion at the time of Saint Dominic's centennial celebration in 1973.

The current, gothic-style church shows both English & French influences in its design and construction, leaning more towards the English. One of the most notable extant French influences is the semi-circular apse at the western end of the church.

The Loma Prieta earthquake of 1989 destroyed another of the primary French features: the beautiful octagonal "lantern" of Saint Dominic's tower. The tower itself was severely damaged, but was repaired and strengthened during the two months the church was closed. Much of the decorative work on the ceiling beams of the church fell during the quake and the remainder was removed for the safety of the parishioners.

As early as 1984, engineering tests had determined that the church was seismically unstable. Work began immediately to find a solution and a way to pay for it. The Saint Dominic's Preservation and Restoration Project began its work in 1986. By June 1991, sufficient funds had been raised to begin the construction of nine flying buttresses that rise from concrete piers deep underground and soar to connect at a ring beam that girdles the church at the roof line. This medieval concept was found to be the best solution to a late 20th-century problem. But the cost was in 1992 dollars: $6.6 million. Parishioners and friends from around the world confirmed the importance of this Church by raising all the needed funds.

Construction was completed in July 1992, and Archbishop John R. Quinn of San Francisco dedicated the new Saint Dominic's Church on August 1, 1992.

== See also ==
- Dominican Order in the United States

== Sources ==
- First Archbishop of San Francisco
- Missions Of Spanish Era had Wide Influence
