= Central Pennsylvania Festival of the Arts =

Annual event at Pennsylvania State University

Coordinates: 40.79441°N 77.86157°W

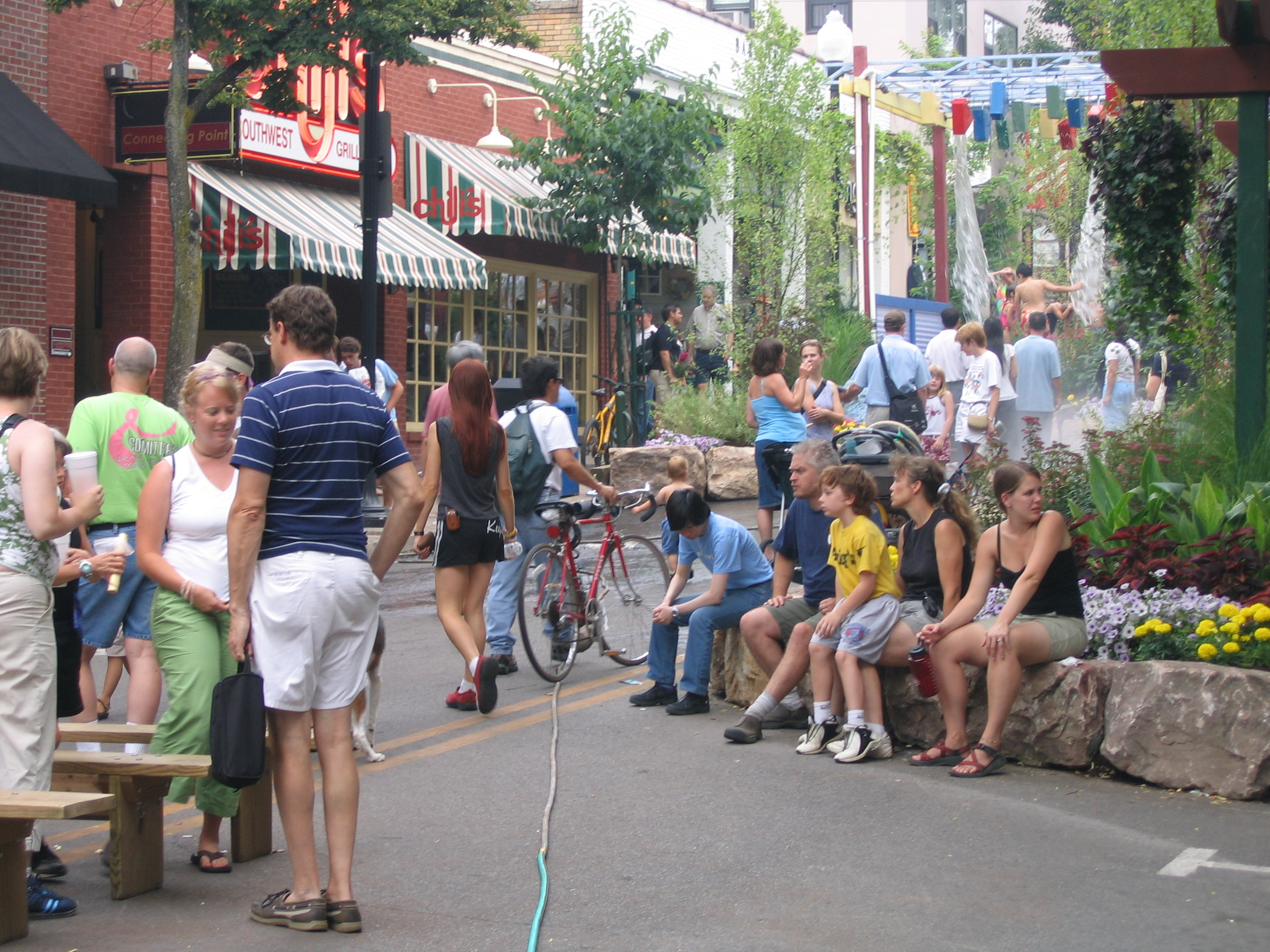
- Downtown State College during the Arts Fest
- Frequency: annually
- Location: State College, Pennsylvania
- Years active: 59
- Inaugurated: 1967
- Website: Central Pennsylvania Festival of the Arts

The Central Pennsylvania Festival of the Arts, officially abbreviated as CPFA, is held each summer in State College, Pennsylvania and on the main (University Park) campus of Pennsylvania State University. Penn State students and locals commonly refer to the event as Arts Fest.

== History ==
The first Central Pennsylvania Festival of the Arts was held in July 1967, and lasted nine days. Sponsored by Penn State's College of Arts and Architecture and the State College Chamber of Commerce, the first Festival was opened by Governor Raymond P. Shafer. Musical performances took place downtown and on campus, and the first Sidewalk Sale and Exhibition consisted of people hanging work on snow fence along "The Wall" on the southern border of the Old Main lawn. The show wasn't originally juried, so one could purchase art created by professionals and amateurs. Patrons could even buy kittens.

The festival is now five days long, from Wednesday through Sunday in early July each year, and the Sidewalk Sale and Exhibition is now professionally juried. A large portion of the event takes place in the Borough of State College, PA, and the remainder on the adjacent University Park campus of The Pennsylvania State University.

The Central Pennsylvania Festival of the Arts placed at number five on the list of Top 10 Summer Festivals 2013 by Livability.com, a national website that ranks quality of life and travel amenities of America's small and mid-sized cities.

Due to the COVID-19 pandemic, the event was forced to go virtual in 2020 and 2021.

== Governance and Mission ==
The festival is governed by a Board of Directors, half of whom must have an affiliation with Penn State ("gown"), while the other half represents the "town" interests. The Board employs a staff of three to manage both the Central Pennsylvania Festival of the Arts and First Night State College. The board established the mission of the festival which is to “celebrate the arts with presentations of diverse, high-quality visual and performing arts through the cooperative volunteer support of the community and The Pennsylvania State University. The essence of this organization is the enrichment and education of the audience, grounded in personal interaction between artist and audience." Approximately 400 volunteers help bring the Festival to life each summer.

== Children and Youth Day ==
The first day of the Festival is always Children and Youth Day. It features the Children and Youth Sidewalk Sale, free children's art and craft workshops, and performances by and for young people on two outdoor and one indoor stage.

== Sidewalk Sale and Exhibition ==
The Sidewalk Sale and Exhibition brings artists and craftspeople from across the nation to State College. More than three hundred exhibitors offer objects for sale, including baskets, ceramics, jewelry, fiber, paintings, photography, and wearable art.

As part of the Sidewalk Sale and Exhibition's jury process, artists from the United States and several foreign countries submit digital images of their work to be juried. Each February, a panel reviews the images and the artists receiving the highest scores were accepted into the Sidewalk Sale & Exhibition.

To encourage and support the visual arts on a regional basis, the Sidewalk Sale and Exhibition sets aside booth spaces for artists whose primary residence is in the following Central Pennsylvania counties: Blair, Centre, Clearfield, Clinton, Huntingdon, Mifflin and Union. Though the Central Pennsylvania Division of the Sidewalk Sale, many artists have been introduced to exhibiting at juried outdoor shows. All exhibitors in the Sidewalk Sale and Exhibition are subject to the same rules, pay the same fees, and are eligible for the same awards. Sidewalk Sale and Exhibition exhibitors are eligible to receive over $17,000 in prize money.

The Sidewalk Sale and Exhibition of the Central Pennsylvania Festival of the Arts recently ranked second on the list of 100 Best Fine Art and Design Shows in America, up from a ranking of third, which it held for the last two years. The twentieth annual poll, published in the September 2012 issue of Sunshine Artist, is based on sales totals reported by exhibitors at the 2011 festival. Sunshine Artist magazine is America's premier show and festival guide.

== Performing arts ==
In addition to the Sidewalk Sale and Exhibition, the Festival presents performers on outdoor and indoor stages in downtown State College and on the Penn State campus. Currently the Festival presents indoors in St. Andrew's Episcopal Church, State College Presbyterian Church, and the State Theatre in downtown State College. The Festival also erects outdoor stages on the 100 block of South Allen Street, and on the lawn of Old Main, Penn State's administration building. Each July, about fifty different performers are presented. Most performances are free, some require a Festival button for admission. Music presented covers a wide range of genres, from classical to rock to bluegrass to jazz to symphonic band. Performers are of international, national, state, and regional standing.

== Images Exhibition ==
Images is the Festival's juried gallery exhibition in the Robeson Gallery on the University Park campus of Penn State and hangs from June through July each year. It is open to artists living in Pennsylvania, Ohio, New York, New Jersey, Delaware, Maryland, West Virginia, Virginia and the District of Columbia. Work entered in exhibition is to be no more than three years old.

The exhibition accepts works in ceramic, fiber, and paper, in addition to the traditional fine art categories of drawings, painting, mixed media, photography, printmaking, watercolor, and sculpture. Artists must have their primary residence in Pennsylvania, one of the adjacent states, Virginia or the District of Columbia. While exhibition is regional in scope, the region in question is very large and has a high population.

Through the years the exhibition has been juried by curators and directors from the Cleveland Museum of Art, the Carnegie Museum of Art, the Albright-Knox Gallery, and major university galleries, including Penn State's own, Palmer Museum of Art.

== Posters ==
Arts festivals across the country often advertise themselves with collectible posters. For the past 30 years this Festival's posters have been designed Penn State Professor of Visual Arts Lanny Sommese, and many are locally iconic images in the community.

== The Sue Crowe Memorial Annual Arts Festival Races ==
The Arts Festival 10K is the oldest race in Central Pennsylvania. First run in 1975 as a 10 Miler, the Arts Festival race became a 10K race in the late 1980s. The course has gone through numerous changes over the years. In 2005, a 5K race was added and a new course created that combines East and West Campuses. Proceeds benefit youth running activities in Centre County and the continuing operations of the Nittany Valley Running Club.

In 2006, the Arts Festival races were renamed in honor of Sue Crowe, who died in February 2006. Crowe was a Central Pennsylvania running community fixture who also coached upcoming competitors. She and her family competed in most of the Arts Festival races, and she was a five-time winner: three times while the race was a 10-miler and two times after it became a 10K race. The race currently honors her memory.

== Downtown State College Italian Street Painting Festival ==
Italian Street Painting, in the style of Renaissance Europe, has been a tradition in State College since 1999. This portion of the Festival is on the 100 block of Hiester Street, a few blocks away from the main Festival zone.

The Downtown State College Italian Street Painting Festival features street painters of national significance, in addition to a Young Artists Alley. At least 30 smaller works measuring 6’ by 4’ are drawn by a variety of local visual artists, State College Area High School art students and Penn State art majors.

== First Night State College ==
Festival organisers also produce First Night State College, an alcohol-free, arts centered festival on December 31. First Night features a display of outdoor ice carving, including an ice slide. First Night features performances by musicians, dancers, and theatre groups, Other activities include arts and crafts workshops for young children, carriage rides, and a 5K run.

== BookFestPA ==
BookfestPA is a portion of the Festival centered around literature and includes local authors, talks by writers, and an array of book-related activities. The event is hosted by Schlow Centre Region Library.

The anime convention Setsucon, run under the local Penn State Anime Organization, sponsors a Costume Contest during BookFestPA.
