= State College, Pennsylvania =

Borough in Pennsylvania, US

State College
- Home rule municipality
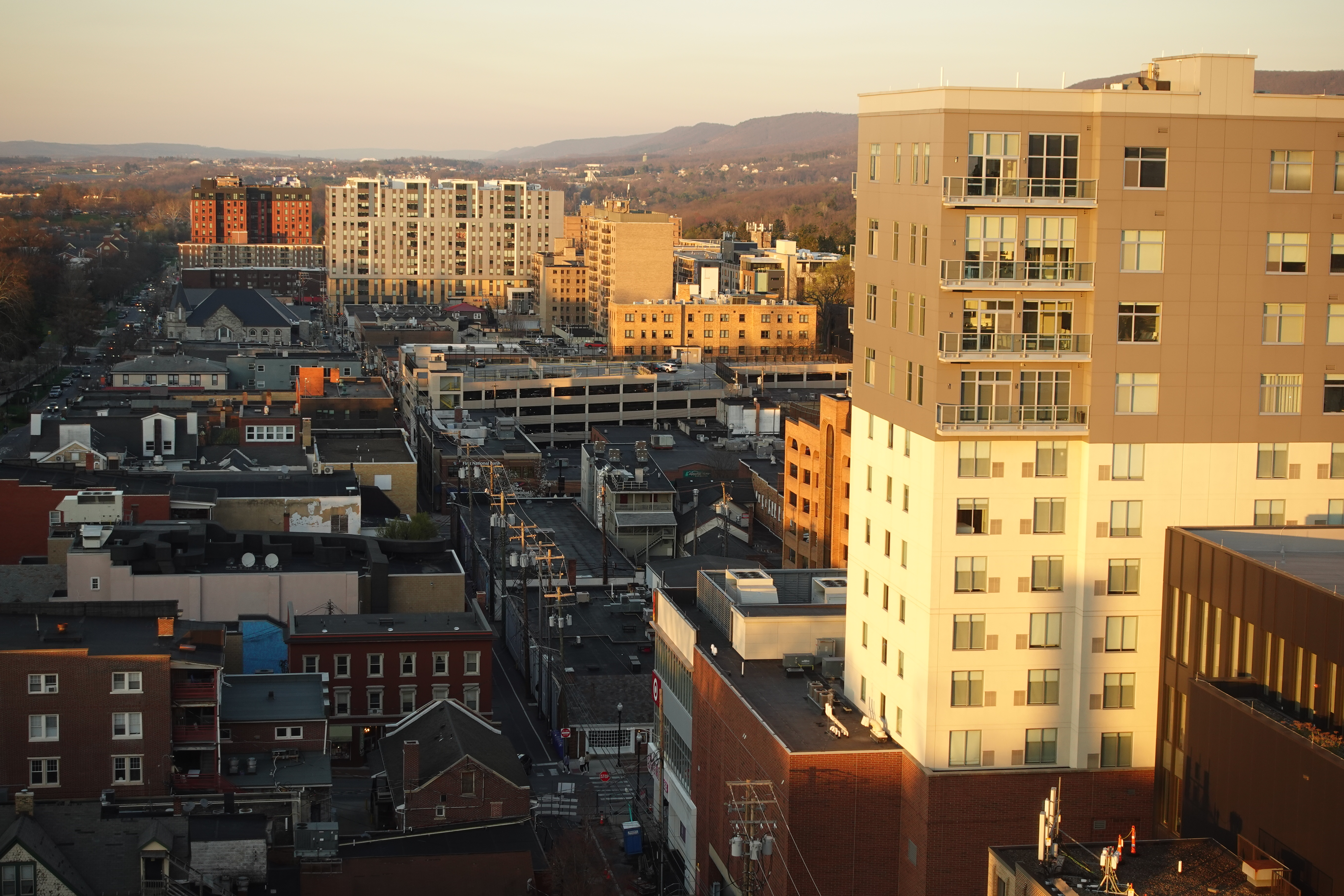
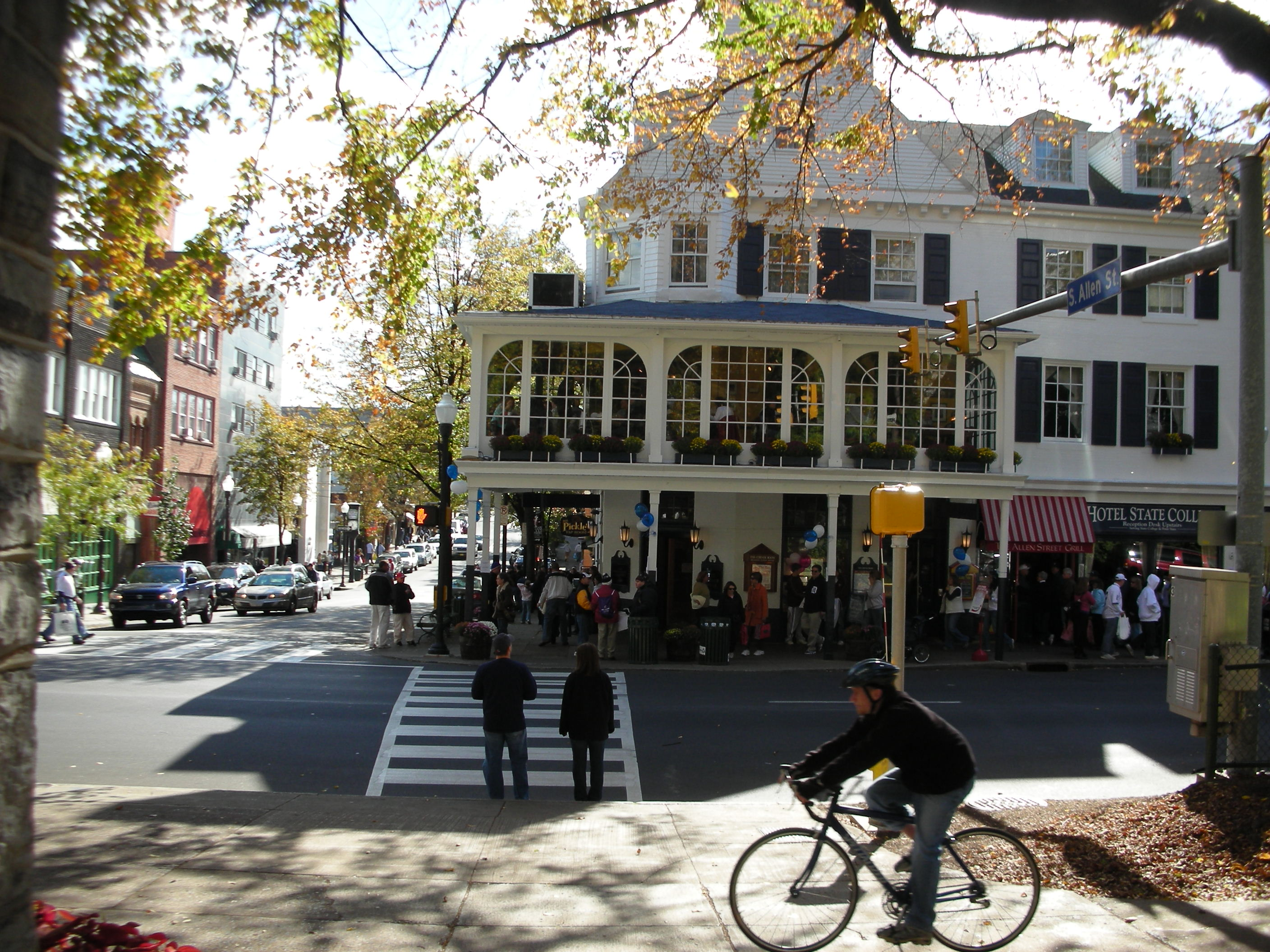
- Downtown State College Pennsylvania State University The Corner Room

- Logo
- Nicknames: "Lion Country", "Happy Valley"
- Interactive map of State College
- Location within Pennsylvania Location within the United States
- Coordinates: 40°47′37.144″N 77°51′45.563″W
- Country: United States
- State: Pennsylvania
- County: Centre
- Incorporated: August 29, 1896; 130 years ago

Government
  - Mayor: Ezra Nanes (D)
  - Borough Council President: Evan Myers

Area
  - Home rule municipality: 4.58 sq mi (11.86 km^{2})
  - Land: 4.58 sq mi (11.86 km^{2})
  - Water: 0 sq mi (0.00 km^{2})
- Elevation: 1,154 ft (352 m)

Population (2020)
  - Home rule municipality: 40,501
  - Density: 8,846/sq mi (3,415.5/km^{2})
  - Urban: 87,454 (US: 335th)
  - Metro: MSA:158,742 (US: 257th); CSA: 236,577 (US: 124th)
- Time zone: UTC−5 (EST)
  - Summer (DST): UTC−4 (EDT)
- ZIP Codes: 16801, 16802, 16803, 16804, 16805
- Area code: 814 and 582
- FIPS code: 42-73808
- School district: State College Area School District
- Website: www.statecollegepa.us

State College is a borough and the largest settlement in Centre County, Pennsylvania, United States. Home to the main campus of Pennsylvania State University, it is the largest borough in Pennsylvania, with a population of 40,501 as of the 2020 census. State College and the surrounding townships are collectively known as Happy Valley, which is part of the larger Nittany Valley. State College and the nearby city of DuBois anchor the State College–DuBois combined statistical area which includes all of Centre and Clearfield counties.

Several indigenous groups (Note: The Lenape, Haudenosaunee, Mingo, and Shawnee are a few groups known to have been present.) inhabited the State College area prior to European colonization. In 1855, ironmaster James Irvin offered 200 acres of land around the Centre Furnace for the construction of an agricultural school. Despite its isolation, the Nittany Valley was chosen to be the home of the Farmers' High School of Pennsylvania in part due to its soil fertility. State College would officially become a borough in 1896, and would continue to grow alongside the university throughout the 20th century. The area was nicknamed "Happy Valley" for its economic resilience during the Great Depression. State College was also largely unaffected by the Great Recession, leading to a construction boom in the 21st century.

Major cultural institutions include the Palmer Museum of Art, the State Theatre, Schlow Library, and the Bryce Jordan Center. State College is home to University Park, which hosts Beaver Stadium, the second-largest stadium in the Western Hemisphere. The State College Spikes play for the MLB Draft League at Medlar Field. Public transport in the borough is operated by the Centre Area Transportation Authority. The State College Regional Airport connects the area to larger international airline hubs.

Governed by a home rule charter, State College largely votes for the Democratic Party, with Ezra Nanes serving as mayor since 2021.

== History ==
=== Farmers' High School ===
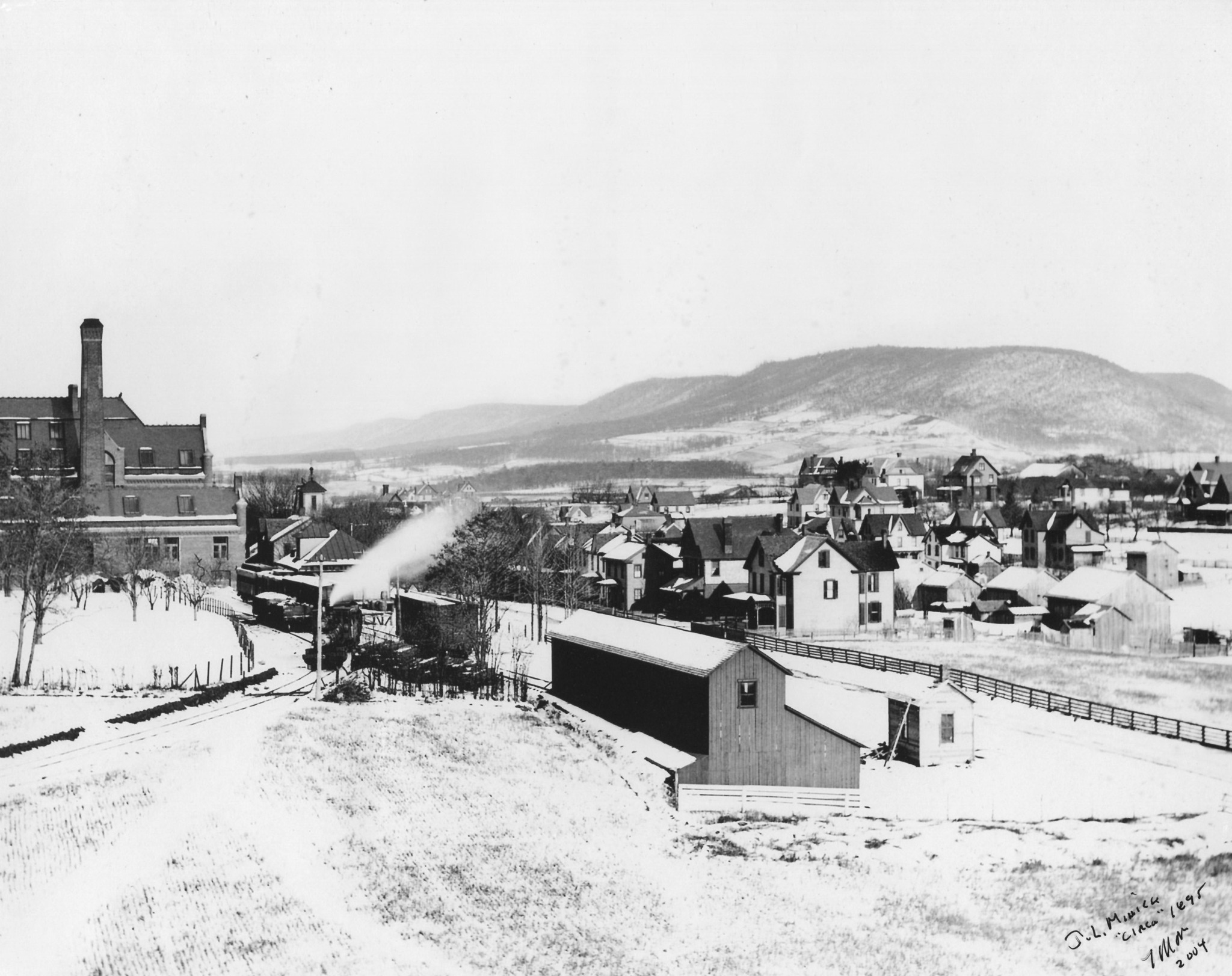
BCRR station in State College with Mount Nittany in the background, c. 1892–1910

The Farmers' High School of Pennsylvania was founded in 1855 on 400-acres of land in what was Harris Township. Although the area was isolated from most of the state, the land was reasonably affordable and the Nittany Valley was rich in limestone, causing exceptional soil fertility. The land was clear-cut for charcoal, powering the adjacent Centre Furnace. In 1862 the school was renamed to The Agricultural College of Pennsylvania.

In 1875, College Township formed, taking up most of what is now State College. In 1885, the Pennsylvania Railroad opened a train station in nearby Lemont, which served as State College's main connection with the outside world. Passengers would have to catch an autobus or a hack to complete the journey to State College from the Lemont station. Construction of a new train station on West College Avenue was finally completed in 1892, connecting State College to the Bellefonte Central Railroad (BCRR) via Struble. The journey along the 20-mile-long line took 50 minutes, meandering through the Scotia Barrens and the Buffalo Run Valley before making it to Bellefonte. Regular passenger trains continued until 1917, while mixed passenger and freight trains continued until 1945. On August 29, 1896, State College officially separated from College Township becoming a borough.

From 1900 to 1910, the area surrounding Downtown's early core became more developed. The hilly area south of Beaver Avenue became known as Highland Park, before being referred to as the Highlands. The borough began expanding in 1916 with annexations from Ferguson and College Township. In 1917 the borough added the Hamilton, Highland Park, and South Side additions to its boundary. French professor I.P. Foster and businessman J. Laird Holmes donated land for the creation of Holmes-Foster, which would become the borough's first park in 1921; the borough's first hospital would open a few blocks north of the park in 1919.

=== Great Depression and WWII ===
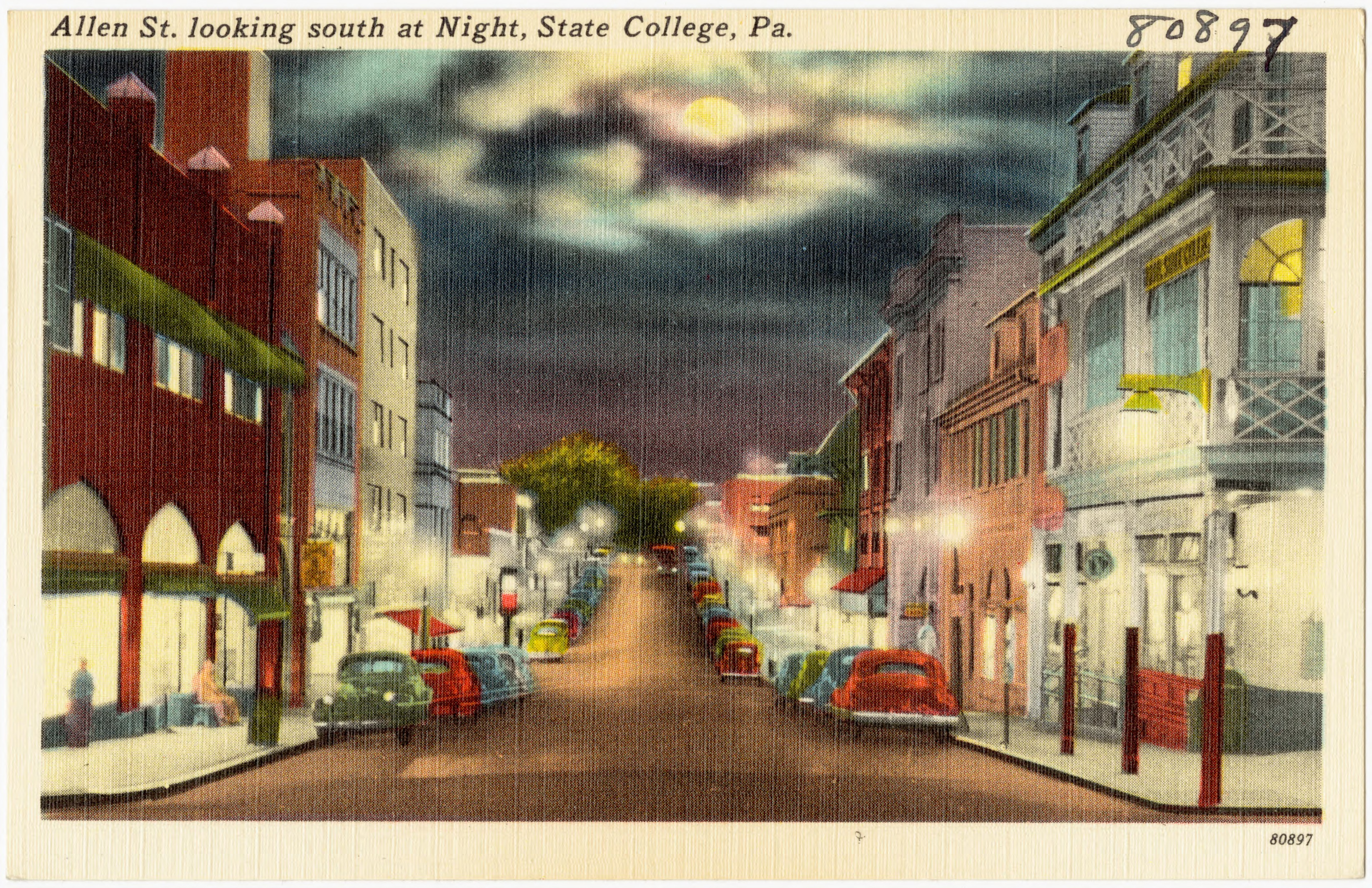
Allen Street looking south at night c. 1930

In 1930, the BCRR built a line from State College to Fairbrook, though it ceased using the line in 1933 due to the economic impact of the Great Depression. Compared to the rest the country, State College was much more economically stable due to the expanding Pennsylvania State University. This led to State College and the surrounding townships being nicknamed "Happy Valley." The borough expanded throughout the 1930s with three more annexations, including Lytle's Addition. In 1940, State College eclipsed Bellefonte in population with around 6,226 people.

The influx of veterans returning from the war led to a post-war building boom from 1946 to 1947 especially around the Highlands and South End. Windcrest, a trailer park community built to accommodate returning veterans, was rented to married student veteran families.

=== Cold War and civil rights era ===
In 1951, the Penn State Nittany Lions men's soccer team flew to Iran following a request from U.S. State Department. The team was meant to play several exhibition matches in an attempt to "further goodwill" between the United States and Iran. The Nittany Lions lost their first match in Isfahan 2–0 in front of 5,000 spectators.

Milton S. Eisenhower, the brother of United States President Dwight D. Eisenhower, changed the name of the Pennsylvania State College to The Pennsylvania State University in 1953. He also sought to persuade the town to change its name from "State College" to "Mt. Nittany," but the referendum failed. Shortly after, the university would get its own postal address under the name “University Park.”

On January 21, 1965, at the height of the civil rights movement, Dr. Martin Luther King Jr. gave a speech on desegregation to an audience of about 8,000 community members and students in Rec Hall.

In 1970, in protest to the Vietnam War, attempts were made by university students to divest money from the Applied Research Laboratory, which produces torpedoes. A sit-in at Old Main led to the arrest of at least 30 people. Protests against the ARL escalated in 1972 when about 2,000 protesters blocking College Avenue and North Atherton Street were met with police in riot gear. The following day more than 5,000 protesters marched to the ARL, which temporarily shut down at the request of the university and Lieutenant Governor Ernest Kline.

In 1973, State College adopted a home rule charter which took effect in 1976; since then, it has not been governed by the state's Borough Code, although it retains "Borough of State College" as its official name.

In 1974, as the railroads in State College were abandoned, the Centre Area Transportation Authority (CATA) was incorporated. CATA began operating bus services from the borough to the surrounding townships, while the Penn State University operated the Campus Loops.

=== Construction boom ===
State College remained resistant to the economic shocks of the 2008 Great Recession as it did during the Great Depression. This led to a wave of investment into high-rises and other construction projects in the area. The tallest building in State College, the Fraser Centre, was finished in 2015. There have been several other high-rises built in Downtown State College since the Fraser Centre was completed, and one in the West End.

In 2011 an estimated 10,000 people protested downtown in support of the Penn State head football coach Joe Paterno after he was fired from the team following the Penn State child sex abuse scandal. The protests led to an estimated $200,000 in damages, including the destruction of a WTAJ news van.

Beginning in 2015 the borough council voted to change the name of State College to "City of THON" for 46 hours in honor of THON, the largest student-run philanthropic organization in the world, a tradition that would continue every year since.

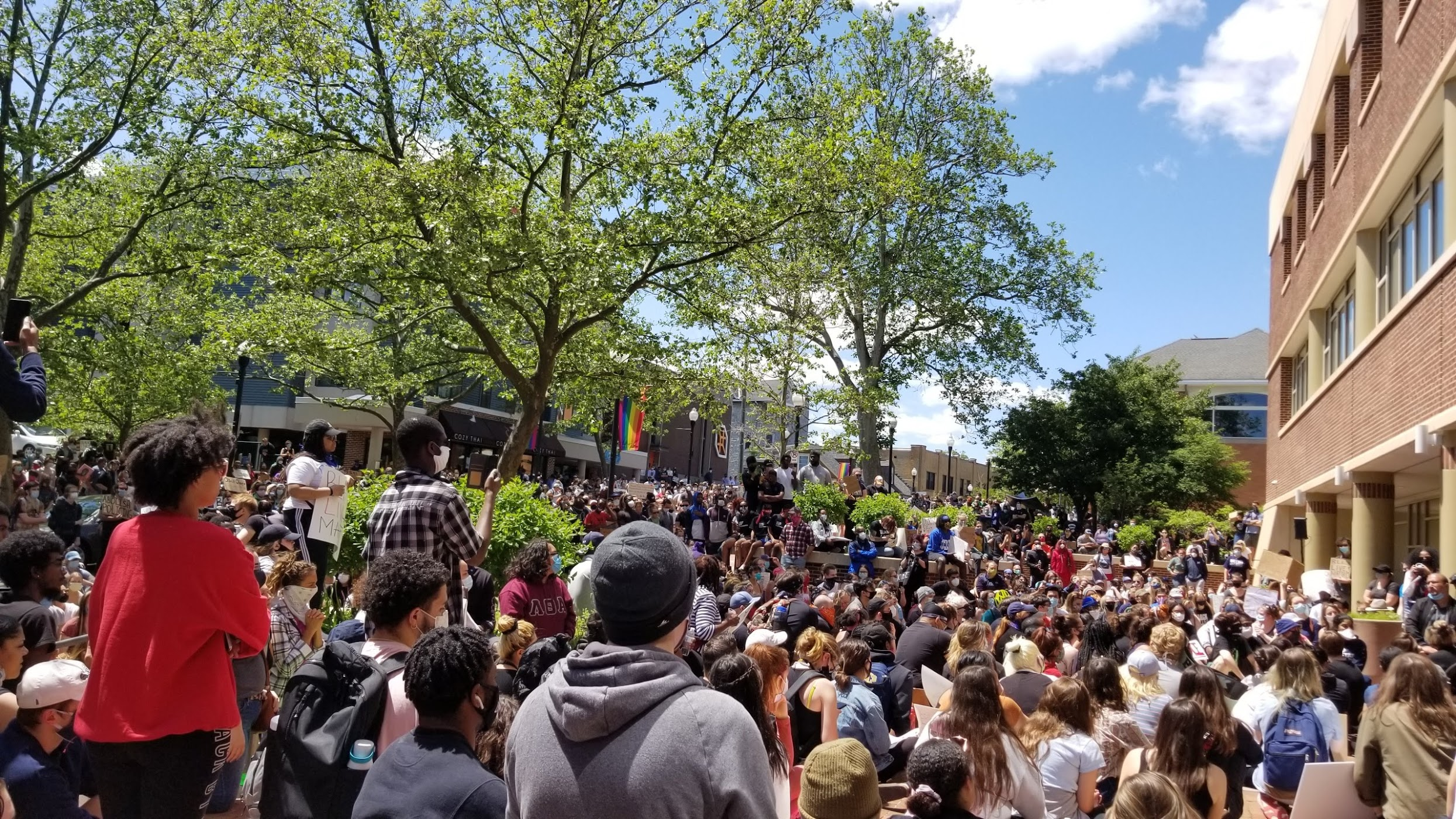
Protesters outside the State College Municipal Building in 2020

On March 20, 2019, State College police officer Jordan Pieniazek shot and killed Osaze Osagie, a 29-year-old man, during a wellness check. An investigation by the state police was passed down to the district attorney of Centre County, Bernie Cantorna, who determined that the shooting was justified. Protests began after the district attorney's report was released on May 8, 2019. On May 31, 2020, thousands took part in a protest downtown against police brutality with an emphasis on the murder of George Floyd and killing of Osaze Osagie. It became one of the largest protests in the county's history. Demonstrations would continue for years, including a 24-hour occupation of the State College Borough municipal building in November 2020 and a march in 2021 outside the Marvin Gardens apartments where Osagie was fatally shot. In 2023, the federal judge for the Middle District of Pennsylvania, Matthew William Brann, dismissed a lawsuit against the borough and police involved. March 20 was declared “Osaze Osagie Day of Remembrance” by the State College Borough in 2023. Osagie's parents established two scholarships, The Osaze's Heart Community Service Scholarship for racially underrepresented State High seniors, and The Osaze Olufemi Osagie Memorial Scholarship for Educational Equity for Penn State students with intellectual and mental health diagnoses.

The borough became the first municipality in Pennsylvania to pass a resolution for a ceasefire in the Gaza war. The measure passed unanimously on December 20, 2023 after months of marches and demonstrations. A copy of the resolution was forwarded to President Joe Biden; senators John Fetterman and Bob Casey Jr.; and representative Glenn Thompson.

== Geography ==
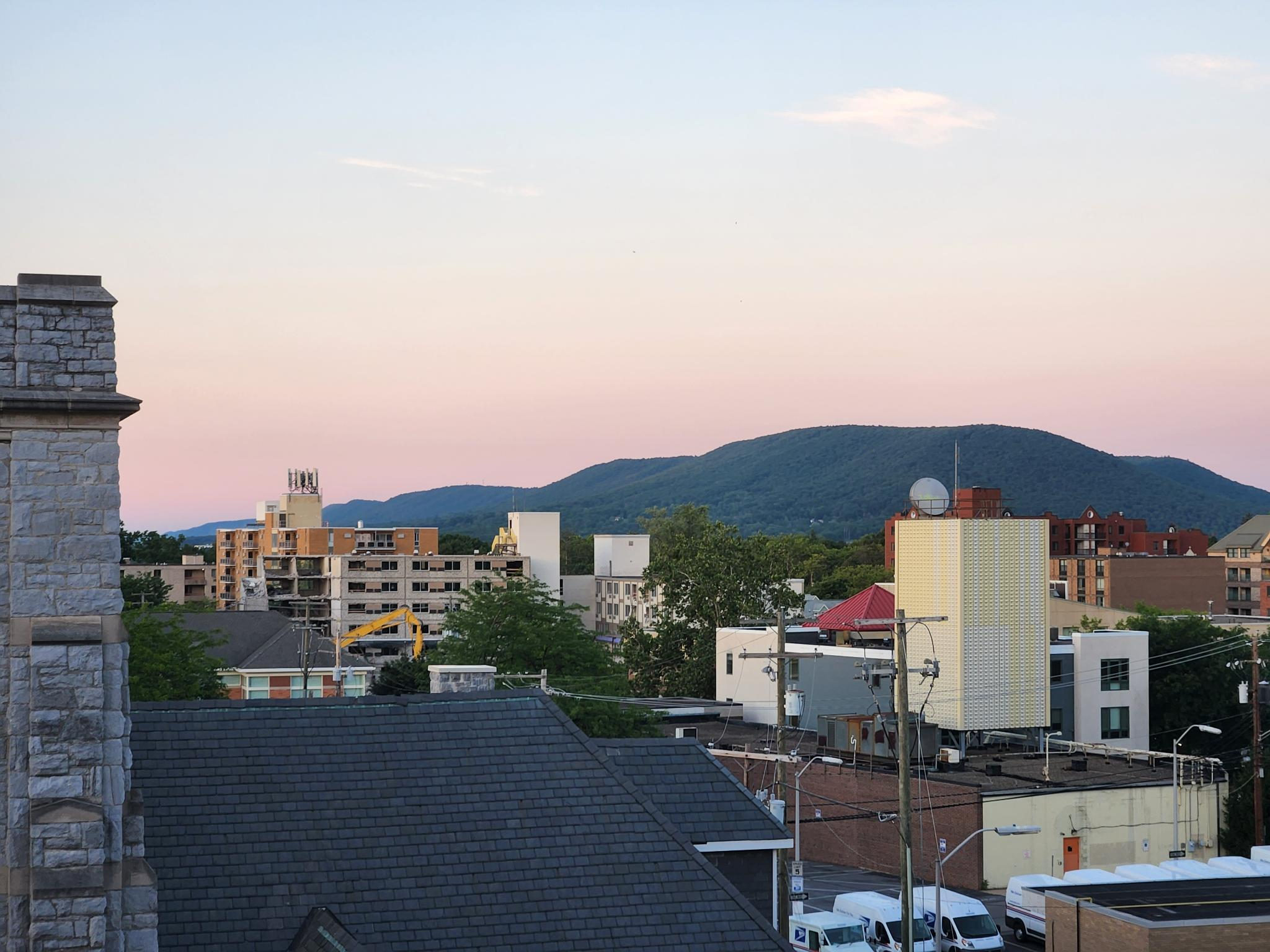
View of Mount Nittany from downtown State College

=== Topography ===
According to the U.S. Census Bureau, the borough has a total area of 4.5 square miles (12 km^{2}), all land. It is surrounded by large tracts of farmland and an expanse of Appalachian Mountain ranges and forests. Its location within a valley makes it prone to frequent rain, snowfall, and flooding. State College is in the Susquehanna watershed. The borough is the nexus, and most populous municipality in Happy Valley. State College is also a part of the larger Nittany Valley. The Nittany Valley is part of the geologic ridge-and-valley province of the Appalachian Mountains. It is located at the approximate geographic center of Pennsylvania. The borough is bordered by Ferguson and College Township.

==== Neighborhoods ====
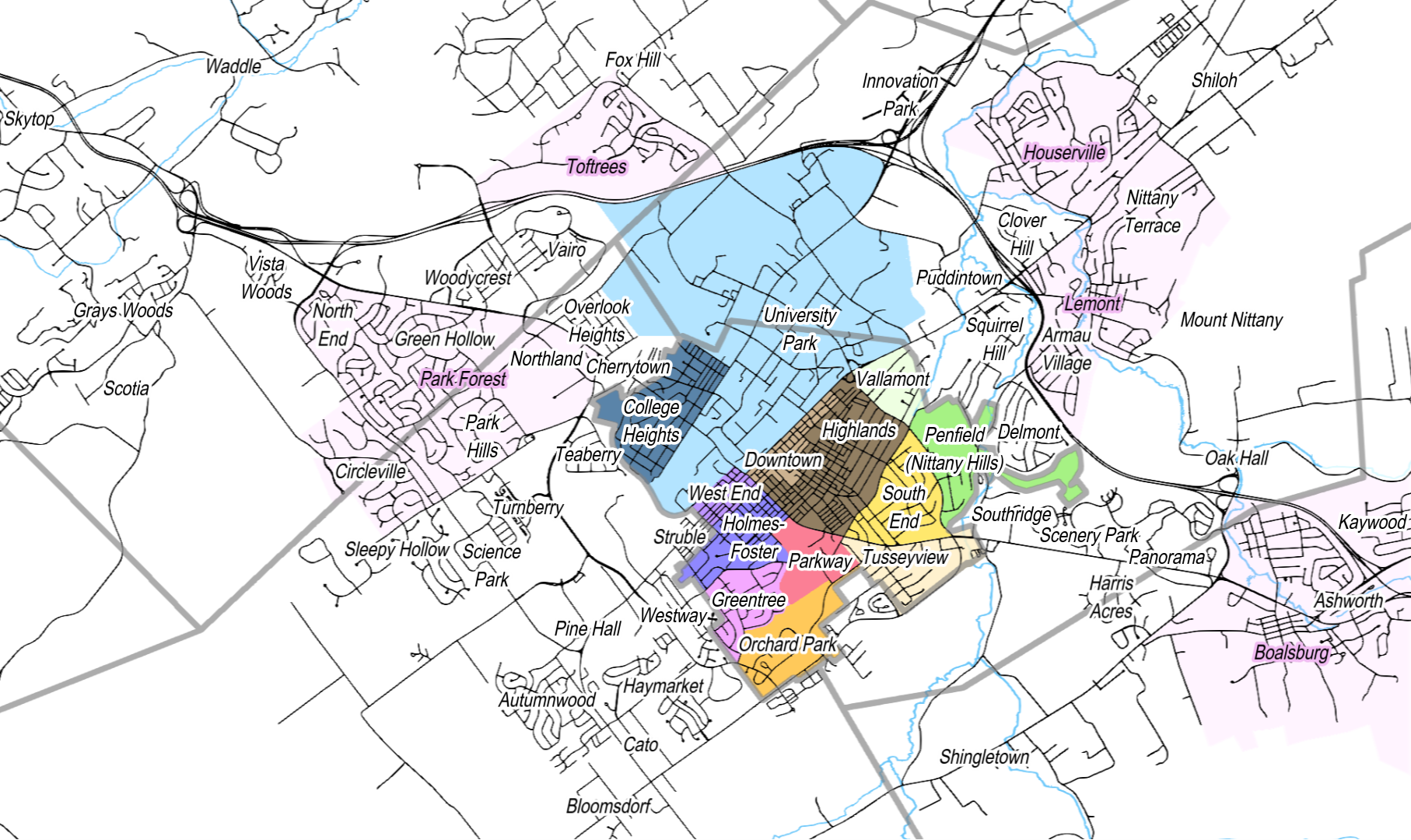
Neighborhoods in State College and the surrounding townships

The Borough of State College has twelve neighborhoods and half of University Park. The Highlands have around ten thousand people, making it the largest neighborhood in the borough, followed by Downtown and Orchard Park. The Highlands are a mix of apartments, townhouses, single-family homes, businesses, and parks. The neighborhood features working class areas like Lytle Hill and Marvin Gardens, and student areas like Frat Row. The Holmes–Foster–Highlands Historic District includes parts of Holmes-Foster, the Highlands, and the West End. Holmes-Foster and the West End were two of the first neighborhoods to be developed due to their proximity to Downtown, University Park, and the Bellefonte Central Railroad. Part of College Heights makes up the College Heights Historic District which was created in 1935 and features the College Heights Service Station. It took six annexations from College Township from 1930 to 1968 to officially bring the South End and Nittany Hills (also Penfield) neighborhoods in the borough. Vallamont and Penfield are the least populated neighborhoods, both of which are in the foothills of Mount Nittany on the east side of town. Parkway, short for Westerly Parkway Plaza, is home to State High, the Delta Program, the Westerly Parkway Wetlands, and the Parkway Plaza Apartments, which were built in the 1960s. Orchard Park is home to the South Hills School of Business & Technology. Residents of Downtown (99%), the West End (96%), and Orchard Park (89%) are largely renters; whereas Greentree (93%), College Heights (70%), and Penfield (68%) residents are predominately homeowners.

==== Downtown ====
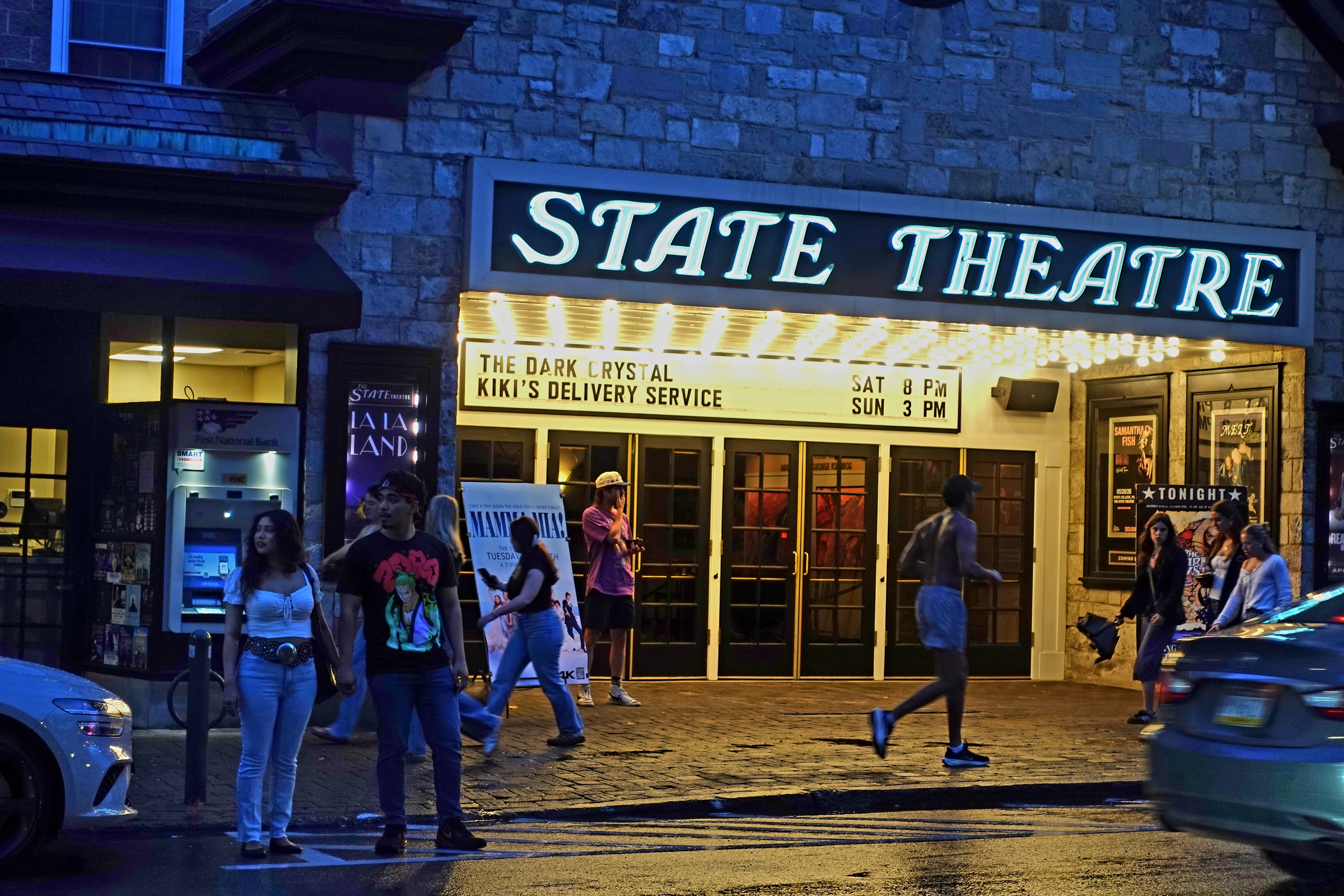
The State Theatre at night

Downtown brings in over two million tourists a year, and features 25 major festivals, including Arts Fest, Latin Festival, Fall Festival, and First Night festival. The neighborhood is home to Schlow Library, Memorial Field, Sydney Friedman Park, MLK Plaza, the State Theater, and several murals and art installations including the Calder Way Fresco, Dreams Take Flight, and the MLK Plaza mural depicting King's 1965 speech at Penn State.

The 2010s saw a construction boom downtown, with several mixed-use towers developed, including Rise, Metropolitan, Fraser Centre, and Here State College, and others. Unlike older towers, many of the newer buildings are mixed-use, with retail on the ground floor, offices on the next couple floors up, and apartments on the top floors.

The Downtown area has seen large protests over past the couple of decades, particularly at the Allen Street Gates and the Martin Luther King Jr. Plaza. In recent years, marches for May Day, Black Lives Matter, trans rights, and against Israeli war crimes have taken place in the Downtown streets.

==== University Park ====
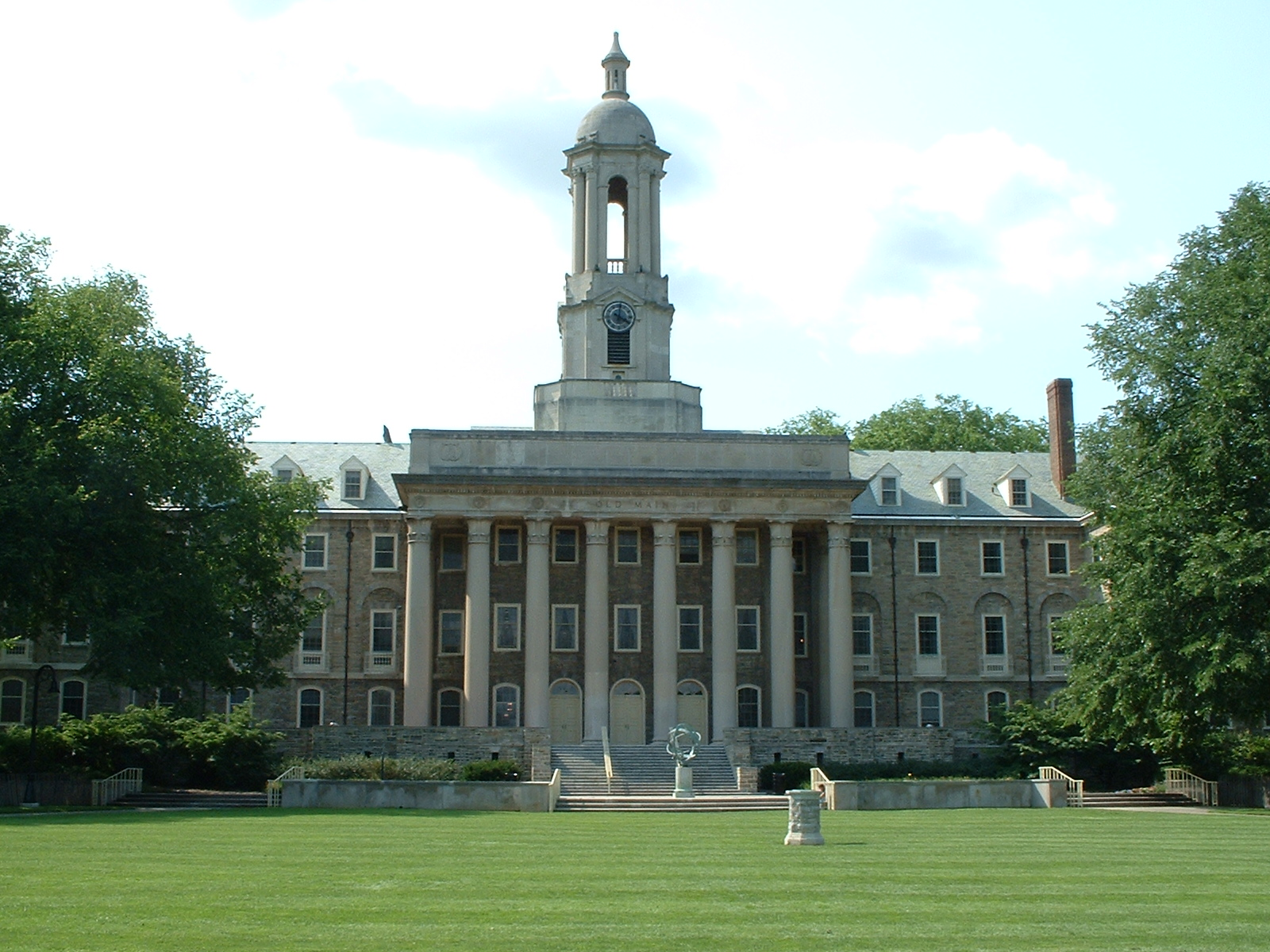
Old Main in the summer

University Park is the main campus of Pennsylvania State University and is split between the Borough of State College and College Township. It is home to Old Main, Penn State's first building of major significance, completed in 1863; Palmer Museum of Art, visual arts facility and cultural resource for Penn State and local community; and Penn State Creamery, the world's largest university creamery. University Park is also home to Beaver Stadium, the second-largest stadium in the Western Hemisphere and the home of Penn State Nittany Lions football and the Bryce Jordan Center, home of the Men's and Women's Penn State basketball and other indoor sports and entertainment events; although these structures are located in College Township.

==== Historic Districts ====
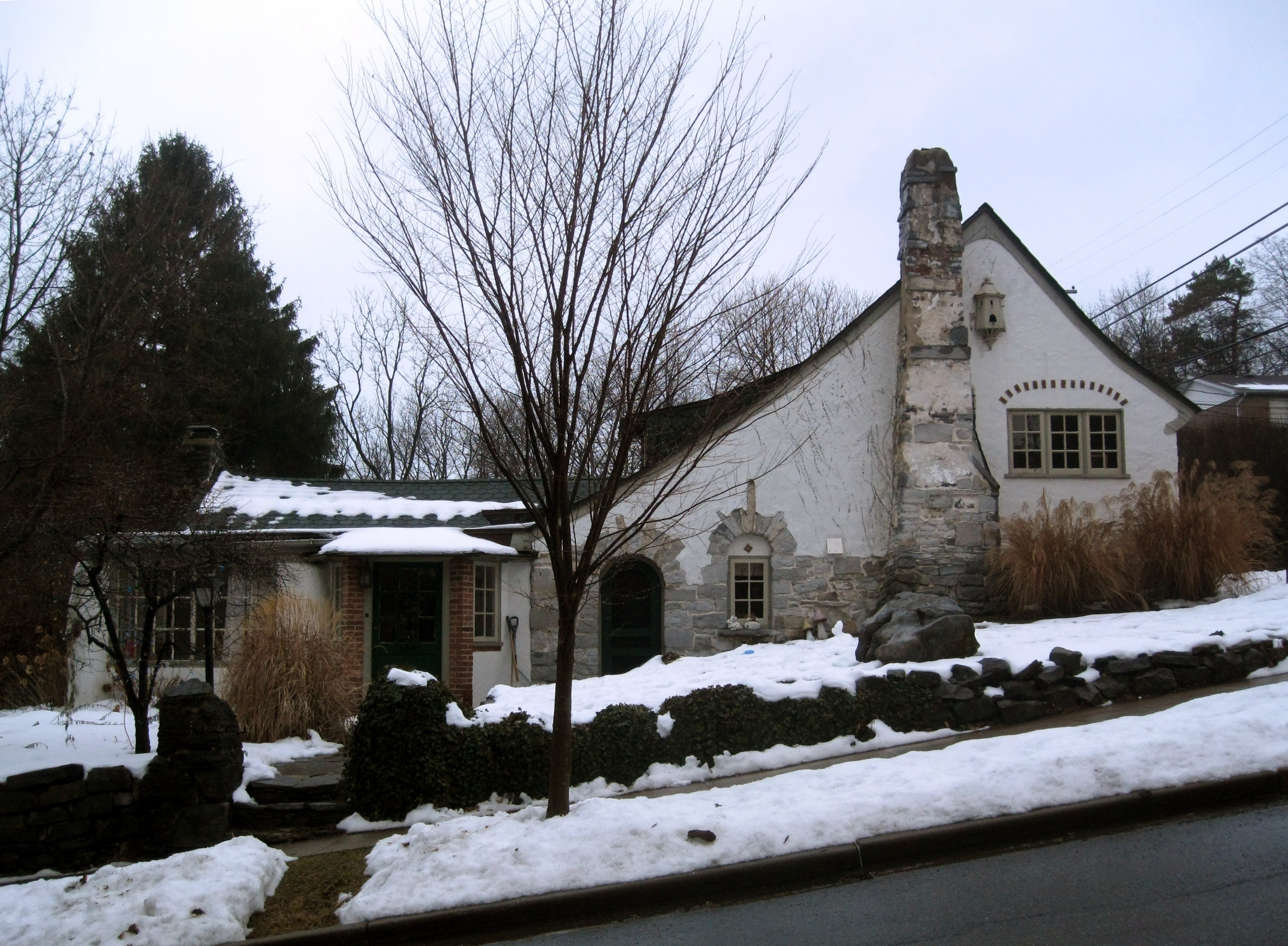
Camelot is a historic house in the borough. Built in 1922, it is listed on the National Register of Historic Places.

The Holmes–Foster–Highlands Historic District with 727 contributing buildings, and College Heights Historic District with 278 were added to the National Register of Historic Places in 1995. Houses come in popular early twentieth-century architectural styles including Colonial Revival, Tudor Revival, and Bungalow. The historic Camelot house is also in the Holmes–Foster–Highlands Historic District while the College Heights Service Station and College Heights School are in the College Heights Historic District.

=== Climate ===
State College has a humid continental climate (Köppen Dfa). Temperatures average 27.2 °F (−2.7 °C) in January and 72.2 °F (22.3 °C) in July. Annual precipitation averages 41.53 inches (105 cm), with 43.8 inches (111 cm) of annual snowfall on average. With a period of record dating back to 1893, the lowest temperature recorded was −20 °F (−29 °C) on February 10, 1899, and the highest was 102 °F (39 °C) on July 17, 1988, and July 9, 1936.

Weather in State College is strongly influenced by the mountain and valley topology of the area. The surrounding mountains cause significantly lower temperatures in the winter, and make summer heat waves much rarer than in the rest of the state. Precipitation is about 20% lower than areas at comparable elevations, again due to the surrounding mountains. Snowfall typically occurs between October and April, but has happened as late as June.

Climate data for State College, Pennsylvania (1991–2020 normals, extremes 1893–present)
Month	Jan	Feb	Mar	Apr	May	Jun	Jul	Aug	Sep	Oct	Nov	Dec	Year
Record high °F (°C)	71 (22)	74 (23)	86 (30)	94 (34)	93 (34)	96 (36)	102 (39)	101 (38)	98 (37)	90 (32)	81 (27)	71 (22)	102 (39)
Mean maximum °F (°C)	56.5 (13.6)	58.9 (14.9)	69.0 (20.6)	81.3 (27.4)	86.7 (30.4)	89.2 (31.8)	91.0 (32.8)	89.3 (31.8)	85.9 (29.9)	78.1 (25.6)	68.7 (20.4)	58.2 (14.6)	92.4 (33.6)
Mean daily maximum °F (°C)	33.9 (1.1)	36.8 (2.7)	45.6 (7.6)	59.2 (15.1)	69.4 (20.8)	77.0 (25.0)	81.1 (27.3)	79.3 (26.3)	72.3 (22.4)	60.7 (15.9)	48.8 (9.3)	38.4 (3.6)	58.5 (14.7)
Daily mean °F (°C)	27.2 (−2.7)	29.1 (−1.6)	37.0 (2.8)	49.3 (9.6)	59.8 (15.4)	68.1 (20.1)	72.2 (22.3)	70.4 (21.3)	63.2 (17.3)	51.9 (11.1)	41.2 (5.1)	32.2 (0.1)	50.1 (10.1)
Mean daily minimum °F (°C)	20.5 (−6.4)	21.5 (−5.8)	28.3 (−2.1)	39.4 (4.1)	50.3 (10.2)	59.3 (15.2)	63.3 (17.4)	61.6 (16.4)	54.1 (12.3)	43.0 (6.1)	33.5 (0.8)	26.0 (−3.3)	41.7 (5.4)
Mean minimum °F (°C)	2.8 (−16.2)	5.6 (−14.7)	11.6 (−11.3)	25.8 (−3.4)	36.4 (2.4)	45.9 (7.7)	52.9 (11.6)	51.1 (10.6)	41.2 (5.1)	30.7 (−0.7)	20.4 (−6.4)	11.3 (−11.5)	0.5 (−17.5)
Record low °F (°C)	−18 (−28)	−20 (−29)	−9 (−23)	1 (−17)	27 (−3)	34 (1)	40 (4)	30 (−1)	28 (−2)	16 (−9)	1 (−17)	−13 (−25)	−20 (−29)
Average precipitation inches (mm)	2.92 (74)	2.46 (62)	3.38 (86)	3.51 (89)	3.64 (92)	4.09 (104)	3.79 (96)	4.16 (106)	3.95 (100)	3.46 (88)	2.99 (76)	3.18 (81)	41.53 (1,055)
Average snowfall inches (cm)	11.3 (29)	11.6 (29)	9.4 (24)	0.9 (2.3)	0.0 (0.0)	0.0 (0.0)	0.0 (0.0)	0.0 (0.0)	0.0 (0.0)	0.4 (1.0)	2.6 (6.6)	7.6 (19)	43.8 (111)
Average precipitation days (≥ 0.01 in)	13.6	11.4	12.0	13.6	14.5	12.3	12.4	11.2	10.7	11.4	10.5	12.8	146.4
Average snowy days (≥ 0.1 in)	8.4	7.3	4.4	1.0	0.0	0.0	0.0	0.0	0.0	0.3	1.6	5.6	28.6
Source: NOAA

== Demographics ==
Historical population
Census	Pop.	Note	%±
1900	851		—
1910	1,425		67.5%
1920	2,405		68.8%
1930	4,450		85.0%
1940	6,226		39.9%
1950	17,227		176.7%
1960	22,409		30.1%
1970	32,833		46.5%
1980	36,130		10.0%
1990	38,923		7.7%
2000	38,420		−1.3%
2010	42,034		9.4%
2020	40,501		−3.6%

According to the 2010 census, there were 42,034 people, 12,610 households, and 3,069 families residing in the borough. The population density was 9,258.6 inhabitants per square mile (3,574.8/km^{2}). There were 13,007 housing units at an average density of 2,865.0 per square mile (1,106.2/km^{2}). The racial makeup of the borough was 83.2% White, 3.8% Black or African American, 0.2% Native American, 9.8% Asian, 1.0% Other, and 2.0% from two or more races. 3.9% of the population were of Hispanic or Latino ancestry. 22,681 or 54.0% of borough residents were males and 19,353 or 46.0% were females.

A 2014 estimate had the racial makeup of the borough as 78.9% Non-Hispanic White, 5.6% Black or African American, 0.5% Native American and Alaska Native, 11.5% Asian, 0.1% Native Hawaiian and other Pacific Islander, 0.8% Some other race, and 2.2% two or more races. 4.4% were Hispanic or Latino (of any race).

Of the 12,610 households, 9.1% had children under the age of 18 living with them, 18.2% were married couples living together, 3.8% had a female householder with no husband present, 2.4% had a male householder with no wife present, and 75.6% were non-families. 33.6% of all households were made up of individuals, and 5.1% had someone living alone who was 65 years of age or older. The average household size was 2.30 and the average family size was 2.71.

The age distribution of the borough was overwhelmingly influenced by its student population: 5.1% of the population was under the age of 18, 70.6% from 18 to 24, 13.1% from 25 to 44, 6.5% from 45 to 64, and 4.7% was 65 years of age or older. The median age was 22 years.

The median income for a household in the borough was $23,513, and the median income for a family was $58,953. The per capita income for the borough was $13,336. 46.9% of the population and 9.8% of families were below the poverty line. Out of the total population, 10.6% of those under the age of 18 and 2.2% of those 65 and older were living below the poverty line. However, traditional measures of income and poverty can be very misleading when applied to a community like State College that is dominated by students.

The population of the State College metropolitan statistical area was 153,990 as of the 2010 U.S. census.

== Economy ==
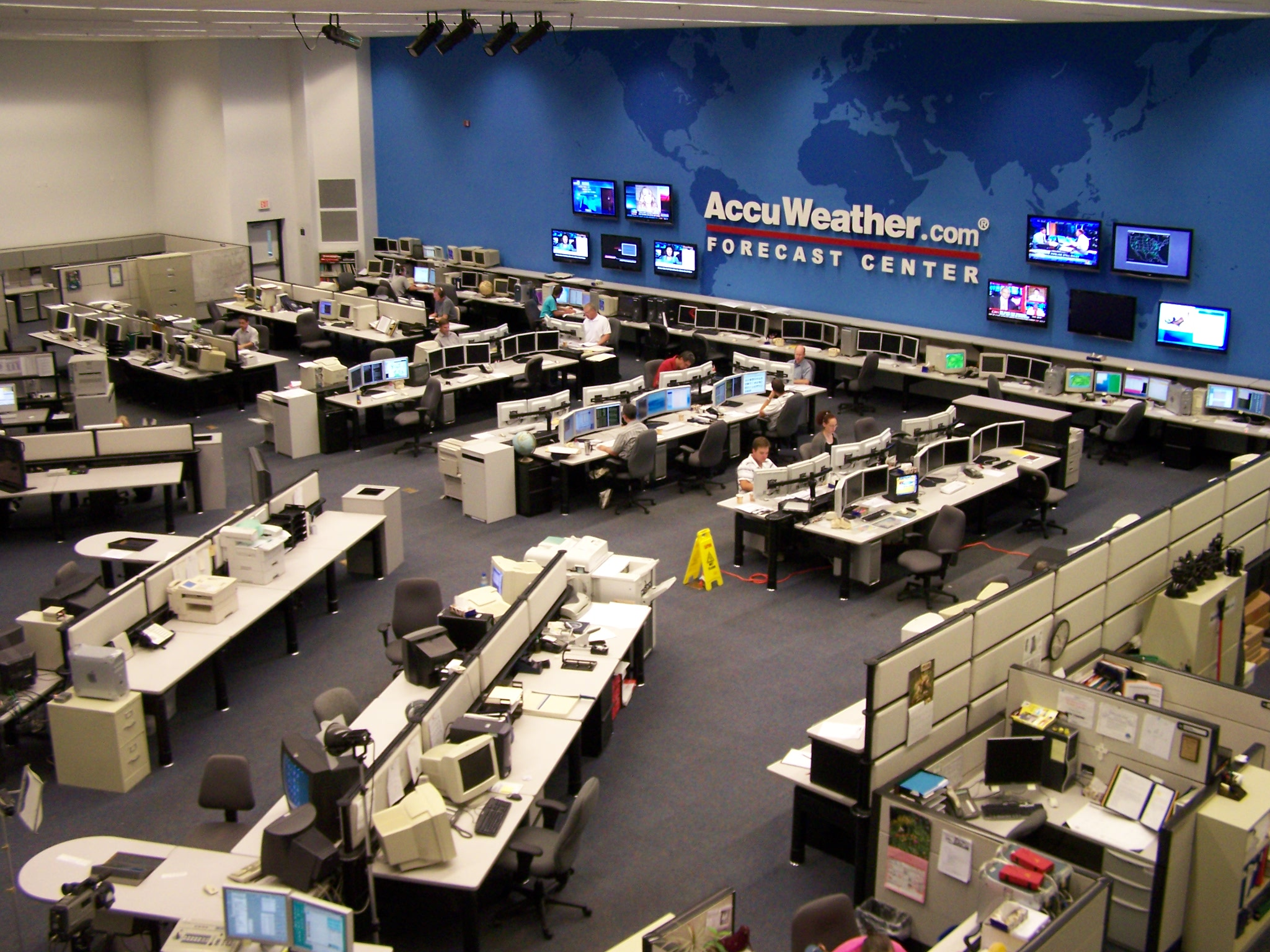
AccuWeather Forecast Center in neighboring Ferguson Township

Pennsylvania State University is the largest single employer in the region, employing over 27,000 full- and part-time workers as of 2016. Other industries in the area include health care, retail, hospitality services, construction, and government.

Notable businesses founded in the State College area include AccuWeather, Herlocher Foods, KCF Technologies, Minitab, and Uni-Mart.

=== Largest Employers ===
Top 10 largest employers in State College area in 2026.
Rank	Employer
1	Pennsylvania State University
2	Mount Nittany Medical Center
3	State College Area School District
4	Government of Pennsylvania
5	Walmart
6	Glenn O. Hawbaker, Inc. (construction)
7	Mount Nittany Health
8	Centre County Government
9	Geisinger Health System
10	Federal Government

== Arts and culture ==
=== Events ===
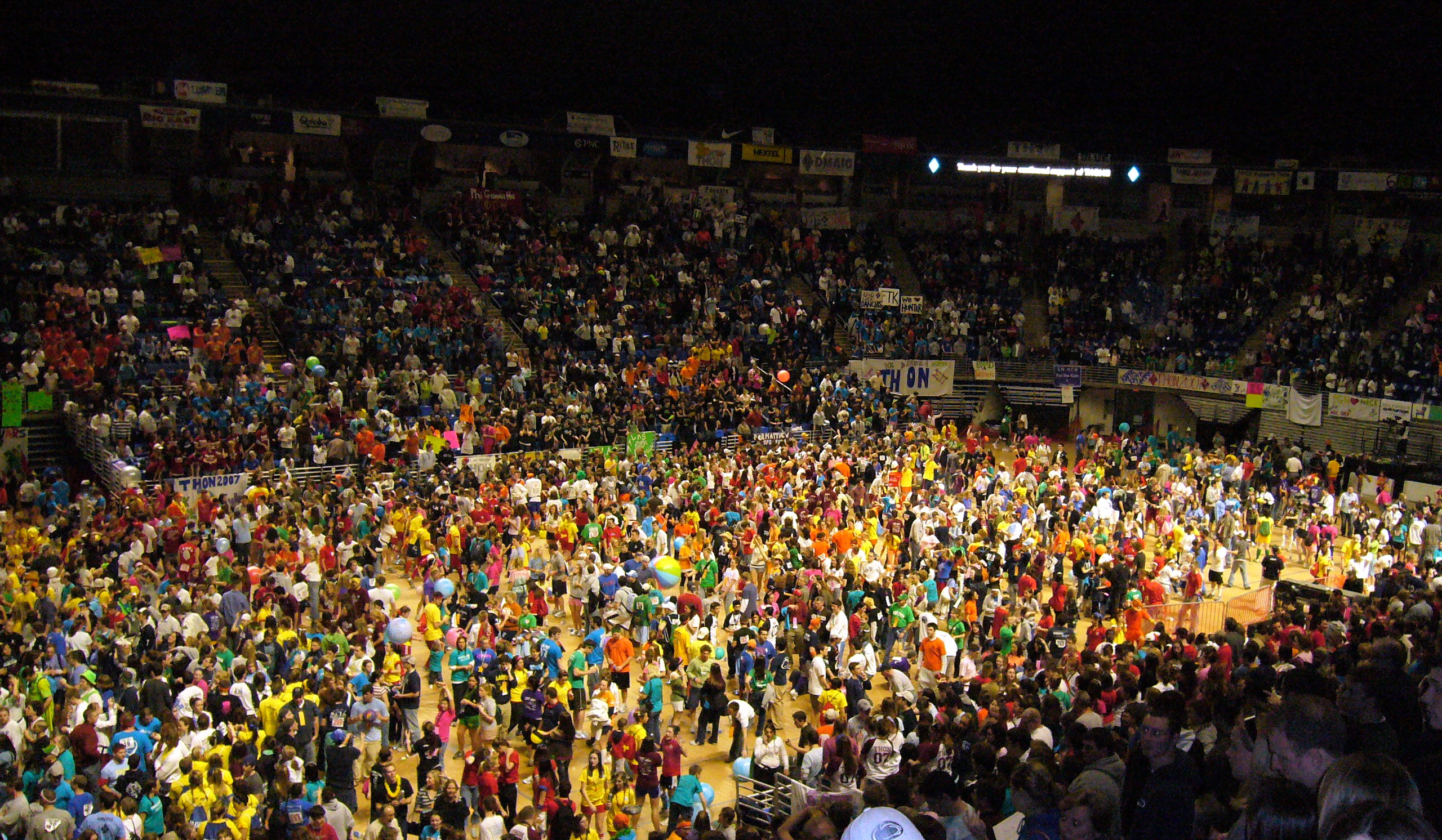
THON has been held at the Bryce Jordan Center at Penn State since 2007.

The Central Pennsylvania Festival of the Arts, usually referred to as "Arts Fest", is held downtown every July. The five-day festival features artists from around the country and draws more than 125,000 visitors. Streets are closed off and lined with booths where people can buy paintings, pottery, jewelry, and other hand-made goods. There borough hosts musical performances, plays, and food vendors selling everything from funnel cakes to Indian cuisine. Another event hosted by the Central Pennsylvania Festival of the Arts is "First Night", an annual New Year's Eve celebration known for its display of carved ice sculptures in downtown State College.

The Penn State IFC/Panhellenic Dance Marathon, commonly referred to as THON, is a 46-hour dance marathon that takes place every February on the University Park campus with the goal of raising money for the Four Diamonds Foundation. A number of events throughout the year pave the way to February's THON weekend.

Blue-White Football Weekend occurs in April and includes a carnival, fireworks, food vendors, a student entertainment stage, live music, a parade, and more. On game day, autograph sessions with the football student-athletes is held in Beaver Stadium prior to kickoff of the Blue-White football intra-squad scrimmage game.

In February 2017, State College set a Guinness World Record for the largest display of ice lanterns. Beating out the previous record held by Vuollerim, Sweden with 2,652 ice lanterns, 5,226 lighted ice luminaries were displayed across South Allen Street in Downtown State College.

=== Cuisine ===
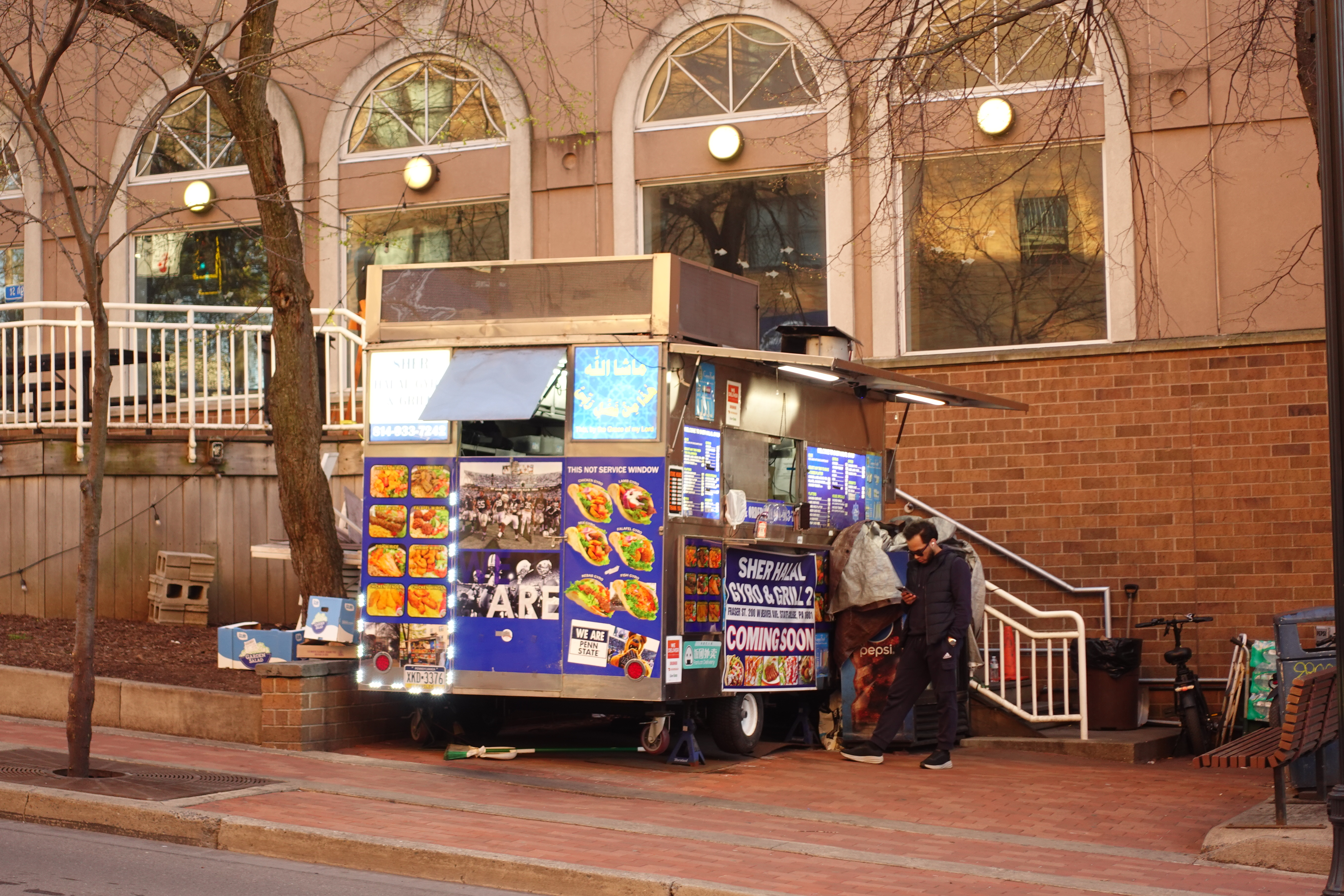
A halal cart on South Pugh Street

State College cuisine is influenced by its agrarian history and proximity to farmland with several restaurants sourcing meat, produce, and dairy products from local farms. The Penn State Berkey Creamery sells over 750,000 ice cream cones yearly, sourced from local dairy farms. In 2018, the creamery introduced a “grilled stickies” ice cream flavor in honor of the grilled stickies pastries originally sold at the former Ye Olde College Diner.

State College has a diverse food scene influenced by its immigrant community; which includes Iraqi, Oaxacan, South Asian, East Asian, and Eastern European cuisine. The area is also home to several international grocery stores.

=== Music ===
The Nittany Valley Symphony, a community orchestra founded in 1967, performs at the Eisenhower Auditorium.

=== Library ===
State College is served by the Schlow Centre Region Library.

== Sports ==
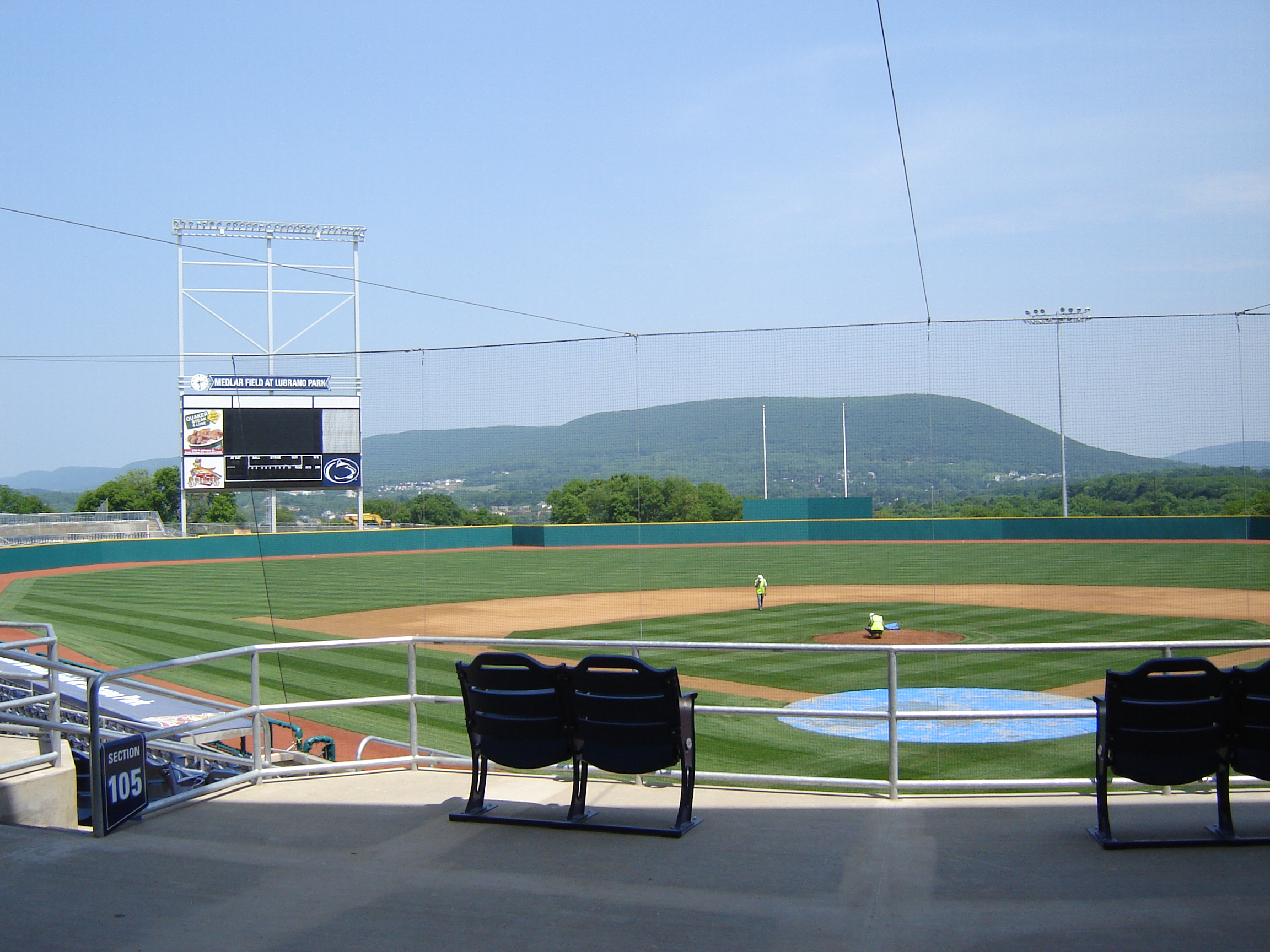
Medlar Field at Lubrano Park, home of the State College Spikes

State College is most known for Penn State Nittany Lions football, which draws over 100,000 fans to Beaver Stadium on home games. The borough is home to the State College Spikes, a minor league baseball team that is part of the MLB Draft League and plays their home games at Medlar Field at Lubrano Park, and Penn State baseball. Penn State also has Division 1 teams in basketball, ice hockey, soccer, volleyball, and wrestling.

The Lemont Ducks play at the Community Field in State College. The team is a part of the Centre County Baseball League, Pennsylvania's oldest amateur baseball league, which began in 1932.

Rec Hall is a field house located on the University Park campus of the Pennsylvania State University. It was opened on January 15, 1929, and remains in use. It is home to the Penn State Nittany Lions women's and men's volleyball teams, and Penn State Nittany Lions wrestling. Rec Hall has a banked indoor track of approximately 257 yards around, or roughly 6.85 laps per mile.

Pegula Ice Arena is a 6,014-seat multi-purpose arena in University Park, on the campus of Penn State University, which opened October 11, 2013, to replace the 1,350-seat Penn State Ice Pavilion. The facility is located on the corner of Curtin Road and University Drive near the Bryce Jordan Center.

== Parks and recreation ==
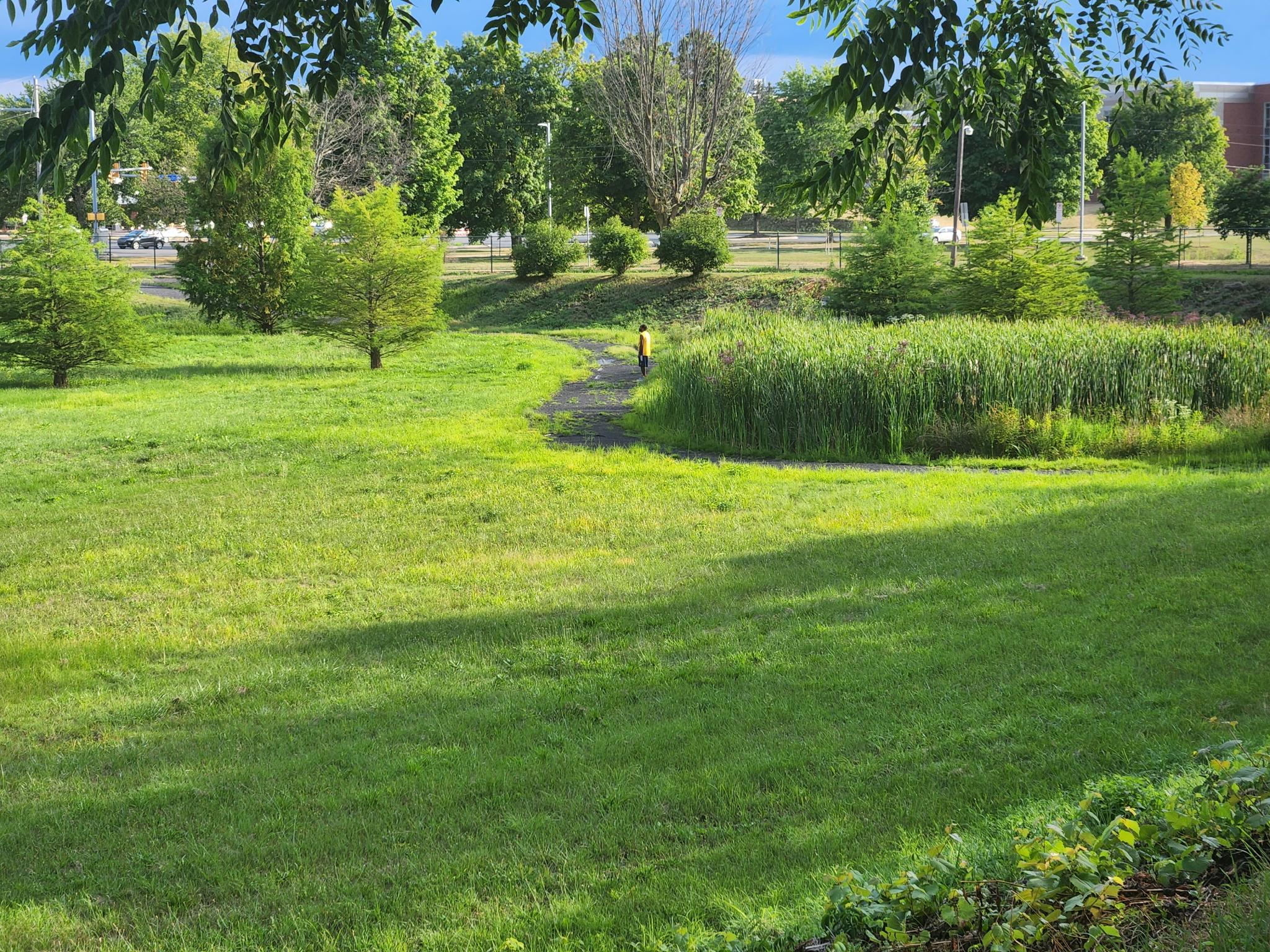
Parkway Wetlands

In 1914, the State College School Board purchased a sinkhole along Fraser and Nittany avenues to build a football field and track in the “natural amphitheater.” During the Great Depression the project received a $40,000 grant from the Works Progress Administration, $5,000 from the school district, and additional federal funds. The sinkhole was originally nicknamed "The Hollow", though it would later be named Memorial Field in dedication to State College High School graduates killed in both World Wars. In September 1937, the stadium hosted its first football game between State College and Yeagertown. State College would win 52–7 in front of an audience of 3,000 spectators. $500,000 was spent on drainage to protect against flooding in the former sinkhole. In 1966 the area between Memorial Field and the post office was turned into a parklet. Originally named Central Parklet, the park's name was changed in 2009 to Sidney Friedman Park after Altoona-born business owner and real estate mogul Sidney Friedman died.

The Westerly Parkway Wetlands Education Center was transformed from a drainage basin into a functional, sustainable wetland.

Sunset Park in College Heights is connected to Gerhold Wildflower Trail; Walnut Springs in Vallamont and Lederer Park in Penfield are largely forested; South Hills Park, Tussey View Park, and Nittany Village Park are in Tusseyview; Orchard Park is split between the Orchard Park neighborhood and Greentree; High Point Park is also in Orchard Park and is the proposed site of a skate park; Holmes-Foster Park is in Holmes-Foster and Greentree; Community Field is in Parkway; East Fairmount Park is in the Highlands; and Smithfield Park is in the South End. Additionally half of the Arboretum including the H.O. Smith Botanical Gardens are in the borough.

== Government ==
=== Borough ===
The mayor is Ezra Nanes.

State College is a member of the Centre Region Council of Governments (CRCOG). Other members are:

- College Township
- Ferguson Township
- Halfmoon Township
- Harris Township
- Patton Township

The county seat of Centre County is Bellefonte, approximately 12 miles northeast of State College.

=== State and federal ===
At the federal level, State College is located in Pennsylvania's 15th congressional district, represented by Republican Glenn Thompson.

Republican Greg Rothman represents Pennsylvania Senate, District 34, and Democrat Scott Conklin represents Pennsylvania House of Representatives, District 77.

State College Borough falls under jurisdiction of the following district courts. The jurisdictions include civil claims and summary offenses. Higher level courts are located in Bellefonte:

- Magisterial District 49–1–01, Magisterial District Judge Donald Hahn
- Magisterial District 49–3–05, Magisterial District Judge Steven Lachman

== Education ==
=== Higher education ===
The Pennsylvania State University, founded in 1855 as Farmers' High School of Pennsylvania, is a public land-grant research university with campuses and facilities throughout the state, with its largest and main campus, University Park, being located in the borough of State College and College Township north of College Avenue.

The South Hills School of Business & Technology, founded in 1970, is a vocational school located in the Orchard Park neighborhood of State College.

=== Primary and secondary schools ===
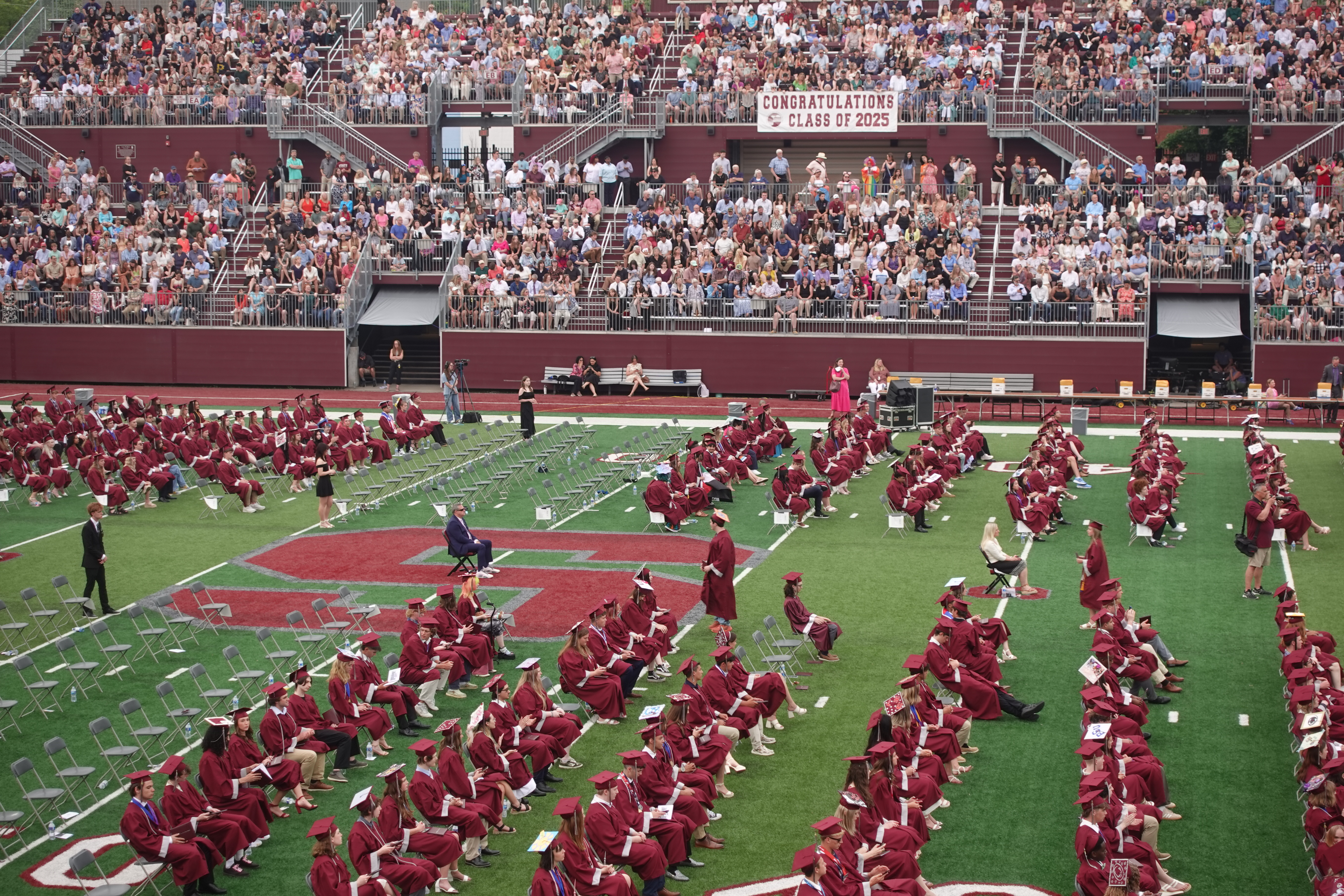
State High class of 2025 graduation at Memorial Field

The State College Area School District operates eight elementary schools, two middle schools, and one high school in and around State College, enrolling 6,712 students. The borough is home to three out of the eight elementary schools: Coral Street, Radio Park, and Easterly Parkway. Mount Nittany Middle School serves most of the borough except for College Heights, while the entire district is served by the State College Area High School.

The school district began in 1896 in the two-story Frazier Street school. In 1914 the State College High School opened in the Fairmount Building on Fraser Street. In 1957 high school students began moving into a new school on Westerly Parkway. In 1981 the Delta Program, a democratic charter school governed by students, moved into the Fairmount Building. In 2019 the Delta Program moved into the North Building on Westerly Parkway. The Fairmount Building now hosts the Reclaiming Individual Talent (RIT) program.

Penn State professor Amos Neyhart, began the first driver's education program in the United States at State High in 1933. Neyhart was driven to create the program after a drunk driver crashed into his parked car in 1931.

Aside from the Delta Program, State College is also home to other charter schools, such as Centre Learning Community Charter School, Nittany Valley Charter School, and Young Scholars of Central Pennsylvania. Private schools include Our Children's Center Montessori School, Our Lady of Victory Catholic School, and the State College Friends School.

== Media ==
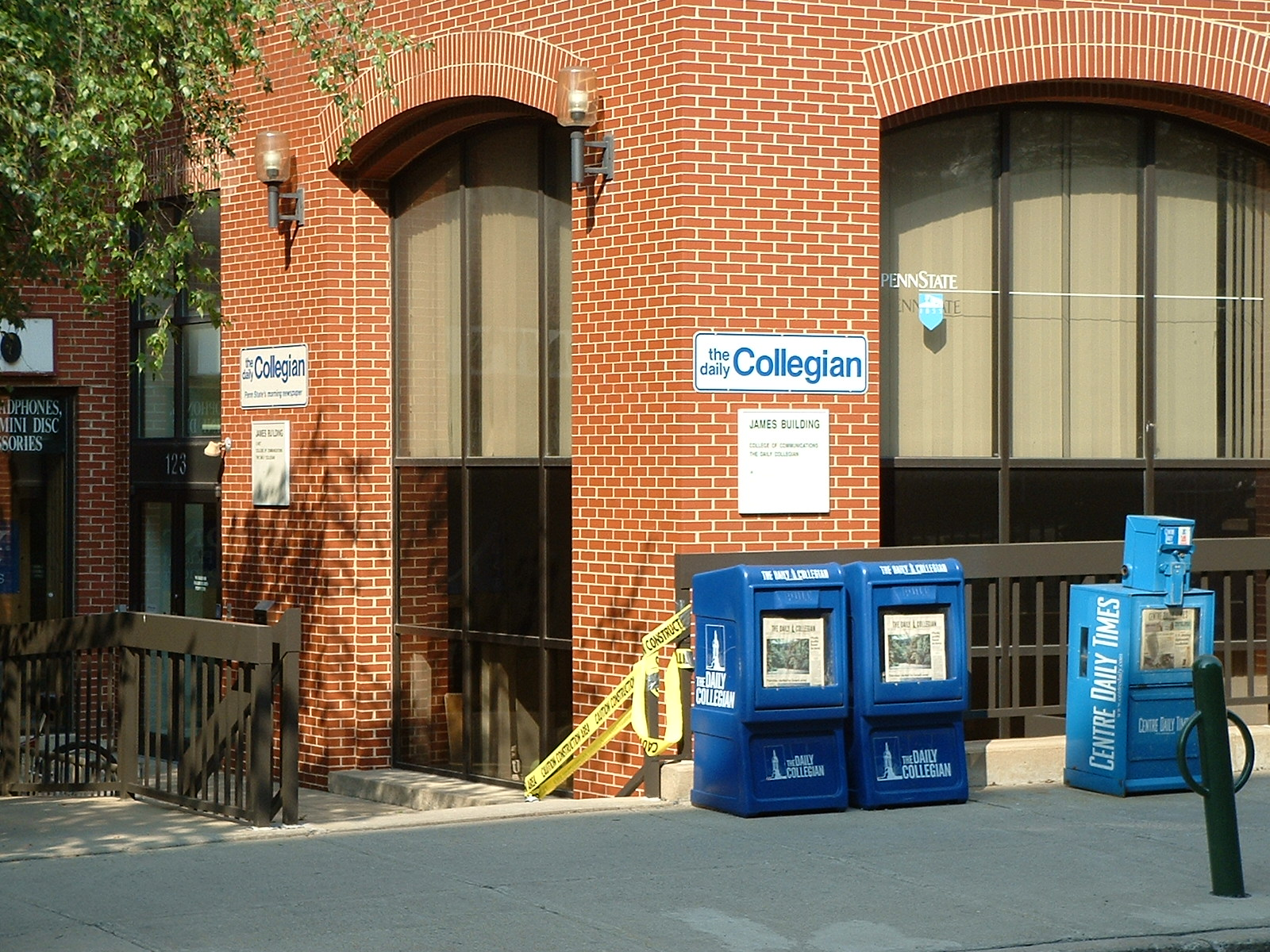
The previous home of the Daily Collegian at the James Building

State College's daily newspaper is Centre Daily Times, first published in 1898. Originally published under the name State College Times, the paper would change its name in 1932 to the Centre Daily Times. The Times is now part of the McClatchy Company newspaper chain. The paper had a daily circulation of 9,279, a Sunday circulation of 11,521, and over four million average monthly page views in 2020. There is also a weekly version published as Centre Weekly. Centre County Gazette is an alternative town newspaper. Newspapers of Pennsylvania State University's main campus include The Forum, the student-run Daily Collegian and Onward State is a student-run digital media blog.

Other publications include State College Magazine, a monthly regional magazine; Blue White Illustrated, a magazine for fans of the Penn State Nittany Lions; In The Belly, a quarterly abolitionist publication written by incarcerated contributors; Centered Magazine, a quarterly health and wellness publication; and Valley Magazine, a student-run quarterly life and style magazine; as well as Pennsylvania Business Central, and Town & Gown Magazine.

State College is part of the Johnstown/Altoona/State College television market, which is ranked as the 102nd largest in the nation as of 2016. Television stations broadcasting out of State College include WPSU 3 (PBS), WHVL-LD 29 (MyNetworkTV), and C-NET Centre County's government and education access television network, which broadcasts on two cable channels: CGTV (Government Access TV) on Comcast and Windstream Channel 7 and CETV (Educational Access TV) on Channel 98. WATM-TV 23 (ABC) produces a Centre County focused newscast, anchored from a studio on West College Avenue. WJAC-TV 6 (NBC), WTAJ-TV 10 (CBS), and WWCP-TV 8 (FOX) also maintain satellite studios and offices in State College.

== Infrastructure ==
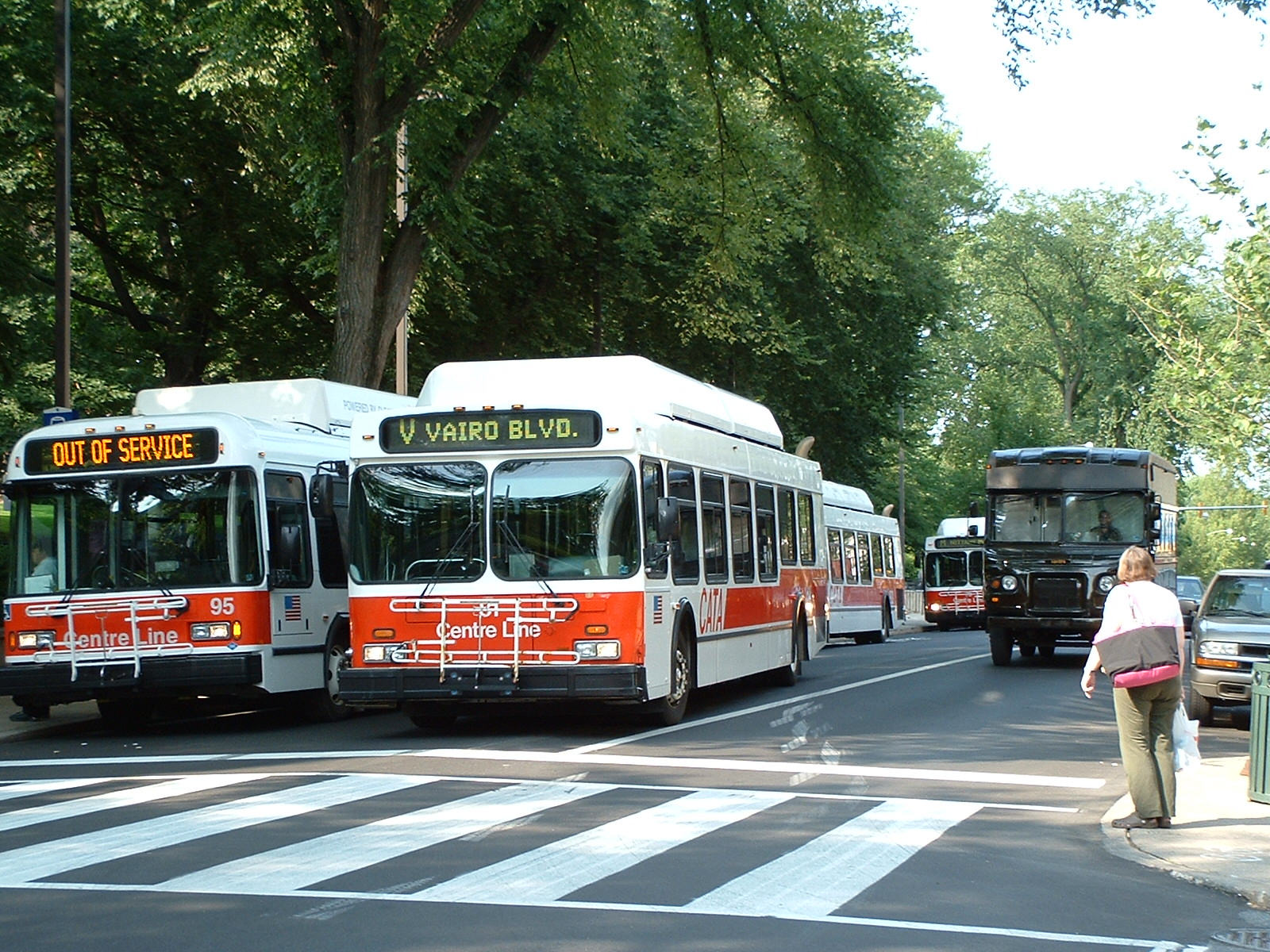
CATA buses on College Avenue by the Allen Street Gates

=== Transportation ===
In 2013, the State College MSA ranked as the fifteenth lowest in the United States for percentage of workers who commuted by private automobile (79.2 percent). During the same year, 9.9 percent of State College area commuters walked to work.

Initially, State College residents had to catch a stage coach to reach a train station in Lewistown or Spruce Creek to be connected to the Pennsylvania Railroad. In 1885, the Lewisburg and Tyrone Railroad opened a new station Lemont, two miles away from State College. The first train station in the borough opened In 1892, when the Bellefonte Central Railroad extended its tracks from Struble to State College. Four years later rail lines from State College were connected to Pine Grove Mills via Struble and Bloomsdorf. In 1930, the Fairbrook Branch was finished connecting State College to Fairbrook, Tyrone, and Altoona. That same year a new station was completed near present-day North Atherton Street to replace the earlier one on West College. The tracks were abandoned in 1974.

Later, the site of the old Bellefonte Central Railroad station on North Atherton would become a bus terminal for Greyhound Lines. Other inter-city bus services include Fullington Trailways and Megabus.

Centre Area Transportation Authority provides local bus service with fixed routes between the borough and the surrounding townships College, Ferguson, and Patton Township; and on-demand routes for Harris Township.

==== Cycle infrastructure ====
State College's cycling infrastructure includes bike lanes as well as a few shared-use paths. In 2021, the borough partnered with Spin to provide an e-bike service.

==== Roads ====
Highways include:

- U.S. Route 322 Business
- Pennsylvania Route 26

==== Airports ====
The borough is also served by State College Regional Airport with daily flights to Charlotte, Chicago, Philadelphia, and Washington onboard United Express and American Eagle.

=== Public safety ===
Alpha Fire Company, a volunteer service, covers State College and surrounding townships.

The State College Police Department patrols the borough as well as College and Harris Townships. Penn State operates its own police agency, covering University Park and 21 other campuses.

=== Utilities ===
Electricity in State College is provided by West Penn Power, a subsidiary of FirstEnergy. Natural gas service in the borough is provided by Columbia Gas of Pennsylvania, a division of NiSource. The State College Borough Water Authority provides water service to State College and Patton, Ferguson, college, Harris, and Benner townships. Sewer service in State College is provided by the University Area Joint Authority. Trash and recycling collection is provided by the borough's Public Works department.

=== Health care ===
Healthcare providers for the area include Mount Nittany Health, Geisinger, and Penn State Health. Mount Nittany Medical Center is a 260-bed hospital with an emergency department. Penn Highlands State College opened in 2024. Geisinger Healthplex State College is Geisinger's largest multi-specialty clinic. The primary ambulance service for State College is Centre Lifelink EMS, although Mount Nittany and Penn State both offer EMS as well.

== Notable people ==
The following individuals were born and/or raised in State College:

Sport figures:

- Blaise Alexander Jr. (1976–2001) – professional racecar driver
- Chris Bahr – former NFL placekicker and NASL soccer player
- Stan Belinda – former Major League Baseball pitcher
- Channing Crowder Jr. – former NFL linebacker, played six seasons with the Miami Dolphins
- Ron Dickerson Jr. – former head football coach at Gardner–Webb University, former NFL football player
- Larry Johnson Jr. – NFL running back, most recently played for the Miami Dolphins
- Rob Krimmel – Saint Francis University men's basketball head coach
- Butch Leitzinger – professional racecar driver
- Jordan Norwood – NFL wide receiver for the Denver Broncos, broke the super bowl record for longest punt return in 2016
- Barry Parkhill – former American Basketball Association shooting guard
- Bruce Parkhill – former men's basketball head coach
- Jay Paterno – author, former football coach
- Matt Rhule – football coach, currently head coach of the Nebraska Cornhuskers
- Jonathan Stupar – NFL tight end, most recently played for the Buffalo Bills
- Matt Suhey (1958–2026) – former NFL fullback, played ten seasons with the Chicago Bears
- Myles Thomas (1897–1963) – former Major League Baseball pitcher
- Guard Young – gymnast, three-time member of the U.S. gymnastics team

Others:

- Michael Anesko – literary critic, author, and professor
- Frank Peabody Atherton (1868–1911) – composer, music instructor
- Kerry Benninghoff – member of the Pennsylvania House of Representatives
- Joseph Bertolino - hip-hop artist, part of the duo Joey Valence & Brae
- Brian Blanchard – Judge of the Wisconsin Court of Appeals
- Galen Dreibelbis – real estate developer, former member of the Pennsylvania House of Representatives
- Ian Hendrickson-Smith – jazz saxophonist with Sharon Jones & the Dap-Kings and The Roots
- Si Kahn – singer-songwriter, political activist, founder of Grassroots Leadership
- Fraser Kershaw Jr. – activist and actor in Behind the Water
- Joshua Leonard – film actor, star of The Blair Witch Project and Madhouse
- Carol Mansell – television and film actress
- Caitlin Moeller – television and film actress
- Gretchen Morgenson – Pulitzer Prize-winning journalist for The New York Times
- Charles Myers (1913–2000) – former labor economist, author, and professor
- Rachika Nayar – musician
- Vance Packard (1914–1996) – former journalist, social critic, and author
- Kelly Perine – television actor and comedian
- Adam Ragusea – YouTuber who creates videos about food
- Arron Scott – dancer, member of the American Ballet Theatre corps de ballet
- Tom Shear – industrial/EBM musician, founder of Assemblage 23
- Doug Sweetland – animator for Pixar and Sony Pictures Animation
- John Taylor – lead guitarist and musical director for the Jonas Brothers
- Subramanyam Vedam – one of United States' longest serving exonerees
- Mary Louisa Willard (1898–1993) – former professor of chemistry at Penn State

The following were/are residents of State College:

Sport figures:

- Walter Bahr (1927–2018) – former professional soccer player, ASL and Penn State soccer coach; National Soccer Hall of Fame inductee
- Joe Bedenk (1897–1978) – former Penn State football and baseball head coach
- Pat Chambers – former Penn State men's basketball head coach
- George Daniel – champion fly fisherman, member of Fly Fishing TeamUSA
- Guy Gadowsky – Penn State men's hockey head coach, former IHL right wing hockey player
- David Kimball – former NFL and NFL Europe placekicker
- Jim O'Hora (1915–2005) – former football coach, associate professor at Penn State
- Joe Paterno (1926–2012) – former Penn State football head coach
- Russ Rose – Penn State volleyball coach and author
- Steve Suhey (1922–1977) – former NFL guard, played two seasons with the Pittsburgh Steelers

Others:

- Abhay Ashtekar – Professor of Physics at Penn State, noted for his contributions in general relativity and quantum gravity
- Rodney Erickson – former Penn State president
- A. William Hajjar (1917–2000) – former architect, designed several properties in the State College area
- Lloyd Huck (1922–2012) – former chairman of Merck & Co. and three-term Penn State trustees president
- Charleen Kinser (1934–2008) – toy designer
- Sarah Koenig – journalist, host and executive producer of the crime podcast Serial
- Thomas Larson (1928–2006) – former Federal Highway Administrator, Pennsylvania Secretary of Transportation, professor at Penn State
- Michael Mann – climatologist, geophysicist, director of the Earth System Science Center at Penn State
- James K. Morrow – science-fiction author
- Barry Myers – USCOA nominee, former CEO of AccuWeather
- Joel Myers – founder and executive chairman of AccuWeather
- Tawni O'Dell – novelist, author of Back Roads which was an Oprah's Book Club selection in 2000
- Sue Paterno – philanthropist, widow of Joe Paterno
- C. R. Rao – statistician and professor emeritus at Penn State
- Rustum Roy (1924–2010) – former professor at Penn State, founder of Materials Science Laboratory
- Henry Sahakian (1937–2021) – former businessman, founder of Uni-Mart
- Graham Spanier – former Penn State president
- James Vrentas (1936–2025) – chemical engineer
- Eric Walker (1910–1995) – former Penn State president
- Fred Waring (1900–1984) – former musician/bandleader and radio-television personality
- Bill Welch (1941–2009) – former mayor of State College

== See also ==
- List of college towns
