= Aaron Scott =

Aaron Scott may refer to:

- Aaron Scott (musician)
- Aaron Scott (footballer)
- Aaron Scott (basketball)

== See also ==
- Arron Scott, American ballet dancer
