= George M. Daniel =

American fly fisherman

George M. Daniel (born December 2, 1978) is a champion American fly fisherman. He is a member of Fly Fishing TEAMUSA, the U.S. national fly fishing team.

== Biography ==
He is a native of Loganton, Pennsylvania and grew up in the village of Germania, in Abbott Township, Pennsylvania. He graduated from Lock Haven University in 2001, with a degree in outdoor recreation management. He lives in State College, Pennsylvania with his wife, Amidea and their daughter, Evangeline. He works for TCO Fly Shop in State College.

== Fishing ==
Daniel is a member of Fly Fishing TEAMUSA, and a two time Fly Fishing U.S. National Champion. He has competed in four World Fly Fishing Championships, sponsored by Fédération Internationale de Peche Sportive Mouche (International Sport Flyfishing Federation). In 2006, competing in a field of 110 in the world championships held in Portugal, he finished in fifth place, the second best result ever by a competitor from North America. He also competed in the 2007 world championships in Finland, the 2008 world championships in New Zealand and the 2009 world championships in Scotland. Daniels lectures across the country on fly fishing, and his favorite technique, "dynamic nymphing". His book on dynamic nymphing was published in 2011.

In 2009, sportswriter Charlie Meyers of the Denver Post wrote that "a compelling case can be made for George Daniel as the best fly-fisherman in the country."
