= Uni-Mart =

American grocery store chain

Uni-Mart was a Pennsylvania-based company that owned, operated and franchised numerous convenience stores in the Mid-Atlantic region of the United States (US). In 2008, the company operated 283 convenience stores and gas stations in the US states of Pennsylvania, New York and Ohio, and, as of 1995, its annual sales totaled $327.01 million. Henry Sahakian was Uni-Mart's founder and, as of 1997, the company consisted of 2,700 employees.

On 29 May 2008, Uni-Marts LLC filed a voluntary Chapter 11 bankruptcy petition in the US bankruptcy court for the District of Delaware, initiating a process that had been considered by the company's management since September 2007.

In December 2009, the company's remaining assets were sold to Kwik Pik LLC, an affiliate of Lehigh Gas Corporation. As of 2016, many stations still operate under the Uni-Mart name.

== History ==
Henry D. Sahakian started the company in 1972. He opened the first Uni-Mart in State College, Pennsylvania in 1981, having rebranded stores from the Ma-jik Market franchise he had owned since the early 1970s. Uni-Mart quickly developed into a successful convenience store brand and by December 1986, Uni-Mart became a public company on the American Stock Exchange.

In September 1996, the company's 10,000 square foot Uni-Mart Center opened in State College and was promoted as "America's Largest Convenience Store Under One Roof." In addition to being a convenience store and gasoline station, the mega-center included a Burger King, a Manhattan Bagel, a Fox's Pizza Den, a Mail Boxes Etc., and a bank. In July 2004, Uni-Mart reverted to private company status following the creation of Green Valley Acquisition Co. LLC. By 2008, Uni-Mart owned and operated 283 stores in Pennsylvania, New York and Ohio, but the number of privately owned franchise locations was not clear.

In 2006 the company expanded into Ohio by acquiring a small number of BP stations in the Youngstown area adjacent to Pennsylvania, and eventually expanded into Cincinnati and Northern Kentucky as an exclave of its territorial reach. The company proceeded to convert and absorb the convenience stores into the Uni-Mart enterprise in 2007, but continued to sell BP gasoline (the majority of Uni-Mart stations in other areas sell their own brand of gasoline). Uni-Mart had sold other gasoline brands prior to this occasion, with a co-branding deal having been in place with Getty for most of the 1990s and several Pennsylvania stations offering Exxon and Sunoco gasoline until the bankruptcy in 2008.

The company was made private when Sahakian sold it to Non-resident Indian (NRI) Raj Vakharia, a former managing director of Donaldson, Lufkin & Jenrette. Vakharia will target its investment in high-growth markets throughout India including Delhi, Mumbai, Bangalore, Chennai, and Pune.

== Pirshlo ==
The Little Valley, New York-based Pirshlo, Inc. conglomerate, which owned the New York cluster of Uni-Marts (and a handful in northern Pennsylvania), was forced to shut down its entire cluster in August 2007, after Pirshlo owner Lloyd Long was convicted of tax evasion. Uni-Mart initially took over the Pirshlo stores before liquidating them, while the Seneca nation claimed two in Salamanca, one of which became WGWE.
