= Henry D. Sahakian =

American businessman (1937–2021)

- Born: February 4, 1937; Tabriz, Iran
- Died: February 23, 2021 (aged 84); State College, Pennsylvania, U.S.
- Education: Pennsylvania State University
- Occupations: businessman, founder of Uni-Mart
- Spouse: Seda

Henry D. Sahakian was the founder of Uni-Mart, which quickly became one of the largest convenience store and gasoline station chains in the United States. A Christian Armenian from Iran who moved to the United States in 1956, he studied mechanical engineering at Pennsylvania State University. There, he founded Unico, a builder of student housing projects.

The venture was a success, but Sahakian sought new challenges and, noting the rapid growth of Southland Corporation's 7-Eleven convenience stores throughout the region, flew to the chain's Dallas headquarters to personally petition for an exclusive territory of stores. When Southland offered him only a single store, Sahakian turned to Munford, Inc., the Atlanta-based owners of the Ma-jik Market convenience store chain, which granted him a 20-year license for convenience stores in the state of Pennsylvania.

Sahakian opened several Ma-jik Market stores in Central Pennsylvania in the early 1970s and by 1980 was operating 90 stores in the state. In 1981, he severed his relationship with the Maj-jik Market chain and rebranded his stores as Uni-Mart. His convenience store chain continued to rapidly expand in the Mid-Atlantic region and eventually grew to nearly 300 stores at its peak. Sahakian was also a licensed pilot and co-founded Sana Airlines, which later became Atlantic Airlines.

In addition to housing development, airline, and convenience store businesses, Sahakian and his family also owned various hotel, restaurant, and automotive oil change specialty shop franchises in the State College, Pennsylvania area.

== Philanthropy ==
Henry Sahakian, and his wife Seda, established the Henry D. Sahakian Family Fund to help offer financial support to various Centre County, Pennsylvania charitable organizations. Sahakian received the prestigious Oak Tree Award form the Centre Foundation for his philanthropic support and devoted leadership.
