= State Theatre (State College) =

Coordinates: 40.793634°N 77.862133°W

The State Theatre

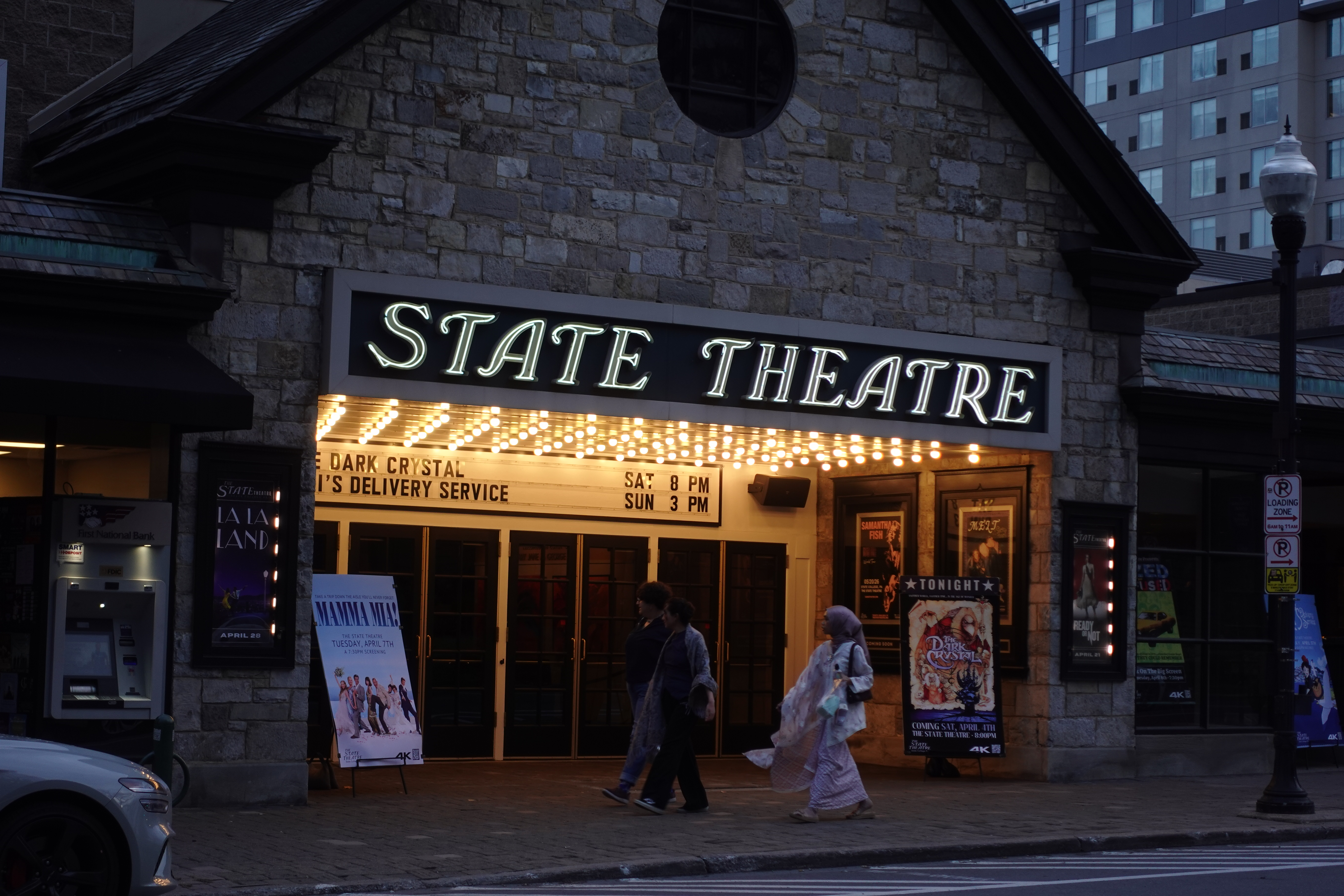
- Front entrance of the State Theatre
- Interactive map of The State Theatre
- Address: 130 West College Avenue; State College, Pennsylvania; United States
- Owner: The State Theatre, Inc.
- Operator: The State Theatre, Inc.
- Capacity: 554
- Current use: Community theatre (since 2006)

Construction
- Opened: October 15, 1938

Website
- www.thestatetheatre.org

The State Theatre is a 554-seat non-profit community theatre in State College, Pennsylvania. It currently operates as one of the cultural hubs of music, cinema, and live performances for downtown State College and the Centre County region.

== History ==
=== Movie theatre ===
The State was originally built as a movie theatre for Warner Bros. Pictures in 1938 at a cost of $70,000 (approximately $1,601,064 in today's dollars). It was described as a "beautiful and tasteful modern theatre presenting the finest pictures with the most advanced sound, projection and comfort." The first movie shown at the theatre was The Sisters starring Errol Flynn and Bette Davis. The State Theatre, also referred to for a period as The State Twin, continued to operate as a movie theatre until March 2001.

=== Community theatre ===
Shortly after its closure as a cinema, plans were in place to convert the property into a non-profit community theatre. Costs to cover the ambitious renovation, conversion and expansion goals would be raised through local fundraising efforts as well as corporate and government grants.

Once the necessary capital was received, the theatre building was extensively refurbished and reopened in December 2006 as a state-of-the-art venue for theatre, dance, music, film, concerts, and other regional and international performances. Some of the sold-out opening night guests of the "new" theatre included Pennsylvania Governor Ed Rendell, Pennsylvania State Senator Jake Corman, and State College Mayor Bill Welch.
