= KCF Technologies =

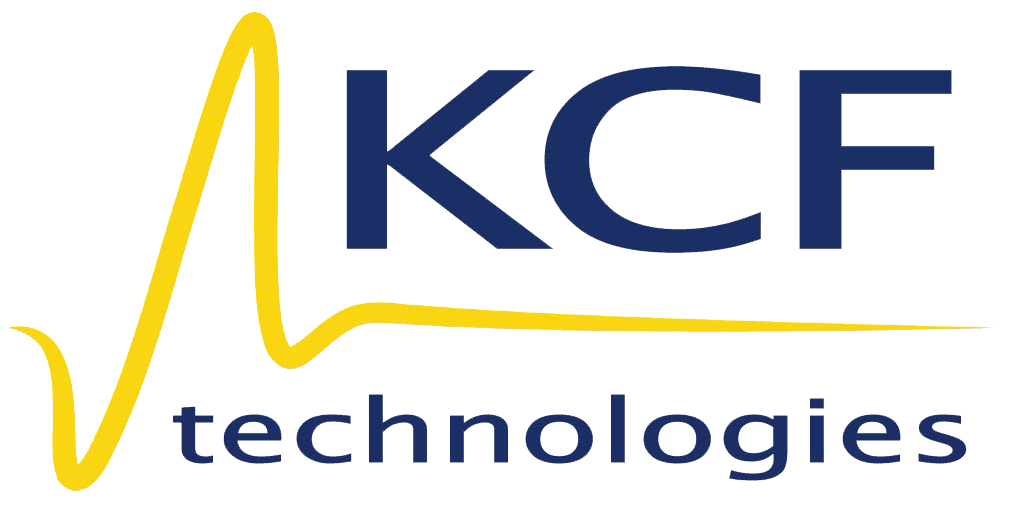
- Type: Private
- Industry: Applied Science
- Founded: 2000; 26 years ago
- Headquarters: State College, PA, United States
- Key people: Jeremy Frank, Ph.D, CEO, Co-Founder; Lou Romano, President
- Number of employees: 260 (2020)
- Website: www.kcftech.com/

KCF Technologies is a predictive maintenance solutions provider based out of State College, Pennsylvania that was founded in 2000. Their platform consists of three core pieces: SMARTdiagnostics cloud software, the SMARTsensing suite of hardware, and the SENTRYservices team of vibration analysts.

== History ==
KCF Technologies was founded by three Penn State researchers, Dr. Jeremy Frank, Dr. Weicheng Chen, and the Center for Acoustics founder, Dr. Gary Koopman. The company’s first projects included developing specialized sensing equipment for Black Hawk Helicopters, SMARTtether for underwater GPS, and prosthetics, among others. The company pivoted to their sole focus of predictive maintenance in the mid-2000’s, releasing their first vibration sensor specifically for industrial equipment and the first iteration of SMARTdiagnostics software.

== Products ==
KCF Technologies' predictive maintenance platform includes both software and hardware products. The company’s software platform, SMARTdiagnostics, includes Workbench, an analysis tool; Desk, an issue management system; and DeskAI, an AI-based fault detection tool. In 2023, KCF released the SD Connect mobile application for Apple and Android devices, extending SMARTdiagnostics functionality to mobile platforms. The application also supports FLIR cameras and, beginning in 2026, included a built-in motion amplification camera.

KCF’s hardware offerings are marketed as the SMARTsensing Suite, which includes proprietary hardware as well as integrations with third-party sensors.

KCF released its first wireless vibration sensor in 2010. The product has since undergone three major revisions, with the current generation introduced in 2018. The high-definition vibration sensor is a bi-axial vibration and temperature sensor designed for monitoring rotating industrial equipment.

The IoT HUB, introduced in 2021, is a multi-port device that supports wired sensors in high-temperature or shielded environments and allows integration of third-party, legacy, and OEM sensor types. The device supports both intermittent and continuous monitoring applications and can be triggered by PLC systems to capture data during specific operating conditions.

In 2024, KCF introduced Piezo Sensing, a sensing technology designed to detect low-level bearing impacts associated with early-stage equipment faults.

KCF Technologies added the SENTRYsolutions team in 2015. The group provides vibration analysis, root cause analysis, and condition monitoring support services for customers and includes analysts with CAT vibration certification.
