= Arron Scott =

American ballet dancer

- Born: Arron Scott; 1985 (age 40–41); Lewistown, Pennsylvania
- Education: Ballet Theatre of Central Pennsylvania, American Ballet Theatre, Pacific Northwest Ballet School and the School of American Ballet
- Known for: Ballet
- Awards: Rudolf Nureyev Scholarship

Arron Scott (born 1985) is an American ballet dancer and soloist with American Ballet Theatre (ABT).

== Biography ==
Arron Scott was born in Lewistown, Pennsylvania and raised in State College, Pennsylvania. Aged nine, he started his training at the Ballet Theatre of Central Pennsylvania and trained for two years at the School of American Ballet where he was awarded a Rudolf Nureyev Scholarship. He has danced on full scholarships at American Ballet Theatre, Pacific Northwest Ballet School and the School of American Ballet summer programs as well as being 2002-2003 ABT National Training Scholar.

The dancer joined ABT's Studio Company (formerly not of the JKO School) in September 2003. A year later, Scott joined American Ballet Theatre as a member of the corps de ballet. During his tenure with the company he has danced roles in VIII by Christopher Wheeldon. He was a Saracen Dancer in Raymonda. He performed the Neapolitan Dance in Swan Lake, played both Eros and a Goat in Sylvia, and had leading roles in Glow – Stop, Gong, and In the Upper Room. He also performed the "Cucurrucucú paloma" Duet from Milk Pool by Laura Gorenstein Miller. Arron Scott's roles with American Ballet Theatre include the Bronze Idol and Head Fakir in La Bayadere, Lead Fieldworker in Bright Stream, Lead Gypsy and Sancho Panza in Don Quixote, Njegus in The Merry Widow, Harlequin, Chinese, Russian and The Butler/Major Domo in the Nutcracker, Fairy Knight in The Sleeping Beauty, Mercutio in Romeo and Juliet, Tico in Company B, Ballet dancer in In the Upper Room, along with numerous corps, soloist and leading roles in the company's repertoire.

Arron Scott now teaches upper division and trainee students at the washington school of ballet.
