= Schlow Centre Region Library =

Coordinates: 40.7934°N 77.8598°W

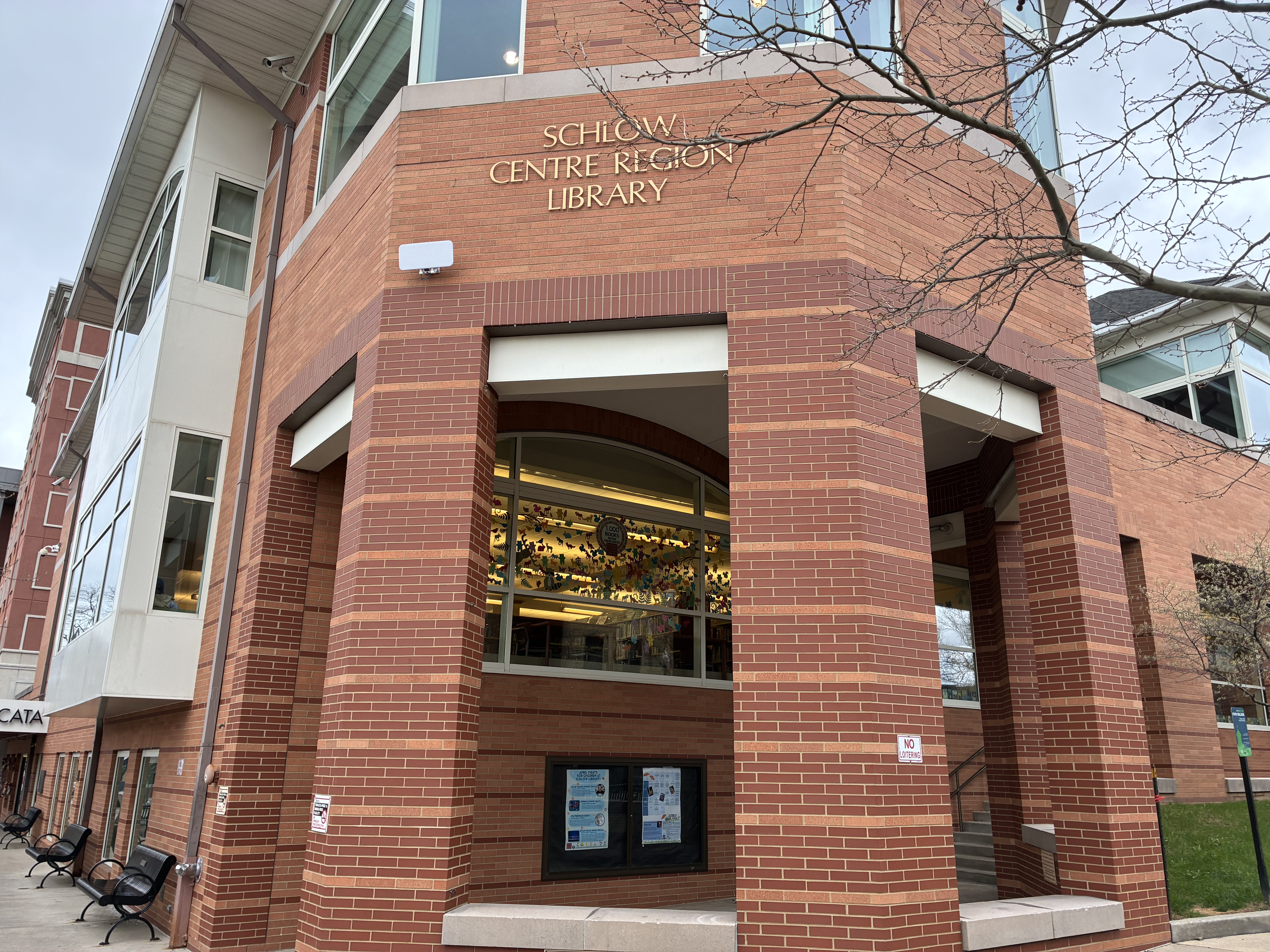
- Schlow Library
- Location: State College, Pennsylvania
- Established: 1957
- Service area: Centre County, Pennsylvania

Other information
- Website: http://schlowlibrary.org

The Schlow Centre Region Library, (Note: /skloʊ/) formerly known as the State College Public Library and the Schlow Memorial Library, is a public library located in State College, Pennsylvania. The library is part of the Central PA Library District, allowing patrons to make interlibrary loans to check out material from other public libraries in Centre, Clearfield, Juniata, and Mifflin Counties. It is also partnered with the Penn State University Libraries system.

== History ==
The library was named after local businessman, Charles Schlow, who in 1957 donated space in a West College Avenue house for the original library. The library quickly grew and moved to a new location on South Allen Street.

A new building opened in 2005, replacing the original. The new two-story 38,577-square-foot (3,583.9 m^{2}) building cost $10 million to construct. The public facilities include 66 computers. There were over 37,000 card holders when the new library opened in 2005. According to the 2005 Annual Report, Schlow had more than 291,000 visitors and 592,000 books in circulation.
