= Bill Welch =

American journalist (1941–2009)

Mayor of State College, Pennsylvania
- In office 1994–2009
- Succeeded by: Felicia Lewis

Personal details
- Born: November 23, 1941 Philadelphia, Pennsylvania
- Died: September 4, 2009 (aged 67) Hershey, Pennsylvania
- Education: Pennsylvania State University

William Lee Welch Jr. (November 23, 1941 – September 4, 2009) was a U.S. politician and former mayor of State College, Pennsylvania, most recently reelected in 2005. He had been the mayor since he was first elected in 1993, taking office in 1994, before which he was a member of the borough council. Mayor Welch died on September 4, 2009, at the Penn State Milton S. Hershey Medical Center in Hershey, Pennsylvania, after suffering complications from leg surgery. He was 67 years old.

Welch was born in Philadelphia, but spent most of his life in State College and is a graduate of State College High School in 1959 and of Penn State University in 1964. He formerly worked as editor of the Centre Daily Times newspaper for over 25 years and then of the American Philatelist, a magazine published by the American Philatelic Society.

As mayor, he annually welcomed first-year students at Penn State held at the new student Convocation and the Arts Festival, Welch also took part in Penn State's Homecoming activities, taught students about local government, met regularly with international students, gave tours of the State College Borough building and frequently attended building dedications and other events on campus such Take Back the Night, Veteran's Day ceremonies and celebrations honoring Martin Luther King Jr. — often giving remarks and providing history about town-gown relations. Welch also served as co-chairman of the Campus and Community Partnership United Against Dangerous Drinking, where he was involved in efforts to help curb dangerous drinking.

In the surrounding community of State College Borough and the Centre Region, Welch was known for his leadership within local and regional governments. Active in many local interest groups, he served on the board of Central Pennsylvania 4 July Inc. and the Discovery Children's Museum planning board.

"Bill Welch was one of Pennsylvania's greatest leaders," said Former Penn State President Graham Spanier. "He was a dedicated public servant and community leader. Bill was proud of his university and the town that surrounded and nourished it. The University and community were in turn proud of Bill, a great humanitarian and ambassador. Penn State deeply mourns his passing. "

A local community pool in State College is named after his father, William Welch Sr., a local doctor who led the fundraising effort in the 1960s to build the first community pool in State College. It is located next to State College Area High School on Westerly Parkway and was recently redeveloped in 2010 at a cost of US$5.2 million.

== Stamp collecting ==
An active and dedicated philatelist, Welch specialized in the postal history of Latin America and ship mail of Austria-Hungary. Welch was elected to the American Philatelic Society's Hall of Fame in 2010 for significant contributions to philately during his lifetime.

In his free time, Welch penned a monthly column for Town and Gown magazine with his wife, Nadine Kofman. He informally presided over weekly meetings of Young Writers of America, a group of community residents active in local affairs and writing, and he enjoyed rooting for the Super Bowl XL champion Pittsburgh Steelers.

== On the issue of same-sex marriage ==
Bill Welch presided over a same-sex commitment ceremony at Penn State University, and has stated that "It's not illegal or immoral".
