= Fly Fishing Team USA =

American fly fishing organization

Fly Fishing Team USA (abbreviated as FFTUSA) is a competitive fly fishing team representing the United States in national and international competitions such as the World Fly Fishing Championships. The team won its first international competition—the FIPS-Mouche Masters (over 50 division) World Fly Fishing Championship— in 2022. As of 2025, the team captain is Glade Gunther.
