= Sci-Fi Valley Con =

Annual convention held in Altoona, PA

Coordinates: 40°27′25″N 78°24′3″W

- Status: Active
- Genre: Multi-genre
- Venue: Blair County Convention Center
- Location: Altoona, Pennsylvania
- Country: United States
- Inaugurated: 2012
- Attendance: Nearly 4,000 in 2015
- Organizer: Assett Conventions LLC
- Website: scifivalleycon.com

Sci-Fi Valley Con (formerly Sci-Fi in the Valley Con) is an biannual three day multi-genre convention held during June and October/November at the Blair County Convention Center in Altoona, Pennsylvania. The conventions organizers also created Momento Con in Pittsburgh.

== Programming ==
The convention typically offers board gaming, charity auction, costume contest, film festival, guest panels, role-playing gaming, table-top gaming, trivia tournaments, vendors, video gaming, and workshops. The 2012 charity auction raised $1200 for The Machine Gun Preacher's Save the Children Foundation. 2013's charity auction benefited Shriners Hospitals for Children and raised almost $1500. The 2022 charity auction benefited the Children's Miracle Network.

== History ==
Sci-Fi in the Valley Con 2012 was moved from the Cambria County War Memorial Arena in Johnstown, Pennsylvania to the North Central Recreation Center in Ebensburg, Pennsylvania. This occurred due to a local fee that would affect the conventions dealers. In 2013, the convention moved to the Jaffa Shrine and used the bottom floor. It used both of the Jaffa's floors in 2014. The convention used half of the Blair County Convention Center in 2015, and the whole facility in 2016. Sci-Fi Valley Con 2020 was moved from June to August due to the COVID-19 pandemic, and later cancelled. Sci-Fi Valley Con 2021 was moved from June to October due to the COVID-19 pandemic. The October 2021 convention had lower than normal attendance. The June 2024 event had additional parking offsite.

Starting with the November 2024 event, Sci-Fi Valley Con expanded to two events per year. The convention banned AI art and Meta Glasses starting at the June 2026 event.

=== Event history ===
Dates	Location	Atten.	Guests
May 18–20, 2012	North Central Recreation Center; Ebensburg, Pennsylvania	1,000 (est.) or 1,200	Jeremy Ambler, Joshua Emerick, Chiara Fattorusso, Garrett Free, Jeremy McHugh, Mark Tierno, Tod Allen Smith, and April A. Taylor.
May 17–19, 2013	Jaffa Shrine; Altoona, Pennsylvania	2,000	Brian O'Halloran
June 27–29, 2014	Jaffa Shrine; Altoona, Pennsylvania	Almost 3,000	Rusty Gilligan, The Mandalorian Mercs, Robert Bruce, Brian O’Halloran, and Scott Schiaffo.
May 15–17, 2015	Blair County Convention Center; Altoona, Pennsylvania	Almost 4,000	Blair Murphy
June 10–12, 2016	Blair County Convention Center; Altoona, Pennsylvania		Brian O'Halloran, John Rhys-Davies, Zach Galligan, Alaina Huffman, John Morton, Alex Vincent, and Fred Williamson.
June 9–11, 2017	Blair County Convention Center; Altoona, Pennsylvania		Nicholas Brendon, Dameon Clarke, David Eddings, Donald Fullilove, Harry Waters, Jr., Jeffrey Weissman, Bob Gunton, Sam Jones, and Martin Klebba.
June 8–10, 2018	Blair County Convention Center; Altoona, Pennsylvania		Nicholas Brendon, Melissa Fahn, Richard Horvitz, Brian O'Halloran, Rob Paulsen, Rikki Simons, Tavisha Wolfgarth-Simons, Lee Arenberg, Olivia d'Abo, and Tracie Thoms.
June 7–9, 2019	Blair County Convention Center; Altoona, Pennsylvania		Rodger Bumpass, Seth Gilliam, Maurice LaMarche, Rob Paulsen, Billy West, Adam Fergus, David Haydn-Jones, Mark Pellegrino, David Lee Madison, and John Russo.
October 8-10, 2021	Blair County Convention Center; Altoona, Pennsylvania		Jim Cummings, Gigi Edgley, Olivia Hack, Sam J. Jones, Jennie Kwan, James "Brad Mick" McDonough, Michaela Jill Murphy, and Emily Swallow.
June 17-19, 2022	Blair County Convention Center; Altoona, Pennsylvania		Cam Clarke, Townsend Coleman, Grey DeLisle, Barry Gordon, Nolan North, Rob Paulsen, and Billy West.
June 9-11, 2023	Blair County Convention Center; Altoona, Pennsylvania		Carlos Alazraqui, Greg Baldwin, Dante Basco, Grey DeLisle, Jennie Kwan, Maurice LaMarche, Cricket Leigh, Michaela Jill Murphy, Rob Paulsen, Janet Varney, Kari Wahlgren, and Greg Sestero.
June 7-9, 2024	Blair County Convention Center; Altoona, Pennsylvania		Greg Baldwin, Roger Clark, Maurice LaMarche, Phil LaMarr, Nolan North, Steven Ogg, Maggie Robertson, Lauren Tom, Billy West, Rob Wiethoff, Shawn Fonteno, and Ned Luke.
November 8-10, 2024	Blair County Convention Center; Altoona, Pennsylvania		Ruth Connell, Bill Farmer, Jason Marsden, Colleen O'Shaughnessey, DJ Qualls, Mark Sheppard, Emily Swallow, Omri Katz, Dave B. Mitchell, Bradley Pierce, Vinessa Shaw, and Rick Worthy.
June 13-15, 2025	Blair County Convention Center; Altoona, Pennsylvania		Dante Basco, Barbara Dunkelman, Kara Eberle, Peter Facinelli, Maggie Grace, Lindsay Jones, Michael Vincent Jones, Kellan Lutz, Ross Marquand, Nolan North, Jackson Rathbone, Arryn Zech, Gil Birmingham, Julia Jones, Chaske Spencer, and Michael Welch.
October 17-19, 2025	Blair County Convention Center; Altoona, Pennsylvania		Roger Clark, Jason Marsden, DJ Qualls, and Rob Wiethoff.
June 12-14, 2026	Blair County Convention Center; Altoona, Pennsylvania		Peter Facinelli, Ashley Greene, Michael Ironside, Kellan Lutz, Dina Meyer, Bob Morley, Jackson Rathbone, Eliza Taylor, and Casper Van Dien.
October 16-18, 2026	Blair County Convention Center; Altoona, Pennsylvania		Judith Hoag, David Mazouz, Robin Lord Taylor, Kimberly J. Brown, Haley Fitzgerald, Malcolm Kelner, and Daniel Kountz.

== See also ==
- Setsucon
