= Comifuro =

Biannual dōjinshi convention in Indonesia

Coordinates: 6.300258°S 106.636604°E

Comic Frontier (Comifuro)

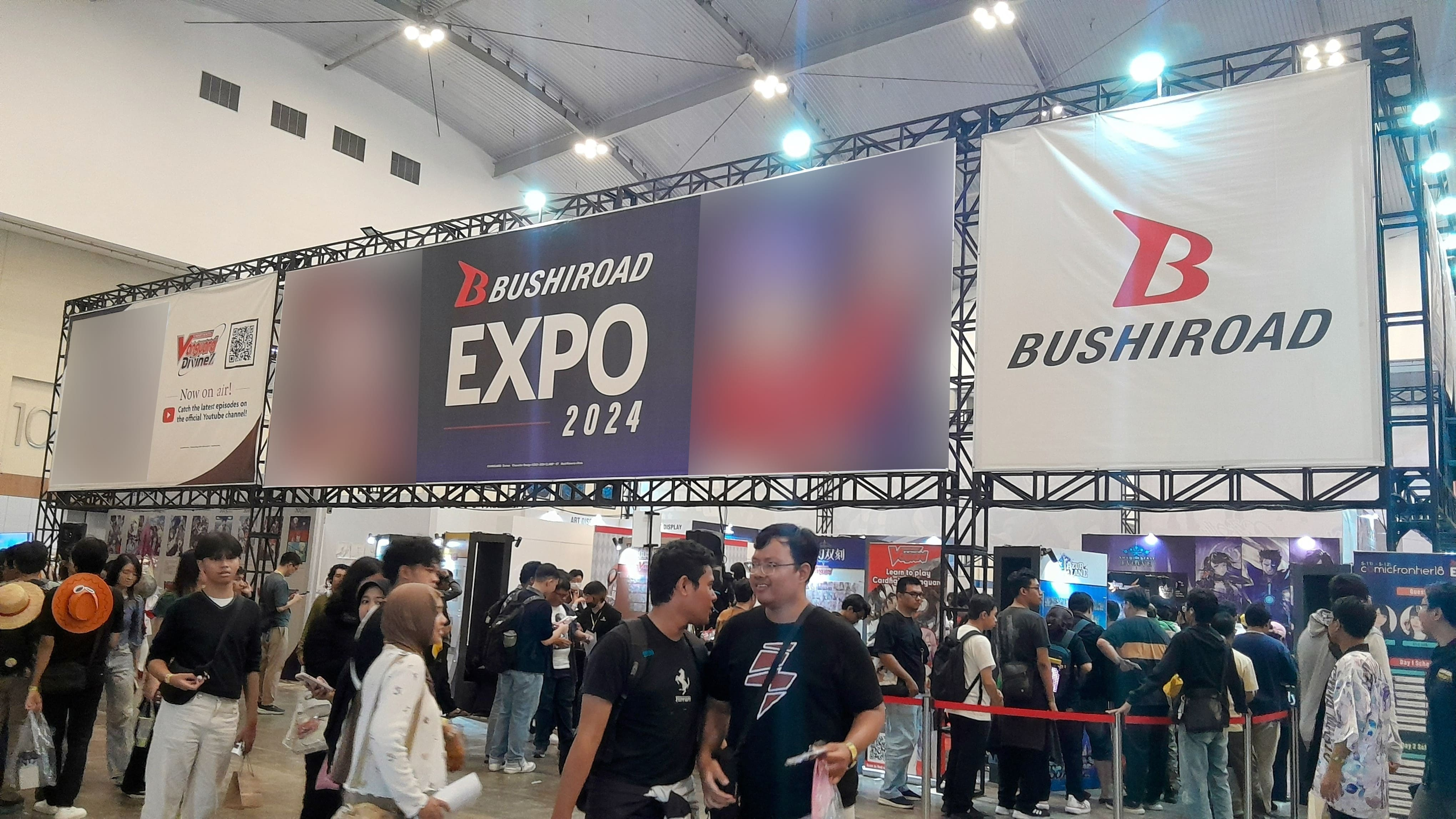
- Comifuro 18 (including Bushiroad EXPO) in 2024
- Status: Active
- Genre: Dōjinshi convention
- Frequency: Twice annually
- Venue: Indonesia Convention Exhibition
- Locations: BSD City, Pagedangan, Tangerang Regency
- Country: Indonesia
- Inaugurated: 15 July 2012
- Most recent: CF23, 31 October - November 1 2026
- Next event: CF24, 15-16 May 2027
- Attendance: Over 20,000 (CF15)
- Major events: Marketplace, industry floor, cosplay
- Website: comifuro.net

Comic Frontier, also widely known as Comifuro (unrelated to the Japanese manga service of the same name; abbreviated as CF), is a dōjinshi convention held biannually. It has a wide range of activities and participants, from the dōjin marketplace, cosplay show, corporate booth, music performance, and talkshow discussing creative industries (particularly comic and animation) in Indonesia. The convention has been influenced in design and spirit by the Japanese Comiket convention.

Since the 15th convention in 2022, Comifuro has been held at Indonesia Convention Exhibition in BSD City, Tangerang Regency, Banten, Indonesia.

== History ==
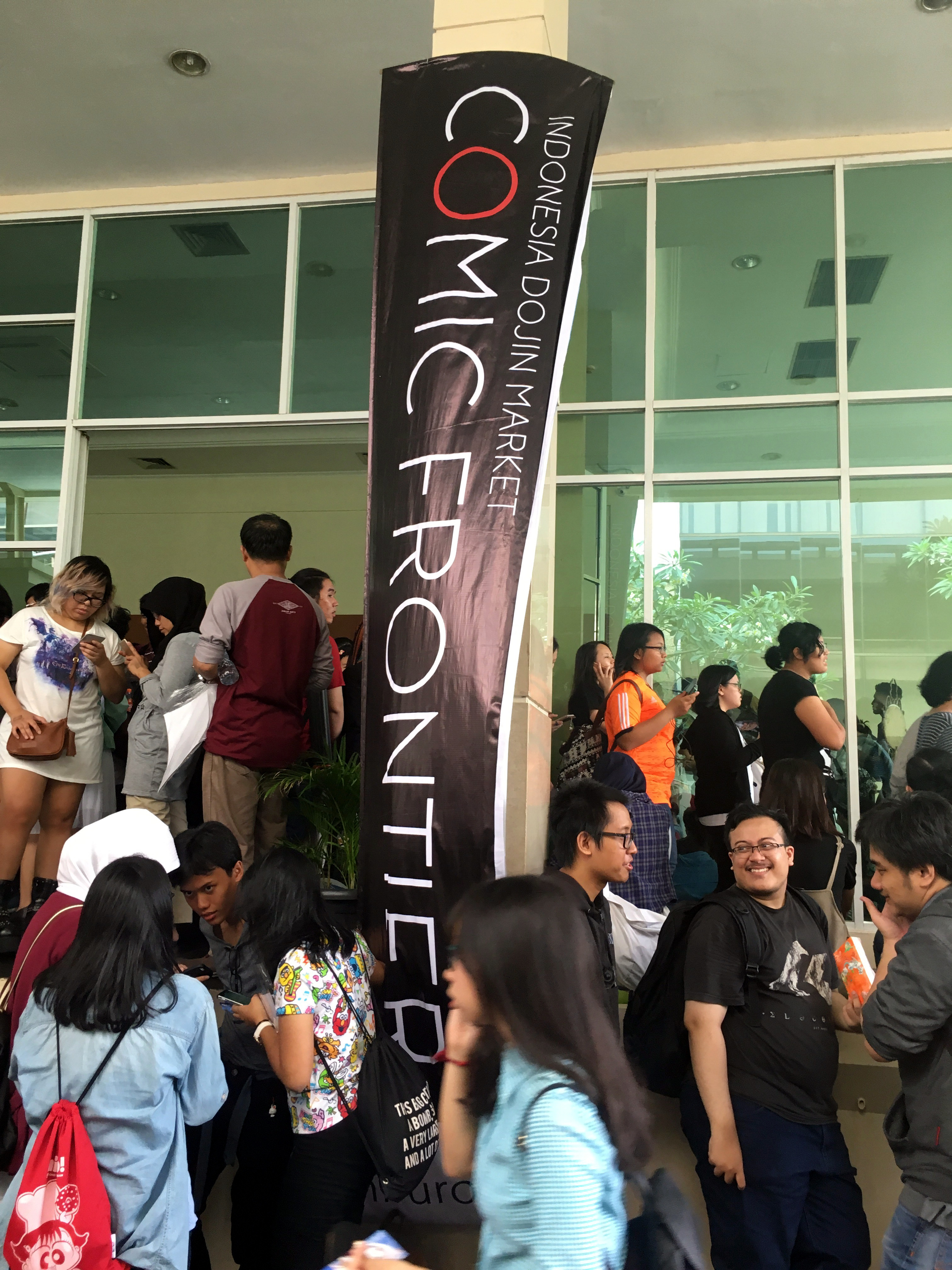
Comic Frontier 9 entrance

The convention was founded by several students from the University of Indonesia, with the first convention held in 2012. It was then called Comic Frontier Akipa x Gelar Jepang and 35 circles participated.

Originally a part of Gelar Jepang, a Japanese cultural event organised by Japanology Students' Association of the Faculty of Humanities of the University of Indonesia, Comifuro was spun-off as a standalone event since its third convention.

Comifuro is a member of the International Otaku Expo Association, a global association of expos and events that feature otaku culture.

== Profile ==
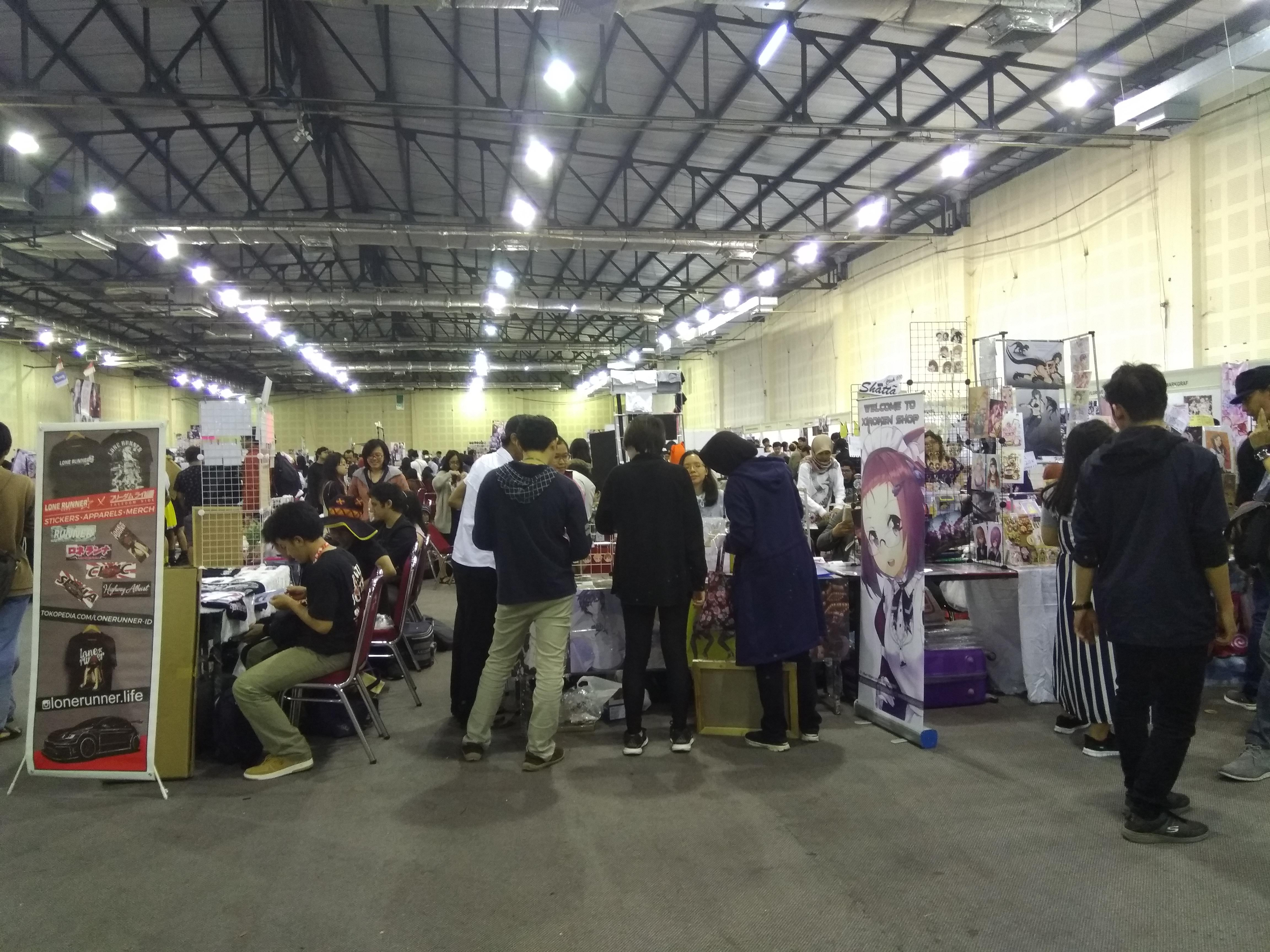
Circle booths during Comic Frontier 11

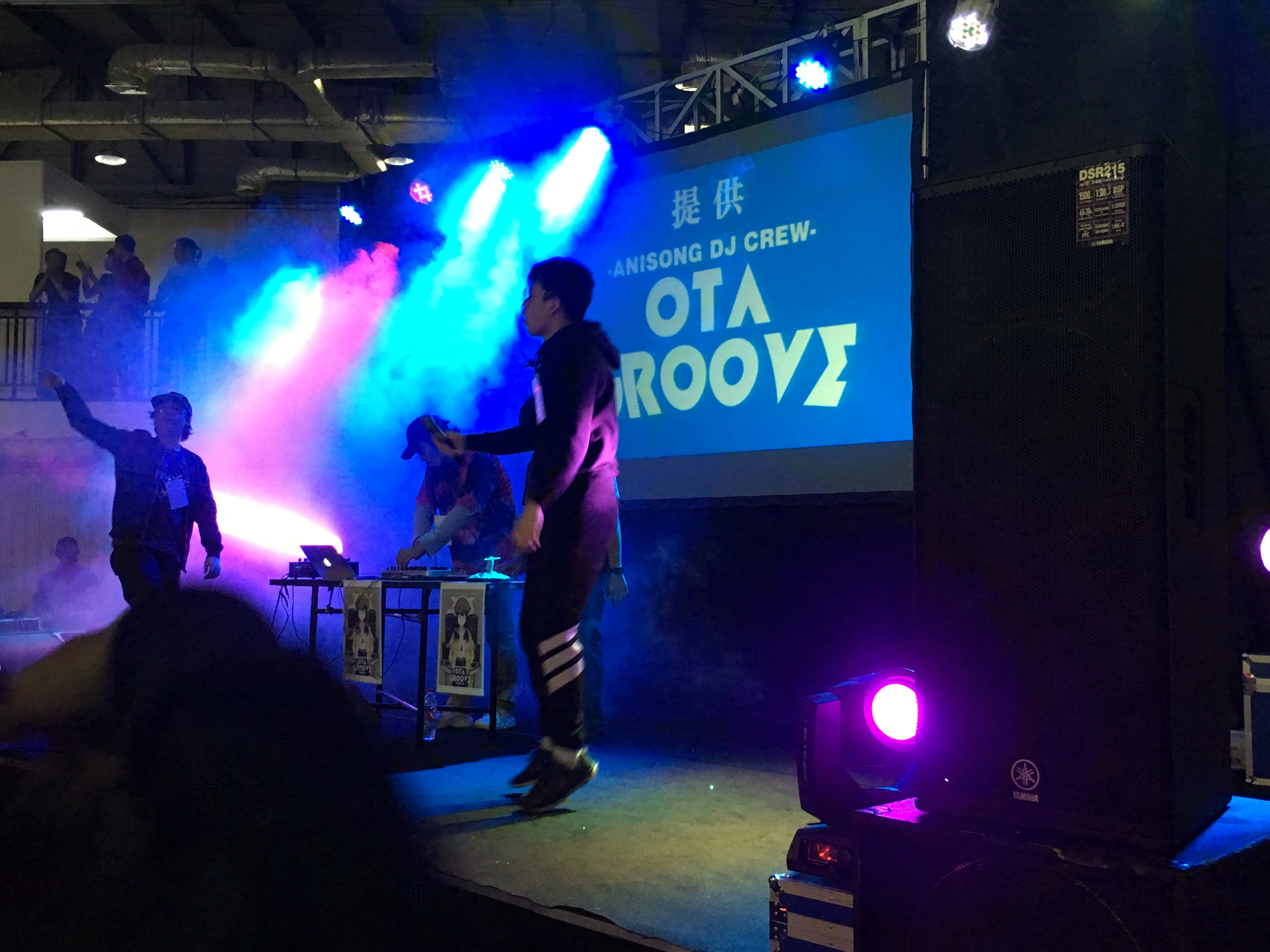
Closing performance by OTAGROOVE during Comic Frontier X

The dōjin marketplace is filled by circles of aspiring or established creators publishing their works independently, covering a wide range of fandoms from the east, west, or local IPs. The cosplay show is another mainstay of the event, with many cosplayers from Indonesia and abroad participating. Stage music performances are usually held during and at the climax of the event, consisting of karaoke sessions, music instrument performances, anison, and DJ performances.

Local comic publishers such as reON and CIAYO and the like would usually hold portfolio review sessions where aspiring writers and/or comic artists may submit their manuscripts.

Comifuro is typically held on Saturday and Sunday, bi-annually each year. Ticket sales began in the morning before the gate opens, traditionally at 9:30, with the ticket gate closing at 17:00. The dōjin marketplace and other activities are open until closing at 18:00.

In response to the COVID-19 outbreak in Indonesia, Comifuro held a new online format for the convention beginning from 2021, aptly named as Comic Frontier Virtual, or Comivuro for short (also often abbreviated as CV or CFV). The online format of the convention is a separate event series from its offline counterpart, with the 15th event reserved for an offline format.

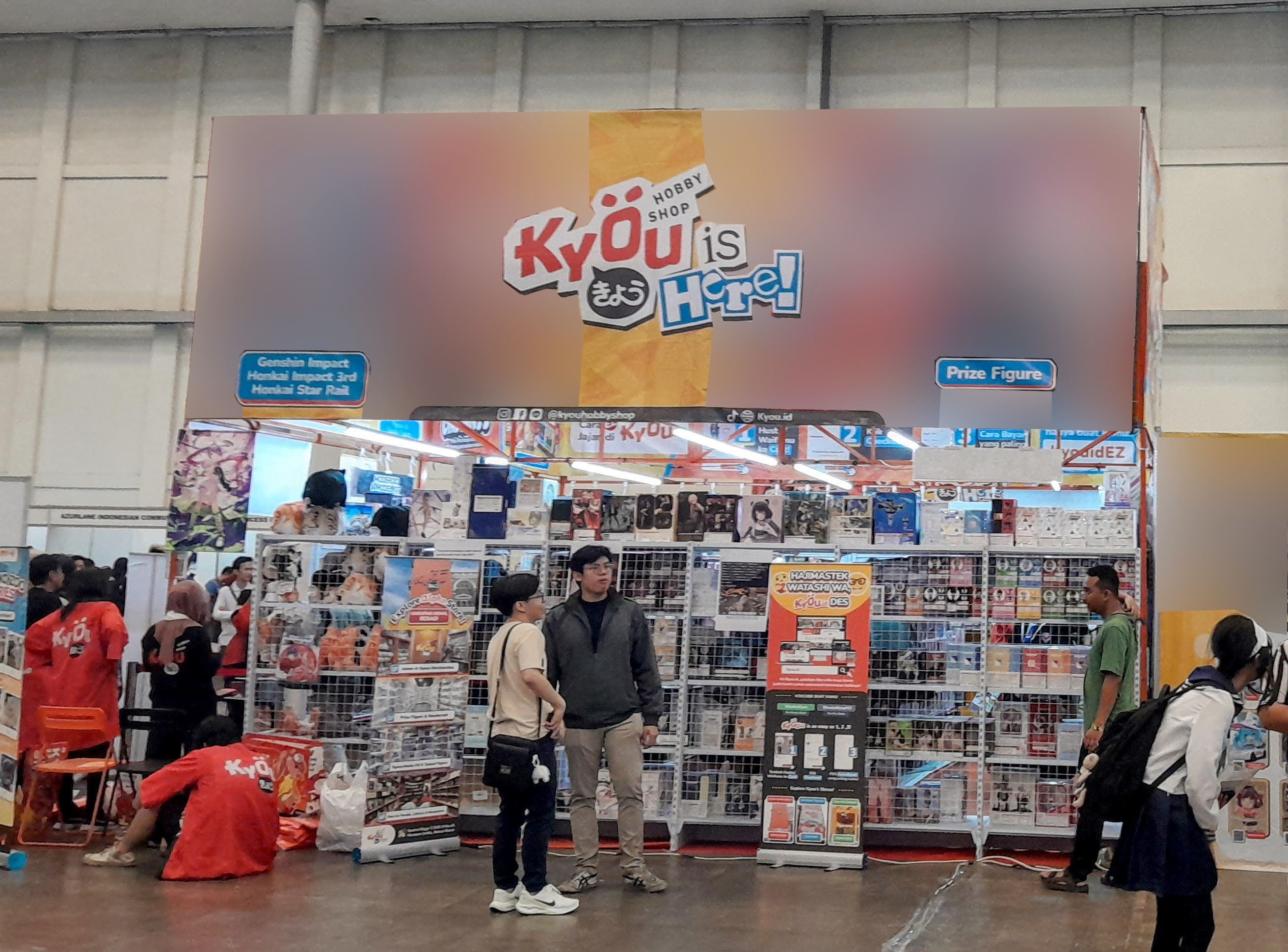
Hobby shops at Comic Frontier 18, these shops sell officially licensed products including those from Good Smile Company

For the first offline Comifuro since COVID-19, CF15, it was moved to hall 9 and 10 of ICE BSD where hall 9 was used as an eating place and hall 10 for the actual event. It attracted 17,000 visitors on the first day, crossing over 20,000 for both days combined. Because of this, many were queueing for hours to get a ticket with others were waiting since 3 am. It also was the first time Good Smile Company products being sold at Comifuro.

On 1 December 2022, Comic Frontier announced on their Twitter that Comifuro 16 would be held on 11-12 March 2023 in halls 8, 9 and 10 of ICE BSD. However, it has been postponed to 6-7 May 2023, citing security concerns surrounding the venue and its adjacent areas during the event date as cause of postponement.

Comifuro 23 banner on the entrance

== Events ==
List of Comifuro events
No.	Year	Date	Venue	Note	Attendance	Ref
1	2012	15 July	University of Indonesia (held as a part of Gelar Jepang)		1,500	
2	2013	7 July	University of Indonesia (held as a part of Gelar Jepang)		1,800	
3	2013	28–29 December	University of Indonesia (standalone event)	First standalone event and first two-day event.	2,500	
4	2014	6–7 September	Gelanggang Remaja, East Jakarta		3,700	
5	2015	24 January	SMESCO Exhibition Hall		4,500	
6	2015	22–23 August	SMESCO Exhibition Hall		5,300	
7	2016	30–31 July	SMESCO Exhibition Hall	First edition with entry ticketing.	6,500	
8	2017	21 January	Integrity Convention Center		9,200	
9	2017	2–3 September	Balai Kartini	Featured three international cosplayers: Aliga, Ying, and Nemesia.	Over 13,000	
10	2018	3–4 March	Balai Kartini	Announced and marketed as CFX.	14,000	
11	2018	18–19 August	Balai Kartini	Incorporated Shadowverse Indonesia Circuit E-Sports tournament.	15,000	
12	2019	23–24 February	Balai Kartini		17,600	
13	2019	7–8 September (Note: Originally scheduled on 10–11 August, but later rescheduled because of scheduling conflict with Eid Adha.)	Balai Kartini		20,500	
14	2020	22–23 February	Balai Kartini	First edition to use Rafflesia Grand Ballroom at Balai Kartini, resulting in expanded exhibition space.	25,000	
CV1	2021	17–18 July	Online	Comivuro (Comifuro Virtual) was held as a virtual event substitute with Comifuro 15 name reserved for future offline event.	Online 50,000	
CV2	2021	December	Online	The 2nd virtual event for Comifuro was announced at the end of the 1st Comivuro, named Comivuro 2.0: You Can (Not) Miss It.	Online 70,000	
15	2022	24–25 September	Indonesia Convention Exhibition	Comifuro 15 moved to ICE BSD, the largest convention centre in Indonesia.	40,000	
16	2023	6–7 May	Indonesia Convention Exhibition	CF 16 has been expanded to include Hall 8, 9 and 10 of ICE BSD.	42,000	
17	2023	16–17 December	Indonesia Convention Exhibition	Since this edition, committee added more shuttle service operated by Lorena.	50,000	
18	2024	11–12 May	Indonesia Convention Exhibition	A Bushiroad EXPO was included. Both days were opened in Japanese by Takaaki Kidani, Bushiroad's CEO and President.	45,000	
19	2024	9–10 November	Indonesia Convention Exhibition	Held simultaneously with the Indonesia Comic Con in the Jakarta Convention Center.	50,000	
20	2025	24–25 May	Indonesia Convention Exhibition	Announced and marketed as Comic Frontier XX. A Bushiroad EXPO was held again with Takaaki Kidani attending both days, hosting interpreted Q&A sessions both mornings of the event.	60,000	
21	2025	15–16 November	Indonesia Convention Exhibition	Collaborated with hololive Indonesia 5th Anniversary LIVE Chromatic Future	70,000	
22	2026	16–17 May	Indonesia Convention Exhibition			
23	2026	31 October - 1 November	Indonesia Convention Exhibition			
