= Cogecha =

Japanese illustrator (1995–2020)

- Cogecha at his "HELLO HELLO HELLO" solo exhibition, 2019
- Born: July 13, 1995; Saitama Prefecture, Japan
- Died: June 3, 2020 (aged 24); Japan

Cogecha (焦茶; July 13, 1995 – June 3, 2020; also spelt Kogecha) also known online as BARD713 was a Japanese illustrator from Saitama Prefecture, Japan. He was best known for his work with Japanese music producer Ayase.

He was also known for his work with Crypton, Hololive, and Aniplex.

== Early life ==
Cogecha was born on July 13, 1995, in Saitama Prefecture. He had experience in painting nihonga prior to his transition to digital illustration. His doujinshi started being published at Comiket within the circle "CGCh＝", then later at COMITIA.

His equipment was initially a Wacom Cintiq 13HD, which he bought with part-time income during his university days, later he upgraded to a Wacom Cintiq Pro 32.

== Death ==
Cogecha died from an undisclosed work accident on June 3, 2020, at the age of 24. It was publicly announced by his family on January 15, 2021.

On October 27, 2025, an art book titled "Reproduction: The Art of Cogecha" was posthumously released by Shōeisha with cooperation from his family, containing both released and unreleased artworks.

== Contributions ==
Client	Work	Role	Year	Ref
Crypton Future Media	"Snow Miku 2017"	Promotional Artist	2017	
Misumi	"Gentou" (幻燈)	MV Illustrator	2018	
Taro Tatsunoko	"Million Crown" (ミリオン・クラウン)	Cover Illustrator (Vol. 1–3)	2018	
ZLMS	"Sensitive Summer" (センシティブサマー)	MV Illustrator	2018	
KADOKAWA / Degenki Comics	"Fate/Grand Order: Dengeki Comic Anthology"	Cover Illustrator (Vol. 11)	2018	
Aniplex / Type-Moon	"Fate/Grand Order"	Illustrator for "Prayer for Winter" (冬の祈り)	2019	
Hololive Production	"AZKi"	2nd Iteration Outfit Designer	2019	
KADOKAWA (Kitora)	"Ano Natsu Boku wa Tenshi wo Mita" (あの夏ぼくは天使を見た)	Cover Illustrator	2019	
Ayase	"Ghost City Tokyo" (幽霊東京)	MV Illustrator	2019	
WEAKEND WALKER	"DREAM EATER"	MV Illustrator	2020	
WEAKEND WALKER	"Liar"	MV Illustrator	2020	
WEAKEND WALKER	"Kokuten" (黒点)	MV Illustrator	2020	

== Works ==
Art books
Title	Release year	Vendor	Ref
"PEOPLE ARE PEOPLE"	2017	Comiket 92	
"BLACK DOG"	2017	Comiket 93	
"SUPERSTITION"	2018	Comiket 94	
"DIE LORELEY"	2018	COMITIA 124	
"AUTOMNE MALADE"	2018	COMITIA 126	
"TAKE ON ME"	2018	Comiket 96	
"Traumerai"	2019	Comiket 96	
"HELLOHELLOHELLO"	2019	pixiv WAEN GALLERY	
"DIE A LONELY"	2019	Comiket 97	
"Reproduction: The Art of Cogecha"	2025	Various	
"Another Side Of Cogecha" (Another Side Of 焦茶)	2025	CGCh＝	

Exhibitions
Title	Date(s)	Venue	Ref
"HELLO HELLO HELLO"	June 14–July 3, 2019	pixiv WAEN GALLERY	
"Ichigo Ichie: Cogecha Taiwan Memorial Exhibition" (一期一會│焦茶台灣紀念展)	December 16, 2023 – January 14, 2024	d/art taipei	
"Reproduction"	October 31–November 5, 2025; November 7–November 10, 2025; January 30–February 8, 2026; March 27–March 31, 2026	Tokyu Plaza Harajuku "Harakado"; Shinsaibashi Gallery Building; GAAAT GALLERY FUKUOKA; RAYARD Hisaya-odori Park	
