= Chibi (style) =

Japanese anime art style with exaggerated proportions

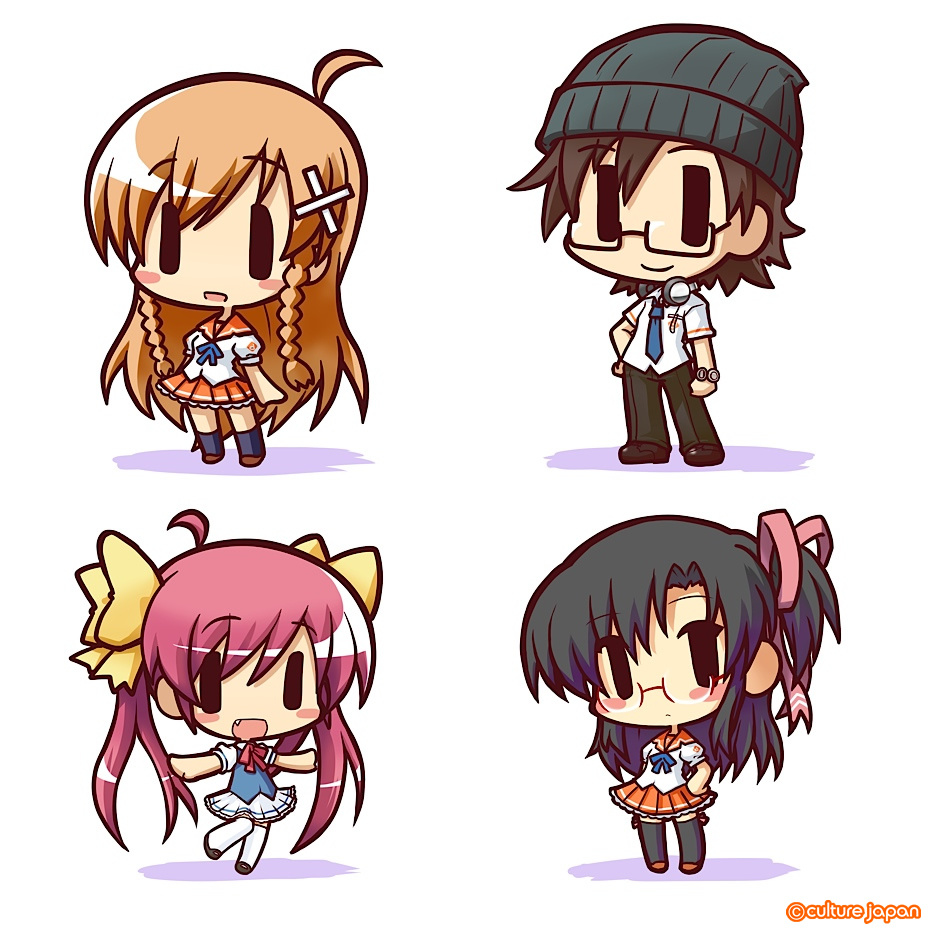
Chibi character illustrations by Danny Choo

Chibi, also known as super deformation (SD), is an art style originating in Japan, and common in anime and manga where characters are drawn in an exaggerated way, typically small and chubby with stubby limbs, oversized eyes, oversized heads, tiny noses, tiny bodies, and minimal detail. The style has found its way into the anime and manga fandom through its usage in manga works and merchandising.

== Word usage and etymology ==
The English term chibi derives from the Japanese chibi kyara (ちびキャラ, 'tiny character'), where chibi (ちび) is a colloquial word for very short people and children, itself deriving from chibiru (禿びる, v. 'to wear down'), and kyara (キャラ) is loaned from the English "character".

"Super deformed" and "S.D." come from Japanese deforume (デフォルメ, 'stylistic distortion'), itself from French déformer.

The terms super deformed and chibi are often used interchangeably as synonyms. However, a distinction is sometimes made between them: chibi may simply refer to a small character, even one without exaggerated proportions (such as Chibiusa from Sailor Moon), whereas super deformed refers to a style characterized by deliberately exaggerated proportions. This distinction is neither strict nor universally observed.

== Appearance and media usage ==
An example of a character being drawn with typical chibi proportions

Compared to the average anime character, usually about seven to eight heads tall, the head of a super-deformed character is normally anywhere between one third and one half the character's height. In addition to their modified proportions, super-deformed characters typically lack the detail of their normal counterparts. As a result, when a character of average proportions is depicted as a super-deformed character, certain aspects of their design will be simplified and others will be more exaggerated. Details such as folds on a jacket are ignored, and general shapes are favored. If a character has a signature characteristic (odd hair, a particular accessory, etc.) this will typically be prominent in the super deformed version of the character.

The chibi style easily falls under the Japanese category of kawaii, with the specific proportions being exaggerated in the ways that they are. With it being widely regarded as cute, the chibi style allows for easy advertisement in the culture, and even in other countries.

The chibi art style is part of the Japanese kawaii subculture.

Outside Japan, the super deformed style has also been used in American animation, including Teen Titans, where it was employed to exaggerate characters' emotional reactions; the Super Deformed Shorts produced for Avatar: The Last Airbender; and RWBY, in which characters occasionally assume chibi forms.

== See also ==
- Moe (slang), expression of fascination or infatuation
- SD Gundam, a Japanese franchise partially based on the SD concept
