= Setsucon =

Anime convention in Altoona, Pennsylvania

Coordinates: 40°27′25″N 78°24′3″W

- Status: Active
- Genre: Anime, Manga, Japanese culture
- Venue: Blair County Convention Center
- Location: Altoona, Pennsylvania
- Country: United States
- Inaugurated: 2007
- Attendance: 2,627 in 2026
- Organizer: Penn State Anime Organization (PSAO)
- Website: http://www.setsucon.com/

Setsucon is an annual three day anime convention held during January/February at the Blair County Convention Center in Altoona, Pennsylvania. The convention's name comes from the Japanese word setsu, meaning "snow". It is organized by the Penn State Anime Organization (PSAO). The convention is family-friendly.

== Programming ==
The convention typically offers an anime music video contest, anime showings, artist alley, card-game tournaments, dance, dealer's room, Iron Cosplay, Itasha car show, manga library, masquerade, musical events, panels, tabletop gaming, video gaming, and workshops. The 2008 host auction raised $1,200 and was donated to the United Way. Todd Haberkorn participated in the 2013 host auction, raising $510 for charity. The host auction in 2014 raised nearly $500 for Child's Play. Richard Epcar and Stephanie Sheh participated in the 2015 host auction, along with several cosplayers, raising $800 for Child's Play. Setsucon in 2018 had over 130 hours of convention programming. The 2022 charity video game tournaments benefited the National Alliance on Mental Illness. Charities the convention supported in 2023 were the Colon Cancer Coalition and Jared Box.

== History ==
Due to financial issues, the convention's first year in 2007 was reduced from three days to one day. In 2008, the convention expanded to two days due to additional funding. In 2010 on Saturday, Setsucon reached its venues capacity limit of 900 people before noon. The artists' alley and dealers' room were expanded in 2014. The dance was shut down early in 2015 because of complaints including poor behavior. In 2017, the convention showed never before seen clips from anime licensor Pied Piper, Inc. of the dub for Skip Beat!. In 2018, the convention moved to the Blair County Convention Center in Altoona, Pennsylvania.

Setsucon due to the COVID-19 pandemic was scheduled to move to April for 2021, and would also have Friday programming. Instead, Setsucon held a virtual event in April, and in 2022 returned to January with a three day event. The 2022 convention had COVID-19 protocols including masking and vaccination/testing requirements.

=== Event History ===
Dates	Location	Atten.	Guests
January 27, 2007	Days Inn State College; State College, Pennsylvania	288	
January 26-27, 2008	Days Inn State College; State College, Pennsylvania	555	D-Chan, Kyle Hebert, Dave Lister, and Chris "Kilika" Malone.
January 17-18, 2009	Days Inn State College; State College, Pennsylvania	599	Robert Axelrod, Dave Lister, Chris "Kilika" Malone, Yuko "Aido" Ota, Ananth Panagariya, and This Place is Haunted.
January 16-17, 2010	Days Inn State College; State College, Pennsylvania	1,058	M. Alice LeGrow, Chris "Kilika" Malone, and Vic Mignogna.
January 29-30, 2011	Penn Stater Conference Center Hotel; State College, Pennsylvania	1,057	Todd Haberkorn and Chris "Kilika" Malone.
January 28-29, 2012	Penn Stater Conference Center Hotel; State College, Pennsylvania	1,088	Antipode, Colleen Clinkenbeard, Kyle Hebert, Uncle Yo, and Greg Wicker.
January 26-27, 2013	Penn Stater Conference Center Hotel; State College, Pennsylvania	1,223	Antipode, Bea Billany, Todd Haberkorn, Cherami Leigh, Dave Lister, Uncle Yo, and DJ Zing.
January 25-26, 2014	Penn Stater Conference Center Hotel; State College, Pennsylvania	1,364	Antipode, Leah Clark, Richard Epcar, Todd Haberkorn, Kambrea Pratt, Thom Pratt, Ellyn Stern, Alexis Tipton, Uncle Yo, Greg Wicker, and DJ Zing.
January 24-25, 2015	Penn Stater Conference Center Hotel; State College, Pennsylvania	1,653	Antipode, Richard Epcar, Rusty Gilligan, Stephanie Sheh, Ellyn Stern, Uncle Yo, and DJ Zing.
January 30-31, 2016	Toftrees Golf Resort & Conference Center; State College, Pennsylvania	975	Antipode, Chris Bevins, DJ-R, Natalie Rose Hoover, Rachel Robinson, Uncle Yo, and DJ Zing.
January 21-22, 2017	Toftrees Golf Resort & Conference Center; State College, Pennsylvania	929	Antipode, Kira Buckland, DJ-R, Ralph "Ralfington" Edward, Erica Lindbeck, Keith Silverstein, and Uncle Yo.
January 27-28, 2018	Blair County Convention Center; Altoona, Pennsylvania	1,249	Antipode, Leah Clark, Amber Lee Connors, Daman Mills, Micah Solusod, Lex Winter, and DJ Zing.
January 26-27, 2019	Blair County Convention Center; Altoona, Pennsylvania	1,258	Antipode, Awesomus Prime, Brianna Knickerbocker, E. Jason Liebrecht, Elizabeth Maxwell, and Lex Winter.
January 25-26, 2020	Blair County Convention Center; Altoona, Pennsylvania	1,438	Antipode, Awesomus Prime, Kohei Hattori, Billy Kametz, Faye Mata, TiA, and Lex Winter.
April 10-11, 2021	Online convention		Antipode, Awesomus Prime, Heroes 4 Hire, Sarah Natochenny, and Lindsay Seidel.
January 28-30, 2022	Blair County Convention Center; Altoona, Pennsylvania	1,272	Antipode, Awesomus Prime, Heroes 4 Hire, Brittany Lauda, n00neimp0rtant, Otaku Ongaku, Matt Shipman, ThaGataNegrra, and Lex Winter.
January 13-15, 2023	Blair County Convention Center; Altoona, Pennsylvania	2,038	Antipode, Awesomus Prime, Aaron Dismuke, Kohei Hattori, Heroes 4 Hire, Sarah Wiedenheft, Lex Winter, and Fake Idol Project.
February 2-4, 2024	Blair County Convention Center; Altoona, Pennsylvania	2,380	Antipode, Chris Hackney, Heroes 4 Hire, ThaGataNegrra, Lex Winter, and Anne Yatco.
January 31 - February 2, 2025	Blair County Convention Center; Altoona, Pennsylvania	2,383	Antipode, SungWon Cho, Caitlin Glass, and Lex Winter.
January 30 - February 1, 2026	Blair County Convention Center; Altoona, Pennsylvania	2,627	Antipode, Awesomus Prime, Bill Butts, Ryan Colt Levy, Reagan Murdock, Uncle Yo, WildSpice, and Lex Winter.

== Setsucon Anime Autumn Alley ==
Setsucon Anime Autumn Alley is a one-day event held in October at the Hyatt Place State College in State College, Pennsylvania.

=== Event History ===
Dates	Location	Atten.	Guests
October 4, 2025	Hyatt Place State College; State College, Pennsylvania	562	
October 24, 2026	Hyatt Place State College; State College, Pennsylvania		

== Associations ==
Setsucon is a member of the International Otaku Expo Association (I.O.E.A).

Setsucon has sponsored a Costume Contest at Schlow Centre Region Library's BookFestPA event, run during the Central Pennsylvania Festival of the Arts.
