= Jaffa Shrine Center =

Multipurpose arena in Altoona, Pennsylvania

Coordinates: 40.50697°N 78.40975°W

- U.S. National Register of Historic Places

- Location within Pennsylvania Location within the United States
- Nearest city: Altoona, Pennsylvania
- Built: 1930
- NRHP reference No.: 100012143
- Added to NRHP: August 15, 2025

The Jaffa Shrine Center, formerly known as the Jaffa Mosque, is a 3,200-seat multipurpose arena located in downtown Altoona, Pennsylvania. The current Shrine Center, headquarters to the Jaffa Shriners, was built in 1930, opening on September 25 of that year. It was the largest convention center in Blair County until the Blair County Convention Center was built.

The Shrine Center building is a bilevel building measuring 216 feet (66 m) by 206 feet (63 m). Inside, the Shrine Center auditorium, located on the main level, can be used for boxing, wrestling, basketball, concerts, banquets, the circus, conventions, such as Sci-Fi Valley Con, and other events. It seats up to 4,000 for concerts, boxing and wrestling. The auditorium features an 80-foot (24 m)-by-30-foot (9.1 m) permanent stage and four offstage dressing and locker rooms. A mezzanine leads into the auditorium and features restrooms, checkrooms and two permanent concession stands, among other facilities.

There are two lounges, located on either side of the auditorium. The 22nd Street Lounge measures 1,541 square feet (143.2 m^{2}) and can hold up to 100, and the 23rd Street Lounge, which measures 1,127 square feet (104.7 m^{2}), holds to 70.

At ground level is a 25,320-square-foot (2,352 m^{2}) banquet room, which also hosts meetings and trade shows. It also features a state-of-the-art kitchen. A smaller meeting room (the Arabian Room) is also located at ground level.

The building was added to the National Register of Historic Places listings in Blair County, Pennsylvania on August 15, 2025.

== See also ==
- Shrine Auditorium and Expo Hall in Los Angeles, California
