= Jimmy Choo =

Malaysian-born fashion designer (born 1948)

Yang Berbahagia Datuk Jimmy Choo PJN DIMP DSPN OBE
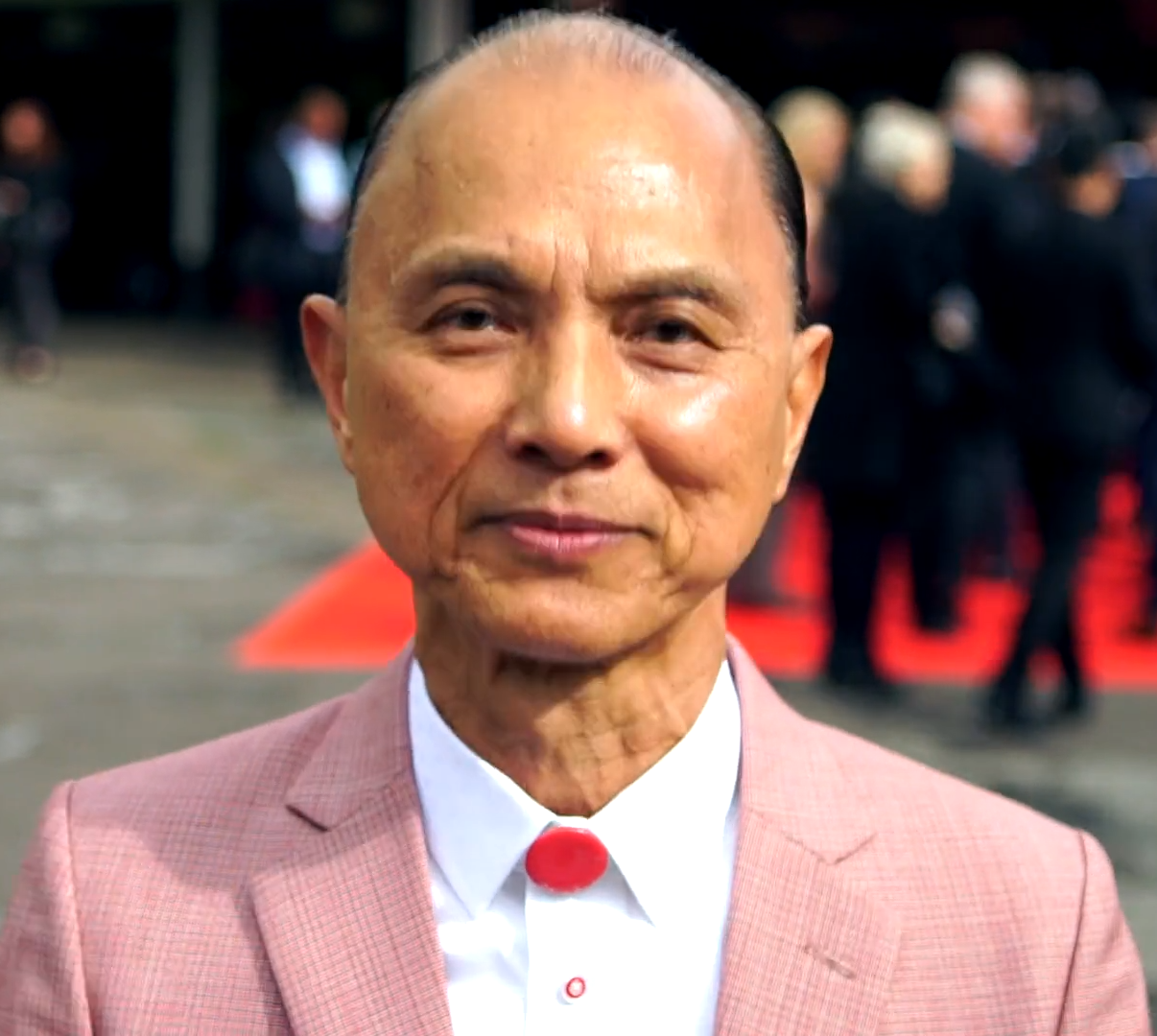
- Choo at the Red Dot Awards in 2016
- Born: Jimmy Choo Yeang Keat; 15 November 1948 (age 77); Bukit Mertajam, Crown Colony of Penang
- Education: Cordwainers Technical College
- Occupation: Fashion designer
- Spouse: Datin Rebecca Choi
- Children: 2, including Danny

Chinese name
- Traditional Chinese: 周仰傑
- Simplified Chinese: 周仰杰
Transcriptions
Standard Mandarin
- Hanyu Pinyin: Zhōu Yǎngjié
Yue: Cantonese
- Jyutping: Zau1 Joeng5 Git6
Southern Min
- Hokkien POJ: Chiu Gióng-kia̍t
- Tâi-lô: Tsiu Gióng-kia̍t

Jimmy Choo Yeang Keat (born 15 November 1948) is a Malaysian fashion designer based in the United Kingdom. He co-founded Jimmy Choo Ltd, which became known for its handmade women's shoes.

== Early life ==
Choo was born in 1948 in the Crown Colony of Penang (now part of Malaysia) into a family of shoemakers of Hakka Chinese descent. Choo's father, a shoemaker who made all of his shoes by hand, taught him the craft. "My parents were shoemakers and I have followed my father's lead. He inspired me," said Jimmy Choo. He made his first pair of shoes when he was 11 years old—a pair of slippers.

Between 1982 and 1984, Choo studied at Cordwainers Technical College in Hackney (now part of the London College of Fashion) in London. He went to a design firm to work after graduation, wishing to remain in London permanently instead of returning to Malaysia.

== Career ==
After college, Choo worked at two design companies for a total of nine years before starting his own business. Choo initially started with the help of the Prince's Trust. Choo's parents emigrated to Britain to help him get started, and he eventually expanded the business by opening his first shop in 1986, renting space in the old Metropolitan Hospital, Kingsland Road, N1. His craftsmanship and designs were soon noticed at London Fashion Week in 1988. After seeing his creations, Vogue featured his shoes in an eight page spread. Choo has said that his designs became significantly more popular after the Vogue coverage. Patronage from Princess Diana in the early 1990s further bolstered his image.

In 1996, Choo co-founded Jimmy Choo Ltd. with British Vogue magazine accessories editor Tamara Mellon. In April 2001, Choo sold his 50% stake in the company for £10 million. He has since concentrated his work on the exclusive Jimmy Choo couture line produced under license from Jimmy Choo Ltd. The Jimmy Choo London line, also known as Jimmy Choo Ready-To-Wear or, simply, Jimmy Choo, is under the purview of Tamara Mellon. The ready-to-wear line has expanded to include accessories such as handbags.

In 2009, Choo said that his brand was a favourite of Diana, Princess of Wales.

== Awards and honours ==
- 2002: Appointed an OBE (Officer of the Order of the British Empire) in recognition of his services to the shoe and fashion industry in the UK
- 2004: Awarded an honorary doctorate in art by De Montfort University, Leicester, UK, for his contribution to their unique Single Honours Footwear Design degree
- 2009: Awarded an Honorary Fellowship by University of the Arts London
- 2011: Winner of "The World's Outstanding Malaysian Designer 2011" Design for Asia Award for the "Daniel" part
- 2011: Winner of the "Outstanding Chinese Designer Award" for his accomplishments in the footwear industry.
- 2012: Received You Bring Charm to the World – the Most Influential Malaysian Award
- 2013: Became a member of the Red Dot product design

=== Honours of Malaysia ===
- Malaysia
  - Commander of the Order of Meritorious Service (PJN) – Datuk (2013)
- Pahang
  - Knight Companion of the Order of the Crown of Pahang (DIMP) – Dato' (1999)
- Penang
  - Officer of the Order of the Defender of State (DSPN) – Dato' (2004)

=== International honours ===
- United Kingdom
  - Officer of the Order of the British Empire (OBE) (2002)

== In Media ==
In 2023, Greek rap avant-garde artist Roi 6/12 released his album "Strip club" with the single "Jimmy Choo" which mentions the designer. The lyrics recite how wearing shoes designed by Jimmy Choo assists in the achievement of an extramarital affair between a male and a female.
