= International Otaku Expo Association =

Convention cooperative association

I.O.E.A
- International Otaku Expo Association
- 国際オタクイベント協会
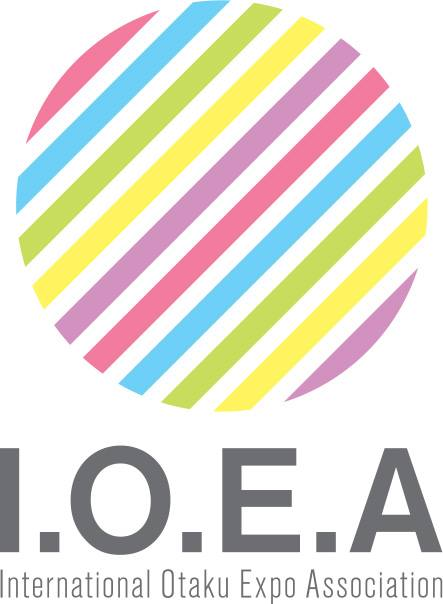
- Abbreviation: IOEA
- Formation: March 27, 2015; 11 years ago
- Headquarters: Akihabara, Tokyo, Japan
- Key people: Takamasa Sakurai; Kazutaka Sato; Dan Kanemitsu
- Website: https://ioea.info

The International Otaku Expo Association (IOEA), stylized as I.O.E.A, is an international cooperative association of otaku fan event organizers from around the world. The term otaku is used to indicate enthusiasm for Japanese pop culture and subculture surrounding anime, manga, games and fashion. The association does not limit membership to events that focus solely on Japanese culture. Any association that wishes to embrace otaku culture, whether it be Japanese or non-Japanese, is welcome to apply for membership with the IOEA.

As of July 2023 the IOEA currently has over 123 member events around the world, in 46 countries/regions in every continent except Antarctica.

== History ==
Fans of anime and manga have been networking with each other since the 1980s. Osamu Tezuka had visited the American fan organization Cartoon/Fantasy Organization in the 1980s.

Since at least 2007, Comic Market staff have been discussing about the many international visitors that have been attending Comic Market through the years which also included foreign press.

Discussions among numerous fan events for a cooperative association started prior to Comic Market's 2015 Comiket Special 6 Otaku Summit, an event that invited many otaku events from around the world. While numerous parties were involved in the creation of the IOEA. Takamasa Sakurai, Kazutaka Sato, and Dan Kanemitsu (Japanese Wikipedia Entry) were the original planning group.

The IOEA was formally established on March 27, 2015, during Comiket Special 6 Otaku Summit held in Makuhari Messe, Chiba.

=== Initial Signatory Events ===
During Comiket Special 6 a total of 30 events from around the world became the initial signatory events to help officially establish the IOEA. The first 8 events became the "Trustee Events" and serve as part of the Board of Trustees.

==== Initial Board of Trustee Events ====
- Animation-Comic-Game Hong Kong (Hong Kong)
- Anime Friends (Brazil)
- Comic Market (Japan)
- NicoNico Chokaigi (organized by NicoNico, Japan)
- Otakon (United States)
- Romics (Italy)
- Sakura-con (United States)
- Manga del Barcelona (Spain)

==== Signatory Events ====
- Anime Boston (United States)
- Anime North (Canada)
- Otakon (United States)
- Expo TNT (Mexico)
- J'Fest (Mexico)
- Lima Comics (Peru)
- Comics Barcelona (Spain)
- Aki Con (Russia)
- Ani Con (Russia)
- AniNite (Austria)
- Asia Breeze (Russia)
- DoKoMi (Germany)
- Fenix (Russia)
- JapAniManga (Switzerland)
- MinamiCon (United Kingdom)
- Nippon Nation (Austria)
- Siberia Otaku Saiten (Russia)
- Comic Fiesta (Malaysia)
- Fancy Frontier (Taiwan)
- Overload New Zealand (New Zealand)
- Thailand Comic Con (Thailand)
- Visual Arts Expo (Malaysia)

== Otaku Summit 2020 ==
Otaku Summit 2020 was an event that was part of the 2020 Tokyo Cultural Olympiad of the 2020 Tokyo Olympics that ran June 26–27, 2021. It was hosted at Sunshine City in Ikebukuro, considered as one of the major Otaku spots around Tokyo besides Akihabara, as part of Toshima City's cultural event for the Cultural Programme of the Olympics. The IOEA intended to host Otaku Summit 2020 on June 27–28, 2020 near the start of the Tokyo Olympics however due to the COVID-19 Global Pandemic the 2020 Tokyo Olympics were postponed to the following year and so was Otaku Summit.
