= Niigata Comic Market =

Comic convention in Niigata, Japan

- Status: Active
- Venue: Toki Messe
- Locations: Niigata, Niigata
- Country: Japan
- Inaugurated: 1983
- Website: http://gataket.com/

The Niigata Comic Market, also known as Gataket (ガタケット, Gataketto), is a dōjinshi comic book convention held bimonthly in Niigata, Niigata Prefecture, Japan. The convention venue alternates between Toki Messe and the Niigata City Sangyo Shinko Center, attracting a regular attendance of 7,000 to 10,000 people per event. It holds the distinction of being the largest dōjinshi comic book market on the west coast of Japan. The inaugural event took place in 1983.

== History ==
After establishing the Gataket secretariat in September 1982, the first Niigata Comic Market took place in January 1983. The inaugural event featured forty-six booths run by exhibitors and nine booths staffed by Gataket on behalf of exhibitors.

A significant milestone was reached on 14 November 1999, with the occurrence of Gataket50. Renowned radio actors Tomokazu Seki and Miki Nagasawa were invited to participate to commemorate the 50th Niigata Comic Market. Another milestone event, Gataket100, took place on 31 August 2008, which included appearances by esteemed radio actors Shūichi Ikeda and Tōru Furuya.

During the 2000s, the number of participating exhibitors has gradually decreased, and the frequency of Gatakets has increased. In 1999, the event reached its peak with approximately 2,000 directly-run exhibitor booths. However, by the 121st event in 2012, the number of exhibitors had dropped to 25% of the peak, falling to the minimum amount required to hold the event. To address this decline, organizer Fumihiko Sakata encouraged participation of experienced exhibitors and extended the deadline for applications, which allowed the event to be held. It has been suggested that the decrease in exhibitors may be attributed to the increased frequency of events, which made it challenging to maintain a sufficient number of participants.

== Related events ==
=== Gataket Special ===
Gataket section where cosplay is prohibited.

=== Cosplay Gataket ===
Gataket section exclusively for cosplay exhibitors.

=== Gataket in Nagaoka ===
Comic market held in Nagaoka City in Niigata Prefecture between January 1994 and October 2003. It was the Nagaoka version of Gataket.

=== Gataket & Okaket in Nagaoka ===
A joint comic market of Gataket and Okaket that was held between June 2002 and October 2010 in Nagaoka City in Niigata Prefecture. It was generally held at Hive Nagaoka and is in effect the successor to Gataket in Nagaoka. It was organized solely by the Gataket secretariat.

=== Niigata COMITIA ===
Niigata version of COMITIA under direction of the Gataket secretariat. It is held inside the Niigata City Sangyo Shinko Center twice a year. It was previously hosted at Toki Messe.

== Gataket shop ==
The Gataket secretariat managed a dōjinshi and painting materials shop in downtown Niigata. It closed in 2019.

== Niigata Manga Competition ==
The Niigata Manga Competition (にいがた漫画大賞, Niigata Manga Taishō) is a manga contest held annually in Niigata City every September. It is sponsored by the Niigata Manga Competition planning committee. It is jointly sponsored by the Niigata Comic Market, the city of Niigata, and the Japan Animation and Manga College, a local vocational school in Niigata city. The competition has been held every year since 1998. It is unique due to the rarity of its sponsorship: a local municipal government sponsors the manga competition.

== Related Pages ==
- Comiket
