= CIAYO Comics =

Indonesian webcomic platform

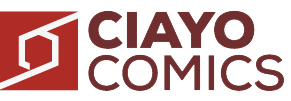
- Website type: Webcomic platform
- Available in: English; Indonesian; Taiwanese Mandarin (planned)
- Dissolved: July 30, 2020; 6 years ago
- Owner: CIAYO Corp
- Creator: Borton Liew
- Registration: Optional
- Launched: December 2016; 9 years ago
- Current status: Defunct

CIAYO Comics was an Indonesian webcomic platform. CIAYO Comics was created in December 2016 and is a subsidiary of CIAYO Corp.

== History ==
CIAYO Comics was founded in December 2016 by CIAYO Corp. It became the first national digital comic platform in Indonesia. CIAYO Corp also owns CIAYO Games and CIAYO Blog, as well as other businesses under the same brand. CIAYO Comics has a monthly readership of about 30 million people.

=== Collaborations ===
In 2018, BlackBerry Messenger and CIAYO Comics announced a partnership to launch comic services in BlackBerry Messenger for Indonesian users. With this collaboration, BlackBerry Messenger users in Indonesia can find comics on the BlackBerry Messenger home menu.

During the 2018 Asian Para Games, CIAYO comics released a comic about a disabled swimmer named Jendi Panggabean. The comic, titled Jendi, was illustrated by DS Studio and depicts the story of a real-life athlete of the same name who lost his leg at the age of 12 in a motorcycle accident and competed in the 2018 Asian Para Game.

In September 2018, CIAYO Comics published a comic adaptation of the film and novel Dilan 1990. The comic itself was written by the original author of Dilan 1990, Pidi Baiq.

== Shutdown ==
After more than 3 years of operating, CIAYO Comics announced the termination of its business operations on July 30, 2020. The CIAYO Comics website will still be accessible until the end of August 2020.
