= Danny Choo =

British entrepreneur and TV producer

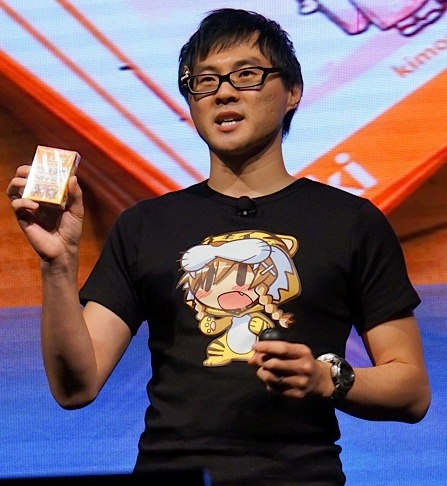
- Choo at the 2012 Comic Fiesta
- Born: 1 November 1972 (age 53); London
- Education: SOAS University of London
- Occupations: Blogger and entrepreneur
- Years active: 2004–present
- Father: Jimmy Choo

Danny Choo (simplified Chinese: 周国栋; traditional Chinese: 周國棟; pinyin: Zhōu Guódòng; Jyutping: Zau1 Gwok3 Dung3; Pe̍h-ōe-jī: Chiu Kok-tòng) is a British entrepreneur, blogger, and television producer based in Japan.

== Early life and education ==
Choo was born and raised in London, England. His father is Malaysian-born fashion designer Jimmy Choo. As his parents were often busy, he spent part of his childhood in foster care.

In his teens, Choo found a Japanese video game console, which caused him to become fascinated with Japanese pop culture. He taught himself Japanese in order to understand Japanese video games and manga. He graduated with a Bachelor of Arts (BA) in Japanese and Korean language from SOAS University of London. While he was in university, he worked at a Japanese restaurant, and he met his future wife there. He visited Japan for the first time in 1993 and moved there permanently in 1997.

== Career ==
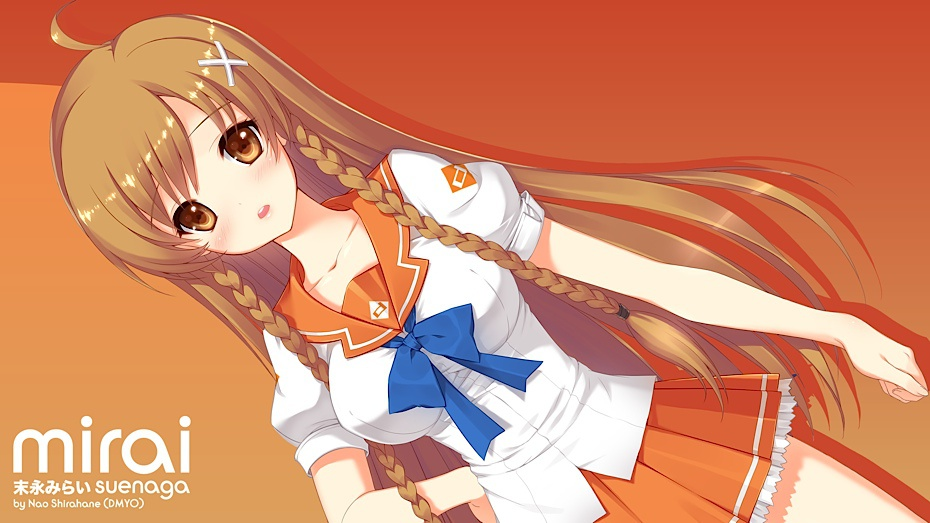
Mirai Suenaga, the mascot of Mirai Inc.

Choo founded the media company Mirai Inc. It focuses on sharing Japanese popular culture with a global audience through his website, television shows, products, and conferences. The mascot of Mirai Inc is a character called Mirai Suenaga, who first appeared in 2007. The character has made appearances in anime and other media. Mirai Suenaga also became an official mascot of Japan Tourism.

Choo is the producer, director, and presenter of a show called Culture Japan which airs throughout Asia on Animax. The show covers his life in Japan, and Choo says that his aim in the show is to act as a "bridge" for foreign audiences. The show discusses otaku culture and its aspects such as anime, manga, figurines and dolls, and video games.

Choo created a line of fashion dolls called Smart Dolls. He debuted the concept at Comic Fiesta 2013 and stated that the dolls would be robotic and be able to move autonomously, and that they would release in 2014. The robotic doll did not release in 2014, but a non-robotic "manual version" did, and proved popular. Versions of the doll have included room for internal USB hubs, power banks, and Bluetooth speakers.

== See also ==
- Fakku
