= COMITIA =

Doujinshi convention in Japan

COMITIA コミティア
- Status: Active
- Genre: Doujinshi convention
- Venue: Various
- Inaugurated: November 18, 1984; 41 years ago
- Participants: 3,000–7,000 circles
- Attendance: 30,000 (2024)
- Major events: Marketplace, original cosplay
- Organizer: COMITIA Organizational Committee; Other regional committees
- Website: comitia.co.jp

COMITIA (Japanese: コミティア, Hepburn: Komitia) is a doujinshi convention for original doujin (self-published) works held in various locations across Japan. COMITIA is typically held four times per year in Tokyo, and 2–3 times per year in Niigata (since 1991), Nagoya (since January 1993), and the Kansai region (since April 1993). Less regular events are also hosted in Sapporo (since 2014), Tōhoku (since 2015), and Kitakyushu (since 2017). As an event series focusing on non-derivative work, the sale of fan art, fanzines, fan fiction, and other parody material of existing copyrighted franchises is prohibited. It is the largest convention focused completely on original works in Japan.

Various high-profile manga artists, such as Keiichi Arawi, Kenshin Shinzato, and Barasui have previously exhibited at COMITIA.

== History ==
Since 1984, COMITIA has been hosted regularly by the COMITIA Organizational Committee, a not-for-profit volunteer organization. Events in Tokyo are referred to as Tokyo COMITIA while other cities feature conventions known as Regional COMITIA (地方コミティア, Chihō Komitia), which are organized by other volunteer-run groups. The Niigata event shares an organizational team with the Niigata Comic Market. Events in Kansai alternate between being held in Osaka and Kyoto, while the Michinoku event alternates between Sendai and Fukushima.

The COVID-19 pandemic resulted in the cancellation of multiple COMITIA events. A crowdfunding campaign was held in late 2020 and resulted in over ¥100 million (US$960,000) being raised to cover administrative expenses, venue fees, and the purchase of personal protective equipment for use during future events.

== Recent & upcoming conventions ==
| Type/Location | Number | Venue | Date |
|---|---|---|---|
| Kansai (Osaka) | 72 | INTEX Osaka | January 19, 2025 |
| Nagoya | 66 | Nagoya Trade & Industry Center | February 2, 2025 |
| Tokyo | 151 | Tokyo Big Sight | February 16, 2025 |
| Kansai (Osaka) | 73 | INTEX Osaka | May 25, 2025 |
| Tokyo | 152 | Tokyo Big Sight | June 1, 2025 |
| Niigata | 60 | Toki Messe | June 8, 2025 |
| Hokkaido | 21 | Sapporo Convention Center | June 15, 2025 |
| Michinoku (Sendai) | 14 | Yume Messe Miyagi | July 13, 2025 |
| Nagoya | 67 | Nagoya Trade & Industry Center | August 24, 2025 |
| Tokyo | 153 | Tokyo Big Sight | September 7, 2025 |
| Kansai (Kyoto) | 74 | Kyoto Pulse Plaza | October 19, 2025 |
| Hokkaido | 22 | Sapporo Convention Center | November 3, 2025 |
| Tokyo | 154 | Tokyo Big Sight | November 24, 2025 |
| Niigata | 61 | Niigata City Sangyo Shinko Center | November 30, 2025 |
| Michinoku (Fukushima) | 15 | Big Palette Fukushima | December 14, 2025 |
| Kansai (Osaka) | 75 | INTEX Osaka | January 25, 2026 |
| Tokyo | 155 | Tokyo Big Sight | February 22, 2026 |
| Nagoya | 68 | Nagoya Trade & Industry Center | March 22, 2026 |
| Tokyo | 156 | Tokyo Big Sight | June 7, 2026 |

=== Past conventions ===
| Type/Location | Number | Venue | Date |
|---|---|---|---|
| Kansai (Osaka) | 63 | INTEX Osaka | January 23, 2022 |
| Tokyo | 139 | Tokyo Big Sight | February 20, 2022 |
| Nagoya | 60 | Nagoya Congress Center | April 3, 2022 |
| Tokyo | 140 | Tokyo Big Sight | May 5, 2022 |
| Kansai (Osaka) | 64 | INTEX Osaka | May 22, 2022 |
| Niigata | 54 | Niigata City Sangyo Shinko Center | May 29, 2022 |
| Hokkaido | 15 | Sapporo Convention Center | June 5, 2022 |
| Michinoku (Sendai) | 8 | Yume Messe Miyagi | June 12, 2022 |
| Tokyo | 141 | Tokyo Big Sight | September 4, 2022 |
| Kansai (Kyoto) | 65 | Kyoto Pulse Plaza | September 19, 2022 |
| Nagoya | 61 | Nagoya Congress Center | October 2, 2022 |
| Kyushu | 6 | West Japan General Exhibition Center | October 10, 2022 |
| Niigata | 55 | Niigata City Sangyo Shinko Center | November 20, 2022 |
| Tokyo | 142 | Tokyo Big Sight | November 27, 2022 |
| Hokkaido | 16 | Sapporo Convention Center | December 3, 2022 |
| Michinoku (Fukushima) | 9 | Big Palette Fukushima | December 11, 2022 |
| Kansai (Kyoto) | 66 | Kyoto Pulse Plaza | January 22, 2023 |
| Tokyo | 143 | Tokyo Big Sight | February 19, 2023 |
| Kyushu | 7 | West Japan General Exhibition Center | March 5, 2023 |
| Nagoya | 62 | Nagoya Congress Center | March 26, 2023 |
| Tokyo | 144 | Tokyo Big Sight | May 5, 2023 |
| Kansai (Osaka) | 67 | INTEX Osaka | May 21, 2023 |
| Michinoku (Sendai) | 10 | Yume Messe Miyagi | May 27, 2023 |
| Hokkaido | 17 | Sapporo Convention Center | June 25, 2023 |
| Niigata | 56 | Niigata City Sangyo Shinko Center | July 2, 2023 |
| Tokyo | 145 | Tokyo Big Sight | September 3, 2023 |
| Nagoya | 63 | Nagoya Congress Center | September 17, 2023 |
| Kansai (Kyoto) | 68 | Kyoto Pulse Plaza | October 22, 2023 |
| Niigata | 57 | Niigata City Sangyo Shinko Center | October 29, 2023 |
| Michinoku (Fukushima) | 11 | Big Palette Fukushima | November 4, 2023 |
| Hokkaido | 18 | Sapporo Convention Center | November 5, 2023 |
| Kansai (Osaka) | 69 | INTEX Osaka | January 21, 2024 |
| Tokyo | 147 | Tokyo Big Sight | February 25, 2024 |
| Kyushu | 8 | West Japan General Exhibition Center | March 10, 2024 |
| Nagoya | 64 | Nagoya Congress Center | March 24, 2024 |
| Kansai (Osaka) | 70 | INTEX Osaka | May 12, 2024 |
| Tokyo | 148 | Tokyo Big Sight | May 26, 2024 |
| Niigata | 58 | Toki Messe | June 9, 2024 |
| Hokkaido | 19 | Sapporo Convention Center | June 23, 2024 |
| Michinoku (Sendai) | 12 | Yume Messe Miyagi | June 30, 2024 |
| Tokyo | 149 | Tokyo Big Sight | August 18, 2024 |
| Nagoya | 65 | Nagoya Congress Center | September 29, 2024 |
| Hokkaido | 20 | Sapporo Convention Center | October 27, 2024 |
| Kansai (Osaka) | 71 | Mydome Osaka | November 10, 2024 |
| Tokyo | 150 | Tokyo Big Sight | November 17, 2024 |
| Niigata | 59 | Niigata City Sangyo Shinko Center | December 1, 2024 |
| Michinoku (Fukushima) | 13 | Big Palette Fukushima | December 8, 2024 |
