= Takamasa Sakurai =

Japanese pop culture and anime expert (1965–2015)

- 櫻井 孝昌
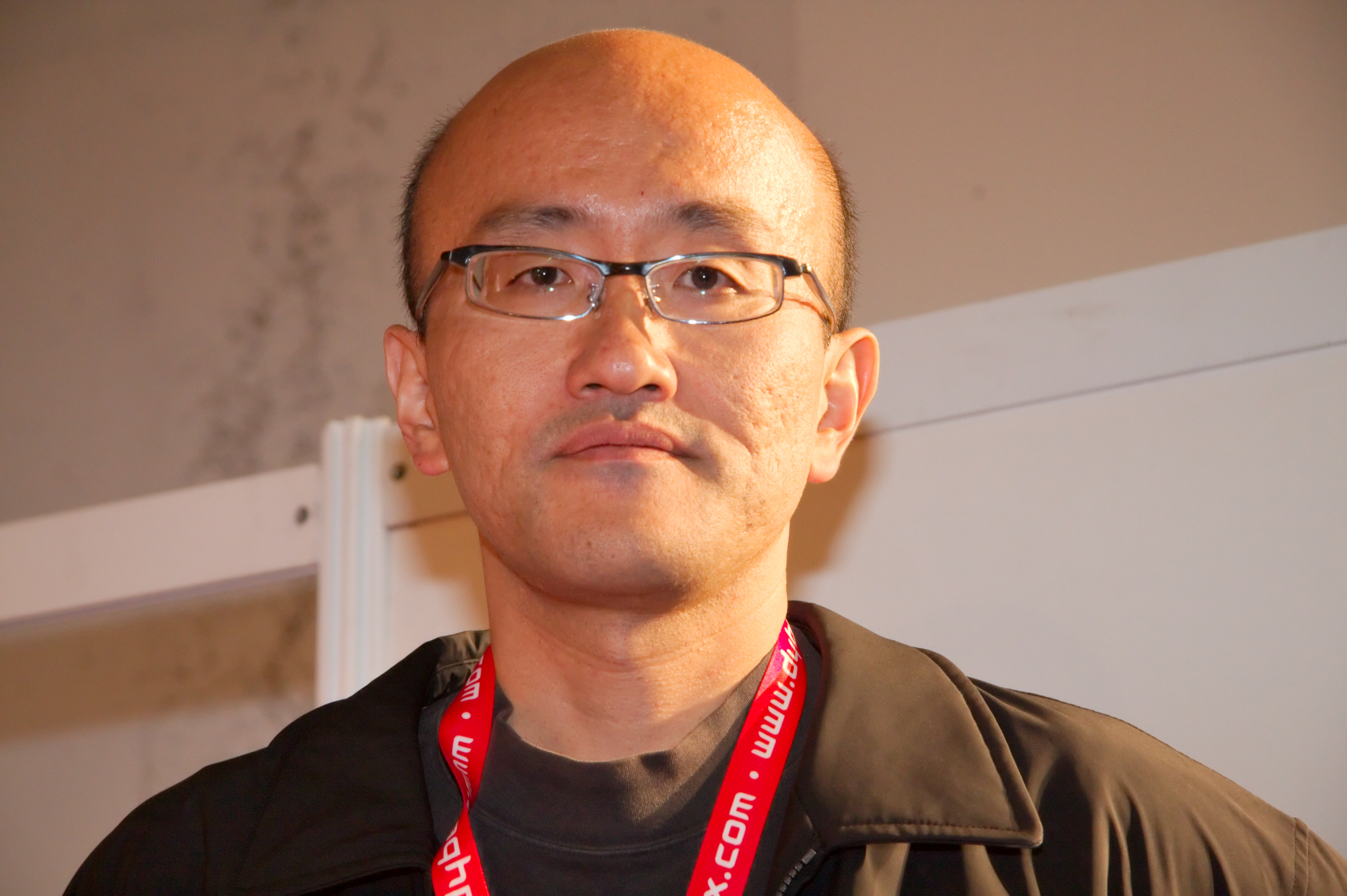
- Sakurai at the Japan Expo in Paris in 2008
- Born: December 19, 1965; Shinjuku-ku, Tokyo, Japan
- Died: December 4, 2015 (aged 49)
- Occupations: Producer; writer

Takamasa Sakurai (櫻井 孝昌, Sakurai Takamasa; December 19, 1965 – December 4, 2015) was a Japanese pop culture and anime expert. Sakurai was a strong proponent for the promotion of Japanese popular culture internationally as a means of cultural exchange and cultural diplomacy. His projects promoted Japanese anime, fashion and music to a global audience. In 2009, Sakurai co-founded the Ministry of Foreign Affairs's "Kawaii Ambassador" program. He also authored several books on the country's aesthetics and pop culture, including "Sekai Kawaii Kakumei" ("World Cuteness Revolution") and Anime Bunka Gaiko (Anime Cultural Diplomacy).

On December 4, 2015, Sakurai was killed when he fell onto the tracks at the Nishi-Nippori Station of the Keihin-Tōhoku Line in Arakawa, Tokyo, around 12:30 a.m. Sakurai, who was 49-years old, may have been intoxicated at the time of the accident. He had lived in the nearby Higashi-Nippon neighborhood of Tokyo.
