= Comic Fiesta =

Annual ACG event in Malaysia

- Status: Active
- Genre: Anime convention ACG event
- Frequency: Annually
- Venue: Kuala Lumpur Convention Centre, Kuala Lumpur
- Country: Malaysia
- Years active: 23
- Inaugurated: 14 December 2002; 23 years ago
- Most recent: 20–21 December 2025
- Next event: 19–20 December 2026
- Attendance: 75,000 (2025)
- Major events: Anime Fest
- Organiser: Comic Fiesta Sdn Bhd; Sequential Arts Youth Society (former)
- Website: www.comicfiesta.org

Comic Fiesta, abbreviated as CF, is Malaysia's longest-running convention that focuses on animation, comics and games (ACG). It is also one of the largest ACG conventions held in Southeast Asia. Its focus is to celebrate all aspects of art, creativity, and ACG culture of Malaysia and abroad. Comic Fiesta is usually held in December at various locations, including the Kuala Lumpur Convention Centre. The annually held CF thus acts as an avenue for cosplayers to meet and display their costume-making skills and character embodiment, as well as to interact with fans.

Starting in 2002, CF was first held in Selangor Chinese Assembly Hall, Kuala Lumpur. It has expanded to include more participants with each passing year and thus has increased the accessibility and the number of activities at the convention. Some of these activities include cosplay competitions, Live Art Demonstration, and Portfolio Review Pavilion. The more recent CF editions, particularly from 2014, also included stage performances, concerts, and visits by special guests such as Danny Choo, Wan Hazmer, and performers from Hololive. Besides Comic Fiesta itself, CF Mini Penang and CF Mini Johor are other CF like events also held in Malaysia. The next edition of CF will be held in between 19 to 20 December 2026 in Kuala Lumpur Convention Centre.

== History ==
Comic Fiesta started as a small exhibition at the Selangor Chinese Assembly Hall in Kuala Lumpur in 2002 and was organised by the SAY Youth Society. Comic Fiesta 2003 did better than its starting year with the venue now changed to Impiana Hotel which is also located in Kuala Lumpur (currently known as Ancasa Hotel and Spa). The space had increased with a standing capacity of 300, which is double the amount than the previous year. The next Comic Fiesta was held at the Malaysian National Visual Art Gallery. Comic Fiesta 2005 and 2006 editions were both held at Sekolah Sri Sedaya. Due to the venue's close proximity to Sunway Pyramid and public transport services, the event happened to be more convenient and accessible. Comic Fiesta 2006 in particular became the birthplace of Cosplay Chess which is also a common fixture at local ACG events. The following year's Comic Fiesta was then moved to Berjaya Times Square, located in Kuala Lumpur.

Comic Fiesta 2008 was held at the Sunway Convention Centre (now known as Sunway Pyramid Convention Centre) in Selangor. Live Art Demonstrations and the Portfolio Review Pavilion debuted in this edition.

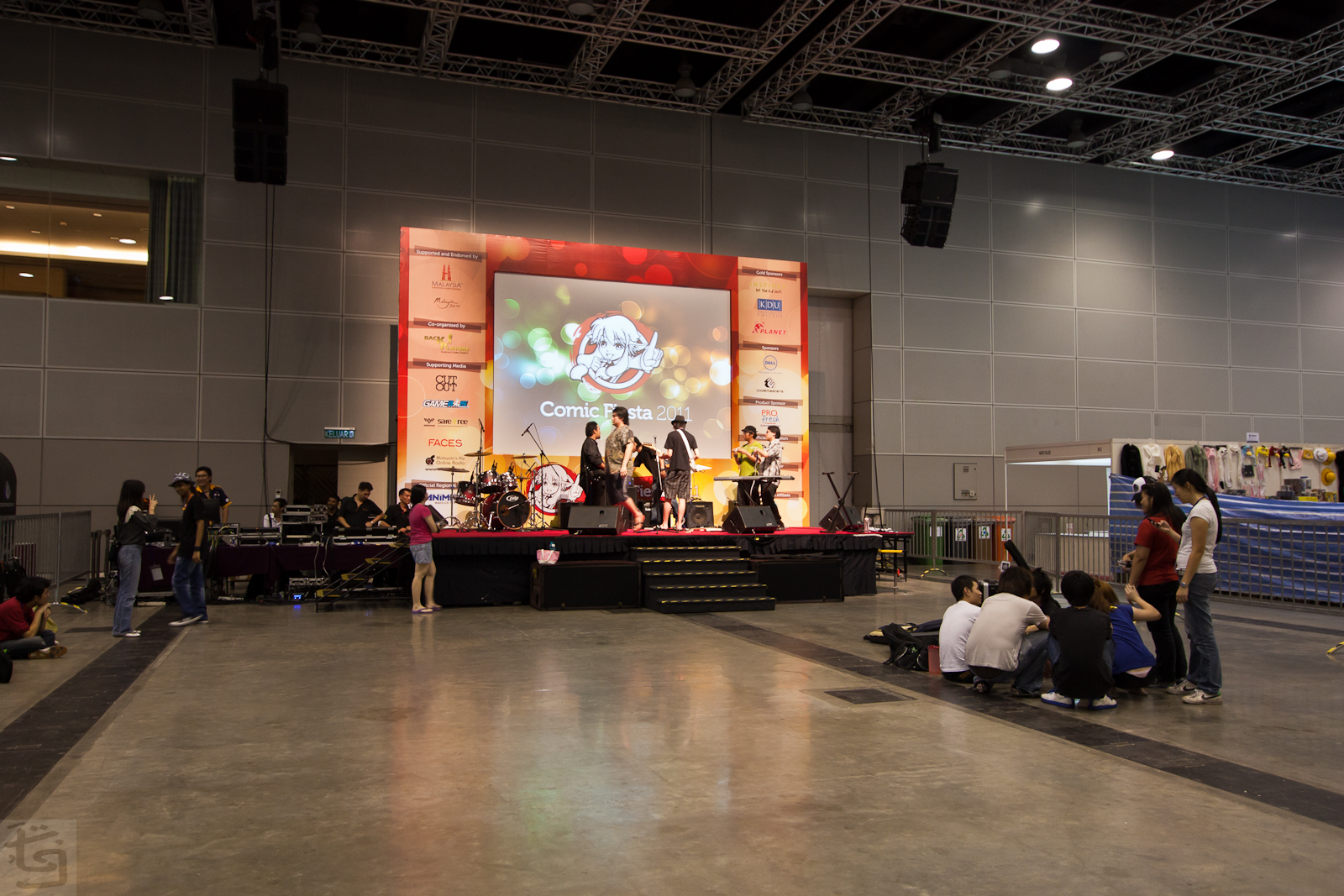
Live stage performance at Comic Fiesta 2011

In 2011, Comic Fiesta was moved to Kuala Lumpur Convention Centre. Comic Fiesta 2011 attracted over 15,000 visitors over two days; and Comic Fiesta 2012, also held at the Kuala Lumpur Convention Centre, drew over 25,000 visitors across two days (22 and 23 December 2012), and was attended by renowned Japanese artists such as Redjuice, Danny Choo and bless4. Internationally, various doujinshi writers from India, Sri Lanka and Indonesia also took part in it.

In 2014, Comic Fiesta was held at Kuala Lumpur Convention Centre from 27 to 28 December with different ACG events held here, including cosplay competition, creative art market booths, game competition finals, stage performances and concert. Producer Shinji Hashimoto and Lead Game Designer Wan Hazmer of Square Enix also held a panel on discussing the future of Final Fantasy by showing the trailer of Final Fantasy XV, which carried some influences of Malaysian life.

In 2016, Comic Fiesta was then moved to Putra World Trade Centre. Comic Fiesta stated it grew rapidly. Guest lineup starring in this event included local performers such as 5 Minute Heroes and Ocean of Fire; international cosplayers Siutao, Miu, Onnies, and Stayxxxx; and popular illustrators Evacomics and Zeen.

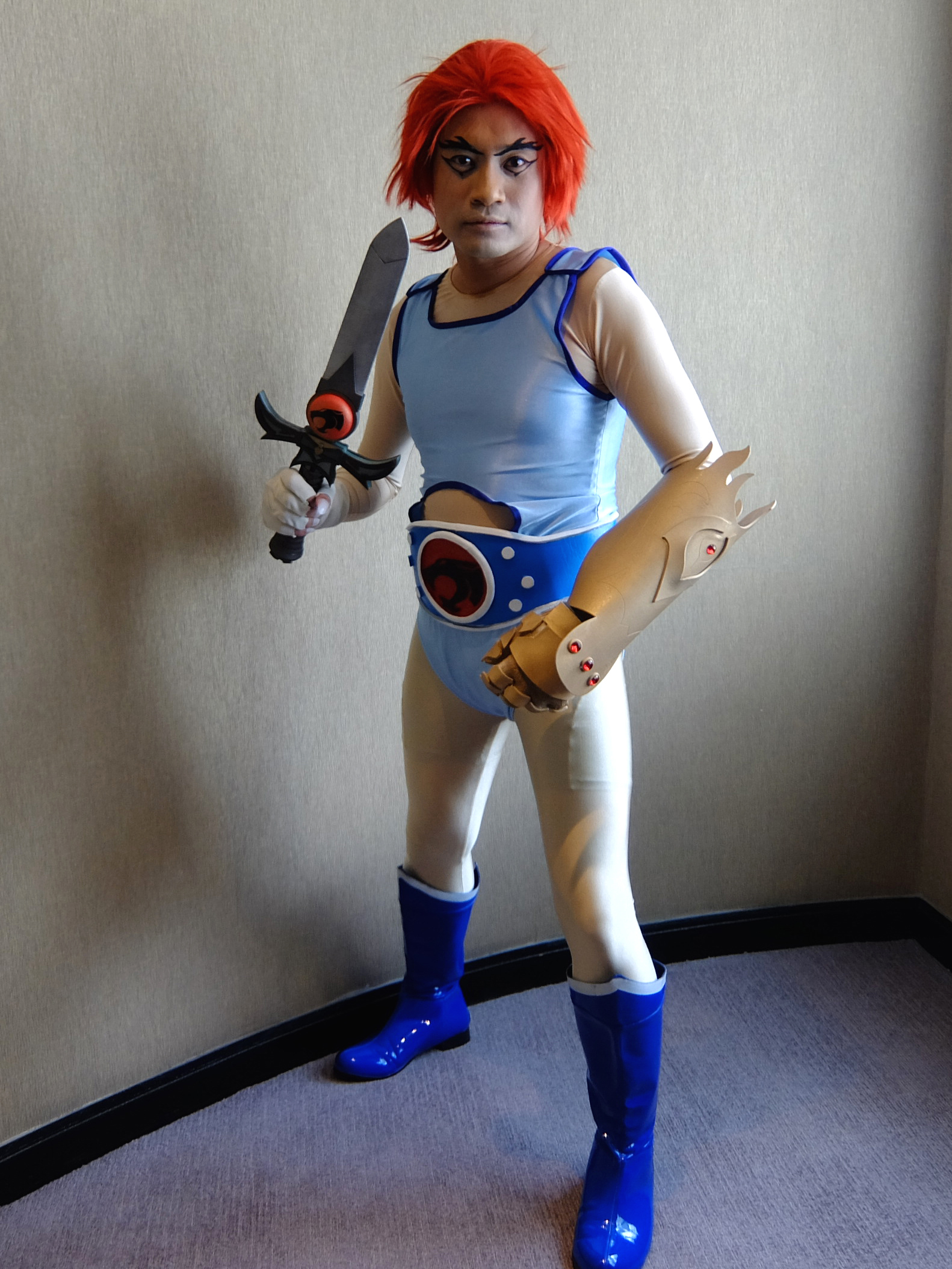
Cosplay of Lion-O at Comic Fiesta 2019

Starting from Comic Fiesta 2017, the location reverted to Kuala Lumpur Convention Centre to accommodate the increasing number of visitors. Comic Fiesta 2018, which was held at Kuala Lumpur Convention Centre from 22 to 23 December 2018, attracted approximately 60,000 visitors. Comic Fiesta 2019 was held in between 21 to 22 December 2019, also at Kuala Lumpur Convention Centre.

Comic Fiesta-associated events, such as the Comic Art Festival Kuala Lumpur 7 (CAFKL7), Comic Fiesta Mini Johor 2020, Comic Fiesta Mini Penang 2020 and the Toys Anime Game Comic Con 2020 (TAGCC 2020) was announced to be postponed to 2021, citing the COVID-19 pandemic in Malaysia.

Making its return in 2022, Comic Fiesta had been held at Kuala Lumpur Convention Centre receiving approximately 69,000 visitors. Special guests included Suzuki Konomi, Akihito Tsukushi and performers from Hololive.

Comic Fiesta in 2024 was held in Kuala Lumpur Convention Centre from 21 to 22 December 2024, which attracted approximately 73,000 visitors. Some of the special guests included various comic companies from Hong Kong supported by HKETO, which also held the opening ceremony of Comic Fiesta that year. Japanese artists such as Suzuki Konomi and Myth & Roid vocalist KIHOW also were the popular segments for the event.

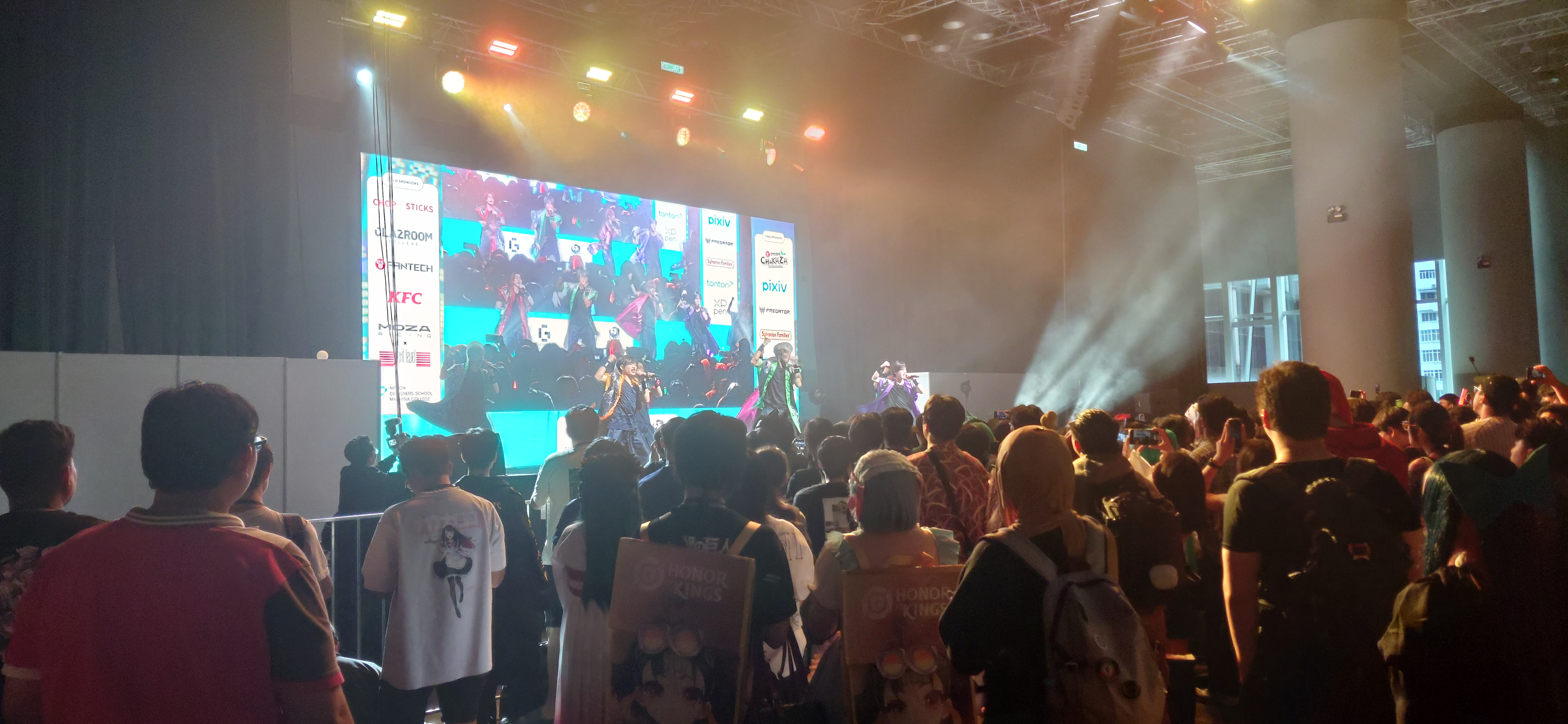
B2Takes performing at Comic Fiesta 2025

Comic Fiesta's most recent edition was held from 21 to 22 December 2025 at Kuala Lumpur Convention Centre which attracted approximately 75,000 visitors, hence making it the most visited CF to date. Some of the special guests included Shoji Kawamori whose film Labyrinth had its premiere screening in the event, Naoki Hamaguchi, Studio Head and Director of Final Fantasy XIV and Wan Hazmer. The television anime Sentenced to be a Hero also had its premiere screening at the event. Hong Kong Pavilion sponsored by CCIDA from Hong Kong had also participated in it. A local artist had some stolen work being sold as a merchandise in the same year's CF.

In 2026, Comic Fiesta will be held in between 19 and 20 December 2026 at the Kuala Lumpur Convention Centre in Kuala Lumpur.

== Showcase ==
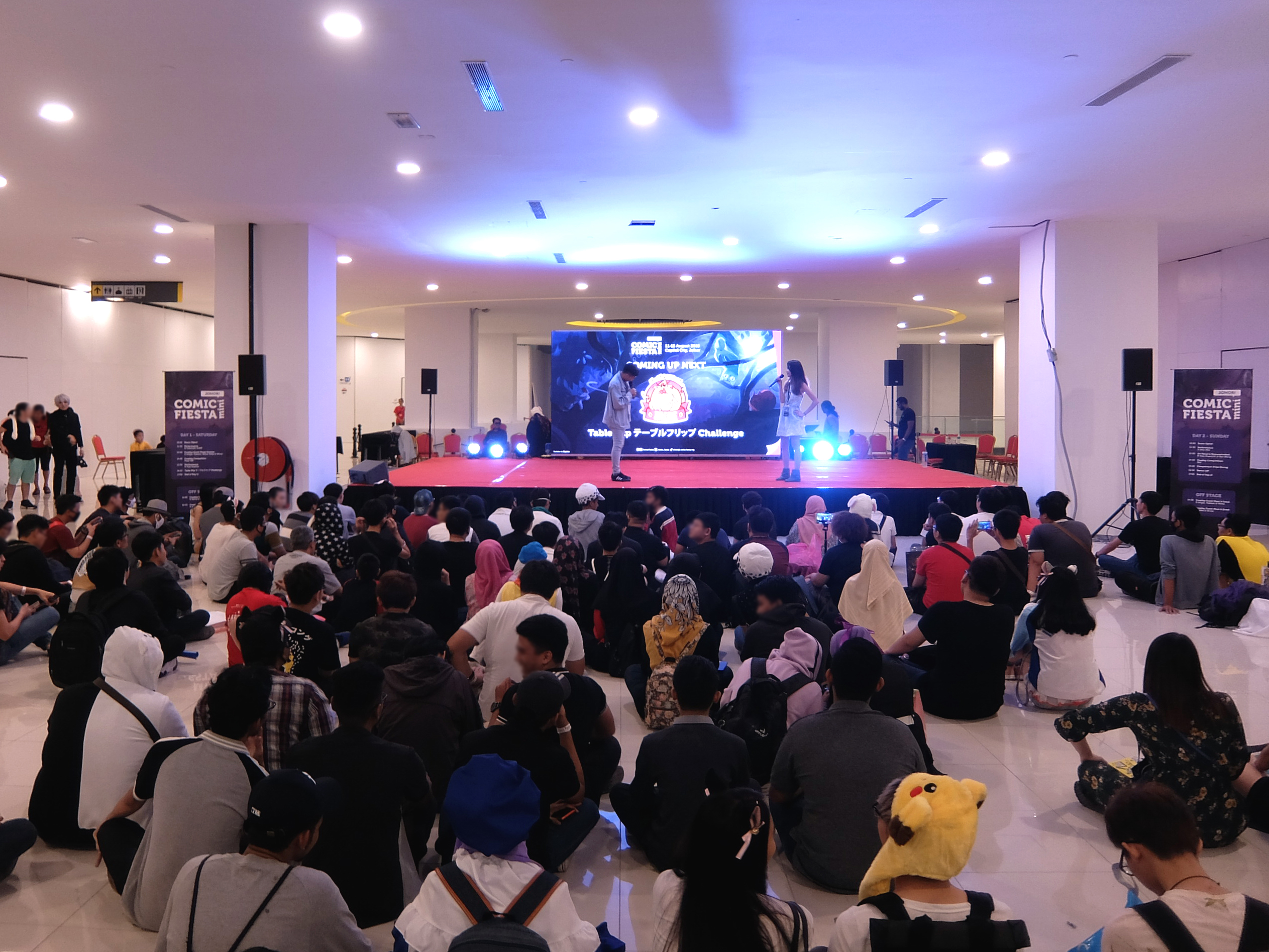
Comic Fiesta Mini Johor 2018

=== Creative Art Market ===
Comic Fiesta plays host to the largest amateur creative art market in Malaysia similar to Comiket of Japan, which consists of over 100 booths showcasing talents in the field of visual arts and illustration. Comic Fiesta also contains a wide variety of self-published comics, artbooks, posters and other merchandises available for sale.

=== Cosplay ===
Comic Fiesta hosts both solo and group cosplay competitions for e.g., Cosplay Invitational, and 60 Seconds of Anything. Participants use the chance to showcase their skills in cosplay, attracting many to attend the event also.

=== Comic Fiesta Mini ===
Comic Fiesta also organizes two small CF-like events specialized for ACG enthusiasts in the north and south of Peninsular Malaysia, namely Comic Fiesta Mini Penang (stylized as CF Mini Penang) and Comic Fiesta Mini Johor (stylized as CF Mini JB, since 2018).

== List of Comic Fiesta events ==
Beginning in 2002, given below is the list of all the Comic Fiesta events annually taking place to-date:

#	Year	Date	Location	Attendance
1	2002	14–15 December	Selangor Chinese Assembly Hall, Kuala Lumpur (now known as The Kuala Lumpur and Selangor Chinese Assembly Hall)	500
2	2003	6 December	Impiana Hotel, Kuala Lumpur (now known as Ancasa Hotel)	1,000
3	2004	11–12 December	Malaysian National Visual Art Gallery (Balai Seni Visual Negara)	3,000
4	2005	17–18 December	Sekolah Sri Sendaya, Subang Jaya (now Sekolah Sri UCSI Subang Jaya)	3,000
5	2006	16–17 December	Sekolah Sri Sendaya, Subang Jaya (now Sekolah Sri UCSI Subang Jaya)	3,000
6	2007	15–16 December	Berjaya Times Square, Kuala Lumpur	5,000
7	2008	20–21 December	Sunway Convention Centre	7,000
8	2009	19–20 December	Sunway Convention Centre	8,000
9	2010	18–19 December	Berjaya Times Square, Kuala Lumpur	10,000
10	2011	17–18 December	Kuala Lumpur Convention Centre, KLCC	15,000
11	2012	22–23 December	Kuala Lumpur Convention Centre, KLCC	25,000
12	2013	21–22 December	Kuala Lumpur Convention Centre, KLCC	40,000
13	2014	27–28 December	Kuala Lumpur Convention Centre, KLCC	49,000
14	2015	19–20 December	Mines International Exhibition & Convention Centre, Seri Kembangan (MIECC)	45,000
15	2016	17–18 December	Putra World Trade Centre, Kuala Lumpur (PWTC)	45,000
16	2017	16–17 December	Kuala Lumpur Convention Centre, KLCC	55,000
17	2018	22–23 December	Kuala Lumpur Convention Centre, KLCC	60,000
18	2019	21–22 December	Kuala Lumpur Convention Centre, KLCC	60,000–65,000
#	2020	Cancelled due to COVID-19 pandemic		
#	2021	Cancelled due to COVID-19 pandemic		
19	2022	17–18 December	Kuala Lumpur Convention Centre, KLCC	65,000–69,000
20	2023	23–24 December	Kuala Lumpur Convention Centre, KLCC	70,000
21	2024	21–22 December	Kuala Lumpur Convention Centre, KLCC	70,000–73,000
22	2025	20–21 December	Kuala Lumpur Convention Centre, KLCC	75,000
