= Blair County Convention Center =

Coordinates: 40.457227°N 78.400324°W

- Interactive map of Blair County Convention Center
- Address: One Convention Center Drive Altoona, Pennsylvania 16602
- Location: Allegheny Township, Blair County, Pennsylvania

Construction
- Opened: May 1, 2001

Blair County Convention Center is a convention center located just south of Altoona, Pennsylvania. It has two floor levels with the exhibit floor and ballroom on separate levels. Rocco Alianiello is the Executive Director and COO. The facility is near the Interstate 99 and Route 36.

== Facility ==
The conference center has a 24,000 square foot exhibit hall, 11 break-out rooms, full-service banquet facilities and themed cafes, multiple sunset patios, and a business resource center.
