= Eastern District, Jackson County, West Virginia =

- Magisterial district
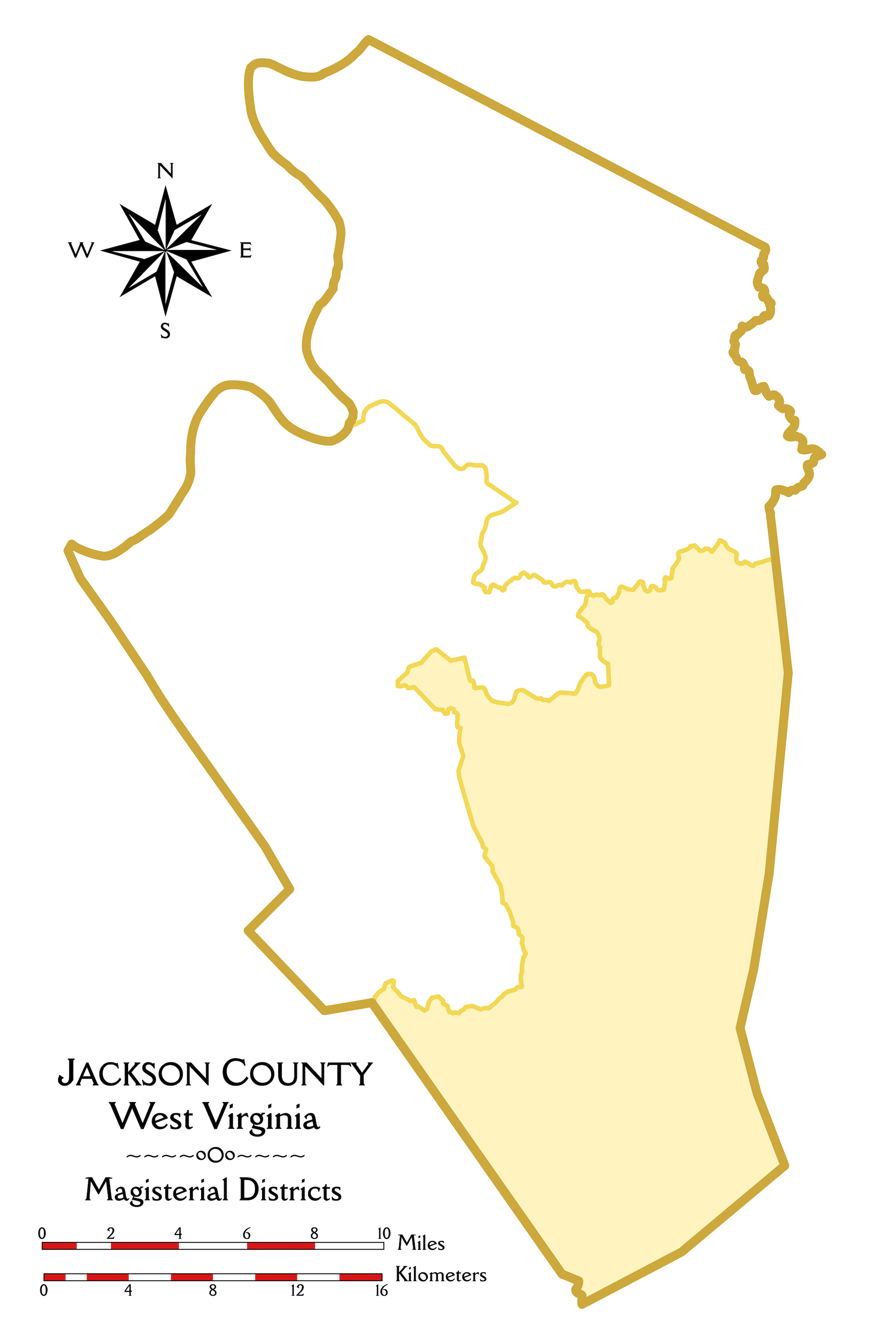
- Location of Eastern District in Jackson County
- Coordinates: 38°43′03″N 81°36′40″W
- Country: United States
- State: West Virginia
- County: Jackson
- Established: 1990s

Area
  - Total: 164.50 sq mi (426.1 km^{2})
  - Land: 163.91 sq mi (424.5 km^{2})
  - Water: 0.59 sq mi (1.5 km^{2})
- Elevation: 682 ft (208 m)

Population (2010)
  - Total: 9,882
  - Density: 60/sq mi (23/km^{2})
- Time zone: UTC-5 (Eastern (EST))
  - Summer (DST): UTC-4 (EDT)

The Eastern Magisterial District is one of three magisterial districts in Jackson County, West Virginia, United States. It was established during a process of redistricting undertaken in the 1990s. In 2010, 9,882 people lived in the district.

== Geography ==
The Eastern District occupies the southeastern portion of Jackson County. To the north, it is bounded by the Northern District, to the east by District I and District III in Roane County, to the south by District 3 and District 4 in Kanawha County, to the southwest by Buffalo-Union District in Putnam County, and to the west by the Western District of Jackson County. Most of the district consists of rolling hills, separated by creeks and low ridges. The district includes the city of Ripley, which is the county seat, and one of only two incorporated towns in Jackson County.

=== Streams ===
The main streams in the northern part of the district are Mill Creek and its various tributaries, several of which arise in the western portion of Roane County. Mill Creek is formed in the northwestern portion of the district, by the confluence of Little Mill Creek and the Elk Fork, both flowing from the east. Little Mill Creek begins in western Roane County, and gathers a number of tributaries, the largest of which is Frozencamp Creek, also flowing out of Roane County. The Elk Fork gathers a number of tributaries from both sides of the Roane County line, and flows northwest until it joins with Little Mill Creek. From their confluence, Mill Creek winds southwest until it meets the Tug Fork, coming from the southeast; the Tug Fork is formed by the confluence of two large creeks: the Bear Fork, flowing northwest, with its headwaters in Roane County, and Grasslick Creek, which winds around several ridges in the western part of the district. From its juncture with the Tug Fork, Mill Creek flows northwest, passing the town of Ripley, from which it continues west and northwest through the Western District of Jackson County, before entering the Ohio River at Millwood.

The southern portion of the district is drained by the Left Fork and Middle Fork of the Pocatalico River. The Left Fork drains the southwestern portion of the district, flowing southward from the confluence of Pocatalico Creek and the Dudden Fork, and continuing to the southernmost point of Jackson County, where it meets with the Middle Fork. Flowing south and southwest out of the southeastern part of the district, the Middle Fork of the Pocatalico gathers a number of tributaries, of which the largest are the Laurel Fork, Second Creek, and Sugar Creek. From their confluence at the southern end of the county, the Left and Middle Forks flow southward through Kanawha County, where they meet the main branch of the river above Sissonville.

=== Communities ===
The only incorporated town in the district is the city of Ripley, located on Mill Creek, about eight miles southeast of the Ohio River. It is the county seat, and with a population estimated at 3,220 in 2017, it is the second-largest city in Jackson County.

Besides Ripley, there are a number of small unincorporated villages spread throughout the district, mainly along the various creeks. Marshall, Frozencamp, and Hereford are located along Little Mill Creek, with the village of Louther on Frozencamp Creek. Gay is on the Elk Fork, while Shatto is on Mill Creek below the confluence of Little Mill Creek and the Elk Fork.

The village of Staats Mills is on the Tug Fork. above Staats Mills, the village of Belgrove is located on the Bear Fork, while Kenna, Fairplain, and Plum Orchard are on Grasslick Creek and its tributaries. Salt Hill is located in the hills above Mill Creek, south of Ripley.

In the southern part of the district, Goldtown and Loop are located on the Left Fork of the Pocatalico River, while Kentuck, Fletcher, and Advent are on the Middle Fork; the village of Mount Tell is on Sugar Creek.

=== Roads and infrastructure ===
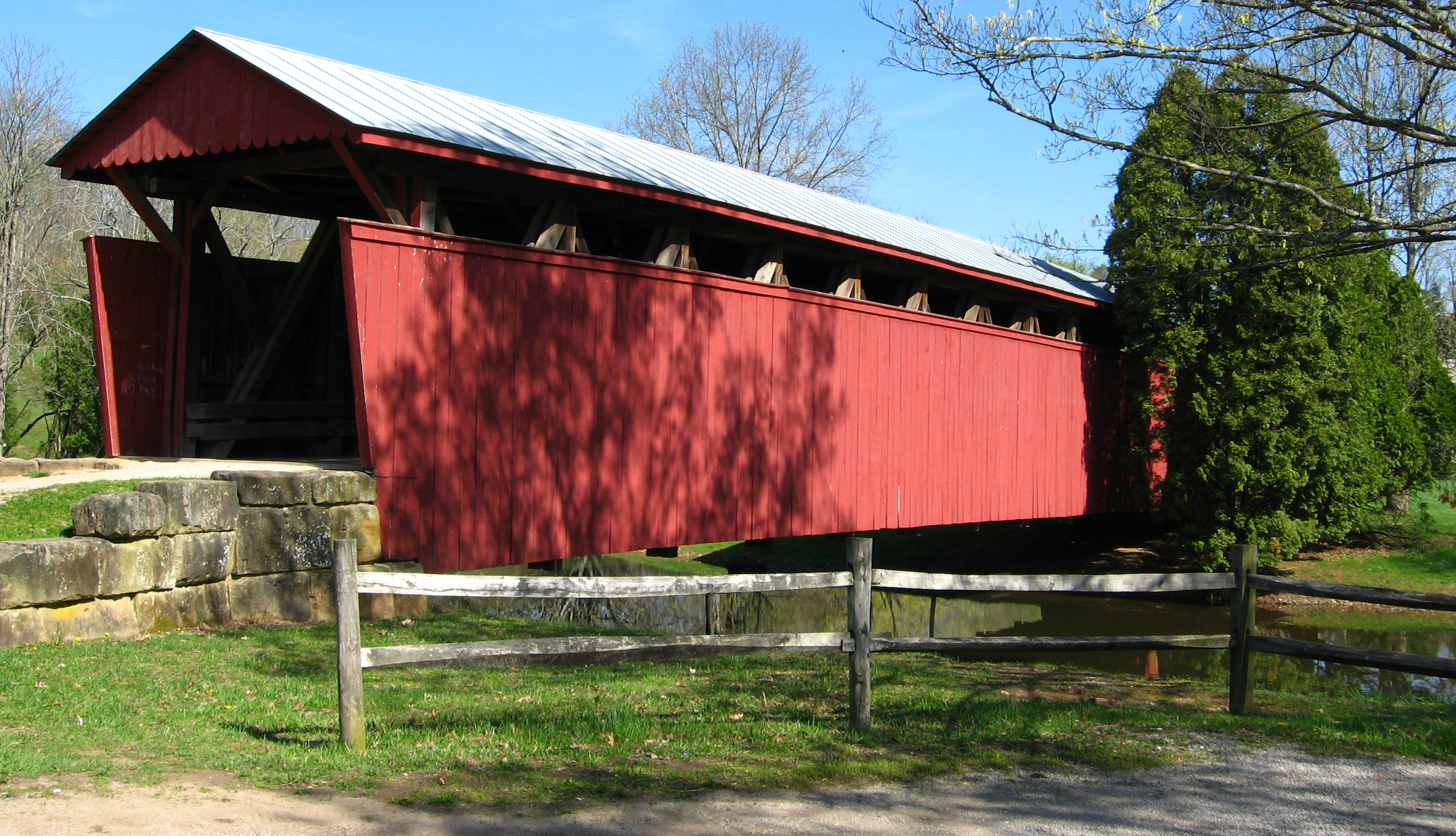
The historic Staats Mill Covered Bridge, now at Cedar Lakes Conference Center.

The main east–west highway in the Eastern District is U.S. Route 33, which travels through the northern part of the district between Ripley and Spencer, in Roane County. The main north–south route is County Road 21, which runs from Ripley north to Parkersburg, and south to Charleston, passing through Fairplain, Kenna, and Goldtown before entering Kanawha County. North of Ripley, it is known locally as the Parkersburg Road, while south of Ripley it is the Charleston Road. Interstate 77 runs through the district, roughly paralleling the Charleston Road, on its way from Charleston to Parkersburg; there are exits at Ripley, Fairplain, Kenna, and Goldtown. Other important roads include West Virginia Route 34, which travels from Interstate 77 at Kenna to Red House in Putnam County.

The Eastern District is also home to the Cedar Lakes Conference Center, a conference center and retreat located along Mill Creek, southeast of Ripley. Originally established in 1955 as a leadership training facility for West Virginia students, the center is owned and operated by the West Virginia Department of Agriculture, and features year-round accommodations for large and small groups, together with a variety of meeting and recreational facilities. The center's grounds include the Staats Mill Covered Bridge, a historic covered bridge originally built over the Tug Fork of Mill Creek at Staats Mills in 1887. The bridge was dismantled and brought to Cedar Lakes, where it was reconstructed in 1983.

== History ==
Historical population
Census	Pop.	Note	%±
2000	9,538		—
2010	9,882		3.6%
2017 (est.)	9,632		−2.5%
United States Census Bureau, U.S. Decennial Census, 2000, 2010.

Little is written about the early settlers of the Eastern District. The first settler at Ripley was William Parsons, who built a cabin on a plateau overlooking Mill Creek, and later sold his land to Jacob Starcher, who would lay out the town between 1828 and 1832. Until 1831, all of the territory that would become Jackson County was part of Mason, Kanawha, and Wood counties. Most of what is now the Eastern District, including the site of Ripley, was part of Mason County; but the southeastern portion of the district was originally in Kanawha County. Soon after the new county's formation, Ripley was named the county seat.

After West Virginia was admitted to the Union in 1863, the counties were divided into civil townships, which were converted into magisterial districts in 1872. Jackson County was divided into five magisterial districts: Grant, Ravenswood, Ripley, Union, and Washington. Except for minor adjustments, the names and boundaries of the historic districts remained largely unchanged from the 1870s until the 1990s, when the county was redistricted in order to equalize the area and population of its magisterial districts as nearly as possible.

All of Washington District was combined with the southern and eastern portions of Ripley District to form the Eastern Magisterial District. The northern, eastern, and southern boundaries of the district follow the original lines of Washington and Ripley Districts, but a new western boundary was drawn, extending the new district along Mill Creek to Ripley, encircling the town, and then running south along the Charleston Road, Pleasant Valley Road, and Jim Ridge Road to the county line. Because redistricting proved confusing with county records, the West Virginia Legislature provided for the original magisterial districts to continue in the form of tax districts, which continued to serve administrative functions other than the apportionment of county officials. The current magisterial districts are used for those functions requiring equal representation between the residents of the various district, and as such are currently the minor civil division of record for the United States Census Bureau.
