= Washington District, Jackson County, West Virginia =

- Magisterial district
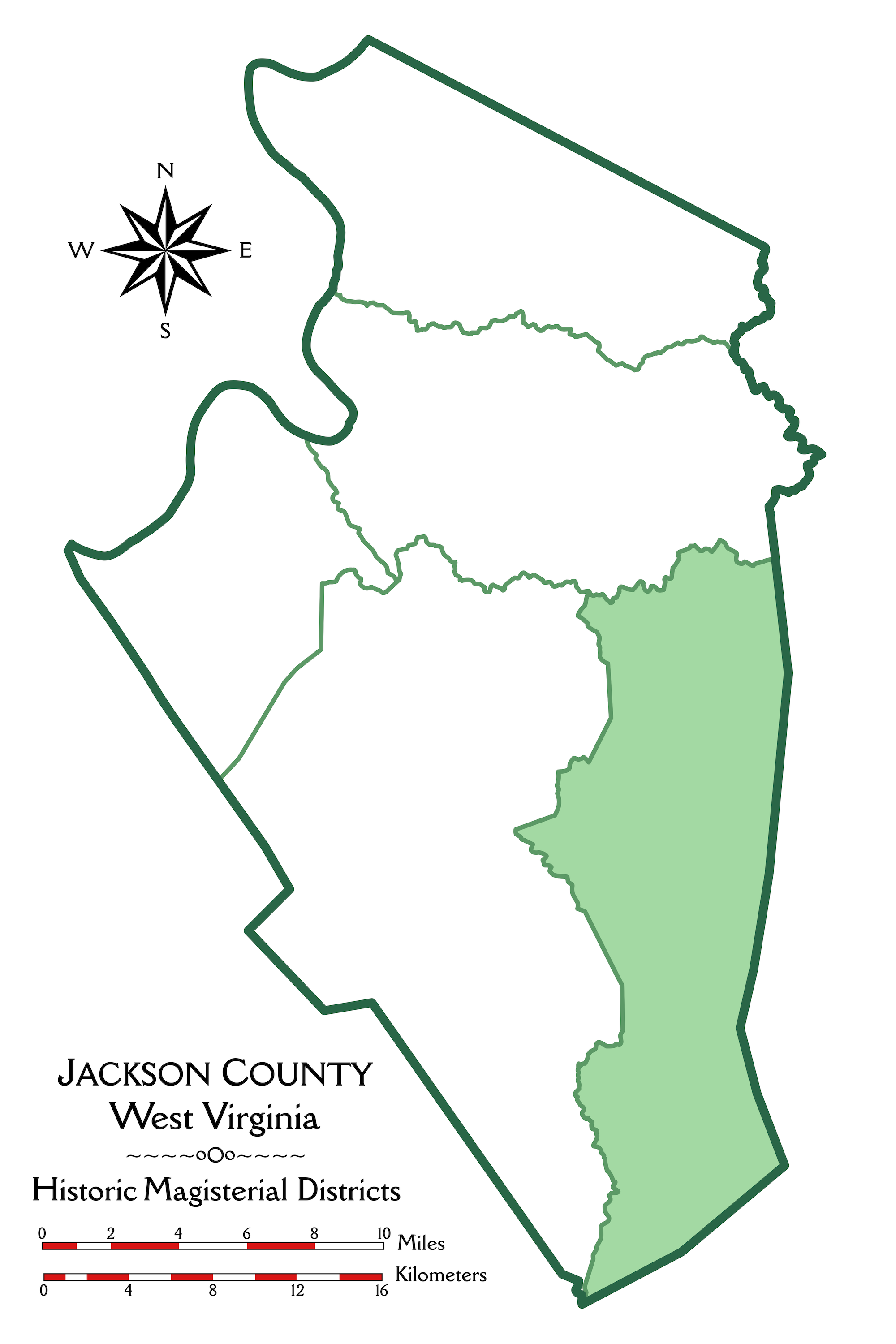
- Location of Washington District in Jackson County
- Coordinates: 38°43′58″N 81°34′54″W
- Country: United States
- State: West Virginia
- County: Jackson
- Established: 1863
- Named for: George Washington

Area
  - Total: 105.41 sq mi (273.01 km^{2})
  - Land: 105.41 sq mi (273.01 km^{2})
  - Water: 0 sq mi (0.00 km^{2})

Population (2010)
  - Total: N/A
- Time zone: UTC-5 (Eastern (EST))
  - Summer (DST): UTC-4 (EDT)

Washington District, formerly Washington Magisterial District, is one of five historic magisterial districts in Jackson County, West Virginia, United States. The district was originally established as one of five civil townships in Jackson County after West Virginia became a state in 1863; in 1872, all of West Virginia's townships were converted into magisterial districts. When Jackson County was redistricted in the 1990s, Washington District was combined with the eastern portion of Ripley District, including the city of Ripley, to form the new Eastern Magisterial District. However, the county's historic magisterial districts continue to exist in the form of tax districts, serving all of their former administrative functions except for the election of county officials.

== Geography ==
Washington District is located in the southeastern portion of Jackson County. To the north, it is bounded by Ravenswood District; to the west by Ripley District; to the south by District 4, formerly by Poca District, in Kanawha County; and to the east by District I and District III, formerly Harper, Curtis, and Reedy Districts, in Roane County. Most of the district consists of rolling hills, separated by creeks and low ridges.

=== Streams ===
All of the principal streams in Washington District are tributaries of either Mill Creek, which flows through the center of Jackson County and empties into the Ohio River at Millwood in Union District, or the Middle Fork of the Pocatalico River, draining the southern part of the district. The only other streams are Whiteoak Creek, and other tributaries of the main branch of the Pocatalico River, along the southeastern boundary of the district.

Mill Creek is formed from the confluence of Little Mill Creek and the Elk Fork in eastern Ripley District; both streams arise in western Roane County, and drain the northern part of Washington District as they flow westward. Little Mill Creek enters the district at its easternmost point, and is met by Buffalo Creek, also flowing westward out of Roane County, at the former village of Buffalo, half a mile west of the county line. Two miles to the west, Little Mill Creek is joined by Little Creek, flowing southwest out of western Roane County; its tributaries include the Poplar Fork and Mitchell Run. Half a mile further downstream is the village of Frozencamp, along the mouth of Big Run. In the hills north of Frozencamp, Big Run divides into Right and Left Forks, running from the northern end of the district; just above Frozencamp, Big Run is met by Board Run.

Below the village of Frozencamp, Little Mill Creek is met by Frozencamp Creek, flowing northwest. Two miles above its mouth, Frozencamp Creek divides into Right and Left Forks, both flowing westward out of Roane County. Above the village of Louther, the Right Fork of Frozencamp is joined by McCrady Run. Two miles below Frozencamp is the village of Hereford, West Virginia, along the eastern boundary of the district. At Hereford, Joes Run flows out of the northwestern corner of Washington District and joins Little Mill Creek. Joes Run is met by Poverty Run a short distance above the village, then divides into Right and Left Forks a mile above Hereford.

The Elk Fork of Mill Creek flows northwest out of the central portion of Washington District; its upper waters arise in western Roane County. Its Left Fork flows westward out of Roane County, and is joined by Wash Run, then turns southward below the village of Gay, before joining the main branch of the creek. The Elk Fork then continues westward, and is met by Billy Run, flowing northwest out of western Roane County, and Brush Run, coming from the south. As it winds northwest through the hills, the Elk Fork is met by Forked Run, Haw Run, Spruce Run, Claylick Run, and Rocklick Run. After curving around Horseshoe Bend, the creek is met by Welch Run, coming from the west; and just after the Elk Fork crosses into Ripley District, it is joined by Scale Run, flowing southwest out of Washington District.

The third branch of Mill Creek in Washington District is the Tug Fork, formed by the confluence of the Bear Fork and Grasslick Creek in the center of the district. The Bear Fork arises in western Roane County, and winds northwest through Washington district, until it joins Grasslick Creek, flowing eastward out of Ripley District. As the Tug Fork, the creek continues in a northwesterly direction, until it enters Ripley District about two miles above its juncture with Mill Creek. In its upper course, the Bear Fork is met by Upper Big Run and Lower Big Run, flowing northeast, and the Beech Fork, flowing southwest out of Roane County. Just above Belgrove it is met by the Laurel Fork, coming from the southwest; half a mile above its mouth, the Laurel Fork divides into its Right Fork, curving westward around a hill, and its main branch, coming from the south; Boardtree Run is a tributary of the main branch.

At Belgrove, Long Run extends into the hills east of the village; below Belgrove, the Bear Fork is joined by Laurel Run, coming from the northeast, and Straight Run, from the site of Aplin, to the north; Lower Run and Alumrock Run are tributaries of Laurel Run. The Bear Fork then meets with Grasslick Creek, all the major tributaries of which are in Ripley District, except for Wildcat Run and Little Wildcat Run. The Tug Fork meets with Richards Run above Staats Mills; at Staats Mills, the creek is met by Cranesnest Run; Gandees Run joins the creek below the village. Before leaving Washington District, the Tug Fork is joined by Grass Run and Little Grass Run; another, smaller creek also called Bear Fork; Boar Run, Fourmile Run, and Buffalolick Run.

The southern portion of Washington District is drained by the Middle Fork of the Pocatalico River, initially flowing southwest from the district's eastern flank. Above the village of Fletcher, the Middle Fork is joined by Pleasant Run and several smaller streams. At Fletcher, it meets Mudlick Run, and continues southward until it meets the Laurel Fork, flowing out of the hills west of Kentuck, where its main branch is met by its Left Fork. Below the Laurel Fork, the river is met by Pigeonroost Run, then Second Creek, flowing from the northeast, and First Creek, from the east; Spruce Run is a tributary of Second Creek.

The Middle Fork turns southwest below First Creek, and is met by Sugar Creek, flowing south along the western edge of the district; Johns Branch is a tributary of Sugar Creek. Below Sugar Creek, the river is joined by the Short Branch, Wolfpen Branch, Matthews Branch, and Rockheap Branch. The river continues to the southernmost point in the district, where it meets with the Left Fork of the Pocatalico along the Kanawha County line, continuing southward into Kanawha County, and joining the river's main branch.

In the southeastern corner of Washington District is White Oak Run, which flows southeast out of Jackson County, crossing the northernmost point of Kanawha County, and entering Roane County, where it joins the main branch of the Pocatalico River.

=== Communities ===
There are no incorporated towns in Washington District, but there are a number of unincorporated communities, most of which are on the various branches of Mill Creek.

Marshall, Frozencamp, and Hereford lie along the waters of Little Mill Creek, while Louther is on the Right Fork of Frozencamp Creek. The village of Gay is on the Left Fork of the Elk Fork. Belgrove is located on the Bear Fork, while Staats Mills and Skidmore are further down the Tug Fork; the former village of Aplin was on a ridge northeast of that creek.

Several villages lie along the branches of the Middle Fork of the Pocatalico, in the southern part of the district. Fletcher is on the main branch, while Kentuck is on the Laurel Fork; Advent is on Second Creek; while Mount Tell and Romance lie along Sugar Creek.

=== Roads and transportation ===
The only highway in Washington District is U.S. Route 33, known locally as the Spencer Road, which crosses the district from west to east between Ripley and Spencer, in Roane County, following the course of Little Mill Creek. Other important routes include Gay Road, which travels along the course of the Elk Fork between U.S. 33 and the village of Gay, and Staats Mills Road, which runs along Southall Ridge to Staats Mills, then continues eastward through the district.

== History ==
Historical population
Census	Pop.	Note	%±
1870	1,449		—
1880	2,579		78.0%
1890	3,023		17.2%
1900	4,384		45.0%
1910	4,519		3.1%
1920	4,240		−6.2%
1930	3,393		−20.0%
1940	3,587		5.7%
1950	2,742		−23.6%
1960	2,089		−23.8%
1970	1,919		−8.1%
1980	2,595		35.2%
1990	2,696		3.9%
United States Census Bureau, U.S. Decennial Census, 1870–1990.

Until 1831, the land that would become Jackson County was part of Mason, Wood, and Kanawha Counties; most of Washington District was part of Mason County, except for the southernmost portion, which was in Kanawha County. Prior to the civil war, most counties in Virginia were not subdivided into smaller units. Jackson County was one of forty-eight Virginia counties admitted to the Union as the state of West Virginia on June 20, 1863. On July 31 of that year, the West Virginia Legislature passed an act requiring the division of the counties into civil townships. Section five of the bill appointed George L. Kennedy, John Johnson, Robert R. Riley, Abraham Slaughter, and George Click to establish Jackson County's townships.

Washington was one of the five original townships of Jackson County. The original purpose of the townships was to provide for local government, as well as local control over revenue and the newly created system of free public schools. However, the rural nature of the state proved an impediment to participation in township government, and revenues fell far below expectations. In 1872, the townships were converted into magisterial districts, serving various administrative purposes, but having no governmental function.

The names and boundaries of Jackson County's magisterial districts remained largely unchanged until the 1990s, when the county was redistricted in order to equalize the area and population of its magisterial districts as nearly as possible. Washington District was combined with the eastern portion of Ripley District, including the town of Ripley, to form the new Eastern Magisterial District. However, redistricting in a number of counties created confusion with land and tax records, so the legislature provided for the establishment of tax districts, following the lines of the historic magisterial districts, and serving all administrative functions other than the apportionment of county officials. As a result, Washington District remains an administrative unit of Jackson County, (Note: Because the magisterial districts were redrawn in order to equalize voter representation, the United States Census Bureau recognizes them as West Virginia's minor civil division, and thus no longer collects population statistics for Washington District.) although it is no longer one of the magisterial districts.
