= Ripley District, Jackson County, West Virginia =

- Magisterial district
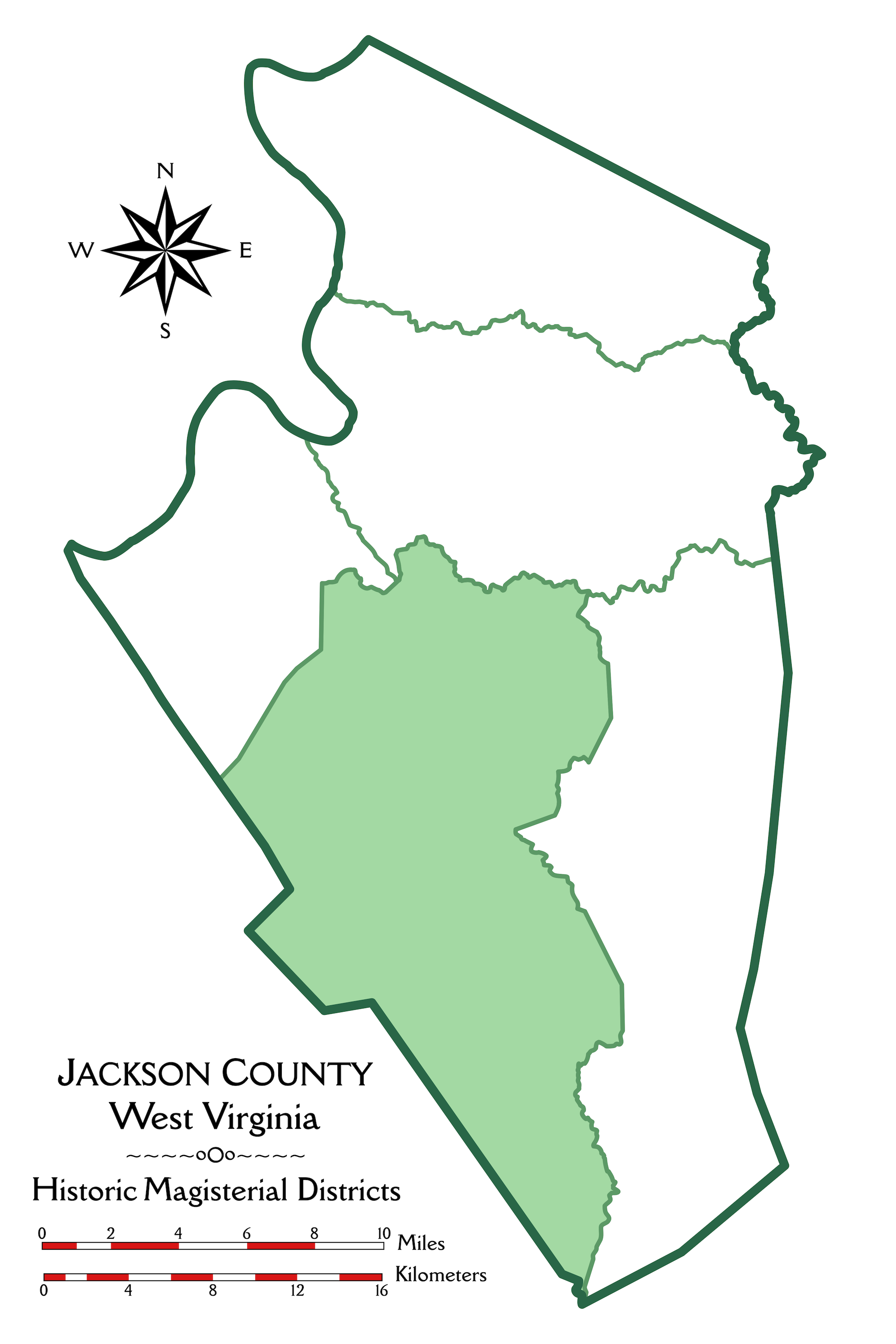
- Location of Ripley District in Jackson County
- Coordinates: 38°44′57″N 81°42′22″W
- Country: United States
- State: West Virginia
- County: Jackson
- Established: 1863
- Named for: Harry Ripley

Area
  - Total: 145.30 sq mi (376.33 km^{2})
  - Land: 145.21 sq mi (376.09 km^{2})
  - Water: 0.093 sq mi (0.24 km^{2})

Population (2010)
  - Total: N/A
- Time zone: UTC-5 (Eastern (EST))
  - Summer (DST): UTC-4 (EDT)

Ripley District, formerly Ripley Magisterial District, is one of five historic magisterial districts in Jackson County, West Virginia, United States. The district was originally known as Mill Creek Township, one of five civil townships established in Jackson County after West Virginia became a state in 1863; it was renamed "Ripley Township" after its chief town in 1871, and the following year, all of West Virginia's townships were converted into magisterial districts. When Jackson County was redistricted in the 1990s, the area of Ripley District was divided between the new Eastern and Western Magisterial Districts. However, the county's historic magisterial districts continue to exist in the form of tax districts, serving all of their former administrative functions except for the election of county officials.

== Geography ==
Ripley District is located in the central and southern portions of Jackson County. To the north, it is bounded by Ravenswood District, to the east by Washington District, to the northwest by Union District, and to the southwest by Union District in Mason County, Buffalo-Union District, formerly Union District in Putnam County, and District 3 and District 4, formerly Poca District, in Kanawha County. With an area of 145 square miles, it is the largest of Jackson County's historic districts. Most of Ripley District is hilly, except for the bottomlands along Mill Creek and its numerous tributaries.

=== Streams ===
The principal stream of Ripley District is Mill Creek, which traverses the district from east to west, with its upper waters arising in the western portion of Roane County, then crossing Washington District on its way to Ripley; below Ripley the creek continues in a northwesterly direction through Union District, and empties into the Ohio River at Millwood, West Virginia. It is sometimes known as "Big" Mill Creek to distinguish it from two other streams in Jackson County, both known as "Little Mill Creek", one in Union District, and the other a tributary of Big Mill Creek.

Mill Creek is formed by the confluence of Little Mill Creek and the Elk Fork, about seven miles above Ripley, in the eastern part of the district. Most of Little Mill Creek is in Washington District, and its upper waters reach all the way into Roane County. It flows westward into Ripley District just below the village of Hereford, where it is met by Joes Run. Between Hereford and its confluence with the Elk Fork, Little Mill Creek is joined by Stationcamp Run, coming from the west past Mount Olive Church. Most of the Elk Fork is likewise in Washington District, but just after entering Ripley District it meets with Scale Run, flowing southwest out of Washington District, and Wolf Run, coming from the south. After Little Mill Creek and the Elk Fork converge, Mill Creek winds southwest through the hills and past the village of Shatto, until it meets the Tug Fork, coming from the southeast, about four miles above Ripley.

Most of the Tug Fork and its tributaries are in Washington District, with some extending all the way into Roane County; but one of the largest, Grasslick Creek, lies mostly in Ripley District. Its upper waters flow out of the hills east of Garnes Knob, and the creek flows northward past the village of Kenna, continuing northward for more than three miles, accumulating numerous smaller tributaries, including Pleasant Valley Run, the Shamblen Branch, and the Coleman Branch, all coming from the west. It then meets Grasslick Run, flowing from the north out of the hills above Fairplain, and curves around a ridge, traveling southeast for two miles, until it meets Stonelick Creek, coming from the south above Plum Orchard; Gin Run is an upper tributary of Stonelick Creek. Turning east, Grasslick Creek flows past Plum Orchard, and meets Plum Orchard Run coming from the south, before flowing eastward into Washington District. In Washington District, Grasslick Creek meets the Bear Fork to form the Tug Fork of Mill Creek.

At Ripley, Mill Creek is joined by Sycamore Creek, coming from the east, and flowing around the plateau where the town was built; the Left Fork of Sycamore flows out of the hills north of Ripley. Below the town, Bullfrog Run, Burnt Run, and Claylick Run flow into Mill Creek from the Northwest, and the creek turns westward toward the district boundary. Before leaving Ripley District, Mill Creek is joined by Parchment Creek, coming from the south; Mud Run, flowing from the north; and Isaacs Run, running northeast past the village of Evans.

Parchment Creek has an extensive watershed, with its upper course flowing out of the hills southeast of Given, where it meets with Wolfe Creek. Continuing northward, it meets with Kissel Run, coming from the west, then the Cox Fork, flowing from the east out of the hollows south of Reynolds Hill. Above the village of Parchment Valley, the creek meets with Wolfpen Run, flowing northeast, then below the village with Grass Run, flowing southwest. Parchment Creek continues westward, meeting with Bull Run, coming from the south, then Roundknob Run, flowing northeast from Danstown, and Johns Run, where the creek turns northward toward Mill Creek.

Other streams in Ripley District include the Left Fork of the Pocatalico River, which drains the southern portion of the district; the upper course of Thirteenmile Creek, which flows out of Douglas Hollow above the village of Rockcastle, then flows northwest into Mason County; and the upper waters of Eighteenmile Creek, most of which is in Putnam County. The Left Fork of the Pocatalico is formed in Ripley District by the confluence of Pocatalico Creek and the Dudden Fork, south of Goldtown. Above Goldtown, Pocatalico Creek is joined by the Dog Fork, which curves through Jackson, Putnam, and Kanawha Counties, before returning to Jackson County in its lower course. Before leaving Jackson County, the Left Fork is joined by the Spicewood Branch, coming from the west. The southernmost portion of the boundary separating Ripley District from Kanawha County follows the course of the Left Fork.

=== Communities ===
The only incorporated settlement in Ripley District is the city of Ripley, located on a plateau overlooking Mill Creek, in the northern part of the district. It is the county seat, and home of the Jackson County Courthouse. For most of its history, Ripley has been the second-largest town in Jackson County, behind Ravenswood, on the Ohio River.

Besides the town of Ripley, the district is home to a number of unincorporated communities. Further up the main branch of Mill Creek, the village of Shatto is about five miles above Ripley. In the central part of the district, Kenna lies at the headwaters of Grasslick Creek, while Fairplain is on Grasslick Run, a tributary of the former. Plum Orchard lies along the lower course of Grasslick Creek, just before it crosses into Washington District. On the Left Fork of Sycamore Creek, which joins Mill Creek just below Ripley, is the village of Sidneyville.

Parchment Valley, as its name suggests, lies in the valley of Parchment Creek, about four miles above the mouth of that stream. The village of Given is about four miles above Parchment Valley. Below Parchment Valley is Mount Moriah, on a hill overlooking a bend in the creek, opposite the mouth of Bull Run. Danstown is on Roundknob Run, the next tributary of Parchment Creek below Mount Moriah. Foster Chapel, West Virginia is in the hills south of Danstown. The village of Evans is on Isaacs Run, in the western part of the district.

In the southern part of the district, Goldtown lies along Pocatalico Creek, while the village of Loop is further downstream, on the Left Fork of the Pocatalico River, near the southernmost corner of Ripley District. The former village of Edgar is in the hills above the headwaters of Eighteenmile Creek. Rockcastle is on the upper waters of Thirteenmile Creek, in a portion of the district that belonged to Mason County until 1866.

=== Roads and transportation ===
The main north–south highway in Ripley District is County Road 21, which runs between Charleston and Parkersburg, through the center of the district. South of Ripley, it is known locally as the Charleston Road, and runs past Loop, Goldtown, Kenna, and Fairplain; south of Kenna it is joined by West Virginia Route 34, coming from Red House in Putnam County. North of Ripley, County Road 21 becomes the Parkersburg Road.

The main east–west highway is West Virginia Route 62, formerly part of U.S. Route 33 west of Ripley, which runs to Cottageville, and then on to Ripley Landing, along the Ohio River in Union District. Continuing through Ripley, it becomes Main Street and U.S. Route 33, otherwise known as the Spencer Road, traveling eastward to Spencer in Roane County.

Interstate 77 runs through the district, roughly paralleling County Road 21, with exits at Goldtown, Fairplain, and Ripley, on its way from Charleston to Parkersburg.

For most of the twentieth century, a spur line of the Baltimore and Ohio Railroad, known as the Ripley Branch, traveled between Millwood and Ripley.

== History ==
Historical population
Census	Pop.	Note	%±
1870	2,821		—
1880	4,208		49.2%
1890	4,961		17.9%
1900	6,641		33.9%
1910	5,992		−9.8%
1920	5,092		−15.0%
1930	4,704		−7.6%
1940	5,239		11.4%
1950	5,799		10.7%
1960	6,846		18.1%
1970	7,642		11.6%
1980	10,050		31.5%
1990	10,229		1.8%
United States Census Bureau, U.S. Decennial Census, 1870–1990.

To a large extent, the history of Ripley District is synonymous with that of the town of Ripley. The first settler was William Parsons, who built a log cabin on a plateau overlooking Mill Creek. He later sold this land to Jacob Starcher. Until 1831, the land that would become Jackson County was part of Mason, Wood, and Kanawha Counties; most of Ripley District was part of Mason County, except for the southernmost portion, which was in Kanawha County. Soon after Jackson County's formation, the town of Ripley was chosen as the county seat.

The town began to take shape between 1828 and 1832, on land donated by Jacob Starcher and his wife, Anna; they and several of their relatives were key to the town's development. It was named in honour of Harry Ripley, a young man who had recently drowned in Mill Creek, shortly before he was to be married. A log schoolhouse was built in 1829, and the first schoolmaster was John Armstrong, later a physician at Ripley. The first county court was held at the house of Joel Sayre, Jacob Starcher's son-in-law, in 1831; the following year a courthouse was erected at what became the Ripley town square, and Robert Lowther was appointed the first postmaster of Jackson Court House, as the post office was officially named.

The town soon flourished, as merchants Alfred Beauchamp and James and Nehemiah Smith opened stores in 1833, and hotels were established the same year by William Carney and Jacob Staats, the latter a brother-in-law of Jacob Starcher. Staats' son-in-law, Joseph Bolen, opened a blacksmith shop at Ripley in 1834. Jacob Starcher built a water-powered floating grist mill in 1836, and soon afterward established the town's first sawmill. Joseph Mairs was the town's first physician, and a Methodist church was built at Ripley about 1840. The original courthouse was replaced by a new structure, built by Nicholas H. Bonnett, also a son-in-law of Jacob Staats, in 1858. A woolen mill came to Ripley in 1866.

Prior to the civil war, most counties in Virginia were not subdivided into smaller units. Jackson County was one of forty-eight Virginia counties admitted to the Union as the state of West Virginia on June 20, 1863. On July 31 of that year, the West Virginia Legislature passed an act requiring the division of the counties into civil townships. Section five of the bill appointed George L. Kennedy, John Johnson, Robert R. Riley, Abraham Slaughter, and George Click to establish Jackson County's townships.

Mill Creek Township, later Ripley, was one of the five original townships of Jackson County; it was given its present name in 1871. The original purpose of the townships was to provide for local government, as well as local control over revenue and the newly created system of free public schools. However, the rural nature of the state proved an impediment to participation in township government, and revenues fell far below expectations. In 1872, the townships were converted into magisterial districts, serving various administrative purposes, but having no governmental function.

The only major change in the boundaries of any of Jackson County's historic districts occurred in 1866, when a trapezoidal section of eastern Union Township in Mason County, surrounding the village of Rockcastle and the upper waters of Thirteenmile Creek, was transferred to Mill Creek Township in Jackson County. Otherwise, the names and boundaries of Jackson County's magisterial districts remained largely unchanged until the 1990s, when the county was redistricted in order to equalize the area and population of its magisterial districts as nearly as possible.

The western portions of Ripley District, excluding the town of Ripley, were combined with Union District and the southwestern portion of Ravenswood District, to form the new Western Magisterial District. The eastern part of Ripley District, together with the city of Ripley, were combined with Washington District to form the new Eastern Magisterial District. However, redistricting in a number of counties created confusion with land and tax records, so the legislature provided for the establishment of tax districts, following the lines of the historic magisterial districts, and serving all administrative functions other than the apportionment of county officials. As a result, Ripley District remains an administrative unit of Jackson County, (Note: Because the magisterial districts were redrawn in order to equalize voter representation, the United States Census Bureau recognizes them as West Virginia's minor civil division, and thus no longer collects population statistics for Ripley District.) although it is no longer one of the magisterial districts.
