= Western District, Jackson County, West Virginia =

- Magisterial district
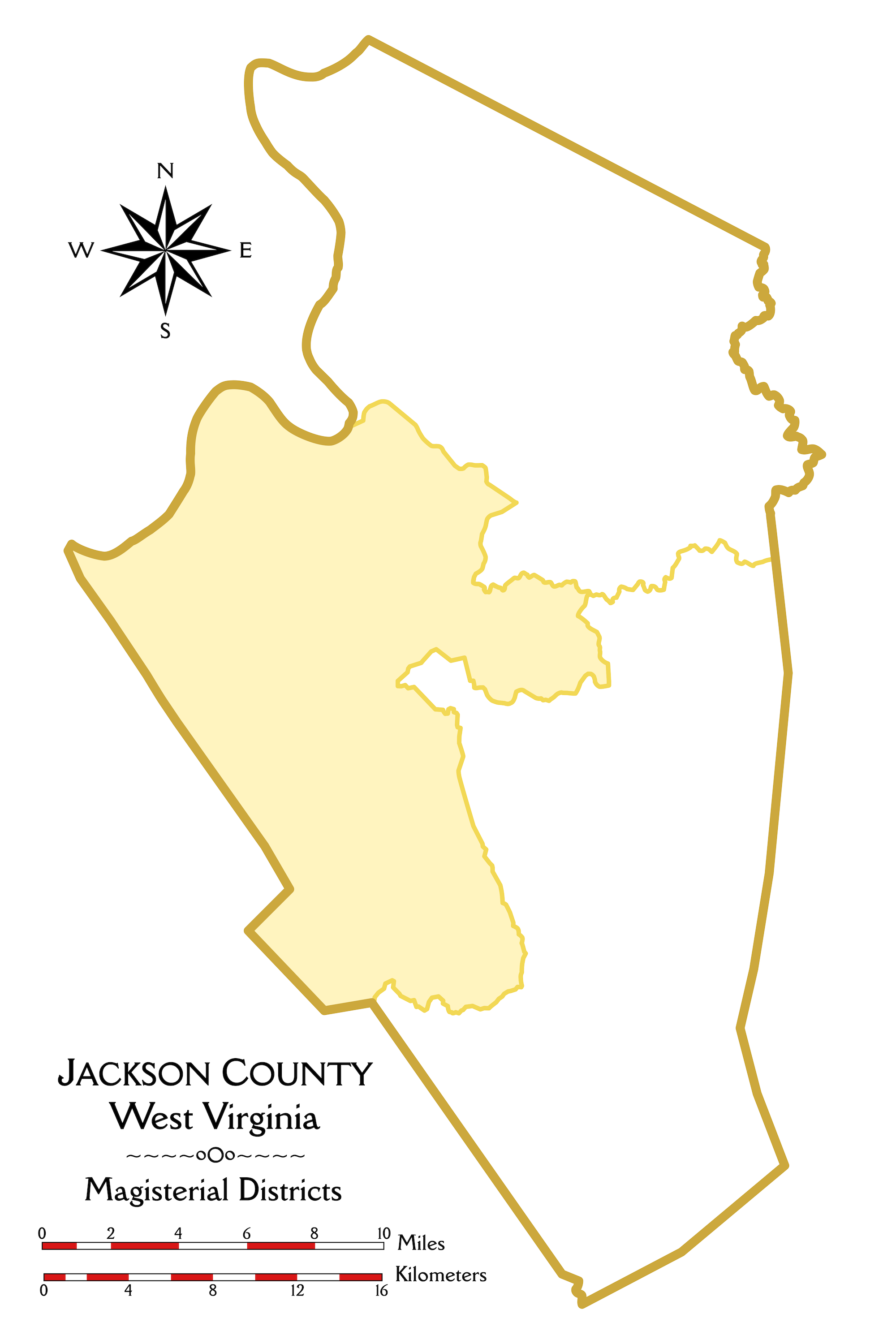
- Location of Western District in Jackson County
- Coordinates: 38°49′09″N 81°45′42″W
- Country: United States
- State: West Virginia
- County: Jackson
- Established: 1990s

Area
  - Total: 151.83 sq mi (393.2 km^{2})
  - Land: 148.72 sq mi (385.2 km^{2})
  - Water: 3.11 sq mi (8.1 km^{2})
- Elevation: 689 ft (210 m)

Population (2010)
  - Total: 10,576
  - Density: 70/sq mi (27/km^{2})
- Time zone: UTC-5 (Eastern (EST))
  - Summer (DST): UTC-4 (EDT)

The Western Magisterial District is one of three magisterial districts in Jackson County, West Virginia, United States. It was established during a process of redistricting undertaken in the 1990s. In 2010, 10,576 people lived in the district.

== Geography ==
The Western District occupies the southwestern portion of Jackson County. To the north and east, it is bounded by the Northern District of Jackson County, to the east and south by the Eastern District, to the south by Buffalo-Union District in Putnam County, to the southwest by Union and Cologne Districts in Mason County, and to the north and west by the Ohio River. Across the Ohio River are Letart and Lebanon Townships, in Meigs County, Ohio.

=== Streams ===
The principal streams in the Western District are Mill Creek, which with its numerous tributaries drains the central and southern portions of the county, and Sandy Creek, the lower course of which runs along the boundary between the Western and Northern Districts.

The upper waters of Mill Creek arise in western Roane County, and the main course of the creek is formed in the Eastern District, several miles above Ripley. Mill Creek enters the Western District as it leaves Ripley, and meanders westward through a broad valley, turning northwest below Angerona, and continuing to Ripley Landing, where it abruptly turns southwest just short of the Ohio River, and continues across the floodplain for a mile before joining the river at Millwood.

Mill Creek's main tributaries in the Western District include Sycamore Creek, which forks several times in the hills north of Ripley; Parchment Creek, which flows northward out of the southern part of the district; Cow Run, with its upper waters in eastern Mason County, flowing northeast into Mill Creek between Angerona and Cottageville; and Lick Run, which drains the hills east of Ripley Landing.

The upper course of Sandy Creek is largely within the Northern District, although its upper waters also extend into western Roane County. The creek enters the Western District at The Y, and winds northwest through the hills before emptying into the Ohio at Ravenswood. The lower course of Sandy Creek, between The Y and Ravenswood, is in the Western District, while Ravenswood and the mouth of the creek are in the Northern District. Sandy Creek's main tributary in the Western District is the Crooked Fork, which drains the hills between Ripley and Ravenswood.

Other important streams in the district include Little Mill Creek, which flows northeastward out of Mason County, then turns north above Millwood and enters the Ohio below the mouth of Big Mill Creek; and the headwaters of Thirteenmile Creek, which flows out of the hills around Rockcastle, then enters Mason County, where it winds through the hills until emptying into the Kanawha River at Leon.

=== Communities ===
There are no incorporated towns in the Western District, but there are several unincorporated villages, of which the largest are Cottageville and Evans. Angerona, Cottageville, Ripley Landing, and Millwood all lie on the waters of Mill Creek, while Evans is on Isaacs Run, a small tributary of Mill Creek above Angerona.

Other communities in the Western District include Pleasant View, along the Ohio River in the northern part of the district; Flatwoods and Hemlock, on the Crooked Fork of Sandy Creek; Sidneyville and Pleasant Hill, on the Left Fork of Sycamore Run; Danstown, Mount Moriah, Parchment Valley, and Given on Parchment Creek and its tributaries.

The village of Mount Alto is in the westernmost part of the county; Rockcastle is located on Thirteenmile Creek, in the southwestern part of the district; and Foster Chapel is in the hills north of Rockcastle and Given. A small portion of Ripley is within the boundaries of the Western District, although the main portion of the town is in the Eastern District. Similarly, Silverton, on Sandy Creek, lies on the boundary between the Northern and Western Districts, while Fairplain, on the Charleston Road south of Ripley, is on the boundary between the Eastern and Western Districts.

=== Roads ===
The main north–south routes through the district include West Virginia Route 2, County Road 21, and Interstate 77. Route 2 runs from Point Pleasant to Ravenswood; it enters Jackson County near Mount Alto, and follows the course of the Ohio River through the district, passing through Mount Alto, Millwood, Ripley Landing, and Pleasant View. County Road 21 forms most of the eastern boundary of the district, running between Charleston and Parkersburg, and passing through Fairplain, Ripley, and The Y. South of Ripley, it is known locally as the Charleston Road, while north of Ripley it becomes the Parkersburg Road. Interstate 77 also travels between Charleston and Parkersburg, but its course is further to the west; there are exits at Fairplain, Ripley, and Silverton.

Important east–west routes include U.S. Route 33, and West Virginia Routes 62, 87, and 331. Route 33 crosses the Ohio River at Ravenswood, and forms the northern boundary of the district to Silverton; the district line then continues from Silverton to The Y along Old West Virginia 56, meeting the Parkersburg Road at The Y, south of Sandyville. Route 62 runs along Mill Creek between Ripley and Ripley Landing, then follows the Ohio River past Millwood, and runs into the hills as far as Mount Alto, where it turns west and enters Mason County, continuing along the river to Point Pleasant. Route 331 runs between Mount Alto and Cottageville. Route 87 passes through Evans on its course from Chestnut and Baden in eastern Mason County to Route 62, west of Ripley.

== History ==
Historical population
| Census | Pop. | Note | %± |
|---|---|---|---|
| 2000 | 9,654 | | — |
| 2010 | 10,576 | | 9.6% |
| 2017 (est.) | 11,013 | | 4.1% |
United States Census Bureau, U.S. Decennial Census, 2000, 2010.

Until 1831, all of the territory that would become Jackson County was part of Mason, Kanawha, and Wood counties. All of the Eastern District was part of Mason County. After West Virginia was admitted to the Union in 1863, the counties were divided into civil townships, which were converted into magisterial districts in 1872. Jackson County was divided into five magisterial districts: Grant, Ravenswood, Ripley, Union, and Washington. The only major change to occur in the district boundaries prior to the 1990s occurred in 1866, when a trapezoidal section of Union District in Mason County, including the village of Rockcastle and the headwaters of Thirteenmile Creek, was transferred to Jackson County, and attached to Ripley District. Otherwise, the names and boundaries of the historic districts remained largely unchanged for over a hundred and twenty years.

In the 1990s, Jackson County was redistricted in order to equalize the area and population of its magisterial districts as nearly as possible. All of Union District was combined with the northwestern portion of Ripley District, and the southwestern corner of Ravenswood District, to form the Eastern Magisterial District. The western boundaries of the new district follow the lines of Union and Ripley Districts, but new boundaries were drawn separating the Eastern District from its neighbors in Jackson County. The boundary with the Northern District follows U.S. Route 35 and Old West Virginia 56 from the Ohio River to The Y, then runs south along the Parkersburg Road until it meets the original southern boundary of Ravenswood District. From there, the Eastern District continues eastward to the original boundary of Washington District, where it turns south until it reaches Mill Creek. At Mill Creek, the boundary runs westward along the creek, encircles the town of Ripley, nearly all of which is in the Eastern District, then runs south along the Charleston Road, Pleasant Valley Road, and Jim Ridge Road to the county line.

Because redistricting proved confusing with county records, the West Virginia Legislature provided for the original magisterial districts to continue in the form of tax districts, which continued to serve administrative functions other than the apportionment of county officials. The current magisterial districts are used for those functions requiring equal representation between the residents of the various district, and as such are currently the minor civil division of record for the United States Census Bureau.
