= Woodrum Lake Wildlife Management Area =

State Wildlife Management Area in Jackson County, West Virginia

- IUCN category V (protected landscape/seascape)
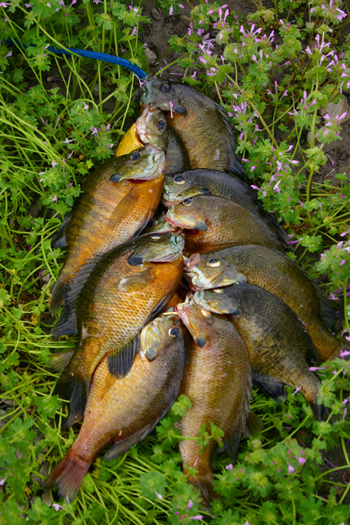
- Bluegill (Lepomis macrochirus) may be found at the Woodrum Lake WMA

- Location within West Virginia
- Location: Jackson, West Virginia, United States
- Coordinates: 38°37′18″N 81°34′53″W
- Area: 1,696 acres (6.86 km^{2})
- Elevation: 735 ft (224 m)
- Operator: Wildlife Resources Section, WV Division of Natural Resources

Woodrum Lake Wildlife Management Area, is located about 3 miles (4.8 km) east of Romance, West Virginia in Jackson County. Woodrum Lake WMA is located on 1,696 acres (686 ha) of hilly oak-hickory hardwood lots mixed with abandoned farmland.

Built in 1988 by the U.S. Soil Conservation Service to protect Middle Fork Creek, the 240 acre lake was drained in order to repair the dam and correct a lock mechanism jammed by a sunken log in 2005. Repaired, refilled and restocked, it is now again popular with bass and muskellunge as well as panfish (bluegill, crappie and catfish) anglers. Trout are not stocked. Trolling boats are permitted, with a maximum of 10 horsepower.

Deer, waterfowl and small game can also be hunted, with permit and seasonal restriction. Camping is not permitted.

Access to Woodrum Lake WMA is by County Route 42 (Romance-Advent Road) from Romance, or by County Route 19 from Kentuck.

== Hunting and Fishing ==
Hunting opportunities in the WMA include deer, grouse, rabbit, squirrel, turkey, and waterfowl.

Fishing opportunities in the 240-acre (97 ha) Woodrum Lake include largemouth and spotted bass, bluegill, crappie, muskellunge.

Camping is not available at the WMA.

== See also ==
- Animal conservation
- Hunting
- List of West Virginia wildlife management areas
