= Salt Hill (disambiguation) =

Salt Hill or Salthill may refer to:

- Salt Hill, a suburb of Slough, England
- Salthill, a seaside area of Galway, Ireland
- Salthill, a suburb of Dún Laoghaire, Ireland
- Salt Hill (New York), United States, a mountain in Westchester County
- Salt Hill, West Virginia, United States, an unincorporated community in Jackson County
