= Pleasant Hill, West Virginia =

Pleasant Hill, West Virginia may refer to the following communities in West Virginia:

- Pleasant Hill, Calhoun County, West Virginia
- Pleasant Hill, Jackson County, West Virginia
- Pleasant Hill, Wood County, West Virginia
