= Union District, Jackson County, West Virginia =

- Magisterial district
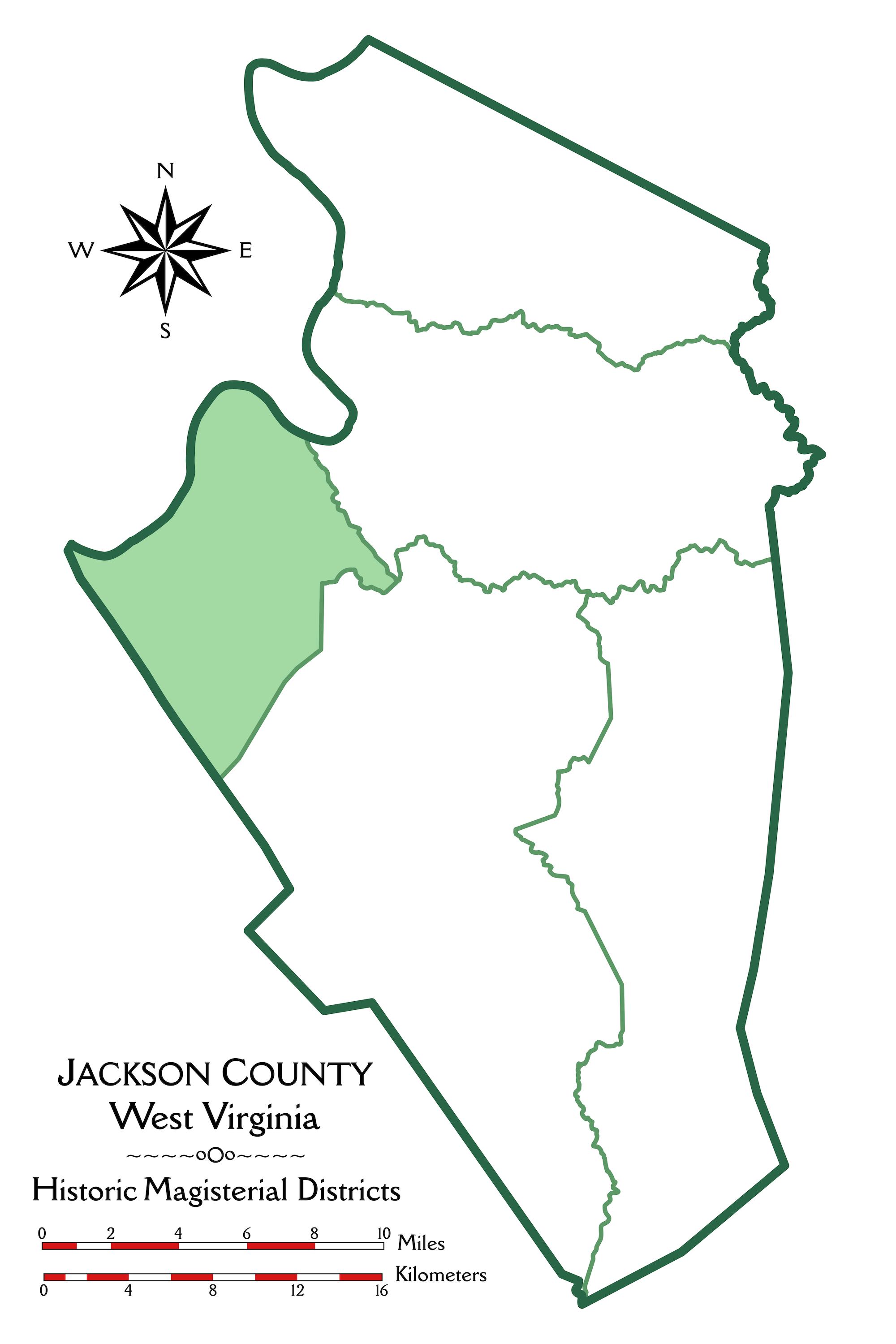
- Location of Union District in Jackson County
- Coordinates: 38°51′57″N 81°49′27″W
- Country: United States
- State: West Virginia
- County: Jackson
- Established: 1863

Area
  - Total: 49.90 sq mi (129.24 km^{2})
  - Land: 47.64 sq mi (123.39 km^{2})
  - Water: 2.26 sq mi (5.85 km^{2})

Population (2010)
  - Total: N/A
- Time zone: UTC-5 (Eastern (EST))
  - Summer (DST): UTC-4 (EDT)

Union District, formerly Union Magisterial District, is one of five historic magisterial districts in Jackson County, West Virginia, United States. The district was originally known as Hushan's Mills Township, one of five civil townships established in 1863, at the height of the Civil War; it was subsequently given the patriotic name of Union Township. In 1872, West Virginia's townships were converted into magisterial districts. When Jackson County was redistricted in the 1990s, the area of Union District was included in the new Western Magisterial District. However, the county's historic magisterial districts continue to exist in the form of tax districts, serving all of their former administrative functions except for the election of county officials.

== Geography ==
Union District is located in the westernmost portion of Jackson County. To the north, it is bounded by the Ohio River; to the northeast, by Ravenswood District; to the southeast, by Ripley District; and to the southwest by Cologne District in Mason County. Across the river to the north are Letart and Lebanon townships, in Meigs County, Ohio.

Although much of Union District is hilly, it also includes the most extensive and fertile bottomland in the county, both along the Ohio River, and along the lower course of Mill Creek. In the nineteenth century, Warth's Bottom in Union District was regarded as some of the finest agricultural land along the entire length of the Ohio. The district once included Towhead Island, an island in the Ohio River at the northern end of the district, opposite the mouth of Oldtown Creek in Meigs County. Towhead Island was approximately one thousand feet long in 1908, but is now submerged.

=== Streams ===
The main streams of Union District are Mill Creek and Little Mill Creek, both of which empty into the Ohio below Ripley Landing. The only other streams are Spring Creek, in the northern part of the district, which joins the Ohio about a mile above Ripley Landing; Cedar Run, the lower course of which forms the boundary with Ravenswood District; the upper waters of the Crooked Fork of Sandy Creek, which flow northward into Ravenswood District; and Toms Run, a small creek that flows into the Ohio a little less than a mile above the boundary with Mason County. Stedman Run and Pole Run are tributaries of Cedar Run that lie entirely within Ravenswood District.

Mill Creek, sometimes called "Big" Mill Creek, to distinguish it from its neighbor, Little Mill Creek, as well as a tributary of the same name, is the largest and most extensive stream in Jackson County. Its upper waters extend eastward across Ripley and Washington Districts, and into the western portions of Roane County, and some of the tributaries along its lower course extend into Mason County. The main branch of the creek enters Union District from the east, about four miles below the town of Ripley, and flows northwest through the district, passing the villages of Angerona, Cottageville, and Ripley Landing. Here Mill Creek turns west after exiting the hills, before entering the Ohio River at Millwood.

Within Union District, Mill Creek is met by Loglick Run, coming from the north about two miles below Angerona; then Cow Run, flowing from the southwest; both the right and left forks of Cow Run extend into Cologne District in Mason County. Bar Run enters Mill Creek from the west about a mile above Cottageville. At Cottageville, Mill Creek is joined by Falls Run, coming from the east; Sugar Run is a tributary of Falls Run. As it leaves the hills above Ripley Landing, Mill Creek is met by Lick Run, which drains much of the center portion of the district, coming from the northeast. The creek then flows northwest toward the Ohio, making a sharp bend to the southeast just shy of the river bank, then turns southwest toward Millwood, where it joins the Ohio just above the mouth of Little Mill Creek.

Little Mill Creek—which must be distinguished from another Little Mill Creek, a tributary of Big Mill Creek, in Ripley and Washington Districts—drains the western portion of Union District. Its upper course flows out of a deep valley northwest of Baden in Mason County, turning eastward just before it enters Jackson County; its main tributary, the Right Fork, also known as Huff Run, is in the eastern portion of Cologne District, due north of Baden. Little Mill Creek flows east through the hills above Millwood, then turns north, entering the Ohio at Millwood, just below the mouth of Big Mill Creek.

=== Communities ===
There are no incorporated towns in Union District, but there are several unincorporated communities, of which the largest are Cottageville, Flatwoods, Millwood, and Ripley Landing. Cottageville, Millwood, and Ripley Landing all lie along the course of Mill Creek, as does the village of Angerona; Flatwoods is in the eastern part of the district, on the upper waters of the Crooked Fork of Sandy Creek.

Other communities in Union District include Mount Alto, in the hills in the western part of the district; Evergreen Hills, in the hills west of Cottageville; Estar, on the Ohio River bottom just above Ripley Landing; Hills Crossing, along the Ohio River at the northern end of the district; and Pleasant View, on the Ohio about half a mile below the boundary with Ravenswood District.

Former villages of Union District include Huntsville, on the right fork of Cow Run; School House, on the Ohio River half a mile below Millwood; and Willow Grove, on the Ohio River, about three miles above Ripley Landing.

=== Roads and transportation ===
The main highways in Union District are West Virginia Route 2, West Virginia Route 62, and West Virginia Route 331. Route 2 runs through the district on its way from Point Pleasant to Ravenswood, passing through Mount Alto, Millwood, and Ripley Landing. Route 62 follows the course of Mill Creek between Ripley Landing and Ripley, passing through Cottageville; at Ripley Landing, it joins Route 2, and travels westward through Millwood to Mount Alto, where it turns westward and follows the course of the Ohio River through the northern part of Mason County, until it also reaches Point Pleasant. Route 331 runs from the junction of Routes 2 and 62 at Mount Alto, westward to Cottageville, where it rejoins Route 62.

A railroad runs along the Ohio River through Union District, on its way between Huntington and Parkersburg. Formerly part of the Baltimore and Ohio Railroad, the line is now part of CSX. There are no bridges over the Ohio in Union District; but until the twentieth century there were ferries at Millwood and Willow Grove.

== History ==
Historical population
Census	Pop.	Note	%±
1870	1,830		—
1880	2,254		23.2%
1890	2,442		8.3%
1900	2,718		11.3%
1910	2,326		−14.4%
1920	2,069		−11.0%
1930	1,689		−18.4%
1940	1,617		−4.3%
1950	1,450		−10.3%
1960	1,664		14.8%
1970	2,396		44.0%
1980	2,718		13.4%
1990	3,056		12.4%
United States Census Bureau, U.S. Decennial Census, 1870–1990.

The first European settlers in Jackson County were probably William Hannaman and Benjamin Cox, who came to what is now Union District in May 1796. James McDade built a cabin nearby around the same time, but he was an "Indian scout", and did not settle permanently on his land for several years. The Treaty of Greenville had been signed in December 1795, ceding Indian claims to the Ohio Valley and much of the land beyond to the United States. The signing of the treaty was the event that convinced many pioneers to begin moving westward, although occasional Indian incursions east of the Ohio continued for a few years. About 1797, two hunters from Belleville, by the names of Coleman and Savney, were shot by Indians while camped at the present site of Cottageville. Coleman was killed, but Savney, though wounded, managed to escape.

The first settler child born in the district was a son of William Hannaman, in 1797. The district's first grist mill was a hand-powered mill established by a man named Hushan in 1799. The next settlers to arrive in Union District were Joseph Parsons, Cornelius King, and John Douglas in 1800; they were followed by many more in the first decade of the nineteenth century. In 1802, Benjamin Wright built a horse-powered grist mill at the site of Cottageville. His son-in-law, John Brown, established the county's first sawmill nearby in 1803. The same year saw the organization of a Methodist congregation, led by a preacher named Noah, at the house of Joseph Parsons.

The first settlers on Little Mill Creek were Joseph Hall and Isaac Hide, who came to the area in 1806; the first road in the district was laid out by Jackson Smith between the Ohio River and the current site of Ripley. 1806 saw a log schoolhouse built in Union District; the following year, Andrew Hoschar (Note: His name is given as "Hushan", like the miller, in Hardesty's; elsewhere as "Hushaw", and other spellings, but the schoolmaster's name was apparently "Hoschar". Whether he or a relative of his was the same as the miller is unclear.) took up residence as schoolmaster, leading a class of fifteen pupils.

Until the establishment of Jackson County in 1831, all of Union District lay within the boundaries of Mason County. Soon after the new county's formation, the United States Post Office Department began appointing postmasters for the area. Union District's first post office was established in 1834, at "Wright's Mills", now Cottageville, with David Woodruff as postmaster.

On July 31, 1863, the West Virginia Legislature passed an act requiring the division of the counties into civil townships. Section five of the bill appointed George L. Kennedy, John Johnson, Robert R. Riley, Abraham Slaughter, and George Click to establish Jackson County's townships. Union, originally called "Hushan's Mills", was one of the five original townships of Jackson County. The original purpose of the townships was to provide for local government, as well as local control over revenue and the newly created system of free public schools. However, the rural nature of the state proved an impediment to participation in township government, and revenues fell far below expectations. In 1872, the townships were converted into magisterial districts, serving various administrative purposes, but having no governmental function.

The names and boundaries of Jackson County's magisterial districts remained relatively unchanged until the 1990s, when the county was redistricted in order to equalize the area and population of its magisterial districts as nearly as possible. All of Union District, the western portion of Ripley District, and part of southwestern Ravenswood District were included in the new Western Magisterial District. However, redistricting in a number of counties created confusion with land and tax records, so the legislature provided for the establishment of tax districts, following the lines of the historic magisterial districts, and serving all administrative functions other than the apportionment of county officials. As a result, Union District remains an administrative unit of Jackson County, (Note: Because the magisterial districts were redrawn in order to equalize voter representation, the United States Census Bureau recognizes them as West Virginia's minor civil division, and thus no longer collects population statistics for Union District.) although it is no longer one of the magisterial districts.

Like the rest of Jackson County, Union District was heavily forested when the first settlers arrived, and began clearing land for agriculture. Beginning in the latter part of the nineteenth century, the county was heavily logged to produce lumber, barrel staves, and railroad ties. Hardesty's reports that by 1883, the timber along the bottomlands of the Ohio River and Mill Creek was nearly exhausted, but in the hills there remained "considerable quantities of the various kinds of oak, pine, poplar, and hickory".
