= Ravenswood District, Jackson County, West Virginia =

- Magisterial district
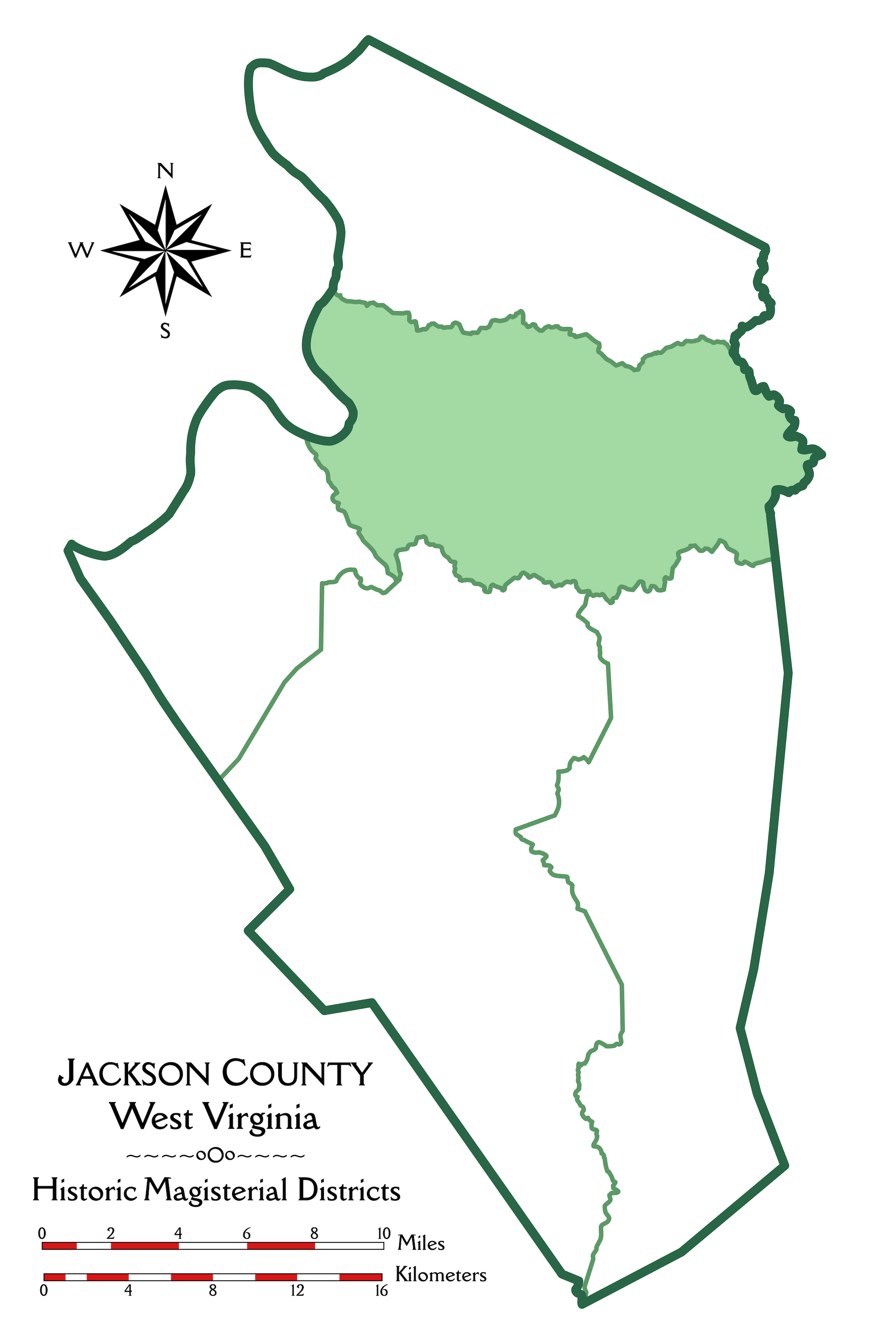
- Location of Ravenswood District in Jackson County
- Coordinates: 38°55′14″N 81°38′54″W
- Country: United States
- State: West Virginia
- County: Jackson
- Established: 1863
- Named for: Town of Ravenswood

Area
  - Total: 90.87 sq mi (235.36 km^{2})
  - Land: 89.81 sq mi (232.61 km^{2})
  - Water: 1.06 sq mi (2.75 km^{2})

Population (2010)
  - Total: N/A
- Time zone: UTC-5 (Eastern (EST))
  - Summer (DST): UTC-4 (EDT)

Ravenswood District, formerly Ravenswood Magisterial District, is one of five historic magisterial districts in Jackson County, West Virginia, United States. The district was originally known as Gilmore Township, one of five civil townships established in 1863; the name officially became "Ravenswood" in 1871, and Jackson County's townships were converted into magisterial districts in 1872. When Jackson County was redistricted in the 1990s, the area of Ravenswood District was divided between the new Northern and Western Magisterial Districts. However, the county's historic magisterial districts continue to exist in the form of tax districts, serving all of their former administrative functions except for the election of county officials.

== Geography ==
Ravenswood District is one of two historic magisterial districts in the northern part of Jackson County. To the north, it is bounded by Grant District, to the east by Reedy District in Wirt County and Reedy District in Roane County; to the south by Washington, Ripley, and Union Districts, the three southern districts of Jackson County, and to the west by the northern portion of the Great Bend of the Ohio River. Across the river is Lebanon Township, in Meigs County, Ohio.

Most of Ravenswood District is hilly, but there are bottomlands along the Ohio River and Sandy Creek. Hardesty's describes the district as containing "some of the best farming lands in the [s]tate; the soil on the river bottoms is sandy, while that of the hills is for the most part red clay."

=== Streams ===
The main stream in Ravenswood District is Sandy Creek, occasionally referred to as "Big" Sandy Creek, to distinguish it from Little Sandy Creek in Grant District. The creek and its tributaries drain nearly the entire district, and empties into the Ohio River at Ravenswood. The main course divides into two forks just below Sandyville, about ten miles southeast of Ravenswood. The upper waters of the Right Fork arise in the Reedy District of Roane County, and this branch traverses the central portion of Ravenswood District from east to west. The Left Fork arises in Tucker District, Wirt County, and adjoining portions of Steele District, in Wood County, and flows through Grant District for much of its length.

In its upper course, the Right Fork of Sandy Creek meets with Patterson Run, Buck Run, and Hartley Run, all of which join Sandy Creek in Roane County, although the latter two flow northeast out of Ravenswood District. At Liverpool, just west of the Roane County line, Sandy meets with the Brushy Fork, flowing westward from Sandy Summit in Roane County. From Liverpool, the Right Fork turns westward, meeting with Cabin Run, Rush Run, Fallentimber Run, and Washburn Run, all coming from the north; Bear Run is a tributary of Fallentimber. The creek then meets with Coon Run, flowing from the south; at Duncan the stream is joined by Warfield Run, coming from the north, and Trap Run, from the south. Boggess Run flows southward into Sandy just below Meadowdale Church; Biglick Run flows northwest into the creek at the village of Meadowdale; then Lynncamp Run, Low Gap Run, Burgess Run, and Island Run, the last of which joins the Right Fork just below the village of Murray; Bens Run is a tributary of Lynncamp, flowing out of a hollow below Tar Hill.

The Left Fork of Sandy Creek meets a number of tributaries in Grant District; just after crossing into Ravenswood District, it meets with Nesselroad Run, the majority of which is also in Grant; just above the juncture, Nesselroad is joined by another Coon Run, which lies entirely within Ravenswood District. The next tributary to join the Left Fork is Drift Run, which flows east and south out of the hills above the village of Drift Run. Just above Odaville, the creek is joined by the Turkey Fork, which flows westward out of the hills below Garfield, on the Wirt County line. Along its course, the Turkey Fork is joined by Lisez Run, Camp Run, Five Mile Run, Horner Run, the Peter Fork, and Barnes Run. Below Odaville, the Left Fork of Sandy meets with the Sarvis Fork, also flowing from the east, and the Copper Fork coming from the north; the latter flows out of the hollows in the central part of the district, where it is joined by the Squirrel Lick, then continues past the village of New Era, joining the Left Fork just above Sandyville.

In its lower course, Sandy Creek is met by Beatty Run, flowing southeast out of the hills above Crow Summit; the Trace Fork, flowing northwest out of the southern part of the district; Mud Run, flowing from the south, Cherrycamp Run, from the southwest; and Wheaton Run, from the north; Bucket Run is a tributary of the Trace Fork. The Crooked Fork arises out of the hills east of Flatwoods, in Union District, then flows northeast into Ravenswood District, meeting Briar Run at Hemlock; it is then joined by the Dry Fork and Cockle Run, before joining Sandy Creek between Varner and Nuzums. At Silverton, the main branch of the creek is joined by the Straight Fork, flowing southwest out of the hills above Wilding, and Browning Run, flowing from the south. Jackson Run, Shockey Run, and Bennett Run are tributaries of the Straight Fork. Big Run joins Sandy Creek just above the beginning of the Polecat Bend. Just above Ravenswood, the creek is joined by Lick Run, flowing out of the hills east of the town.

The only other streams in Ravenswood District are Turkey Run, which flows out of the hills north of Ravenswood, and joins the Ohio River just west of the town; Bar Run, a small creek that flows into the Ohio opposite the southern tip of Lebanon Township, and Cedar Run, which flows northward out of the hills below Flatwoods in Union District, and in its lower course forms part of the boundary between Union and Ravenswood Districts; Stedman Run and Pole Run, both in Ravenswood District, are tributaries of Cedar Run.

=== Communities ===
The city of Ravenswood is the only incorporated settlement in the district, and together with Ripley, one of only two in Jackson County. It is the largest city in Jackson County, and with a population estimated at 3,668 in 2018, the largest city in on the Ohio River between Huntington and Parkersburg. The town was laid out in 1836 by the heirs of George Washington, who had surveyed and patented the land before the Revolution, and has consistently been the most populous town in the county since West Virginia achieved statehood in 1863, except for 1950, when it was briefly surpassed by Ripley.

Although there are no other incorporated towns in Ravenswood District, there are a number of unincorporated communities, spread out along the various branches of Sandy Creek. Along the main course, below the forks of Sandy, are Silverton, Nuzums, Varner, and The Y. Wilding is located at the headwaters of the Straight Fork, while Crow Summit lies on Beatty Run. Ascending the Right Fork of Sandy Creek are Murray, Jones Crossing, Meadowdale, Duncan, Le Roy, and Liverpool. Sandyville lies a short distance above the mouth of the Left Fork of Sandy, with New Era nearby at the mouth of the Copper Fork; Independence is nestled in a hollow on the south side of Copper Fork. Further up the Left Fork are Odaville and Drift Run. Garfield is on the county line, above the headwaters of the Turkey Fork.

=== Roads and transportation ===
The main road along the Ohio River in Ravenswood District is divided between West Virginia Route 2, coming north from Point Pleasant to Ravenswood, and West Virginia Route 68, continuing northward to Parkersburg. A second north-to-south route, County Road 21, known locally as "Parkersburg Road", travels through the center of the district, running from Sandyville north to Parkersburg, following the Left Fork of Sandy Creek, and southward to Ripley.

The main east–west road begins as U.S. Route 33, coming from Ohio and crossing the river at Ravenswood; there it joins West Virginia 2, and continues to Silverton, where it meets Interstate 77. The road then continues eastward as "Old West Virginia 56", which joins the Parkersburg Road just south of Sandyville. From Sandyville, Liverpool Road follows the course of the Right Fork of Sandy to Liverpool, and thence into Roane County, continuing to Reedy. County Road 7, known locally as "Turkey Fork Road", follows the course of the Turkey Fork from the Parkersburg Road to Garfield, and continues to Peewee and Palestine in Wirt County.

Interstate 77 runs north and south through the eastern part of the district; however, the only interchange is at Silverton.

A railroad runs along the Ohio River between Point Pleasant and Parkersburg, passing through Ravenswood along the way. Formerly part of the Baltimore and Ohio Railroad, it is now owned by CSX Transportation.

The U.S. Route 33 bridge that crosses the river at Ravenswood is the only River crossing in the county, and the only bridge over the Ohio between Mason City and the U.S. Route 50 bridge near Parkersburg. Until the twentieth century, a ferry carried passengers across the river at Ravenswood.

== History ==
Historical population
Census	Pop.	Note	%±
1870	2,169		—
1880	3,805		75.4%
1890	4,830		26.9%
1900	5,487		13.6%
1910	4,843		−11.7%
1920	4,463		−7.8%
1930	4,208		−5.7%
1940	4,209		0.0%
1950	4,058		−3.6%
1960	6,693		64.9%
1970	7,731		15.5%
1980	8,759		13.3%
1990	8,405		−4.0%
United States Census Bureau, U.S. Decennial Census, 1870–1990.

The Ohio river bottom at Ravenswood was first surveyed by George Washington and William Crawford in 1772. The following year, Washington patented a tract of 1,450 acres, including the future site of the town, but the Revolution and threat of Indian warfare forestalled settlement of the area for the remainder of the eighteenth century.

The first European settlers in Ravenswood District arrived about 1808, when most of Jackson County was still part of Mason and Wood Counties. The site of Ravenswood and the westward portion of the district lay in Mason County, south of the line dividing Mason from Wood. The first cabin was built at the mouth of Sandy Creek by John Nesselrode, while Lawrence Lane, who arrived about the same time, built the first cabin on the north side of the creek, where the town of Ravenswood was later founded. Other pioneers of the district included William Anderson, who settled about two miles south of Sandy Creek; Eli Gandee, who settled on Sandy Creek about three miles above its mouth; James Daugherty, who settled on the river bottom near Ravenswood, and James Stanley, who settled just below the mouth of Sandy Creek. In 1820, Daniel Beatty became the district's first schoolmaster, teaching from a log cabin built on Sandy Creek two years earlier. Numerous other settlers joined these during the early decades of the nineteenth century.

Lawrence Lane and William Bailey cleared forty acres at the future site of Ravenswood in 1810, hoping to establish a claim to the land, which had hitherto gone undeveloped. However, in 1812 the Washington heirs had them ejected, and had the land resurveyed and subdivided. For a number of years the lots were rented to various settlers, including Bartholomew Fleming, who established a ferry across the Ohio River by 1831, the same year that Jackson County was formed from portions of Mason, Wood, and Kanawha Counties. For many years, Fleming sold cord wood to steamboats on the Ohio River; he would later be one of the first merchants of the town of Ravenswood, and the first municipal elections were held at his house.

The district's first post office was established at the site of Ravenswood in 1833, under the name of "Sandy"; Warren Reed was the first postmaster. In 1836, two of the Washington heirs, Henrietta Harning Fitzhugh and Lucy Fitzhugh Payne, moved to the area with their families, and began laying out lots for the site of a town. Payne intended for the town to be named "Ravensworth", but due to an engraving error in the map, it became known as "Ravenswood" instead. In 1837, Henry Fitzhugh, the husband of Henrietta Fitzhugh, built the district's first sawmill in 1837; the following year, he built the district's first grist mill as an addition to the sawmill.

On July 31, 1863, shortly after West Virginia was admitted to the Union, the West Virginia Legislature passed an act requiring the division of the counties into civil townships. Section five of the bill appointed George L. Kennedy, John Johnson, Robert R. Riley, Abraham Slaughter, and George Click to establish Jackson County's townships. Gilmore, as the district was named until 1871, was one of the five original townships of Jackson County. The original purpose of the townships was to provide for local government, as well as local control over revenue and the newly created system of free public schools. However, the rural nature of the state proved an impediment to participation in township government, and revenues fell far below expectations. In 1872, the townships were converted into magisterial districts, serving various administrative purposes, but having no governmental function.

The names and boundaries of Jackson County's magisterial districts remained relatively unchanged from 1872 until the 1990s, when the county was redistricted in order to equalize the area and population of its magisterial districts as nearly as possible. Most of Ravenswood District was combined with Grant District to form the new Northern Magisterial District; the southwestern part of the district, south of Ravenswood, was combined with Union District and the western part of Ripley District, excluding the town of Ripley, to form the Western Magisterial District. However, redistricting in a number of counties created confusion with land and tax records, so the legislature provided for the establishment of tax districts, following the lines of the historic magisterial districts, and serving all administrative functions other than the apportionment of county officials. As a result, Ravenswood District remains an administrative unit of Jackson County, (Note: Because the magisterial districts were redrawn in order to equalize voter representation, the United States Census Bureau recognizes them as West Virginia's minor civil division, and thus no longer collects population statistics for Ravenswood District.) although it is no longer one of the magisterial districts.
