= Mill Creek (western West Virginia) =

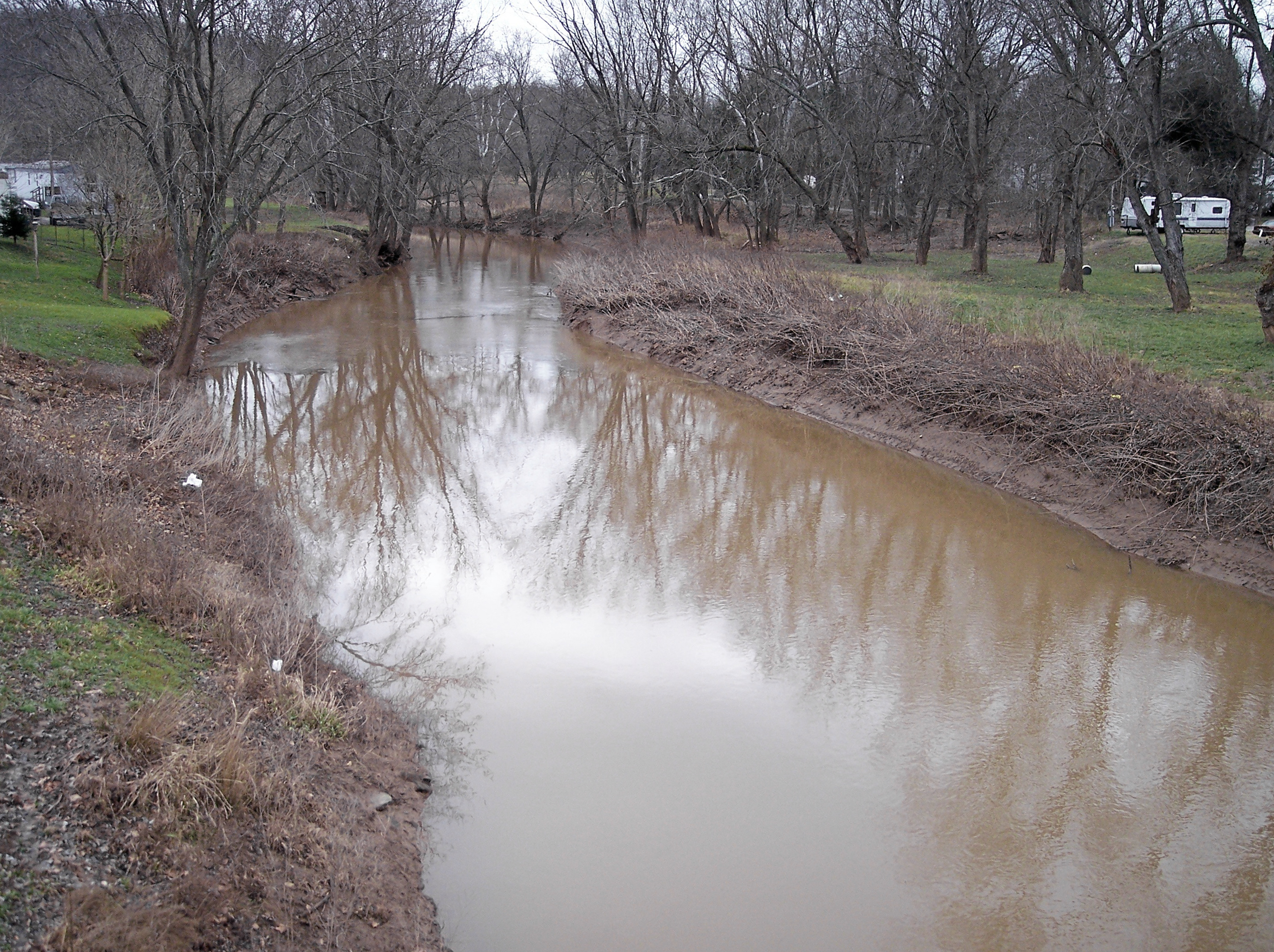
- Mill Creek in Ripley in 2007

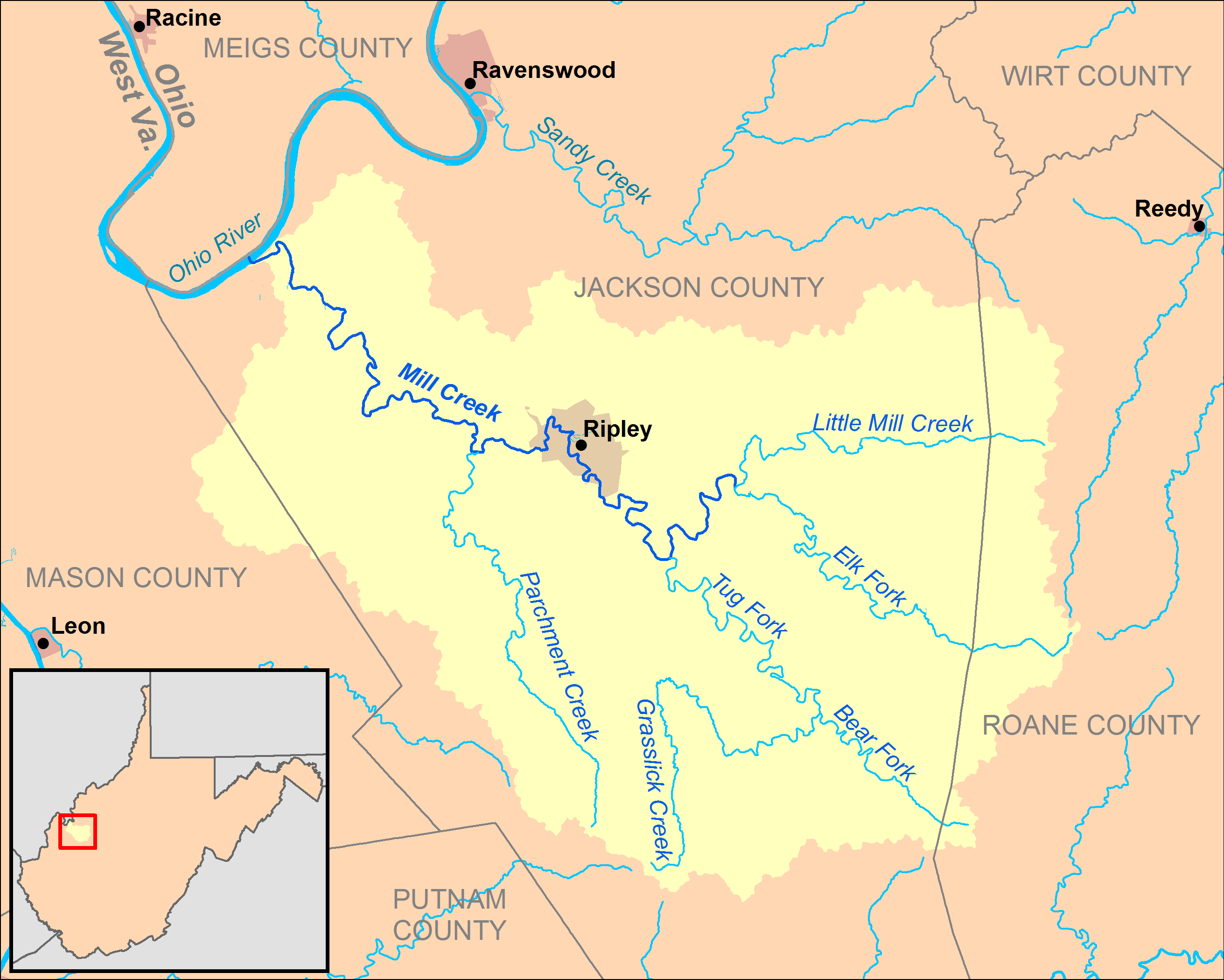
- Map of Mill Creek and its watershed

Location
- Country: United States
- State: West Virginia

Physical characteristics
- Source: Elk Fork
  - location: western Roane County
  - coordinates: 38°45′18″N 81°28′55″W
  - length: 15.4 miles (24.8 km)
  - elevation: 1,021 ft (311 m)
- 2nd source: Little Mill Creek
  - location: northwestern Roane County
  - coordinates: 38°49′15″N 81°29′36″W
  - length: 11.1 miles (17.9 km)
  - elevation: 976 ft (297 m)
- Source confluence
  - location: east of Ripley
  - coordinates: 38°48′18″N 81°38′19″W
  - elevation: 610 ft (190 m)
- Mouth: Ohio River
  - location: Millwood
  - coordinates: 38°53′04″N 81°51′43″W
  - elevation: 554 ft (169 m)
- Length: 29.4 mi (47.3 km)
- Basin size: 234 sq mi (610 km^{2})

Basin features
- Tributaries
  - left: Tug Fork

Mill Creek is a tributary of the Ohio River, 29.4 miles (47.3 km) long, in western West Virginia in the United States. Via the Ohio, it is part of the watershed of the Mississippi River, draining an area of 234 square miles (610 km^{2}) on the unglaciated portion of the Allegheny Plateau. According to the Geographic Names Information System, it has also been known historically as Big Mill Creek.

Mill Creek is formed approximately 4 miles (6.4 km) east of the city of Ripley in central Jackson County by the confluence of streams known as the Elk Fork and Little Mill Creek. The Elk Fork, 15.4 miles (24.8 km) long, rises in western Roane County and flows generally northwestward. Little Mill Creek, 11.1 miles (17.9 km) long, rises in northwestern Roane County and flows generally westward. Shortly downstream of their confluence, Mill Creek collects an 11.9-mile (19.2 km) long tributary known as the Tug Fork, which is formed in southern Jackson County by the confluence of the Bear Fork and Grasslick Creek, and flows northwestward, past the community of Statts Mills, joining Mill Creek from the south.

Mill Creek flows generally west-northwestward in a winding course through central and western Jackson County, through the city of Ripley, which may have been named for Harry Ripley, a traveling preacher said to have drowned in the creek in 1830. Downstream of Ripley, the stream passes through a broad valley in the vicinity of the community of Cottageville and flows into the Ohio River at the community of Millwood. Approximately the lowermost 6 miles (9.7 km) of the stream consists of backwater caused by damming of the Ohio. A commercial port facility is located on the creek near its mouth, handling limestone, sand, gravel, aluminum, and salt.

According to the West Virginia Department of Environmental Protection, approximately 74% of the Mill Creek watershed is forested, mainly deciduous. Approximately 25% is used for agriculture and pasture, and less than 1% is urban.

== See also ==
- List of West Virginia rivers
- Staats Mill Covered Bridge
- Sarvis Fork Covered Bridge
