= Parchment (disambiguation) =

Parchment is a thin material most often used as pages of a book or manuscript.

Parchment may also refer to:

== People ==
- Brenton Parchment (born 1982), Jamaican cricketer
- Cearah Parchment (born 2007), Canadian basketball player
- Hansle Parchment (born 1990), Jamaican athlete
- Rebecca Parchment (born 1982), Caymanian beauty pageant winner

== Other uses ==
- Parchment paper, used in baking
- Parchment, Michigan, a small city in the United States
- Parchment Creek, West Virginia, United States
- Parchment Housing Group, now part of The Guinness Partnership, a British charity providing affordable housing
- Parchment, Inc., a digital credential service; see Matthew Pittinsky, CEO
