= Louther, West Virginia =

- Unincorporated community
- Location within West Virginia Location within the United States
- Coordinates: 38°47′48″N 81°32′58″W
- Country: United States
- State: West Virginia
- County: Jackson
- Elevation: 689 ft (210 m)
- Time zone: UTC-5 (Eastern (EST))
  - Summer (DST): UTC-4 (EDT)
- Area codes: 304 & 681
- GNIS feature ID: 1549799

Louther is an unincorporated community in Jackson County, West Virginia, United States. Louther is located on County Highway 28 in the Frozen Camp Wildlife Management Area, 8.8 miles (14.2 km) east of Ripley. Louther once had a post office, which is now closed.
