= Parchment Valley, West Virginia =

- Unincorporated community
- Location within West Virginia Location within the United States
- Coordinates: 38°46′19″N 81°44′13″W
- Country: United States
- State: West Virginia
- County: Jackson
- Elevation: 614 ft (187 m)
- Time zone: UTC-5 (Eastern (EST))
  - Summer (DST): UTC-4 (EDT)
- Area codes: 304 & 681
- GNIS feature ID: 1555303

Parchment Valley is an unincorporated community in Jackson County, West Virginia, United States. Parchment Valley is located at the junction of County Routes 15 and 30, 3.5 miles (5.6 km) south-southwest of Ripley. Parchment Valley once had a post office, which is now closed.

Parchment Valley most likely takes its name from nearby Parchment Creek.
