= Frozen Camp Wildlife Management Area =

State Wildlife Management Area in Jackson County, West Virginia

- IUCN category V (protected landscape/seascape)
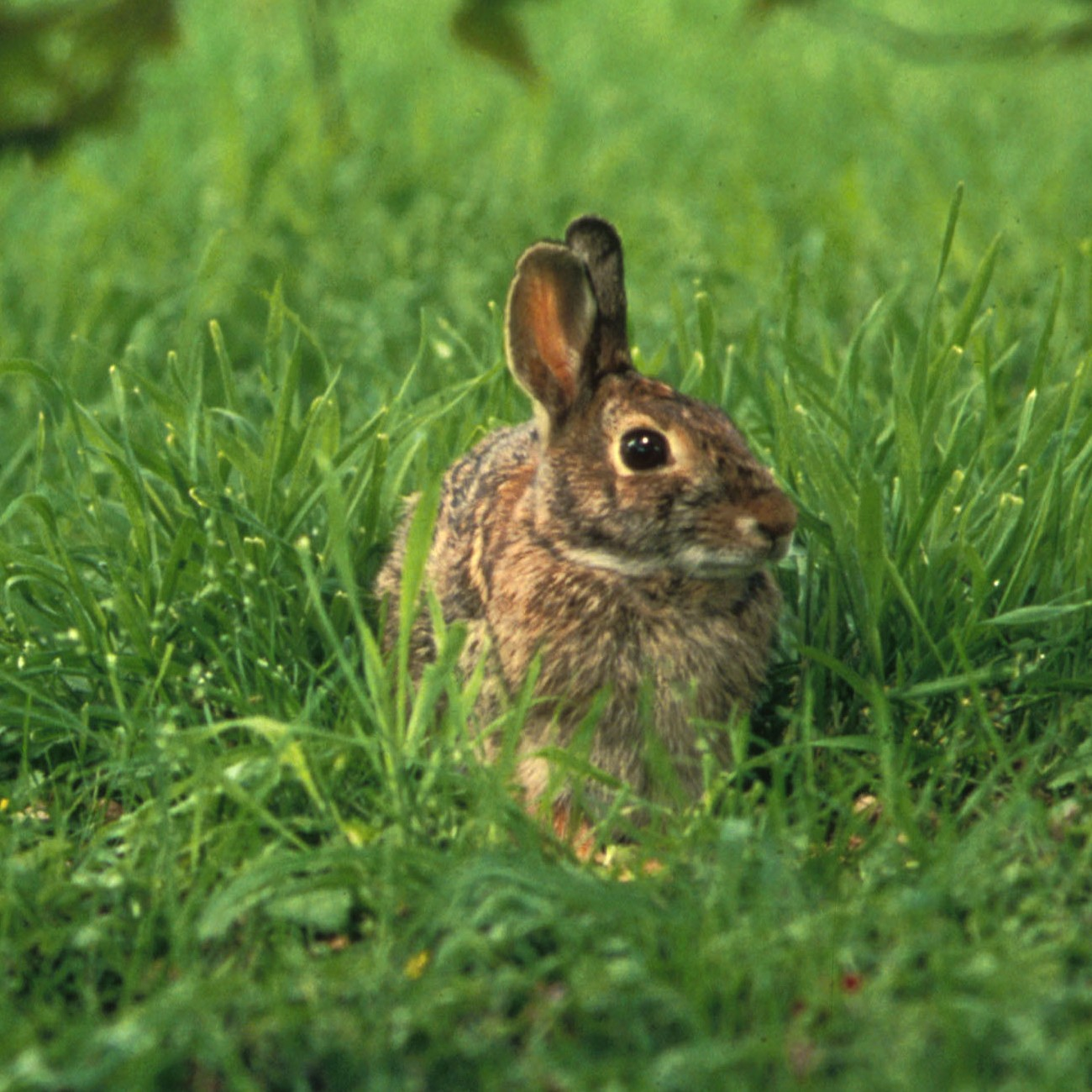
- The Eastern Cottontail (Sylvilagus floridanus) may be found in the Frozen Camp WMA

- Location within West Virginia
- Location: Jackson, West Virginia, United States
- Coordinates: 38°48′05″N 81°33′20″W
- Area: 2,587 acres (10.47 km^{2})
- Elevation: 670 ft (200 m)
- Operator: Wildlife Resources Section, WVDNR

Frozen Camp Wildlife Management Area is located on 2,587 acres (1,047 ha) in Jackson County near Ripley, West Virginia. The hilly terrain is mostly covered with second-growth mixed hardwoods, with some open creek bottoms and ridgetops.

== Hunting and fishing ==
Fishing opportunities are available in both the 22-acre (8.9 ha) Left Fork Lake and the 20-acre (8.1 ha) Right Fork Lake for largemouth bass, bluegill, and channel catfish. Available hunting can include deer, rabbit, grouse, squirrel, turkey and waterfowl.

Boating is permitted (electric motors only) on both of the small lakes. A 200-yard (180 m) shooting range is located on the WMA. Camping is prohibited at Frozen Camp WMA land.

== See also ==
- Animal conservation
- Fishing
- Hunting
- List of West Virginia wildlife management areas
