= Plum Orchard, West Virginia =

- Unincorporated community
- Location within West Virginia Location within the United States
- Coordinates: 38°42′19″N 81°37′36″W
- Country: United States
- State: West Virginia
- County: Jackson
- Elevation: 732 ft (223 m)
- Time zone: UTC-5 (Eastern (EST))
  - Summer (DST): UTC-4 (EDT)
- Area codes: 304 & 681
- GNIS feature ID: 1555377

Plum Orchard is an unincorporated community in Jackson County, West Virginia, United States. Plum Orchard is located on County Highway 34/14, 9 miles (14 km) south-southeast of Ripley. Plum Orchard once had a post office, which is now closed.
