= Marshall, West Virginia =

- Unincorporated community
- Location within West Virginia Location within the United States
- Coordinates: 38°49′29″N 81°32′09″W
- Country: United States
- State: West Virginia
- County: Jackson
- Elevation: 679 ft (207 m)
- Time zone: UTC-5 (Eastern (EST))
  - Summer (DST): UTC-4 (EDT)
- Area codes: 304 & 681
- GNIS feature ID: 1542793

Marshall is an unincorporated community in Jackson County, West Virginia, United States. Marshall is located on U.S. Route 33 and Little Mill Creek, 9.5 miles (15.3 km) east of Ripley.
