= Salt Hill, West Virginia =

- Unincorporated community
- Location within West Virginia Location within the United States
- Coordinates: 38°46′39″N 81°41′6″W
- Country: United States
- State: West Virginia
- County: Jackson
- Elevation: 925 ft (282 m)
- Time zone: UTC-5 (Eastern (EST))
  - Summer (DST): UTC-4 (EDT)
- GNIS ID: 1555556

Salt Hill is an unincorporated community in Jackson County, West Virginia, United States.
