= Huntsville, West Virginia =

- Former settlement
- Location within West Virginia Location within the United States
- Coordinates: 38°49′53″N 81°50′24″W
- Country: United States
- State: West Virginia
- County: Jackson
- Elevation: 597 ft (182 m)
- Time zone: UTC-5 (Eastern (EST))
  - Summer (DST): UTC-4 (EDT)
- GNIS ID: 1559955

Huntsville is a former community in Jackson County, West Virginia.
