= Salt Hill (New York) =

Mountain in Westchester County, New York, United States

- Location within New York Adirondack Park Location within the United States

Highest point
- Elevation: 699 feet (213 m)
- Coordinates: 41°14′52″N 73°51′36″W

Geography
- Location: SE of Peekskill, Westchester County, New York, U.S.
- Topo map: USGS Ossining

Salt Hill is a 699-foot-tall (213 m) mountain in the state of New York. It is located southeast of Peekskill in Westchester County. In 1950, a 73-foot-tall (22 m) steel fire lookout tower was built on the mountain. The tower ceased fire lookout operations at the end of the 1971 fire season, due to the increased use of aerial detection. The tower was later cut down or pulled over by unknown individuals, and the remains are still on the summit.

== History ==
In 1950, the Conservation Commission built a 73-foot-tall (22 m) Aermotor LS40 steel tower on the mountain. The tower was placed into service in 1951, reporting 22 fires and 70 visitors. Due to increased use of aerial detection which was better, the tower ceased fire lookout operations at the end of the 1971 fire season. At an unknown date after that, the tower was cut down or pulled over by unknown individuals. The twisted remains are still on the summit of Salt Hill.
