= Goldtown, West Virginia =

Unincorporated community in West Virginia, United States

- Unincorporated community
- Location within West Virginia Location within the United States
- Coordinates: 38°36′42″N 81°39′10″W
- Country: United States
- State: West Virginia
- County: Jackson
- Elevation: 663 ft (202 m)
- Time zone: UTC-5 (Eastern (EST))
  - Summer (DST): UTC-4 (EDT)
- Area codes: 304 & 681
- GNIS feature ID: 1539494

Goldtown is an unincorporated community in Jackson County, West Virginia, United States. Goldtown is 15 miles (24 km) south-southeast of Ripley.
