= Foster Chapel, West Virginia =

Unincorporated community in West Virginia, United States

- Unincorporated community
- Location within West Virginia Location within the United States
- Coordinates: 38°45′19″N 81°46′41″W
- Country: United States
- State: West Virginia
- County: Jackson
- Elevation: 1,102 ft (336 m)
- Time zone: UTC-5 (Eastern (EST))
  - Summer (DST): UTC-4 (EDT)
- Area codes: 304 & 681
- GNIS feature ID: 1539166

Foster Chapel is an unincorporated community in Jackson County, West Virginia, United States. Foster Chapel is located on County Route 32, 5.7 miles (9.2 km) southwest of Ripley. Foster Chapel once had a post office, which is now closed.
