= LeRoy, West Virginia =

- Unincorporated community
- Location within West Virginia Location within the United States
- Coordinates: 38°54′21″N 81°32′42″W
- Country: United States
- State: West Virginia
- County: Jackson
- Time zone: UTC-5 (Eastern (EST))
  - Summer (DST): UTC-4 (EDT)
- ZIP codes: 25252

LeRoy (also Leroy) is an unincorporated community in northeastern Jackson County, West Virginia, United States. It lies along Liverpool Road between Reedy and Sandyville, northeast of the city of Ripley, the county seat of Jackson County. Its elevation is 646 feet (197 m). Although LeRoy is unincorporated, it has a post office (under the name of Le Roy), with the ZIP code of 25252.
