= Pleasant Hill, Jackson County, West Virginia =

- Unincorporated community
- Location within West Virginia Location within the United States
- Coordinates: 38°52′39″N 81°44′13″W
- Country: United States
- State: West Virginia
- County: Jackson
- Elevation: 919 ft (280 m)
- Time zone: UTC-5 (Eastern (EST))
  - Summer (DST): UTC-4 (EDT)
- Area codes: 304 & 681
- GNIS feature ID: 1555367

Pleasant Hill is an unincorporated community in Jackson County, West Virginia, United States. Pleasant Hill is located on County Route 11, 4 miles (6 km) north-northwest of Ripley.
