= Pleasant Hill, Wood County, West Virginia =

Pleasant Hill, West Virginia
- Unincorporated community
- Location within West Virginia Location within the United States
- Coordinates: 39°11′13″N 81°35′29″W
- Country: United States
- State: West Virginia
- County: Wood
- Elevation: 951 ft (290 m)
- Time zone: UTC-5 (Eastern (EST))
  - Summer (DST): UTC-4 (EDT)
- Area codes: 304 & 681
- GNIS feature ID: 1544990

Pleasant Hill is an unincorporated community located on County Route 38, 5.7 miles (9.2 km) south of Parkersburg in Wood County, West Virginia, United States.
