= Frozencamp, West Virginia =

Unincorporated community in West Virginia, United States

- Unincorporated community
- Location within West Virginia Location within the United States
- Coordinates: 38°49′30″N 81°34′42″W
- Country: United States
- State: West Virginia
- County: Jackson
- Elevation: 643 ft (196 m)
- Time zone: UTC-5 (Eastern (EST))
  - Summer (DST): UTC-4 (EDT)
- Area codes: 304 & 681
- GNIS feature ID: 1539286

Frozencamp is an unincorporated community in Jackson County, West Virginia, United States. Frozencamp is located on Little Mill Creek at the junction of U.S. Route 33 and County Route 16, 7.2 miles (11.6 km) east of Ripley.
