= Mount Moriah, West Virginia =

- Unincorporated community
- Location within West Virginia Location within the United States
- Coordinates: 38°47′11″N 81°45′56″W
- Country: United States
- State: West Virginia
- County: Jackson
- Elevation: 656 ft (200 m)
- Time zone: UTC-5 (Eastern (EST))
  - Summer (DST): UTC-4 (EDT)
- Area codes: 304 & 681
- GNIS feature ID: 1549837

Mount Moriah is an unincorporated community in Jackson County, West Virginia, United States. Mount Moriah is located on County Route 30, 3.7 miles (6.0 km), southwest of Ripley.
