= Given, West Virginia =

Unincorporated community in West Virginia, United States

- Unincorporated community
- Location within West Virginia Location within the United States
- Coordinates: 38°44′3″N 81°44′0″W
- Country: United States
- State: West Virginia
- County: Jackson
- Time zone: UTC-5 (Eastern (EST))
  - Summer (DST): UTC-4 (EDT)
- ZIP codes: 25245

Given is an unincorporated community in southwestern Jackson County, West Virginia, United States. It lies at the intersection of Rock Castle, Shamblin Run, and Wolfe Creek Roads, south of the city of Ripley, the county seat of Jackson County. Its elevation is 689 feet (210 m). Although Given is unincorporated, it has a post office, with the ZIP code of 25245.

The community most likely was named after the local Given family.
