= Cedar Lakes Conference Center =

Conference center in Ripley, WV

The Cedar Lakes Conference Center in Ripley, West Virginia, serves as a facility for leadership training for students. Multiple locations were proposed for this facility, but on March 15, 1950, the previous Easter Farm was chosen. It was officially opened on January 7, 1955, and then officially named in 1957.

The name "Cedar Lakes" was chosen because of its two lakes and many cedar trees. It is now 450 acres of 30 individual buildings. Now about 500,000 people visit annually. The West Virginia Department of Agriculture took control of the conference center on July 1, 2016.

== Events ==
- Mountain State Art and Craft Fair
- Future Farmers of America
- Technology Student Association
- 4-H
- Family, Career and Community Leaders of America
