= Statts Mills, West Virginia =

- Unincorporated community
- Location within West Virginia Location within the United States
- Coordinates: 38°44′15″N 81°37′20″W
- Country: United States
- State: West Virginia
- County: Jackson
- Elevation: 646 ft (197 m)
- Time zone: UTC-5 (Eastern (EST))
  - Summer (DST): UTC-4 (EDT)
- Area codes: 304 & 681
- GNIS feature ID: 1549939

Statts Mills is an unincorporated community in Jackson County, West Virginia, United States. Statts Mills is located on the Tug Fork and County Route 36, 7.5 miles (12.1 km) southeast of Ripley. Statts Mills had a post office, which closed on July 30, 2005.

The community was named for the local Staats family.
