= Romance, West Virginia =

- Unincorporated community
- Location within West Virginia Location within the United States
- Coordinates: 38°35′50″N 81°35′55″W
- Country: United States
- State: West Virginia
- County: Jackson
- Elevation: 669 ft (204 m)
- Time zone: UTC-5 (Eastern (EST))
  - Summer (DST): UTC-4 (EDT)
- ZIP codes: 25175 25248
- Area code: 304
- GNIS ID: 1549904

Romance is an unincorporated community in Jackson County, West Virginia, United States. It formerly had a post office with a zip code of 25175, but this closed on February 18, 1986. The area between Middle Fork and Advent is also considered Romance.

The community was named after Romance Parsons, an early settler.
