= Flatwoods, Jackson County, West Virginia =

Unincorporated community in West Virginia, United States

- Unincorporated community
- Location within West Virginia Location within the United States
- Coordinates: 38°52′47″N 81°46′46″W
- Country: United States
- State: West Virginia
- County: Jackson
- Time zone: UTC-5 (Eastern (EST))
  - Summer (DST): UTC-4 (EDT)

Flatwoods is an unincorporated community in northwestern Jackson County, West Virginia, United States. It lies at the intersection of Crooked Run and Harpold Roads, northwest of the city of Ripley, the county seat of Jackson County. Its elevation is 755 feet (230 m).
