= Gay, West Virginia =

Unincorporated community in West Virginia, United States

- Unincorporated community
- Location within West Virginia Location within the United States
- Coordinates: 38°46′14″N 81°33′11″W
- Country: United States
- State: West Virginia
- County: Jackson
- Time zone: UTC-5 (Eastern (EST))
  - Summer (DST): UTC-4 (EDT)
- ZIP codes: 25244
- Area code: 304
- GNIS ID: 1539361

Gay is an unincorporated community in Jackson County, West Virginia, United States. Gay has a post office with the ZIP Code of 25244.

One Mr. Gay, an early postmaster, gave the community his last name.
