= Rock Castle, West Virginia =

- Unincorporated community
- Location within West Virginia
- Coordinates: 38°42′45″N 81°47′12″W
- Country: United States
- State: West Virginia
- County: Jackson
- Time zone: UTC-5 (Eastern (EST))
  - Summer (DST): UTC-4 (EDT)
- ZIP codes: 25272

Rock Castle (also Rockcastle) is an unincorporated community in southwestern Jackson County, West Virginia, United States. It lies along Rock Castle Road, south of the city of Ripley, the county seat of Jackson County. Its elevation is 705 feet (215 m).

The community was named for a rock formation near the original town site.
