= Hereford, West Virginia =

- Unincorporated community
- Location within West Virginia Location within the United States
- Coordinates: 38°49′11″N 81°37′2″W
- Country: United States
- State: West Virginia
- County: Jackson
- Elevation: 633 ft (193 m)
- Time zone: UTC-5 (Eastern (EST))
  - Summer (DST): UTC-4 (EDT)
- GNIS ID: 1549735

Hereford is an unincorporated community in Jackson County, West Virginia, United States.
