= Advent, West Virginia =

Unincorporated community in West Virginia, United States

- Unincorporated community
- Location within West Virginia Location within the United States
- Coordinates: 38°36′37″N 81°33′31″W
- Country: United States
- State: West Virginia
- County: Jackson
- Time zone: UTC-5 (Eastern (EST))
  - Summer (DST): UTC-4 (EDT)
- ZIP codes: 25231

Advent is an unincorporated community in southeastern Jackson County, West Virginia, United States. It lies along Advent Road southeast of the city of Ripley, the county seat of Jackson County, and near Jackson County's borders with Kanawha and Roane counties. Its elevation is 791 feet (241 m). Advent had a post office, which closed on December 25, 2010.

The community took its name from the local Advent Christian Church.
