= Parchment Creek =

Stream in West Virginia, U.S.

Coordinates: 38°49′00″N 81°45′32″W

Parchment Creek is a stream in the U.S. state of West Virginia.

Parchment Creek was named after the local Parchment family of pioneer settlers.

== See also ==
- List of rivers of West Virginia
