= Kentuck, West Virginia =

- Unincorporated community
- Location within West Virginia Location within the United States
- Coordinates: 38°39′20″N 81°35′25″W
- Country: United States
- State: West Virginia
- County: Jackson
- Time zone: UTC-5 (Eastern (EST))
  - Summer (DST): UTC-4 (EDT)
- ZIP codes: 25249

Kentuck (also New Kentucky) is an unincorporated community in southeastern Jackson County, West Virginia, United States. It lies along Kentuck Road southeast of the city of Ripley, the county seat of Jackson County. Its elevation is 922 feet (281 m).

The community was named after the state of Kentucky.
