= Millwood, West Virginia =

- Unincorporated community
- Location within West Virginia Location within the United States
- Coordinates: 38°52′55″N 81°51′42″W
- Country: United States
- State: West Virginia
- County: Jackson
- Time zone: UTC-5 (Eastern (EST))
  - Summer (DST): UTC-4 (EDT)
- ZIP codes: 25262

Millwood is an unincorporated community in northwestern Jackson County, West Virginia, United States, along the Ohio River at the mouth of Mill Creek. It lies along West Virginia Routes 2 and 62 northwest of the city of Ripley, the county seat of Jackson County. Its elevation is 577 feet (176 m). Although Millwood is unincorporated, it has a post office, with the ZIP code of 25262.

== Climate ==
The climate in this area is characterized by relatively high temperatures and evenly distributed precipitation throughout the year. According to the Köppen Climate Classification system, Millwood has a Humid subtropical climate, abbreviated "Cfa" on climate maps.

== Notable person ==
- Warren Miller, U.S. Representative from West Virginia

== See also ==
- List of cities and towns along the Ohio River
