= Jackson County, West Virginia =

County in West Virginia, United States

- County
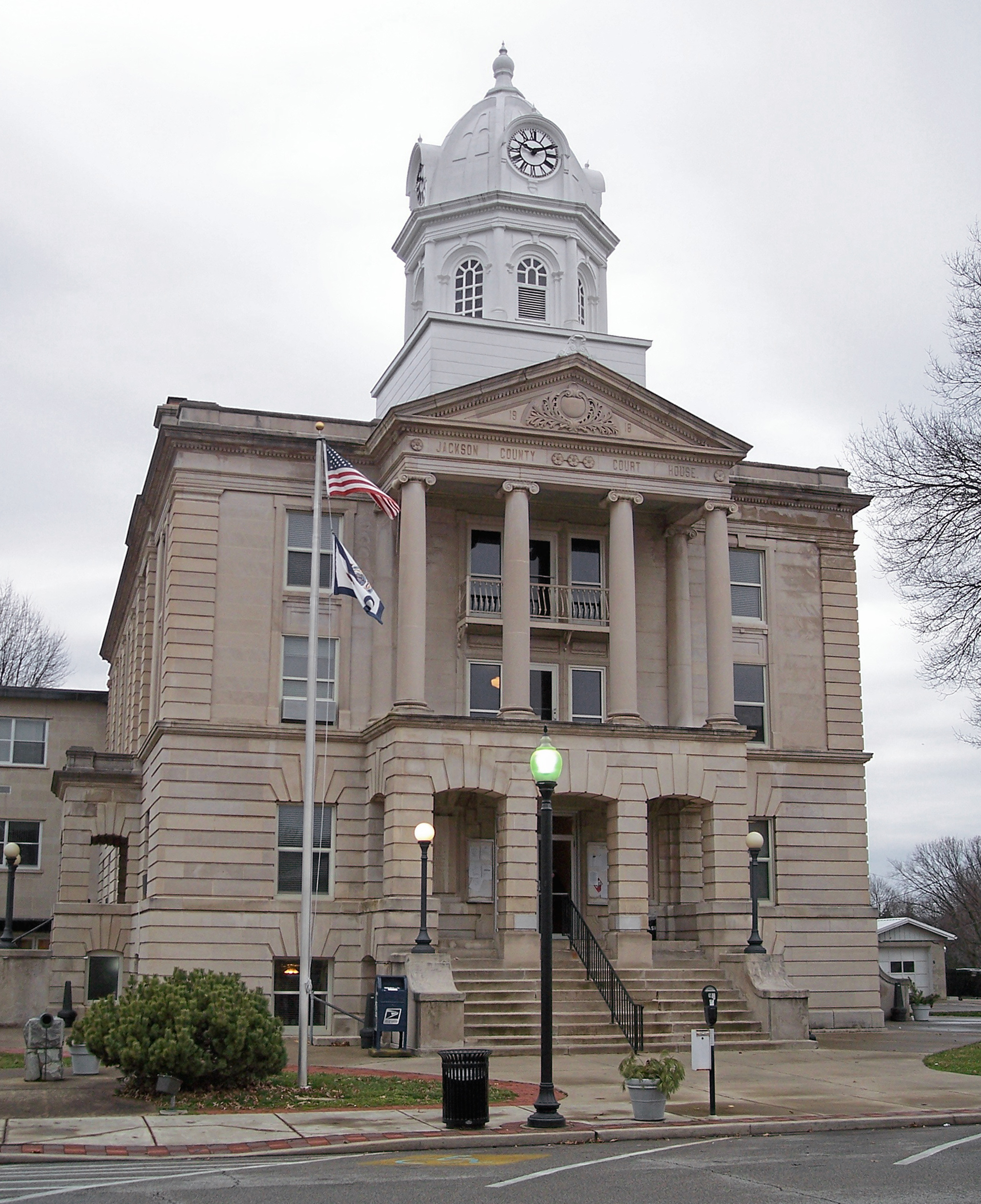
- The Jackson County Courthouse in Ripley in 2007

- Seal

- Location within the U.S. state of West Virginia
- Coordinates: 38°50′N 81°40′W
- Country: United States
- State: West Virginia
- Founded: March 1, 1831
- Named for: Andrew Jackson
- Seat: Ripley
- Largest city: Ravenswood

Area
  - Total: 472 sq mi (1,220 km^{2})
  - Land: 464 sq mi (1,200 km^{2})
  - Water: 7.3 sq mi (19 km^{2}) 1.5%

Population (2020)
  - Total: 27,791
  - Estimate (2025): 27,450 ▼
  - Density: 59.9/sq mi (23.1/km^{2})
- Time zone: UTC−5 (Eastern)
  - Summer (DST): UTC−4 (EDT)
- Congressional district: 1st
- Website: jacksoncounty.wv.gov/Pages/default.aspx

Jackson County is a county in the U.S. state of West Virginia. As of the 2020 census, the population was 27,791. Its county seat is Ripley, and its largest municipality is Ravenswood.

== History ==
In 1674, frontiersman Gabriel Arthur visited a large Native American village, probably the first white person to reach the area. French traders visited by 1696 and British traders by 1703. In 1749, Celeron De Blainville and his party traveling on the Ohio River left lead plates claiming the area for France. Baltimore-born explorer Christopher Gist visited the following year.

In 1770, when the area was still part of the Colony of Virginia, George Washington, his friend Dr. James Craik, and Col. William Crawford surveyed what eventually became Jackson County, staying on their return from Fort Pitt along Sand Creek at an Iroquois village led by Keoshuta and later at his hunting camp (which later became Ravenswood). Washington patented land claims in that area in 1793. and other land was deeded to Albert Gallatin. The future Ravenswood site was acquired by Sallie Ashton, wife of Alexandria, Virginia judge Nicholas Fitzhugh, and purchased from other heirs by Henry Fitzhugh, who moved to and developed the area, including building a saw and gristmill. The first (private) school in the county was opened in Cottageville in 1807, the second school at Murrayville in 1818, followed by a school at Ripley in 1829 and one at Ravenswood in 1839. Hunter and Indian fighter Jesse Hughes (1750-1829) settled in Jackson County, but he and his wife were evicted in their old age for failing to properly secure the title for the farm on which they had lived for decades.

=== Incorporation and splits ===
Two years later (in 1831) citizens petitioned for incorporating the county, which was formed from sections of Kanawha, Wood, and Mason Counties, and named for Andrew Jackson, seventh President of the United States.

Ripley, on Big Mill Creek about 12 miles from its confluence with the Ohio River and the location of a bridge on the West Columbia Pike as well as both a sawmill and a flour and grist mill (which also had a carding machine to make wool yarn), was laid out in 1832 and became the county seat; the courthouse was completed by October 1833, although it was not incorporated until 1852 (and re-incorporated in 1867). Ravenswood, about 12 miles further up Big Mill Creek, would be platted the next year by Henry Fitzhugh. Bartholomew Fleming began operating a ferry at Ravenswood in 1840, and a wagon road between Ravenswood and Spencer (which later became Roane County's seat) was completed in the early 1840s. However, the Baltimore and Ohio Railroad would not reach Ravenswood and Spencer (on the Wheeling to Huntington line) until 1886. Jackson County's population in 1840 was 4,890.

Increased settlement led to the formation of two additional counties from parts of what had been Jackson County. In 1848, the Virginia General Assembly authorized the creation of Wirt County from inland portions of Jackson and Wood Counties. In 1856, the Virginia General Assembly created Roane County from Jackson County.

=== American Civil War ===
During the American Civil War, the county was divided, but tilted toward the Union, and suffered from raids and bushwackers. At the Virginia Secession Convention of 1861, its joint delegate with upstream Roane County, lawyer Franklin P. Turner, twice voted for secession after rival meetings held by pro- and anti-secession forces in Jackson County on April 8, 1861. Jackson County sent several delegates to the Wheeling Convention, but Roane County sent none. Daniel E. Frost of Ravenswood, editor of the county's first newspaper and who had represented both counties in the Virginia House of Delegates, became the delegate for both counties. Fellow delegates also elected him the Speaker of the Restored Government's General Assembly held at Wheeling in 1861 and 1862 (which prepared for West Virginia statehood). Col. Frost would die fighting for the Union in 1863. Henrietta Fitzhugh Barre, the daughter of Henry Fitzhugh, sympathized with the Confederacy and kept a diary, first published in 1961. Another former delegate George B. Crow of Angerona (a silver boom town) would enlist as a Confederate and also reach the rank of colonel, but he survived the war. Confederate raiders attacked Ravenswood and Ripley in May and September 1862, and again in May 1863.

In July 1863, the Battle of Buffington Island near Ravenswood became the only naval action in West Virginia. The 9th West Virginia supported the tinclad and ironclad naval vessels, and they and Union forces across the Ohio River captured 1700 Confederates and set the stage for the capture of CSA Major General John Hunt Morgan and ended his raids.

When West Virginia became a state in 1863, its counties were divided into civil townships, with the intention of encouraging local government. This proved impractical in the heavily rural state, and in 1872 the townships were converted into magisterial districts. Jackson county was divided into five townships: Gilmore, Grant, Hushan's Mills, Mill Creek, and Washington. All white males who owned at least a house and 12 square feet of land were granted the right to vote. Hushan's Mills, including the area around Cottageville, was subsequently renamed "Union". In 1871, Gilmore Township was renamed "Ravenswood", and Mill Creek became "Ripley", after the county's two chief towns. All five townships became magisterial districts in 1872. They remained stable for over a hundred years, until in the 1990s they were consolidated into three new districts: Eastern, Northern, and Western.

=== Postwar development ===
Many former Virginians from the Clinch River Valley in southwest Virginia settled in the area by 1877, so the Bruen Lands Feud (also known as the Roane County Land Wars, which began with the death of a War of 1812 veteran circa 1845, leaving heirs in New York State, and was the subject of the 1864 U.S. Supreme Court decision in Harvey v. Tyler) reached Jackson county and led to several murders. The brother of a murdered U.S. Deputy Marshall published an account.

Timbering and oil and gas operations caused Jackson County's population to rise to 19,000 in 1900; it had the 6th largest area of cultivatable land of all West Virginia counties (divided mainly into small farms, hence by 1997 it also had the second largest number of farms in West Virginia). Kaiser Aluminum built a smelting and manufacturing complex beginning in 1954 that became a major employer in Jackson county. It changed hands several times after 1988 and experienced a major strike in the 1990s. The aluminum plant closed in 2015, although the rolling mill (under separate ownership since 2003 and which also changed ownership several times) still operates.

The Cedar Lakes Conference Center was also established circa 1954 and still operates (now through the U.S. Department of Agriculture), as does a Baptist conference center serving approximately 700 churches. The Jackson County Maritime and Industrial Complex encompasses 159 acres, including 25 acres devoted to barge loading and unloading.

== Geography ==
According to the United States Census Bureau, the county has an area of 472 square miles (1,220 km^{2}), of which 464 square miles (1,200 km^{2}) is land and 7.3 square miles (19 km^{2}) (1.5%) is water. The Ohio River forms part of Jackson County's western border. Sandy Creek and Mill Creek, tributaries of the Ohio, flow through the county's northern and central portions.

=== Major highways ===
- Interstate 77
- U.S. Highway 33
- West Virginia Route 2
- West Virginia Route 34
- West Virginia Route 62
- West Virginia Route 68
- West Virginia Route 87
- West Virginia Route 331

=== Adjacent counties ===
- Wood County (north)
- Wirt County (northeast)
- Roane County (east)
- Kanawha County (south)
- Putnam County (southwest)
- Mason County (west)
- Meigs County, Ohio (northwest)

=== National protected area ===
- Ohio River Islands National Wildlife Refuge (part)

== Demographics ==
Historical population
Census	Pop.	Note	%±
1840	4,890		—
1850	6,544		33.8%
1860	8,306		26.9%
1870	10,300		24.0%
1880	16,312		58.4%
1890	19,021		16.6%
1900	22,987		20.9%
1910	20,956		−8.8%
1920	18,658		−11.0%
1930	16,124		−13.6%
1940	16,598		2.9%
1950	15,299		−7.8%
1960	18,541		21.2%
1970	20,903		12.7%
1980	25,794		23.4%
1990	25,938		0.6%
2000	28,000		7.9%
2010	29,211		4.3%
2020	27,791		−4.9%
2025 (est.)	27,450	▼	−1.2%
U.S. Decennial Census; 1790–1960 1900–1990; 1990–2000 2010–2020

=== 2020 census ===
As of the 2020 census, the county had a population of 27,791. Of the residents, 21.4% were under the age of 18 and 21.1% were 65 years of age or older; the median age was 44.6 years. For every 100 females there were 97.2 males, and for every 100 females age 18 and over there were 94.8 males.

The racial makeup of the county was 95.4% White, 0.4% Black or African American, 0.2% American Indian and Alaska Native, 0.3% Asian, 0.5% from some other race, and 3.3% from two or more races. Hispanic or Latino residents of any race comprised 0.8% of the population.

There were 11,541 households in the county, of which 27.6% had children under the age of 18 living with them and 25.1% had a female householder with no spouse or partner present. About 27.8% of all households were made up of individuals and 13.5% had someone living alone who was 65 years of age or older.

There were 12,888 housing units, of which 10.5% were vacant. Among occupied housing units, 77.3% were owner-occupied and 22.7% were renter-occupied. The homeowner vacancy rate was 1.5% and the rental vacancy rate was 8.4%.

Jackson County, West Virginia – Racial and ethnic composition Note: the US Census treats Hispanic/Latino as an ethnic category. This table excludes Latinos from the racial categories and assigns them to a separate category. Hispanics/Latinos may be of any race.
Race / Ethnicity (NH = Non-Hispanic)	Pop 2000	Pop 2010	Pop 2020	% 2000	% 2010	% 2020
White alone (NH)	27,595	28,563	26,411	98.55%	97.78%	95.03%
Black or African American alone (NH)	23	78	100	0.08%	0.26%	0.35%
Native American or Alaska Native alone (NH)	57	41	43	0.20%	0.14%	0.15%
Asian alone (NH)	64	79	91	0.22%	0.27%	0.32%
Pacific Islander alone (NH)	4	9	2	0.01%	0.03%	0.00%
Other race alone (NH)	5	5	62	0.01%	0.01%	0.22%
Mixed race or Multiracial (NH)	171	251	852	0.61%	0.85%	3.06%
Hispanic or Latino (any race)	81	185	230	0.28%	0.63%	0.82%
Total	28,000	29,211	27,791	100.00%	100.00%	100.00%

=== 2010 census ===
As of the 2010 United States census, there were 29,211 people, 11,931 households, and 8,503 families living in the county. The population density was 62.9 inhabitants per square mile (24.3/km^{2}). There were 13,305 housing units at an average density of 28.7 units per square mile (11.1 units/km^{2}). The racial makeup of the county was 98.2% white, 0.3% black or African American, 0.3% Asian, 0.2% American Indian, 0.2% from other races, and 0.9% from two or more races. Those of Hispanic or Latino origin made up 0.6% of the population. In terms of ancestry, 22.4% were American, 18.4% were German, 15.7% were Irish, and 13.7% were English.

Of the 11,931 households, 30.8% had children under the age of 18 living with them, 56.5% were married couples living together, 10.3% had a female householder with no husband present, 28.7% were non-families, and 25.0% of all households were made up of individuals. The average household size was 2.43 and the average family size was 2.88. The median age was 42.2 years.

The median income for a household in the county was $41,406 and the median income for a family was $49,395. Males had a median income of $42,862 versus $32,376 for females. The per capita income for the county was $20,633. About 14.6% of families and 18.1% of the population were below the poverty line, including 28.0% of those under age 18 and 10.5% of those age 65 or over.

=== 2000 census ===
As of the census of 2000, there were 28,000 people, 11,061 households, and 8,207 families living in the county. The population density was 60 people per square mile (23 people/km^{2}). There were 12,245 housing units at an average density of 26 units per square mile (10 units/km^{2}). The racial makeup of the county was 98.75% White, 0.08% Black or African American, 0.21% Native American, 0.23% Asian, 0.01% Pacific Islander, 0.10% from other races, and 0.62% from two or more races. 0.29% of the population were Hispanic or Latino of any race.

There were 11,061 households, out of which 31.90% had children under the age of 18 living with them, 61.60% were married couples living together, 9.40% had a female householder with no husband present, and 25.80% were non-families. 22.70% of all households were made up of individuals, and 10.30% had someone living alone who was 65 years of age or older. The average household size was 2.50 and the average family size was 2.92.

In the county, the population was spread out, with 24.10% under the age of 18, 7.90% from 18 to 24, 27.70% from 25 to 44, 24.90% from 45 to 64, and 15.30% who were 65 years of age or older. The median age was 39 years. For every 100 females there were 94.80 males. For every 100 females age 18 and over, there were 91.40 males.

The median income for a household in the county was $32,434, and the median income for a family was $38,021. Males had a median income of $32,991 versus $20,253 for females. The per capita income for the county was $16,205. About 12.20% of families and 15.20% of the population were below the poverty line, including 21.60% of those under age 18 and 9.00% of those age 65 or over.

== Politics ==
Although its neighbour Roane County voted for secession on its behalf during the Virginia Secession Convention, Jackson County is believed to have had a Unionist majority when the Civil War broke out. This contention is supported by it being a historically Republican-leaning county, though much less so than the rock-ribbed Unionist trio of Ritchie, Doddridge and Tyler Counties to its northeast. The only Democrats to win the county since the Civil War have been Samuel J. Tilden in 1876, Woodrow Wilson in 1912, Franklin Delano Roosevelt in 1932, Lyndon Johnson in 1964, and Bill Clinton in 1992 and 1996.

United States presidential election results for Jackson County, West Virginia
Year	Republican		Democratic		Third party(ies)	
Year	No.	%	No.	%	No.	%
1912	1,199	26.43%	1,935	42.65%	1,403	30.92%
1916	2,474	54.55%	2,032	44.81%	29	0.64%
1920	4,330	60.30%	2,831	39.42%	20	0.28%
1924	3,739	55.52%	2,936	43.60%	59	0.88%
1928	4,150	62.86%	2,452	37.14%	0	0.00%
1932	4,084	49.71%	4,131	50.29%	0	0.00%
1936	4,711	57.65%	3,453	42.25%	8	0.10%
1940	5,104	60.74%	3,299	39.26%	0	0.00%
1944	4,486	65.14%	2,401	34.86%	0	0.00%
1948	4,277	61.78%	2,639	38.12%	7	0.10%
1952	4,845	65.10%	2,597	34.90%	0	0.00%
1956	4,984	65.75%	2,596	34.25%	0	0.00%
1960	5,535	60.49%	3,615	39.51%	0	0.00%
1964	4,359	46.47%	5,022	53.53%	0	0.00%
1968	5,173	53.99%	3,462	36.13%	947	9.88%
1972	7,226	70.61%	3,007	29.39%	0	0.00%
1976	5,360	50.12%	5,334	49.88%	0	0.00%
1980	6,041	57.09%	4,120	38.94%	420	3.97%
1984	7,117	62.93%	4,147	36.67%	46	0.41%
1988	5,696	55.35%	4,573	44.44%	22	0.21%
1992	4,192	37.33%	5,102	45.44%	1,935	17.23%
1996	4,235	40.54%	4,882	46.73%	1,330	12.73%
2000	6,341	55.05%	4,937	42.86%	240	2.08%
2004	7,686	58.41%	5,384	40.92%	88	0.67%
2008	7,148	58.42%	4,861	39.73%	227	1.86%
2012	7,408	63.90%	3,854	33.24%	332	2.86%
2016	9,020	73.31%	2,663	21.64%	621	5.05%
2020	10,093	74.71%	3,207	23.74%	209	1.55%
2024	9,907	77.27%	2,699	21.05%	216	1.68%

== Communities ==
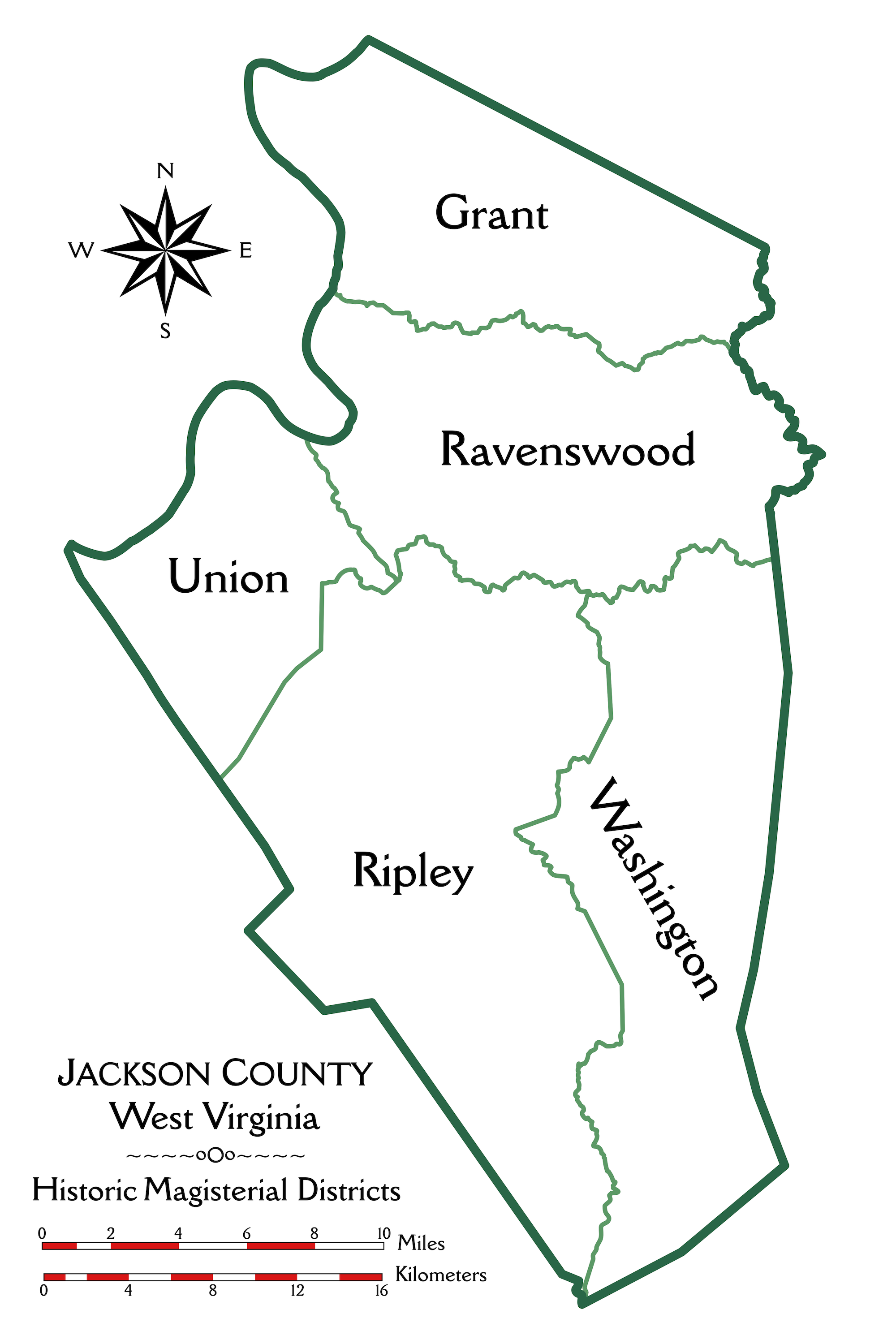
The five historic magisterial districts, now tax districts.

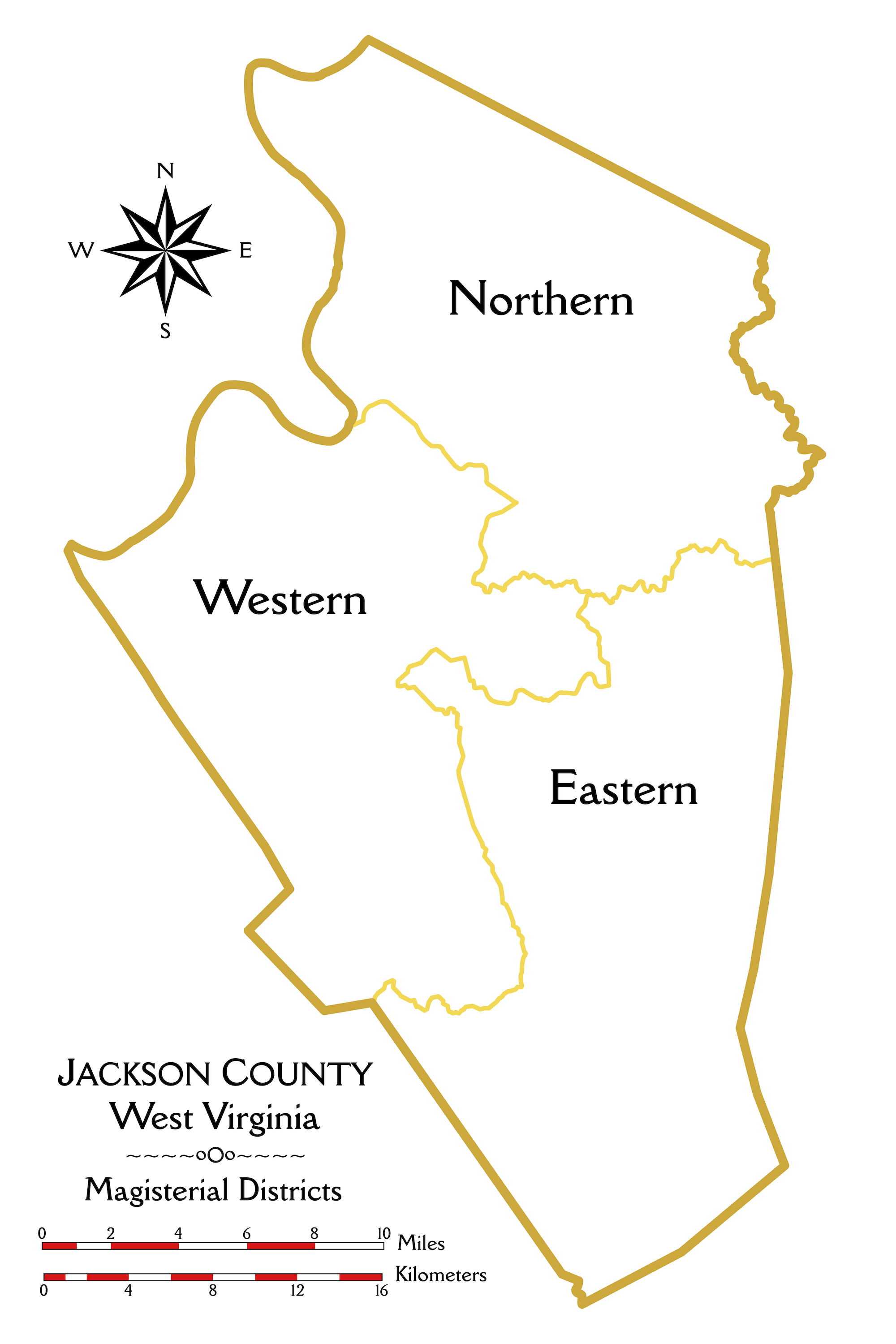
The three magisterial districts established in the 1990s.

=== Cities ===
- Ravenswood
- Ripley (county seat)

=== Magisterial districts ===
==== Current ====
- Eastern
- Northern
- Western

==== Historic ====
- Grant
- Ravenswood
- Ripley
- Union
- Washington

=== Former Town ===
- Huntsville

=== Census-designated place ===
- Cottageville

=== Unincorporated communities ===
- Advent
- Evans
- Flatwoods
- Fletcher
- Gay
- Given
- Independence
- Kenna
- Kentuck
- LeRoy
- Millwood
- Mount Alto
- Murraysville
- Rock Castle
- Romance
- Sandyville
- Sherman

== See also ==
- Jackson County Schools
- Frozen Camp Wildlife Management Area
- National Register of Historic Places listings in Jackson County, West Virginia
