= Willow (disambiguation) =

A willow is any of the several hundred species of deciduous trees and shrubs in the genus Salix.

Willow or willows may also refer to:

== Places ==
=== Australia ===
- Willows, Queensland
- Willows Sports Complex, Townsville

=== Canada ===
- Willows, Saskatchewan, an unincorporated community in the Rural Municipality of Lake of the Rivers No. 72
- The Willows, Saskatoon, a neighbourhood in Saskatoon, Saskatchewan
- Willow Bunch, Saskatchewan
- Willows Beach, Victoria, British Columbia

=== United Kingdom ===
- The Willows, Salford, home of Salford City Reds rugby league club
- Willow Tearooms, tearooms at 217 Sauchiehall Street, Glasgow, Scotland
- Willows and Wetlands Visitor Centre, Stoke St Gregory, Somerset
- Ferry Hinksey Road (AKA Willow Walk), a footpath in Oxford

=== United States ===
- Willow, Alaska
- Willow, former name of Willows, California
- Willow, Florida, an unincorporated area in Manatee County, Florida
- Willow, Illinois
- Willow, Kentucky:
  - Willow, Bracken County, Kentucky; see Kentucky Route 22
  - Willow, Lee County, Kentucky
- Willow, New York, a hamlet in Ulster County, New York
- Willow, Oklahoma
- Willow, Wisconsin, a town in Richland County, Wisconsin
- Willow Branch, Indiana
- Willow City, North Dakota
- Willow Glen, San Jose, California
- Willow Island, Nebraska
- Willow Street station, a station on the Blue line of the Los Angeles County Metropolitan Transportation Authority
- Willow Meadows, Houston, Texas
- Willow, Michigan, unincorporated community
- Willow Oak, Florida
- Willow Street, Pennsylvania
- Willows, California
- Willow, Wisconsin
- Willow Mountain, a summit in Texas
- Salem Willows, Salem, Massachusetts

== People ==
- Willow (given name), a female name
- Willow, a persona of professional wrestler Jeff Hardy (born 1977)
- Willow Nightingale, AEW wrestler

== Arts and media ==
=== Books ===
- Old Man Willow, an evil character in the J. R. R. Tolkien novel The Fellowship of the Ring
- Wicked Willow, three original novels based on the U.S. television series Buffy the Vampire Slayer
- Willow (Dreadstar), a fictional telepath created by Jim Starlin for the comic series Dreadstar
- Willow & Tara, an anthology in the Buffy the Vampire franchise
- "The Willow Song", sung by Desdemona in Shakespeare's play Othello
- "The Willows" (story), a short story by Algernon Blackwood
- Willows, Wisconsin, a fictional populated place in Barbie novels

=== Film and television ===
- Willow (1988 film), a fantasy film, directed by Ron Howard, with a story by George Lucas
- Willow (2019 film), a Macedonian film, directed by Milcho Manchevski
- Willow (TV channel), an American sports channel focused on cricket
- Willow (TV series), an American sequel TV series to the 1988 movie of the same name
- Willow, a cat on the BBC television show Blue Peter

=== Fictional characters ===
- Catherine Willows, in CSI: Crime Scene Investigation
- Grandmother Willow, in Disney's Pocahontas and Pocahontas II: Journey to a New World
- Lindsey Willows, a secondary character in CSI: Crime Scene Investigation
- Willow (comics), a mutant character created by Marvel Comics for their Marvel 2099 run X-Nation 2099
- Willow (Lesbian Space Princess), in the animated film Lesbian Space Princess (2025)
- Willow Park, in The Owl House
- Willow Rosenberg, in Buffy the Vampire Slayer
- Willow Stark, in Days of Our Lives
- Willow Ufgood, the title character from the 1988 film Willow
- A character from Tangled: The Series
- A character in the 1973 film The Wicker Man
- A character in the 2006 film The Wicker Man
- A bird in the video game Angry Birds Stella and The Angry Birds Movie
- A character in the Harry Potter-based fan fiction My Immortal

=== Video gaming ===
- Willow (arcade game), a 1989 Capcom platform game based on the 1988 film of the same name
- Willow (NES video game), 1989, based on the 1988 film
- A playable character in the indie survival game Don't Starve and its sequel Don't Starve Together
- Professor Willow, a major NPC in the AR mobile game Pokémon GO
- Willow, a Gill-man-like playable character in the mobile video game, Brawl Stars

=== Music ===
==== Albums ====
- Willow (Willow album), by Willow Smith, 2019
- Willow (Reflections album), 2020

==== Songs ====
- "Willow" (song), 2020, by Taylor Swift from the album Evermore
- "Willow" (Joan Armatrading song), 1977
- "Willow", a 2023 song by Kamelot from The Awakening
- "Willow", a 2023 song by Reneé Rapp from Snow Angel
- "Willow", a 2013 song by Said the Whale from Hawaiii
- "Willow", a 2013 song by Scale the Summit from The Migration
- "Willow", a song from the musical Venice which first opened in 2010
- "Willow song", Desdemona's song in operatic settings of Shakespeare's play Othello, first written down in 1583
- "Willow's Song", a 1973 song composed by American composer Paul Giovanni with lyrics by Robert Burns
- "Willows", a 2015 song by Vanessa Carlton from Liberman
- "Tit-willow", Koko's song in the 1885 Gilbert and Sullivan comic opera The Mikado, which first opened in 1885

==== Other uses in music ====
- Willow Smith, American singer and actress known mononymously as WILLOW
- The Willows (trio), Canadian musical group
- Willow flute, a Scandinavian folk flute

=== Other arts ===
- Willow pattern, also known as Blue Willow, a distinctive and elaborate pattern used on some pottery plates
- Willow Man, a large outdoor sculpture by Serena de la Hey

== Science and technology ==
=== Biology ===
- Pussy willow, a name for several species of willow, when bearing their furry catkins
- Seep willow, Baccharis salicifolia, a flowering shrub from the south-west US and northern Mexico
- Willo (Thescelosaurus), a dinosaur fossil thought to include a fossilized heart
- Willow-herb, any of the herbaceous plants in the genus Epilobium, many of which have willow-like leaves
- Willow oak (Quercus phellos), a species of oak with willow-like leaves

=== Technology ===
- Willey (textile machine), also willey, willow, twilley
- Willow processor, a quantum computer processor developed by Google
- Yokosuka K5Y, a Japanese World War II biplane trainer, (Allied reporting name Willow)
- Willows, an API for Unix systems to allow recompilation of Windows programs for Linux, featured by Caldera OpenLinux

== Other uses ==
- Willow (cat), owned by U.S. President Joe Biden
- Willow (typeface), designed by Tony Forster in 1990
- USCGC Willow, several U.S. Coast Guard cutters
- Willow project, an oil development project in Alaska
- Golden Willow (horse), the youngest horse to ever win the Badminton Horse Trials
- A cricket bat, made of willow tree wood

== See also ==
- The Willows (disambiguation)
- Willow Tree (disambiguation)
- Weeping Willow (disambiguation)
- Willow Creek (disambiguation)
- Willow Grove (disambiguation)
- Willow Hill (disambiguation)
- Willow Island (disambiguation)
- Willow Lake (disambiguation)
- Willow Park (disambiguation)
- Willow River (disambiguation)
- Willow Run (disambiguation)
- Willow School (disambiguation)
- Willow Springs (disambiguation)
- Willow Township (disambiguation)
- Willow Valley (disambiguation)
- The Wind in the Willows (disambiguation)
