= Central Arkansas =

- Metropolitan Statistical Area
- Little Rock–North Little Rock–Conway, AR; Metropolitan Statistical Area
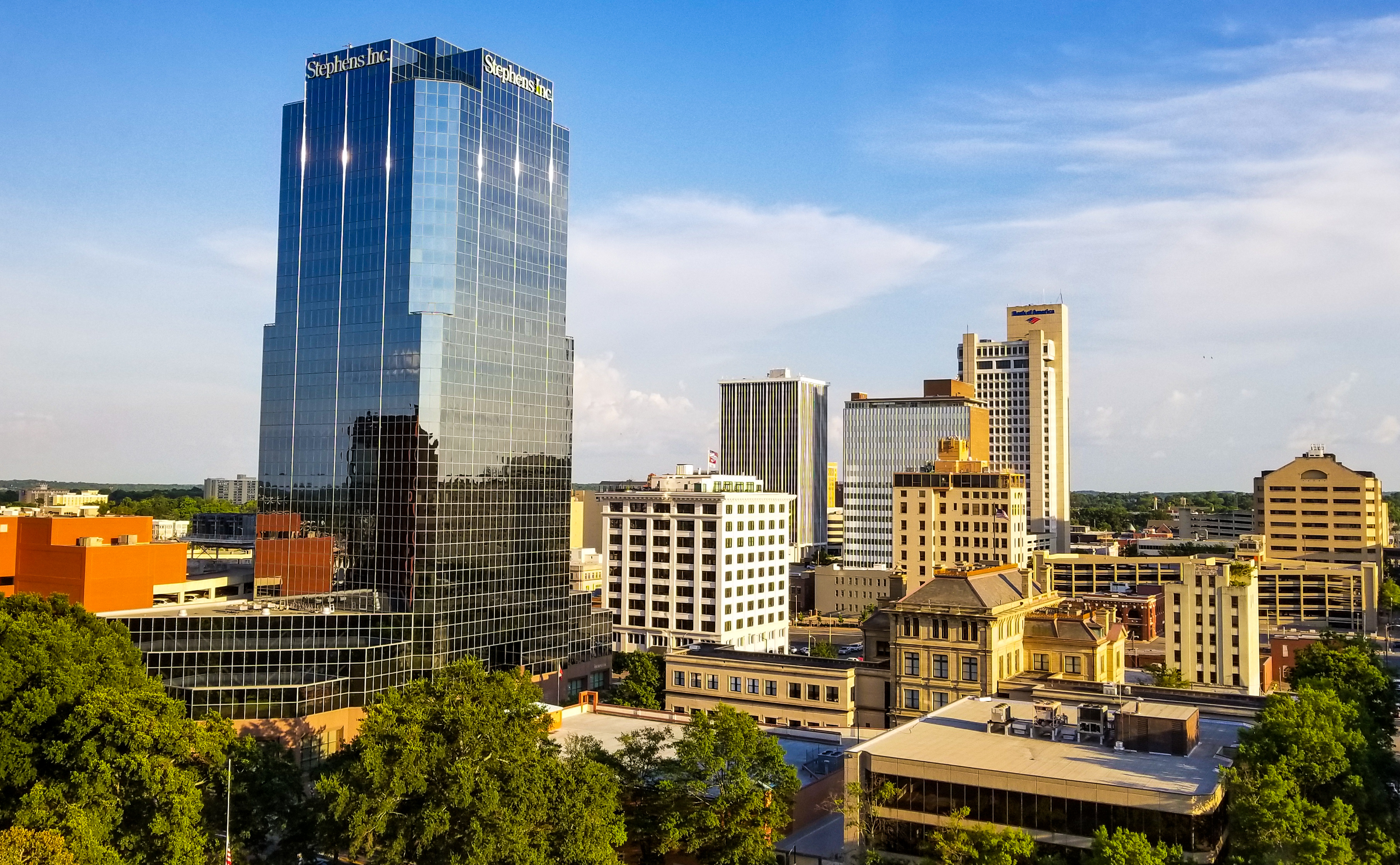
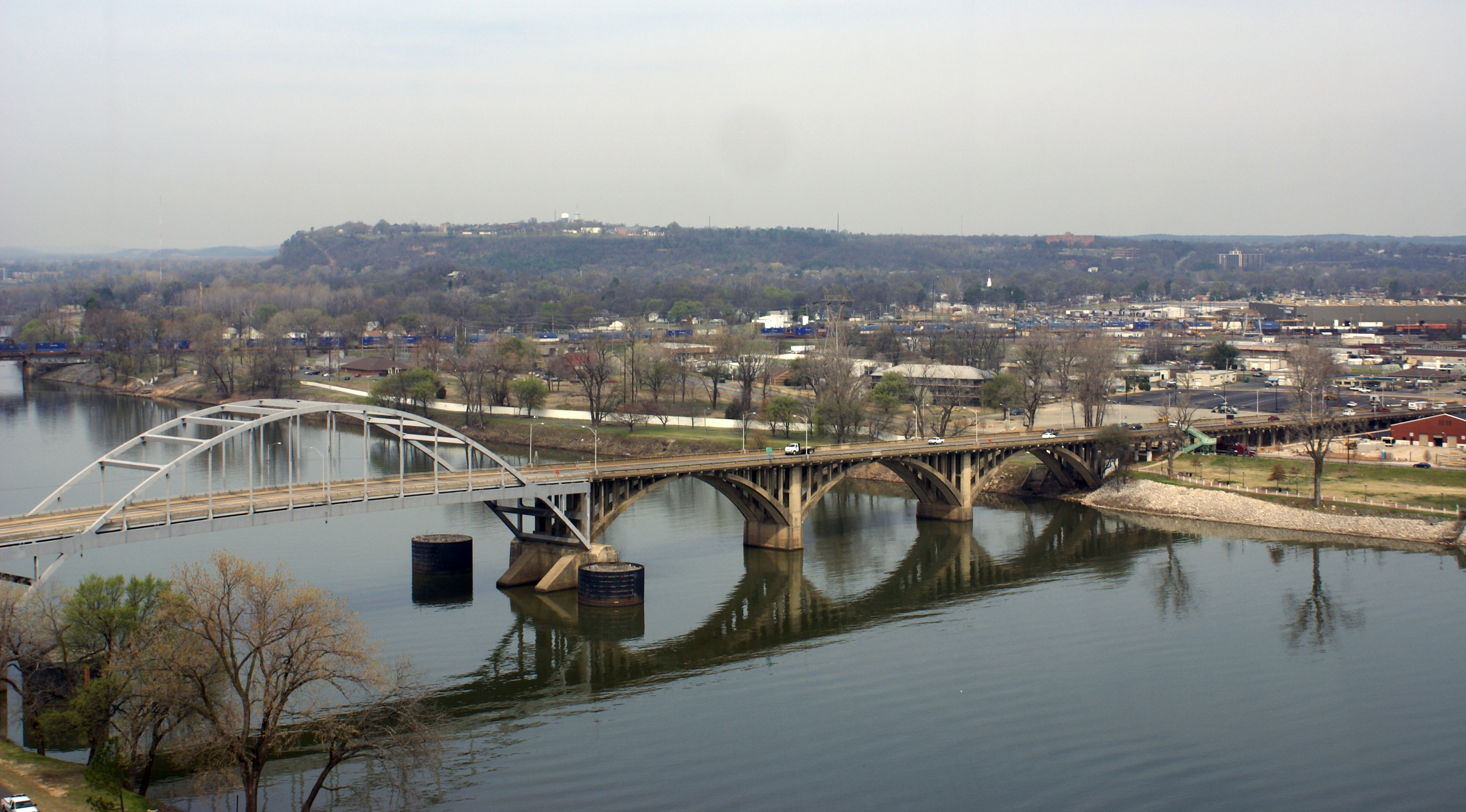
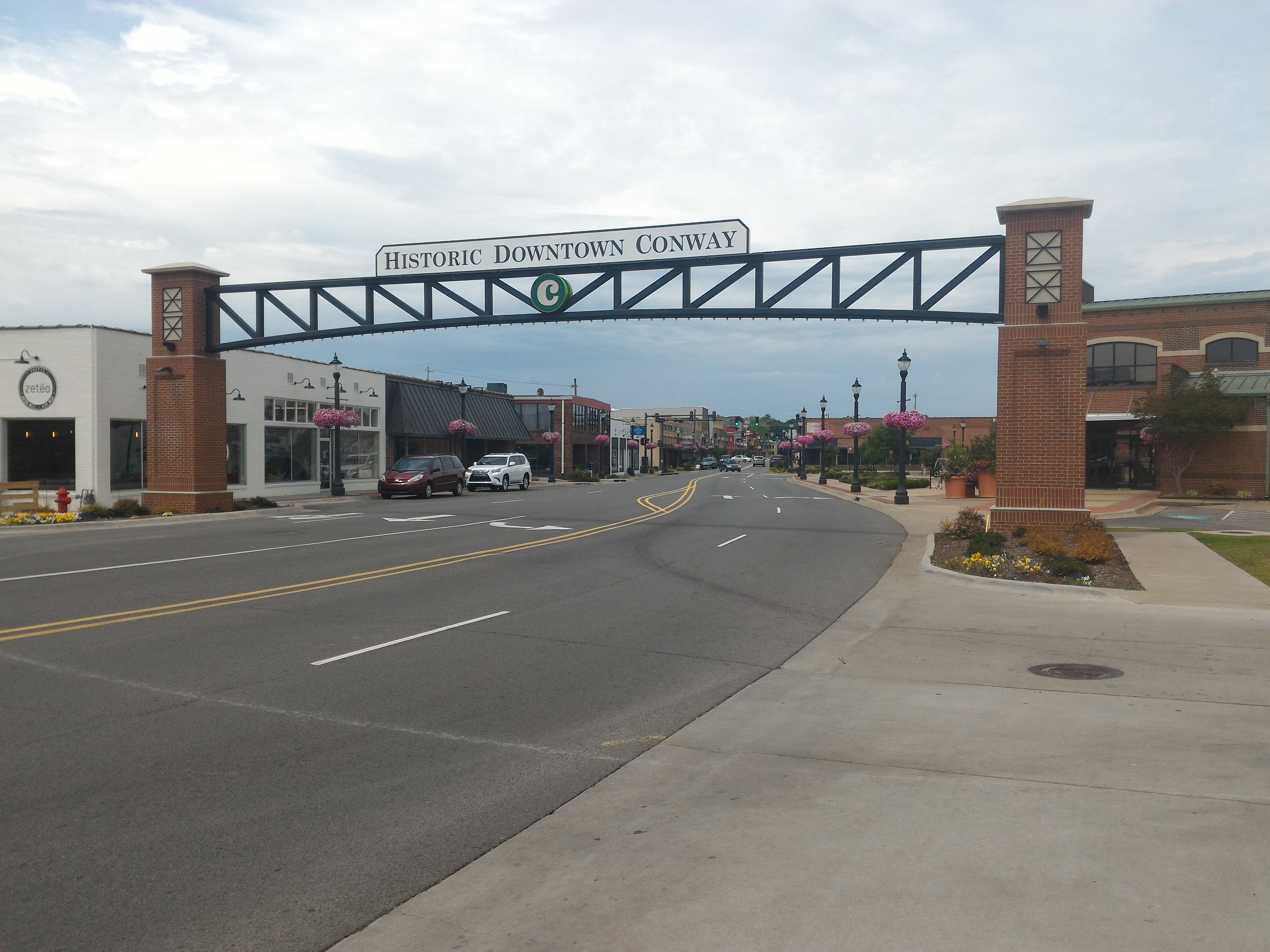
- From top to bottom: Little Rock, North Little Rock, Conway
Components of the Little Rock–
North Little Rock, AR CSA
City of Little Rock
City of North Little Rock
Little Rock–North Little Rock–Conway MSA
Pine Bluff μSA
Searcy μSA
- Coordinates: 34°44′10″N 92°19′52″W
- Country: United States
- State: Arkansas
- Principal cities: Little Rock; North Little Rock; Conway

Area
  - Urban: 258.3 sq mi (669 km^{2})
  - MSA: 4,085.18 sq mi (10,580.6 km^{2})
  - CSA: 7,150.31 sq mi (18,519.2 km^{2})

Population (2022)
  - Urban: 461,864 (US: 89th)
  - MSA: 748,031 (US: 81st)
  - CSA: 912,604 (US: 62nd)

GDP
  - MSA: $47.322 billion (2022)
- Time zone: UTC-6 (CST)
  - Summer (DST): UTC-5 (CDT)
- Area code(s): 501 & 870

Central Arkansas, also known as the Little Rock metro, designated by the U.S. Office of Management and Budget as the Little Rock–North Little Rock–Conway, AR Metropolitan Statistical Area, is a metropolitan area U.S. state of Arkansas. With a population of 748,031 at the 2020 census, it is the most populated metropolitan statistical area in Arkansas. Located at the convergence of Arkansas's other geographic regions, the region's central location makes Central Arkansas an important population, economic, education, and political center in Arkansas and the South. Little Rock is the state's capital and largest city, and the city is also home to two Fortune 500 companies, Arkansas Children's Hospital, and University of Arkansas for Medical Sciences (UAMS).

== History ==
The site known as "little rock" along the Arkansas River was found by explorer Bernard de la Harpe in 1722. The territorial capitol had been located at Arkansas Post in Southeast Arkansas since 1819, but the site had proven unsuitable as a settlement due to frequent flooding of the Arkansas River. Over the years, the "little rock" was known as a waypoint along the river, but remained unsettled. A land speculator from St. Louis, Missouri who had acquired many acres around the "little rock" began pressuring the Arkansas territorial legislature in February 1820 to move the capital to the site, but the representatives could not decide between Little Rock or Cadron (now Conway), which was the preferred site of Territorial Governor James Miller. The issue was tabled until October 1820, by which time most of the legislators and other influential men had purchased lots around Little Rock. The legislature moved the capital to Little Rock, where it has remained ever since.

== Geography ==
Central Arkansas is located in the Southern United States (commonly known as the South in the US), and within a subregion commonly known as the Deep South, although it is influenced by Upper South culture. The South is a distinct cultural region reliant upon a plantation economy in the 18th and 19th century, until the secession of the Confederate States of America and the Civil War.

The region is the point of convergence for five other Arkansas regions: the Ozarks to the north, the Arkansas River Valley & the Ouachita Mountains to the west, the Arkansas Delta to the east, and Piney Woods to the southwest.

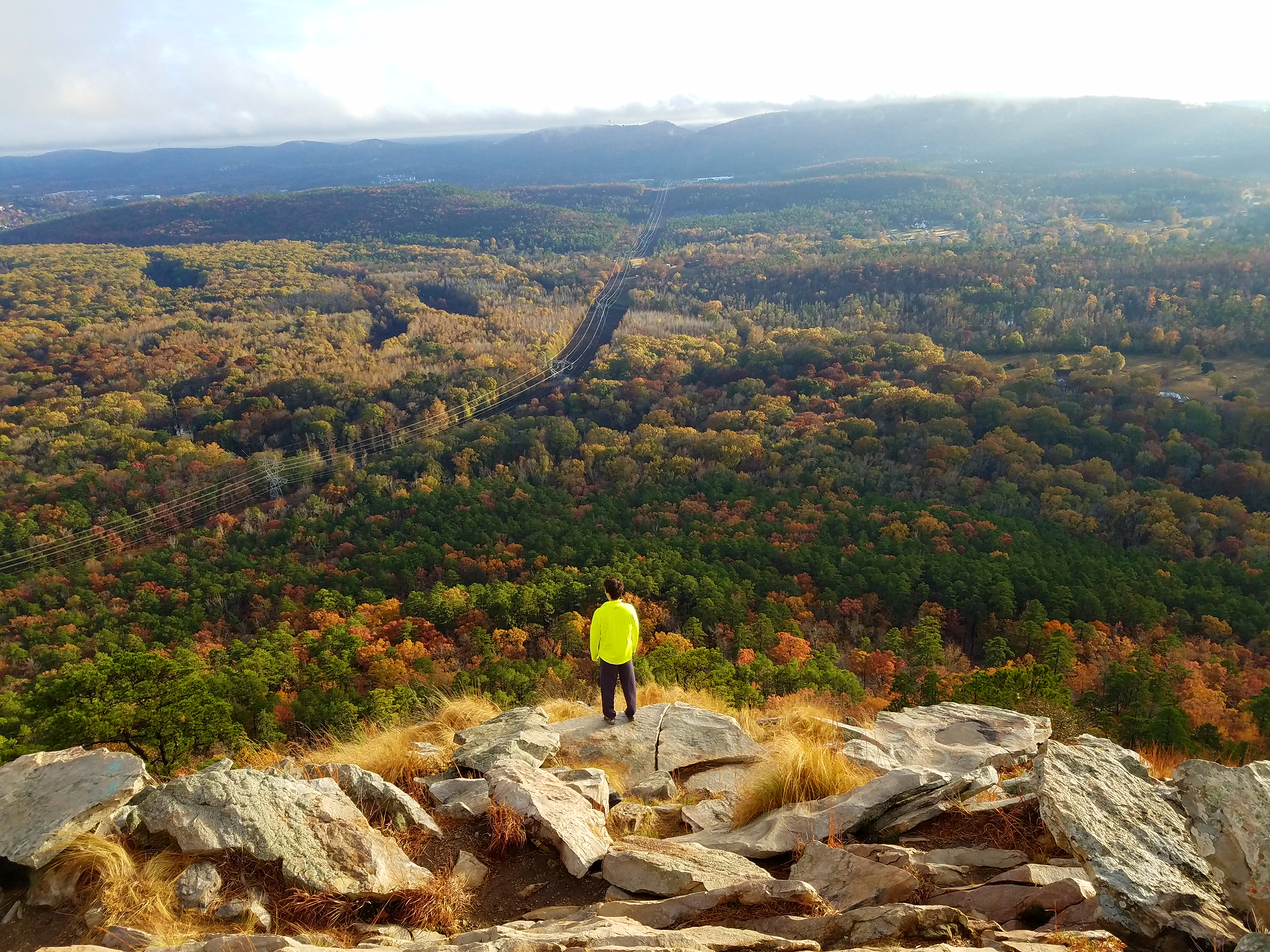
Pinnacle Mountain State Park 13 Miles NW of Little Rock, AR

The Arkansas River crosses the region, and serves as the dividing line between Little Rock and North Little Rock. The Arkansas is an important geographic feature in Central Arkansas, requiring long bridge spans but allowing barge traffic to the Port of Little Rock and points upriver.

== Demographics ==
Historical population
Census	Pop.	Note	%±
1840	7,411		—
1850	10,538		42.2%
1860	20,804		97.4%
1870	42,605		104.8%
1880	76,558		79.7%
1890	109,569		43.1%
1900	134,590		22.8%
1910	173,926		29.2%
1920	207,941		19.6%
1930	233,056		12.1%
1940	249,799		7.2%
1950	288,070		15.3%
1960	334,011		15.9%
1970	396,462		18.7%
1980	494,758		24.8%
1990	535,034		8.1%
2000	610,518		14.1%
2010	699,757		14.6%
2020	748,031		6.9%
U.S. Decennial Census; 1790–1960 1900–1990; 1990–2000

The Little Rock–North Little Rock–Conway, AR Metropolitan Statistical Area is defined by the Office of Management and Budget as consisting of Faulkner, Grant, Lonoke, Perry, Pulaski and Saline counties.

County	Seat	2025 Estimate	2020 Census	Change	Area	Density
Pulaski	Little Rock	404,611	399,125	+1.37%	808 sq mi (2,090 km^{2})	501/sq mi (193/km^{2})
Faulkner	Conway	133,979	123,498	+8.49%	664 sq mi (1,720 km^{2})	202/sq mi (78/km^{2})
Saline	Benton	133,288	123,416	+8.00%	730 sq mi (1,900 km^{2})	183/sq mi (70/km^{2})
Lonoke	Lonoke	76,664	74,015	+3.58%	803 sq mi (2,080 km^{2})	95/sq mi (37/km^{2})
Grant	Sheridan	18,756	17,958	+4.44%	633 sq mi (1,640 km^{2})	30/sq mi (11/km^{2})
Perry	Perryville	10,309	10,019	+2.89%	561 sq mi (1,450 km^{2})	18/sq mi (7/km^{2})
Total		777,607	748,031	+3.95%	4,199 sq mi (10,880 km^{2})	185/sq mi (72/km^{2})

The Little Rock MSA forms the core of the broader Little Rock–North Little Rock Combined Statistical Area (CSA). The CSA definition adds the Pine Bluff micropolitan area (Cleveland and Jefferson Counties) and the Searcy micropolitan area (White County). Its economic, cultural, and demographic center is Little Rock, Arkansas's capital and largest city. The Little Rock Combined Statistical area spans nine counties and had an estimated population of 927,903 in 2025.

Statistical Area	2025 estimate	2020 Census	Change	Area	Density
Little Rock–North Little Rock–Conway, AR Metropolitan Statistical Area	777,607	748,031	+3.95%	4,199 sq mi (10,880 km^{2})	185/sq mi (72/km^{2})
Searcy, AR Micropolitan Statistical Area	80,085	76,822	+4.25%	1,042 sq mi (2,700 km^{2})	77/sq mi (30/km^{2})
Pine Bluff, AR Micropolitan Statistical Area	70,211	74,810	−6.15%	1,513 sq mi (3,920 km^{2})	46/sq mi (18/km^{2})
Total	927,903	899,663	+3.14%	6,754 sq mi (17,490 km^{2})	137/sq mi (53/km^{2})

Prior to 2002, the area consisted of four core counties: Pulaski, Faulkner, Saline and Lonoke. The area was later expanded to include adjoining Perry County to the west, and Grant County to the south. The city of Conway was designated as a third principal city for the MSA by 2007.

=== 2000 Census ===
==== Metropolitan Statistical Area ====
As of the census of 2000, there were 610,518 people, 241,094 households, and 165,405 families residing within the MSA. The racial makeup of the MSA was 75.40% White, 21.02% African American, 0.44% Native American, 0.96% Asian, 0.04% Pacific Islander, 0.87% from other races, and 1.27% from two or more races. Hispanic or Latino of any race were 2.07% of the population.

The median income for a household in the MSA was $37,912, and the median income for a family was $44,572. Males had a median income of $31,670 versus $23,354 for females. The per capita income for the MSA was $18,305.

==== Combined Statistical Area ====
As of the census of 2000, there were 785,024 people, 304,335 households, and 210,966 families residing within the CSA. The racial makeup of the CSA was 73.97% White, 22.73% African American, 0.42% Native American, 0.85% Asian, 0.04% Pacific Islander, 0.80% from other races, and 1.20% from two or more races. Hispanic or Latino of any race were 1.93% of the population.

The median income for a household in the CSA was $35,301, and the median income for a family was $41,804. Males had a median income of $31,192 versus $22,347 for females. The per capita income for the CSA was $16,898.

== Communities ==
Communities are categorized based on their populations in the 2020 U.S. Census.

=== Places with more than 100,000 inhabitants ===
- Little Rock (principal city) (203,842)

=== Places with 50,000 to 100,000 inhabitants ===
- Conway (principal city) (69,580)
- North Little Rock (principal city) (64,531)

=== Places with 10,000 to 50,000 inhabitants ===
- Pine Bluff (39,123)
- Benton (37,558)
- Sherwood (33,118)
- Jacksonville (29,094)
- Cabot (27,190)
- Searcy (23,813)
- Maumelle (19,452)
- Bryant (21,877)
- Hot Springs Village (partial) (15,861)

=== Places with 1,000 to 10,000 inhabitants ===
- Beebe (9,400)
- East End (6,147)
- Ward (6,840)
- Greenbrier (6,170)
- Sheridan (5,202)
- Vilonia (4,568)
- Lonoke (4,277)
- Haskell (4,138)
- Landmark (3,620)
- Austin (4,027)
- Gibson (3,515)
- Gravel Ridge (3,232)
- Shannon Hills (3,143)
- England (2,825)
- Salem (2,544)
- Mayflower (2,234)
- Carlisle (2,214)
- McAlmont (1,873)
- Wrightsville (1,542
- Perryville (1,460)

=== Places with 500 to 1,000 inhabitants ===
- Alexander
- Leola
- Wooster
- Holland
- Sweet Home
- College Station
- Quitman (partial)
- Traskwood
- Cammack Village

=== Places with fewer than 500 inhabitants ===
- Adona
- Allport
- Bauxite
- Bigelow
- Casa
- Coy
- Perry
- Enola
- Fourche
- Guy
- Hensley
- Houston
- Humnoke
- Keo
- Mount Vernon
- Damascus(partial)
- Poyen
- Prattsville
- Scott
- Tull
- Twin Groves
- Woodson

== Population trends ==
Year	Metropolitan Statistical Area	Combined Statistical Area
2020 Census	748,031	912,604
2014 est.	729,135	902,443
2005 est.	645,706	820,846
2000 Census	610,518	785,024

== Economy ==
The Little Rock Regional Chamber of Commerce, the oldest association in Arkansas, has produced the following list of largest employers in Central Arkansas.

Employer	Number of employees
State of Arkansas	32,200
Local government	28,800
Federal government	9,200
University of Arkansas for Medical Sciences	8,500
Baptist Health	7,000
Little Rock Air Force Base	4,500
Acxiom	4,380
Little Rock School District	3,500
Central Arkansas Veterans Healthcare System	3,500
Entergy Arkansas	2,740
Pulaski County Special School District	2,700
AT&T	2,600
CHI St. Vincent Health System	2,600
Arkansas Children’s Hospital	2,470
Dillard's	2,400
Verizon Wireless	2,000
Union Pacific Railroad	2,000
Arkansas Blue Cross Blue Shield	1,800
Dassault Falcon Jet Corp.	2,000
CenterPoint Energy	1,800

Source: Little Rock Regional Chamber of Commerce

== Higher education ==
=== Notable colleges and universities ===
School	Enrollment	Location	Type	Nickname	Athletic Affiliation (Conference)
University of Arkansas at Little Rock	11,848	Little Rock	Public; State University	Trojans	NCAA Division I (OVC; UAC in July 2026); Non-Football
University of Central Arkansas	11,487	Conway	Public; State University	Bears and Sugar Bears	NCAA Division I FCS (ASUN; UAC in July 2026)
Hendrix College	1,348	Conway	Private liberal arts college	Warriors	NCAA Division III (SAA)

== Arts and culture ==
- Quapaw Quarter – start of the 20th century Little Rock consists of three National Register historic districts with at least a hundred buildings on the National Register of Historic Places.

=== Libraries ===
The Central Arkansas Library System, also known as CALS provides library services to residents. CALS also offers a non-resident option for those who live outside Pulaski or Perry County. For residents that do not pay taxes in this area, CALS offers a card at $72 per year, which can be paid monthly, quarterly, or yearly. CALS offers multiple different kinds of library cards, from individual to group and corporate cards. Spanning over 15 libraries, the Central Arkansas Library system offers a great deal of services. From regular book checkouts, CDs, DVDs and digital items, their borrowing materials are plentiful. They also offer a Library of Things, which includes fishing gear, tools, a seed library, toys, hotspots, telescopes, and birdwatching kits. All 15 library locations offer additional products for use inside of the library, like laptops, desktop computers, DVD players, Chromebooks, and more. In addition to the materials owned by the system and lent out, they also participate in an Interlibrary Loan program through the MOBIUS linking libraries system.

Patrons of the library can place these materials on hold for pickup at any of the CALS locations, and must pick items up within 7 days of the arrival. If the item is not picked up, there will be a $1 fee placed for each item not picked up on the library account. Additionally, fines may be added to patron accounts based on overdue or lost materials. Most items incur a 10 cent fine for each day they are overdue. If a library card account owes more than $100, their library privileges will be suspended until their record has been cleared.

Items may be returned to any CALS location, as a interlibrary system delivers materials to their home libraries. Many of the CALS locations have meeting rooms, some available for free with a library card and others require a small fee. Additionally, some libraries have notaries on staff, which are available to patrons for free. Some libraries offer book club kits, kits with 10 copies of one book and a discussion guide for book club members to utilize. For those with a temporary or permanent disability, CALS offers a Books-By-Mail service.

On top of the 15 library locations, CALS also owns and operates other buildings and events.

Rock It! Lab at 120 River Market Ave Little Rock, AR 72201 is a training building created for entrepreneurs to start their businesses. This lab was created in partnership with Advancing Black Entrepreneurship (ABE) and it provides varied services to the public, such as tech assistance, promotional training, business education, and mentorship.

Ron Robinson Theater at 100 River Market Ave, Little Rock, AR. 72201 is a 315-seat theater located nearby the Main Library in Downtown Little Rock. This theater houses all sorts of events, from speakers to movies to private reservations and more. Notable events include the Rock City Film Festival (formerly known as the Made in Arkansas Film Festival) which has been held at the Robinson Theater for 7 years. Similarly to other CALS meeting spaces, the Ron Robinson Theater can be reserved by patrons for a fee, based on availability due to the events the library maintains in the space.

=== Museums ===
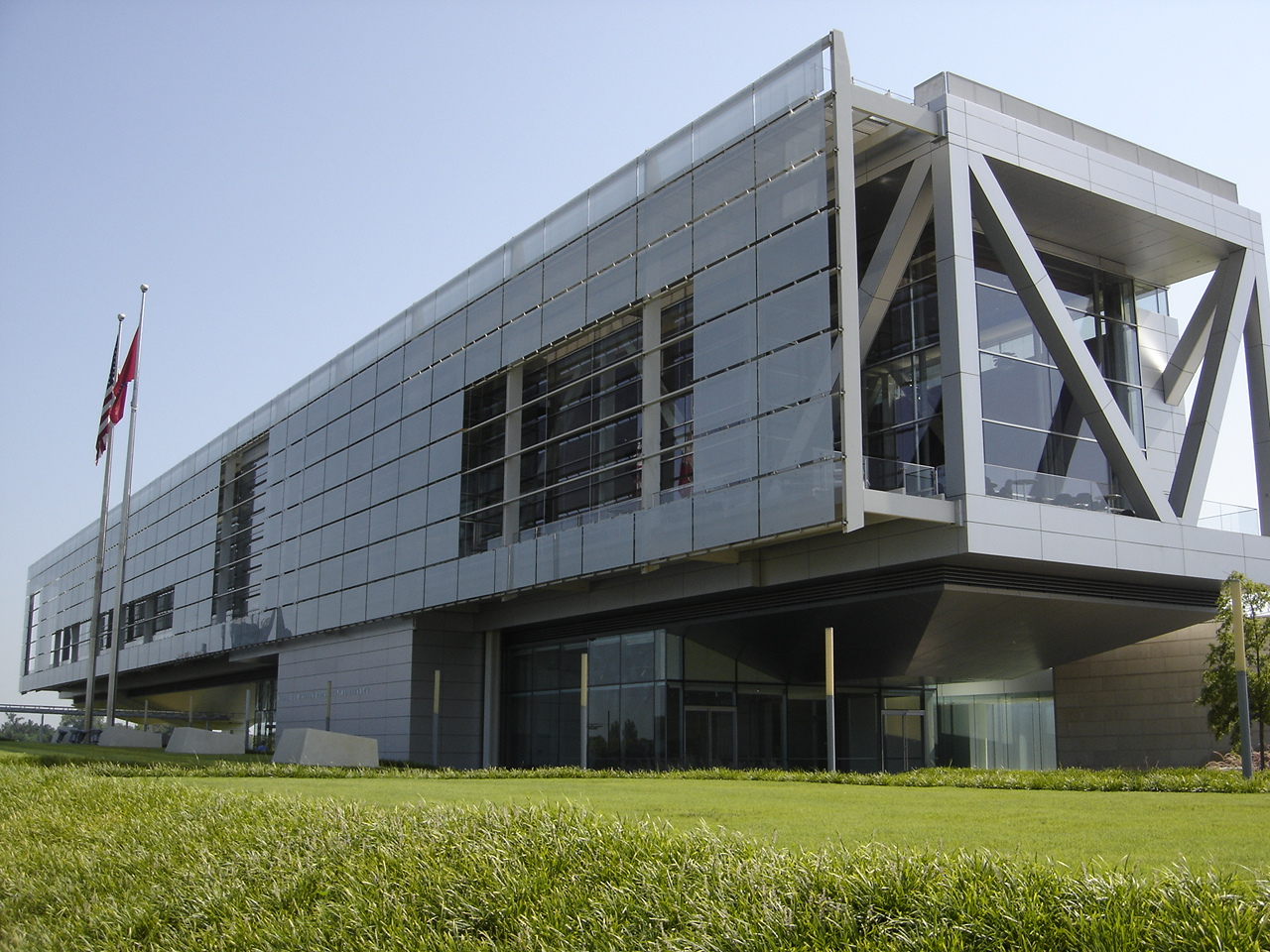
William J. Clinton Presidential Library, in downtown Little Rock

- The Arkansas Museum of Fine Arts, the state's largest cultural institution, is a museum of art and an active center for the visual and performing arts.
- The Museum of Discovery features hands-on exhibits in the fields of science, history and technology.
- The William J. Clinton Presidential Center and Heifer Village include the Clinton presidential library and the offices of the Clinton Foundation and the Clinton School of Public Service. The Library facility, designed by architect James Polshek, cantilevers over the Arkansas River, echoing Clinton's campaign promise of "building a bridge to the 21st century". The archives and library have 2 million photographs, 80 million pages of documents, 21 million e-mail messages, and nearly 80,000 artifacts from the Clinton presidency. The museum within the library showcases artifacts from Clinton's term and has a full-scale replica of the Clinton-era Oval Office. Opened on November 18, 2004, the Clinton Presidential Center cost $165 million to construct and covers 150,000 square feet (14,000 m^{2}) within a 28-acre (113,000 m^{2}) park.
- The Historic Arkansas Museum is a regional history museum focusing primarily on the frontier time period.
- The MacArthur Museum of Arkansas Military History and Macarthur Park opened in 2001, the last remaining structure of the original Little Rock Arsenal and one of the oldest buildings in central Arkansas, it was the birthplace of General Douglas MacArthur who went on to be the supreme commander of US forces in the South Pacific during World War II.
- The Old State House Museum is a former state capitol building now home to a history museum focusing on Arkansas's recent history.
- The Mosaic Templars Cultural Center is a nationally accredited, state-funded museum and cultural center focusing on African American history and culture in Arkansas.
- The ESSE Purse Museum illustrates the stories of American women's lives during the 1900s through their handbags and the day-to-day items carried in them.
- The Little Rock Central High School is still a functioning high school but contains a museum, visitors center, and park on the school grounds.
- The Arkansas National Guard Museum
- The Simmons Bank Arena with the Arkansas Sports Hall of Fame Museum.
- The Arkansas Inland Maritime Museum, and the Navy tug Hoga (YT-146), a survivor of the attack on Pearl Harbor, and the USS Razorback (SS-394), which was at the surrender in Tokyo Bay
- The Faulkner County Museum focuses on the prehistory, history, and culture of Faulkner County. Located inside the former Faulkner County Jail, it displays photos, artifacts, equipment, household items, clothing, and arts and crafts by local artists.
- Plantation Agriculture Museum, located in Scott displays artifacts from Arkansas's agricultural history in large farming operations, particularly cotton cultivation. The museum is housed in a circa-1912 general store building, and also features a restored 1912 cotton gin, Seed Warehouse #5, and chronicles the period from Arkansas's statehood to the end of World War II focusing on tenant farming and agricultural mechanization.
- Plum Bayou Mounds Archeological State Park, located in Scott, focuses on the site of a Native American civilization that lived just east of present-day Scott nearly 1,000 years ago. Mounds at the park comprise one of the most significant remnants of Native American life in the state, and are listed on the National Register of Historic Places. The Arkansas Archeological Survey, part of the University of Arkansas system, maintains its Plum Bayou Research Station and laboratory in the park's visitor center.
- The Scott Plantation Settlement, a grouping of relocated buildings including the wooden Cotton Belt Railroad Depot that served Scott, collected to represent the area's plantation-era heritage (much in the same fashion as Little Rock's Historic Arkansas Museum).
- Marlsgate Dortch Plantation, the area's best known example of a plantation family home, was constructed on the Lonoke County side by the Dortch family early in the 20th century and is a popular site for weddings and receptions today.
- Vogel Schwartz Sculpture Garden
- Witt Stephens Jr. Central Arkansas Nature Center
- The Galleries at Library Square
- Hearne Fine Art Gallery
- Arkansas School for the Deaf Historical Museum
- Baum Gallery
- Arkansas Game and Fish Foundation Sports Complex
- Jacksonville Guitar Center and Museum
- Jacksonville Museum of Military History
- Reed’s Bridge Battlefield Heritage Park

=== Music and theater ===
- The Arkansas Repertory Theatre is the state's largest nonprofit professional theatre company. A member of the League of Resident Theatres (LORT D), The Rep has produced more than 300 productions, including 40 world premieres, in its building in downtown Little Rock. Producing Artistic Director John Miller-Stephany leads a resident staff of designers, technicians and administrators in eight to ten productions for an annual audience in excess of 70,000 for MainStage productions, educational programming and touring. The Rep produces works from contemporary comedies and dramas to world premiers and the classics of dramatic literature.
- The Community Theatre of Little Rock, founded in 1956, is the area's oldest performance art company.
- The Arkansas Symphony Orchestra performs over 30 concerts a year and many events.
- The Robinson Center Music Hall is the main performance center of the Arkansas Symphony Orchestra.
- The Wildwood Park for the Arts is the largest park dedicated to the performing arts in the South; it features seasonal festivals and cultural events.
- The Argenta Historic District and Argenta Plaza

== Parks and Recreation ==
- The River Market Artspace and Park
- Burns Park
- T. R. Pugh Memorial Park, location of the Old Mill in the movie Gone With The Wind
- Arkansas Arboretum – at Pinnacle Mountain; it has a trail with flora and tree plantings.
- Arkansas River Trail
- Little Rock Zoo – consists of at least 725 animals and over 200 species
- Pinnacle Mountain State Park
- Willow Springs Water Park – one of the first water theme parks in the U.S., built in 1928.
- Bayou Meto Urban Canoe Trail

== Transportation ==
=== Major highways ===
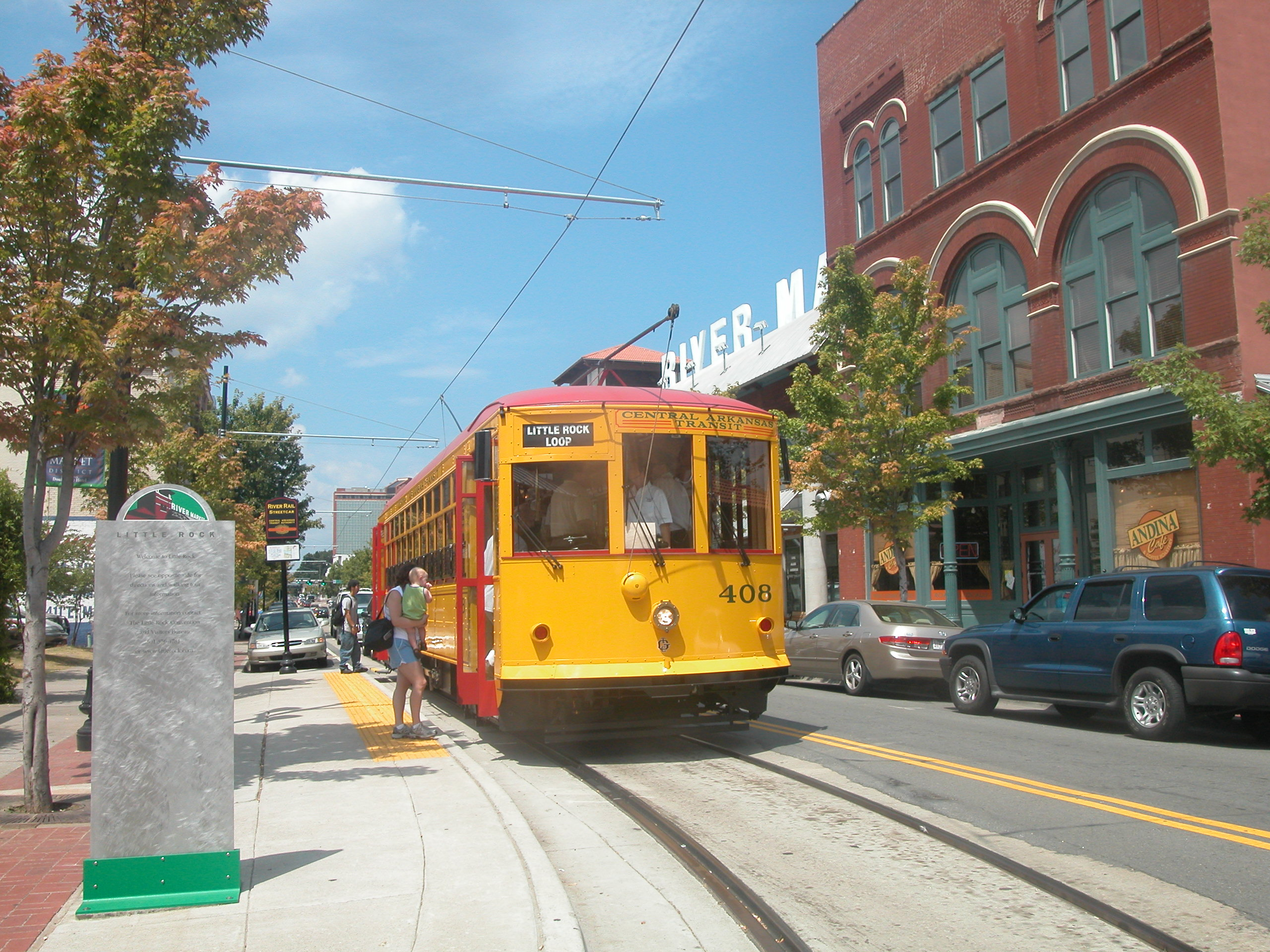
Rock Region Metro streetcar near the River Market District in Little Rock, AR

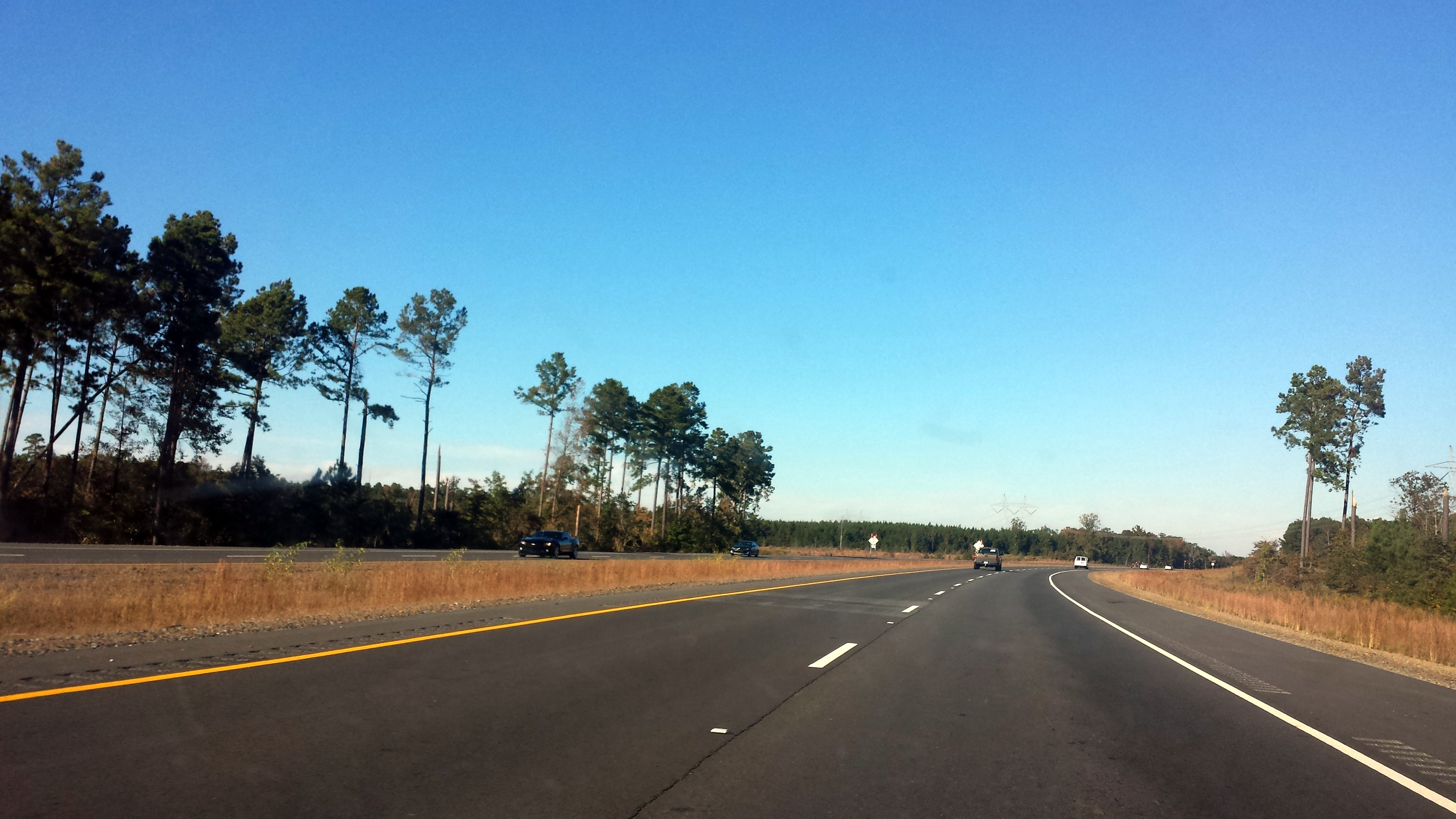
US 167 in Sheridan

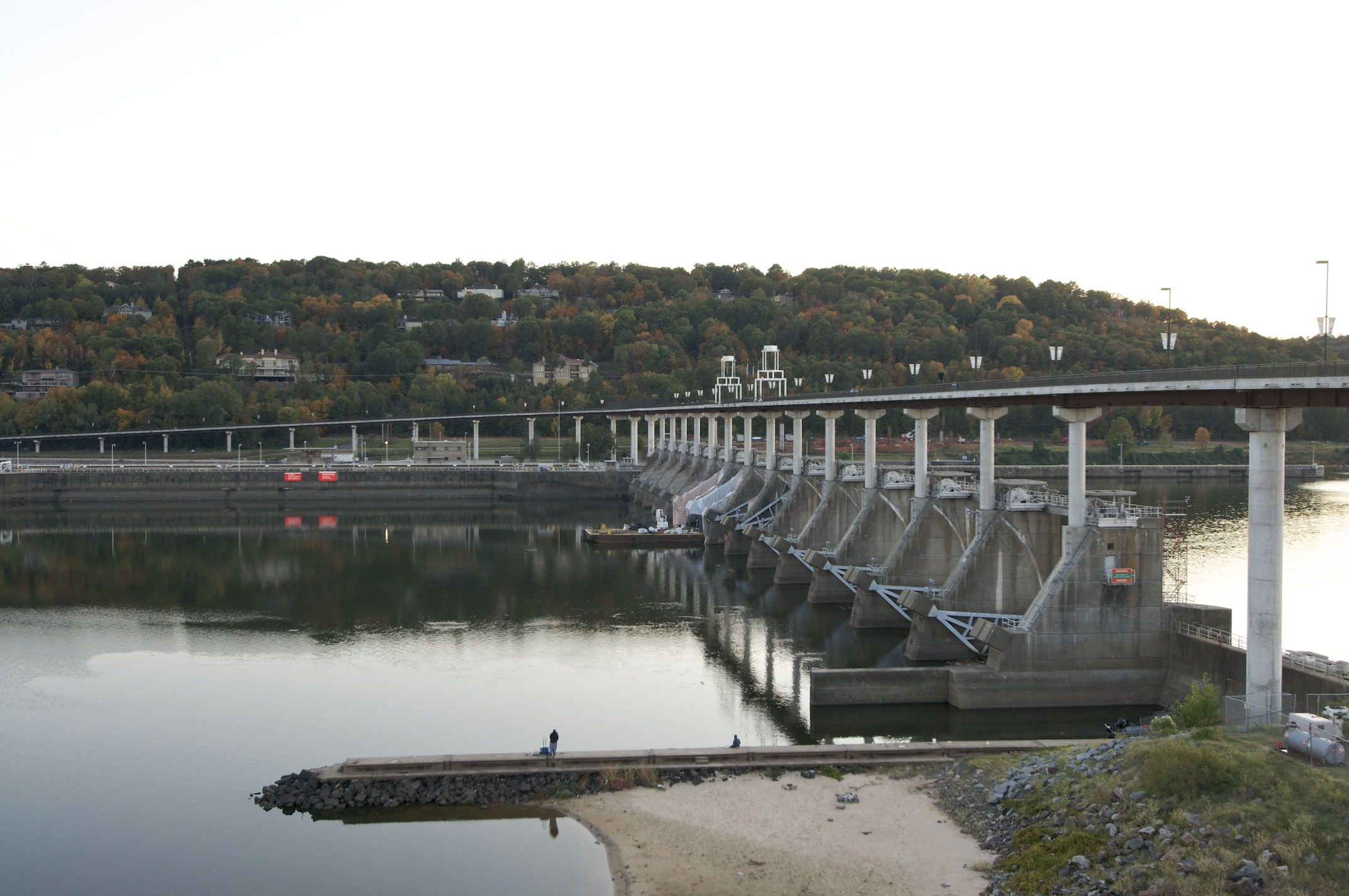
"Big Dam Bridge" as seen from North Little Rock, AR

- I-30
  - I-430
  - I-530
  - I-630
- I-40
  - I-440
- I-57
- US 64
- US 65
- US 67
- US 70
- US 165
- US 167
- US 270

=== Aviation ===
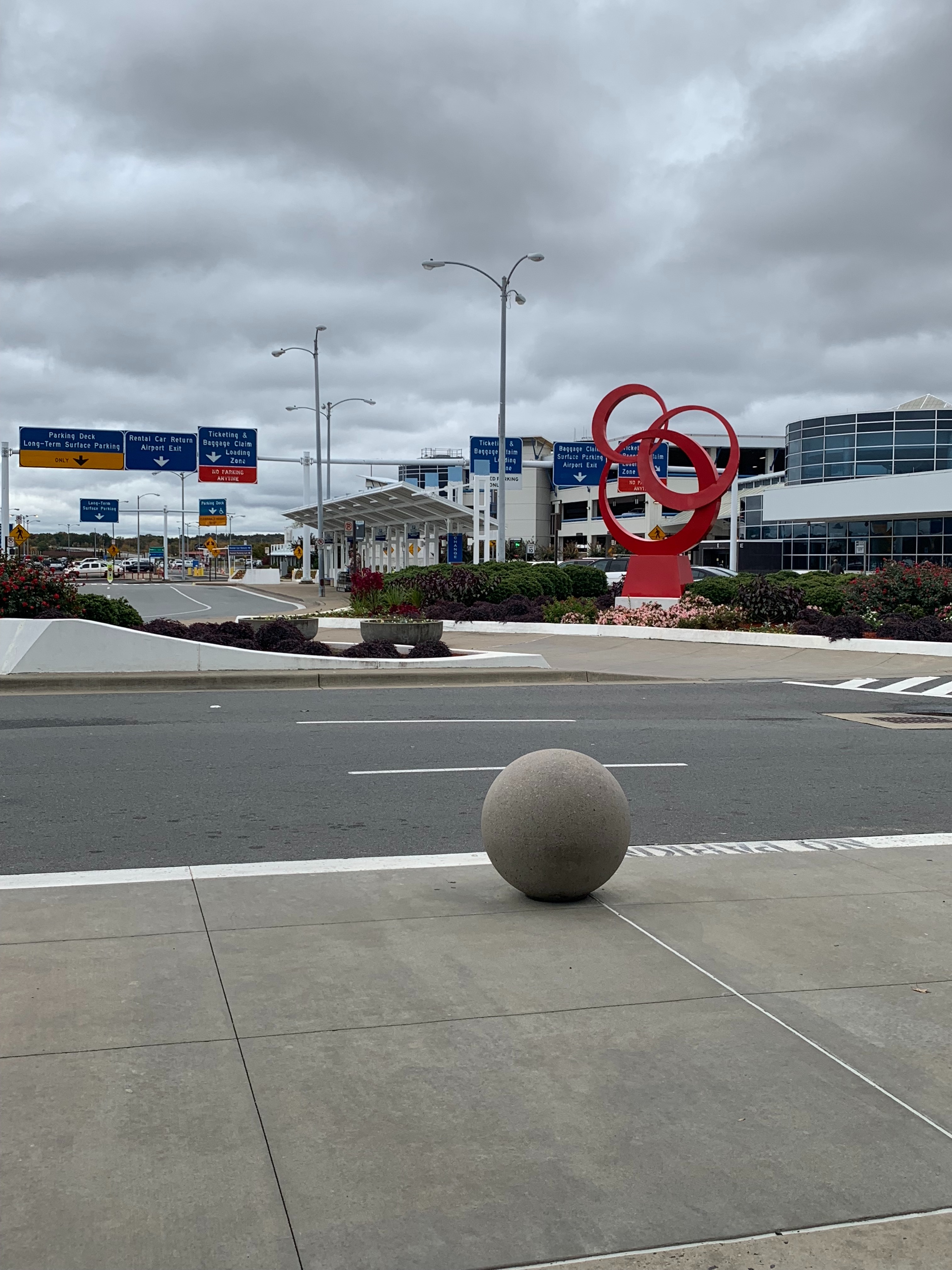
Clinton National Airport in Little Rock, AR

The Clinton National Airport in Little Rock is the largest commercial airport in the state, with more than 100 flights arriving or departing each day and nonstop jet service to eighteen cities. North Little Rock Municipal Airport, located across the Arkansas River, is designated as a general aviation reliever airport for Clinton National by the Federal Aviation Administration (FAA). Central Arkansas also has several smaller municipally owned general aviation airports: Conway Airport at Cantrell Field in Conway, Saline County Regional Airport in Benton, Grider Field in Pine Bluff.

== Professional sports ==
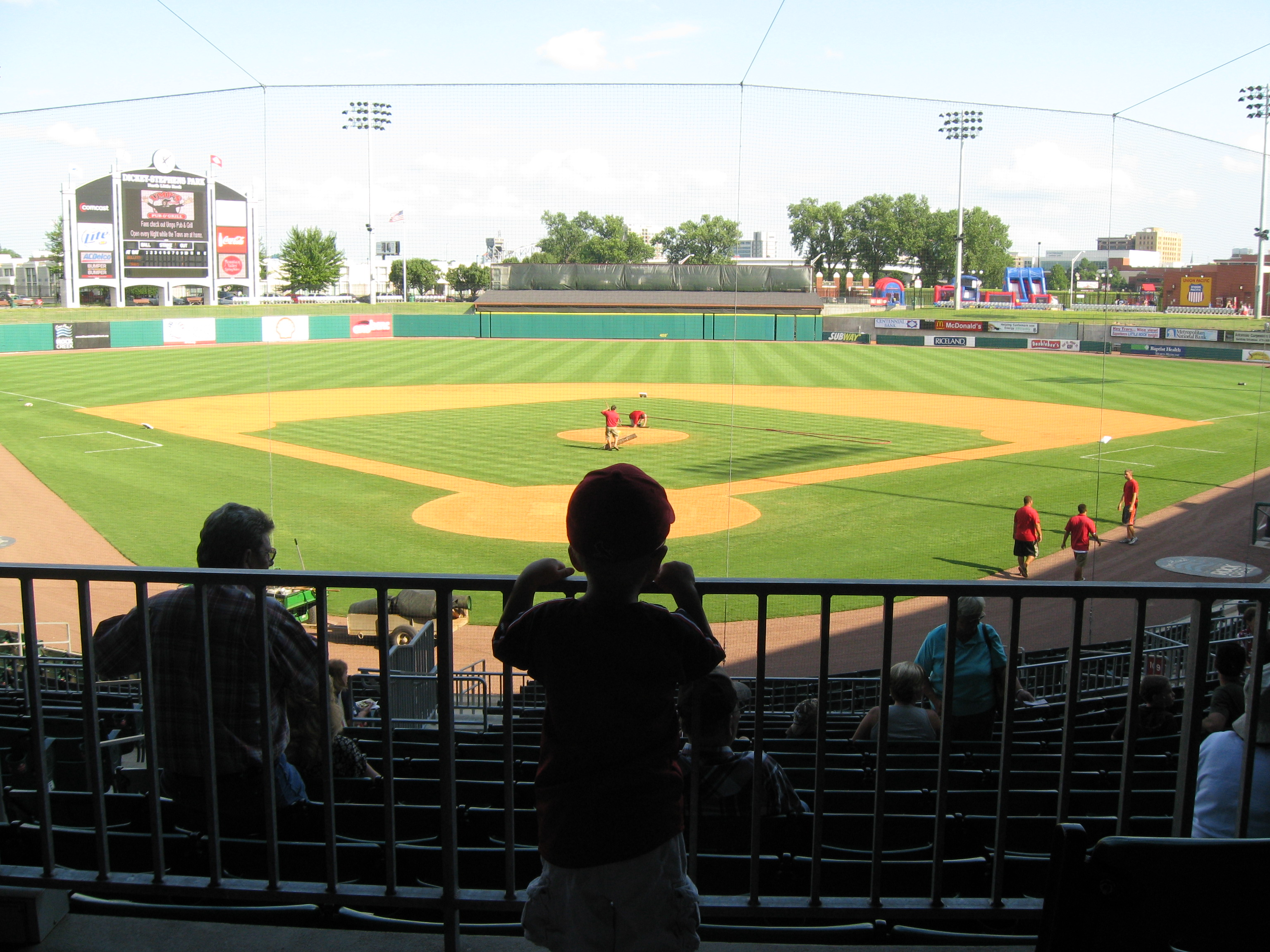
Dickey–Stephens Park

The city of Little Rock is home to the Arkansas Travelers. The Travelers are the AA Minor League Baseball affiliate of the Seattle Mariners. They compete in the Texas League and play their home games at Dickey–Stephens Park.

== See also ==
- Arkansas statistical areas
- Enola earthquake swarm
