= The Willows =

The Willows may refer to:

== Places ==
- The Willows, El Paso, Texas, USA
- The Willows, Queensland, a town in Australia
- The Willows, Salford, former home of Salford Rugby League club in Salford, England
- The Willows, Saskatoon, a residential community in Canada
- The Willows, Pretoria, a suburb in the east of Pretoria, South Africa

== Facilities and structures ==
Historic homes

- The Willows (Cavetown, Maryland), a historic farm complex on the U.S. National Register of Historic Places
- The Willows (Moorefield, West Virginia), a home on the U.S. National Register of Historic Places
- The Willows, the former mansion of Joseph Warren Revere in Fosterfields Farm, New Jersey

== Entertainment ==
- "The Willows" (story), a 1907 short story by Algernon Blackwood
- The Willows (album), a 2004 album by Belbury Poly
- The Willows (group), a 1950s doo wop group
- The Willows (English band), an English contemporary folk band from Cambridge, Cambridgeshire
- The Willows (trio), a Canadian musical trio based in Toronto, Ontario

== See also ==
- The Willowz, American rock band
- Willow (disambiguation)
