= Willow Tree =

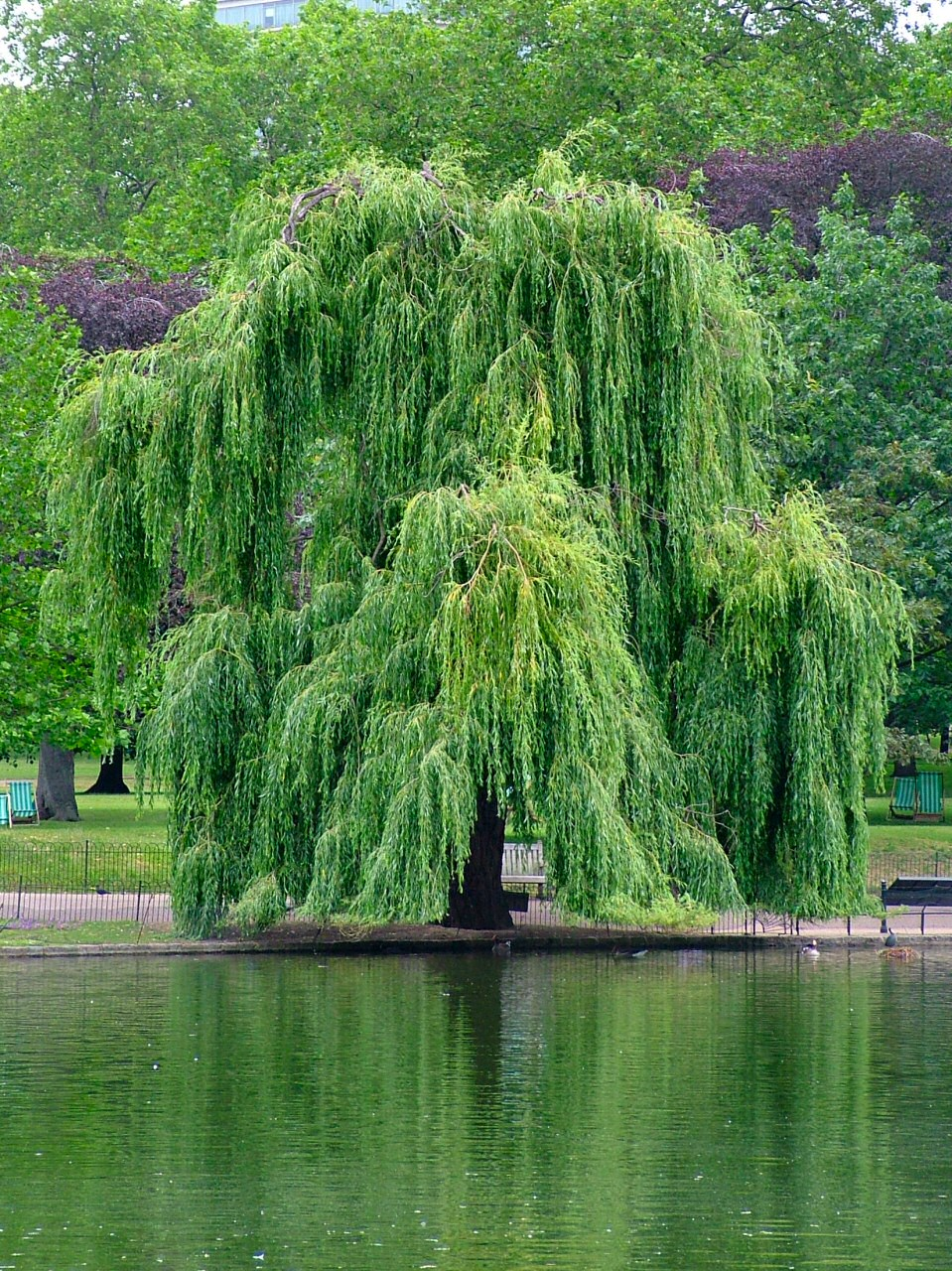
A willow tree.

Willows are a genus of trees.

Willow Tree may refer to:

== Arts and Entertainment ==
- "Willow Tree", a 2020 song by Tash Sultana
- The Willow Tree (novel), a 1998 novel by Hubert Selby, Jr.
- The Willow Tree (opera), a 1932 opera by Charles Wakefield Cadman and Nelle Richmond Eberhart
- The Willow Tree (2005 film), a 2005 Iranian film
- The Willow Tree (1920 film), a 1920 American silent film
- The Willow Tree (Rasputina album), a 2009 album
- "The Willow Tree", an alternate name for the folk song "Bury Me Beneath the Willow"

== Places ==
- Willow Tree, New South Wales, a village in Australia
- Willow Tree railway station, in Australia
- Willow Tree (LIRR station), a railway station in New York

== Other uses ==
- Willow Tree (figurines), a line of figurines

== See also ==
- Willow (disambiguation)
