= Ben Savage (disambiguation) =

Ben Savage (born 1980) is an American actor.

Ben Savage may also refer to:

- Ben Savage, guitarist for American deathcore band Whitechapel
- Ben Savage, member of English folk duo Hannah Sanders & Ben Savage
