= Willowdale Township =

Willowdale Township may refer to one of the following places in the United States:

- Willowdale Township, Dickinson County, Kansas
- Willowdale Township, Holt County, Nebraska

See also

- Willowdale (disambiguation)
- Willow Township (disambiguation)
