= Willow Springs =

Willow Springs or Willow Spring, may refer to:

== Places ==
- Willow Springs Township (disambiguation)

=== United States ===
- Willow Springs, Arizona
- Willow Springs Lake, Mogollon Rim, Arizona
- Willow Springs Canyon, Mogollon Rim, Arizona; see Willow Springs Lake
- Willow Springs, Illinois
  - Willow Springs School District 108, Willow Springs, Chicagoland, Illinois
- Willow Springs, a historic name for the location of Beloit, Kansas
- Willow Springs Township, Douglas County, Kansas
- Willow Springs, Missouri
- an early name for Raton, New Mexico
- Willow Springs, North Carolina; aka Willow Spring
- Willow Springs, Wisconsin
- Willow Springs, Wyoming in Natrona County

==== California ====
- Willow Springs, Kern County, California
  - Willow Springs International Motorsports Park, Willow Springs, Kern County, California
- Willow Springs Canyon, Los Angeles County, California
- Willow Springs Canyon Wash, Los Angeles County, California; see Willow Springs Canyon
- Willow Springs, Riverside County, California; see Willow Springs Station
- Willow Springs, Tuolumne County, California, on California State Route 108

==== Texas ====
- Willow Springs, Fayette County, Texas
- the original name of Greggton, Texas

== Other ==
- Willow Springs (film), a 1973 film by Werner Schroeter
- Willow Springs (journal), a literary journal of Eastern Washington University
- Willow Springs Center, Reno, Nevada, United States; a children's residential psychiatric hospital
- Willow Springs Distilling Company, Omaha, Nebraska, United States
- Willow Spring High School, Fuquay-Varina, Wake County, North Carolina, United States
- Willow Springs Station, Riverside County, California, United States
- Willow Springs station (Illinois), Willow Springs, Illinois, United States; in the Metra network
- Willow Springs Water Park, Little Rock, Arkansas, United States

== See also ==
- Willow (disambiguation)
- Spring (disambiguation)
