= Willow School =

Willow School may refer to:

- Willow Glen Elementary School (disambiguation)
- Willow Glen High School, public high school in the Willow Glen neighborhood of San Jose, California
- Willow Landing Elementary School, public school located in Barrie, Ontario, Canada
- The Willow School (Louisiana), charter school located in New Orleans, Louisiana
