= Willow Island =

Willow Island may refer to:

== Inhabited places ==
- Willow Island, Nebraska, U.S.
- Willow Island, West Virginia, U.S.

== Islands ==
- Willow Island (Illinois), one of the islands in Kankakee River State Park, Illinois, U.S.
- Willow Island (Washington), one of the islands that makes up the San Juan Islands off the coast of Washington, U.S.
- Willow Island (Wisconsin), on the grounds of the Alliant Energy Center, Madison, Wisconsin, U.S.
- One of several small man-made islands in Wascana Centre, Regina, Saskatchewan, Canada
- An island in the San Juan Islands National Wildlife Refuge, Washington, U.S.
- An island in Lake Worth in Texas, U.S.
- An island in Brandon Marsh, Warwickshire, England

== Other uses ==
- Willow Island disaster, the 1978 collapse of a cooling tower under construction at the Pleasants Power Station at Willow Island, West Virginia
- Willow Island Lock and Dam, on the Ohio River

== See also ==
- Willow (disambiguation)
