= Willow Lake =

Willow Lake may refer to:

In the United States (by state):

- Willow Lake (Saguache County, Colorado), an alpine lake
- Willow Lake (Marshallville, Georgia), a house listed on the National Register of Historic Places
- Willow Lake (Idaho), an alpine lake
- Willow Lake, Illinois, a census-designated place
- Willow Lake Township, Redwood County, Minnesota
- Willow Lake (Queens) in Flushing Meadows-Corona Park, Queens, New York
- Willow Lake (South Dakota), a lake in South Dakota
- Willow Lake, South Dakota, a city in South Dakota

In Canada:

- Willow Lake (Alberta), a lake in Wood Buffalo, Alberta; known as Gregoire Lake 1940–1995
