= Willow Park =

Willow Park may refer to:

- Willow Park, Alberta (locality), neighbourhood in Parkland County, Alberta, Canada
- Willow Park, Calgary, neighbourhood in Alberta, Canada
- Willow Park School, Dublin, primary school in Booterstown, Ireland
- Willow Park School, New Zealand, primary school in Hillcrest, Auckland, New Zealand
- Willow Park, Texas, a city in the United States
- Willow Park (The Owl House), a fictional character in the animated fantasy series The Owl House

== See also ==
- Willow Grove Park, amusement park in Willow Grove, Pennsylvania, United States from 1896 to 1976
- Willow River State Park, state park in Wisconsin, United States
- Willow Springs Water Park, water park in Little Rock, Arkansas, United States from 1928 to 2013
