= USCGC Willow =

Three cutters of the United States Coast Guard have been named Willow

- USCGC Willow (WAGL-253), a side paddle steamer originally built for service on the Mississippi River by the United States Lighthouse Service
- USCGC Willow (WAGL/WLB-332), a former United States Army mine planter
- USCGC Willow (WLB-202), a Juniper-class seagoing buoy tender
