= Ripley Landing, West Virginia =

- Unincorporated community
- Location within West Virginia Location within the United States
- Coordinates: 38°53′27″N 81°50′45″W
- Country: United States
- State: West Virginia
- County: Jackson
- Elevation: 584 ft (178 m)
- Time zone: UTC-5 (Eastern (EST))
  - Summer (DST): UTC-4 (EDT)
- Area codes: 304 & 681
- GNIS feature ID: 1549898

Ripley Landing is an unincorporated community in Jackson County, West Virginia, United States. Ripley Landing is located along West Virginia Route 2 near the confluence of the Ohio River and Mill Creek, 6.1 miles (9.8 km) southwest of Ravenswood. Ripley Landing once had a post office, which is now closed.
