= Willow Grove =

Willow Grove may refer to:

- Willow Grove (Greensboro, Maryland), listed on the NRHP in Maryland
- Willow Grove, Delaware, United States
- Willow Grove, Pittsgrove Township, New Jersey, United States
- Willow Grove, Pennsylvania, United States
- Willow Grove (Madison Mills, Virginia), listed on the NRHP in Virginia
- Willow Grove, New Brunswick, Canada
- Willow Grove Park, Pennsylvania
- Willow Grove Park Mall, a shopping mall in Willow Grove, Pennsylvania
- Willow Grove, West Virginia
- Willow Grove, Victoria, Australia
- Willow Grove (SEPTA station), station on the SEPTA Warminster Line
- Willow Grove Cemetery, New Brunswick, New Jersey, United States
- Naval Air Station Joint Reserve Base Willow Grove, Pennsylvania
- Camp Willow Grove, a US Army camp in the District of Arizona from 1866 to 1869
