= Weeping Willow =

Weeping willow is an ornamental tree (Salix babylonica and related hybrids)

Weeping willow or Weeping Willows may also refer to:

== Film and television ==
- Weeping Willow (film), a 2014 animated short film
- "Weeping Willow" (Law & Order: Criminal Intent), an episode of Law & Order: Criminal Intent
- "Weeping Willows" (CSI), an episode of CSI

== Music ==
- Weeping Willows (band), a Swedish pop rock group
- The Weeping Willows, an Australian country music group
- "Weeping Willow" (rag), a piano rag by Scott Joplin
- "Weeping Willow", a song by The Verve from Urban Hymns
- "Weeping Willow", a song by Sébastien Schuller
- "The Weeping Willow", an alternate name for the folk song "Bury Me Beneath the Willow"

== Other uses ==
- Grand Duke George Alexandrovich of Russia or Weeping Willow (1871–1899)
- Weeping Willow (Monet), a 1918 painting by Claude Monet
