= Willow Springs Township =

Willow Springs Township may refer to:

- Willow Springs Township, Douglas County, Kansas
- Willow Springs Township, Howell County, Missouri

== See also ==
- Willow Springs (disambiguation)
