= Gibson, Arkansas =

- CDP
- Location in Pulaski County and the state of Arkansas
- Coordinates: 34°52′56″N 92°14′02″W
- Country: United States
- State: Arkansas
- County: Pulaski

Area
  - Total: 4.79 sq mi (12.40 km^{2})
  - Land: 4.75 sq mi (12.31 km^{2})
  - Water: 0.031 sq mi (0.08 km^{2})
- Elevation: 341 ft (104 m)

Population (2020)
  - Total: 4,111
  - Density: 864.6/sq mi (333.83/km^{2})
- Time zone: UTC-6 (Central (CST))
  - Summer (DST): UTC-5 (CDT)
- ZIP code: 72120
- Area code: 501
- FIPS code: 05-26710
- GNIS feature ID: 2402522

Gibson is a census-designated place (CDP) in Pulaski County, Arkansas, United States. As of the 2020 census, Gibson had a population of 4,111. It is part of the Little Rock–North Little Rock–Conway Metropolitan Statistical Area.

Gibson contains the silver deposits that gave North Little Rock its older name of Argenta (derived from the Latin word for silver).

== History ==
Gibson was an early settlement in the Arkansas territory. The Southwest Trail military road, the route of most Americans headed to Mexico's Texas territory and the Republic of Texas, passed through Gibson. At one time, some 80 percent of Arkansas' settlers had arrived using the Southwest Trail.

Also known as the Old Military Road, the route passed from El Paso to North Little Rock through Gibson. From El Paso, Southwest Trail goes through current-day Arkansas Highway 89, then Tate's Mill Road to Batesville Pike Road through Gibson to Remount Road, to Arkansas Highway 176 and to Arkansas Highway 365 through North Little Rock.

After the Arkansas territorial capital was moved from Arkansas Post (Arkansas County) to Little Rock (Pulaski County) in 1821, settlers began to acquire land around the new capital, including land north of the Arkansas River. Most settlers were farmers growing cotton or subsistence crops. Many used land grants from the War of 1812 to take possession of land. Among the first to claim land in the future Gibson community were William Beech in 1821, William Johnson in 1822 and John Stone in 1822.

Gibson was the family name of some early of the area's settlers. Among Gibson Cemetery's dozens of graves are those of Mattie Cordelia Gibson, who died in 1915, and of her husband John Calvin, who died in 1951 on his 81st birthday.

Benjamin Kellogg became the most famous settler in the area. Born in New England (Massachusetts or Vermont) around 1797, Kellogg moved to Little Rock shortly after the city was established. A blacksmith by trade, Kellogg is credited with creating the broadaxe used to construct the Chandler home in Little Rock. This structure was the first hewed-log house in Little Rock. Earlier Little Rock homes were built of round poles.

Kellogg first bought land in northern Pulaski County in 1834 and later reported finding lead ore unearthed by tunneling crayfish. Kellogg bought more lots along the creek that now bears his name, but a mining corporation was formed that claimed to have leased mining rights to Kellogg's land for 99 years (Kellogg contended the lease was only to last five years). At least three mine shafts were dug, revealing small veins of silver, copper, lead and zinc. Kellogg died in 1848, and most miners left the next year for the richer promises of California gold mining.

Mines were still being worked early in the Civil War, but were abandoned before Major General Frederick Steele's Union forces passed by en route to Little Rock in 1863. The mines are described in the Goodspeed Publishing Company's "Biographical and Historical Memoirs of Central Arkansas", published in 1889, with descriptions of lead and copper ores and of attempts to locate gold. It appears the mines had been long abandoned by the time those accounts were published. An effort to reopen the mines in 1925 produced 3,118 troy ounces of silver valued at $2,164.

Pulaski County Judge C. T. Coffman proposed building a bridge across Kellogg Creek in 1905, but it did not come to fruition. The area remained sparsely settled until after World War II. Establishment of the Little Rock Air Force Base in nearby Jacksonville brought about considerable construction of houses and businesses.

== Geography ==
According to the United States Census Bureau, the CDP has a total area of 4.5 square miles (12 km^{2}), all land.

== Demographics ==
Historical population
Census	Pop.	Note	%±
2000	4,678		—
2010	3,543		−24.3%
2020	4,111		16.0%
U.S. Decennial Census

=== 2020 census ===
As of the 2020 census, Gibson had a population of 4,111. The median age was 38.5 years. 24.3% of residents were under the age of 18 and 14.0% were 65 years of age or older. For every 100 females, there were 97.6 males, and for every 100 females age 18 and over, there were 99.0 males age 18 and over.

82.9% of residents lived in urban areas, while 17.1% lived in rural areas.

There were 1,563 households in Gibson, including 1,243 families. Of all households, 34.0% had children under the age of 18 living in them, 53.5% were married-couple households, 17.3% were households with a male householder and no spouse or partner present, and 24.3% were households with a female householder and no spouse or partner present. About 21.0% of all households were made up of individuals, and 8.5% had someone living alone who was 65 years of age or older.

There were 1,658 housing units, of which 5.7% were vacant. The homeowner vacancy rate was 1.0% and the rental vacancy rate was 6.5%.

Gibson racial composition
Race	Number	Percentage
White (non-Hispanic)	2,773	67.45%
Black or African American (non-Hispanic)	719	17.49%
Native American	20	0.49%
Asian	29	0.71%
Pacific Islander	4	0.1%
Other/Mixed	297	7.22%
Hispanic or Latino	269	6.54%

=== 2000 census ===
As of the census of 2000, there were 4,678 people, 1,686 households, and 1,402 families residing in the CDP. The population density was 569.4 inhabitants per square mile (219.8/km^{2}). There were 1,745 housing units at an average density of 212.4 per square mile (82.0/km^{2}). The racial makeup of the CDP was 86.21% White, 8.89% Black or African American, 0.88% Native American, 0.58% Asian, 0.02% Pacific Islander, 1.15% from other races, and 2.27% from two or more races. 2.63% of the population were Hispanic or Latino of any race.

There were 1,686 households, out of which 39.4% had children under the age of 18 living with them, 67.8% were married couples living together, 12.2% had a female householder with no husband present, and 16.8% were non-families. 13.0% of all households were made up of individuals, and 3.9% had someone living alone who was 65 years of age or older. The average household size was 2.77 and the average family size was 3.03.

In the CDP, the population was spread out, with 27.2% under the age of 18, 8.7% from 18 to 24, 30.5% from 25 to 44, 26.1% from 45 to 64, and 7.5% who were 65 years of age or older. The median age was 35 years. For every 100 females, there were 97.6 males. For every 100 females age 18 and over, there were 95.5 males.

The median income for a household in the CDP was $46,705, and the median income for a family was $51,250. Males had a median income of $32,935 versus $25,291 for females. The per capita income for the CDP was $17,919. About 4.7% of families and 4.9% of the population were below the poverty line, including 3.5% of those under age 18 and 8.3% of those age 65 or over.

== Education ==
It is within the Pulaski County Special School District.

The area is divided between Cato and Sylvan Hills elementary schools. All of Gibson is zoned to Sylvan Hills Middle School and Sylvan Hills High School.

== See also ==
- Sherwood, Arkansas
