= Willow Township =

Willow Township may refer to:

== Arkansas ==
- Willow Township, Dallas County, Arkansas, in Dallas County, Arkansas

== Iowa ==
- Willow Township, Cherokee County, Iowa
- Willow Township, Crawford County, Iowa
- Willow Township, Greene County, Iowa
- Willow Township, Monona County, Iowa
- Willow Township, Woodbury County, Iowa

== Nebraska ==
- Willow Township, Antelope County, Nebraska

== North Dakota ==
- Willow Township, Griggs County, North Dakota, in Griggs County, North Dakota

== Oklahoma ==
- Willow Township, Caddo County, Oklahoma
- Willow Township, Greer County, Oklahoma

== Wisconsin ==
- Willow, Wisconsin

== See also ==
- Willow (disambiguation)
