= The Wind in the Willows (disambiguation) =

The Wind in the Willows is a 1908 children's book by Kenneth Grahame.

The Wind in the Willows may also refer to:

== Adaptations of the book ==
- The Wind in the Willows (1949 film), the first segment of the Disney animated package film The Adventures of Ichabod and Mr. Toad
- The Wind in the Willows (1983 film), a British stop-motion animated film produced by Cosgrove Hall
- The Wind in the Willows (TV series), a 1984–1990 British animated series by Cosgrove Hall
- Wind in the Willows (1985 musical), a 1985 Broadway musical by William P. Perry
- The Wind in the Willows (1987 film), an American animated film by Rankin/Bass
- Wind in the Willows (1988 film), an animated television film from Burbank Films Australia
- The Wind in the Willows (play), a 1990 play written by Alan Bennett
- The Wind in the Willows (1995 film), a British animated television film directed by Dave Unwin
- The Wind in the Willows (1996 film), a British live-action film by Terry Jones
- The Wind in the Willows (2006 film), a British-Canadian live-action television film
- The Wind in the Willows (2016 musical), a 2016 British musical written by Julian Fellowes

== Music ==
- The Wind in the Willows (band), a folk rock band that included Debbie Harry
- "Wind in the Willows", a song written by Alan Bell and performed by many artists, including Blackmore's Night from Under a Violet Moon
- The Wind in the Willows, a composition by Johan de Meij
