= Weeping Willow (film) =

Turkish animated short film

- Film poster
- Turkish: Salkım Söğüt
- Directed by: Ethem Onur Bilgiç
- Produced by: Berat İlk
- Music by: James Hakan Dedeoğlu
- Production company: Mimar Sinan Fine Arts University
- Release date: September 2014
- Running time: 4 minutes
- Country: Turkey

Weeping Willow (Turkish: Salkım Söğüt) is a 2014 Turkish animated short film directed by Ethem Onur Bilgiç, and produced by Mimar Sinan Fine Arts University. It is an animated free adaptation of the Nâzım Hikmet poem, "Salkımsöğüt".

== Plot ==
The film follows a man; who fought through his entire life. He rode from one attack to another, marching on his horse. He is shown to be a brave soldier, who fought with his pride. But as the film continues, the soldier ponders if it was time to watch the soldiers going along the setting sun under the shade of Weeping Willow.

== Awards ==
- 21st International Golden Boll Film Festival, the Best Animated Short Film
- 15th International İzmir Short Film Festival, the Best Animated Short Film

== See also ==
- Nâzım Hikmet
