= Wildwood Park for the Arts =

Botanical garden & arts center in Little Rock, Arkansas

Coordinates: 34°44′10″N 92°19′20″W

Wildwood Park for the Arts is a developing botanical garden and center for the arts located in western Little Rock, Arkansas's Chenal Valley. Its mission is to challenge the intellect, engage the imagination and celebrate the human spirit through encounters with nature and a full spectrum of the cultural arts: visual arts, performing, literary, horticulture, culinary and more.

Gardens on the 104-acre woodland site include the Richard C. Butler Arboretum, the Gertrude Remmel Butler Gazebo and Gardens (a project of the Chenal Valley Garden Club), the Ruth Allen Dogwood Trail, the Boop Water Garden, the Carl Hunter Wildflower Glen, the Bruce Theatre Gardens, the Doris Carre Gay Asian Garden (a project of the Pulaski County Master Gardeners), the Campbell Davies Reflection Garden and an 8-acre (32,000 m^{2}) swan lake. Paved walking trails provide access to all areas of the park.

In addition to the 625-seat Lucy Lockett Cabe Theatre, the park includes a studio theatre complex, production facilities, and the park's administrative offices.
