= USCGC Willow (WAGL-253) =

History

United States
- Name: Willow
- Builder: Dubuque Boat and Boiler Works
- Commissioned: October 4, 1927
- Decommissioned: March 1, 1945
- Renamed: (1973) Good Life Showboat
- Fate: Sunk

General characteristics
- Class & type: Side-wheel steamer
- Displacement: 1070 tons (freshwater)
- Length: 200 ft (61 m)
- Beam: 65 ft (20 m)
- Draft: >8 ft (2.4 m)

Willow was a side-wheel steamship built in 1924–27 to resemble a 19th-century Mississippi riverboat. She originally served on the Mississippi as a buoy tender, later as a berthing hulk, and later still was rebuilt as a showboat.

== United States Lighthouse Service ==
The Willow was commissioned into the U.S. Lighthouse Service on October 7, 1927. Captain Thomas B. Good prepared her original design, which was modified by the U.S. Navy; the modifications led to her drawing significantly more water than desired. Captain Good took command in April 1928. She was home-ported at Memphis, Tennessee, and overwintered in New Orleans. Because she was underpowered, her spring departure upriver was sometimes delayed because she could not travel against the strong early season currents of the Mississippi. Her principal duty was installation and maintenance of navigation aids such as buoys, channel markers, fog horns, and beacons. Much of the work had to be done from ship's boats because her deep draft often kept her away from the shore.

== United States Coast Guard ==
The U.S Lighthouse Service was merged into the U.S. Coast Guard in 1939 and Willow received her designation as the cutter WAGL-253. Her duties remained the same as before the merger. She had a racially integrated crew and "a family atmosphere". One incident is known from her USCG period: On December 15, 1944, she and LST-841 collided and both sustained damage. On March 1, 1945, Willow was decommissioned by the Coast Guard and transferred to the U.S. Army Corps of Engineers.

== United States Army Corps of Engineers ==
The Corps of Engineers removed all of Willow's propulsion gear including the sidewheels. The Corps also removed the original small pilothouse from atop the second deck and added a full third deck. She then served as living quarters for work crews. In late World War II and for a time after, some of the crews were German POWs. The Corps sold Willow in 1962.

== Private ownership ==
The Willow's first private owner was A.J. Baron, who intended to convert her to a floating hotel and restaurant. He was unable to reach that goal and in 1965 sold Willow to W.S. Young Construction. Young Construction towed her to New Orleans but she was run aground in LaPlace, Louisiana, by hurricane Betsy in September 1965. Abandoned there, she suffered from weather and vandals until seized by the U.S. Marshalls Service, which sold her to a Frieda Parker at auction. Parker sold her to Belizian Industries who intended to use her as a lobster factory in what was then British Honduras. That plan also did not materialize.

A Paul Jennings purchased Willow in 1973 and renamed her The Good Life Showboat. He intended to make her into a museum and park before the 1976 Bicentennial. That plan ended when in September 1975 hurricane Eloise drove her aground in Panama City Beach, Florida. The next owner, a Bob Snow, bought her in 1979, freed her from the beach, and towed her to Bayou Chico near Pensacola, Florida. He wanted to make her an attraction at the 1984 Louisiana World Exposition (Note: The Patrick article says 1982, but that year's World's Fair was in Knoxville, TN.) but was unable to do so.

In February 1989 the former Willow was bought by a United Kingdom based leisure company. They refloated her in July 1989 and transported her to Belgium on a heavy lift ship. At Nieuwe Schelderwrven Shipyards she was restored to an approximation of her original Mississippi riverboat appearance. As of late 1991 the plan was to moor her on the River Thames in London opposite HMS Belfast.

Little is known about the Willow after 1991. However, by June 2018 she was moored to a pier in the harbor of Benalmádena, Andalusia, Spain. A photograph taken there in March 2019 shows her partially sunk at the mooring.

At the end of April 2023, reports in the local press appeared stating that the vessel was to be impounded by the marina authorities and sent for scrapping.

In March 2025 the vessel has been partially broken up in the Marina. The superstructure has all been removed from the hull, which lies just below the surface.

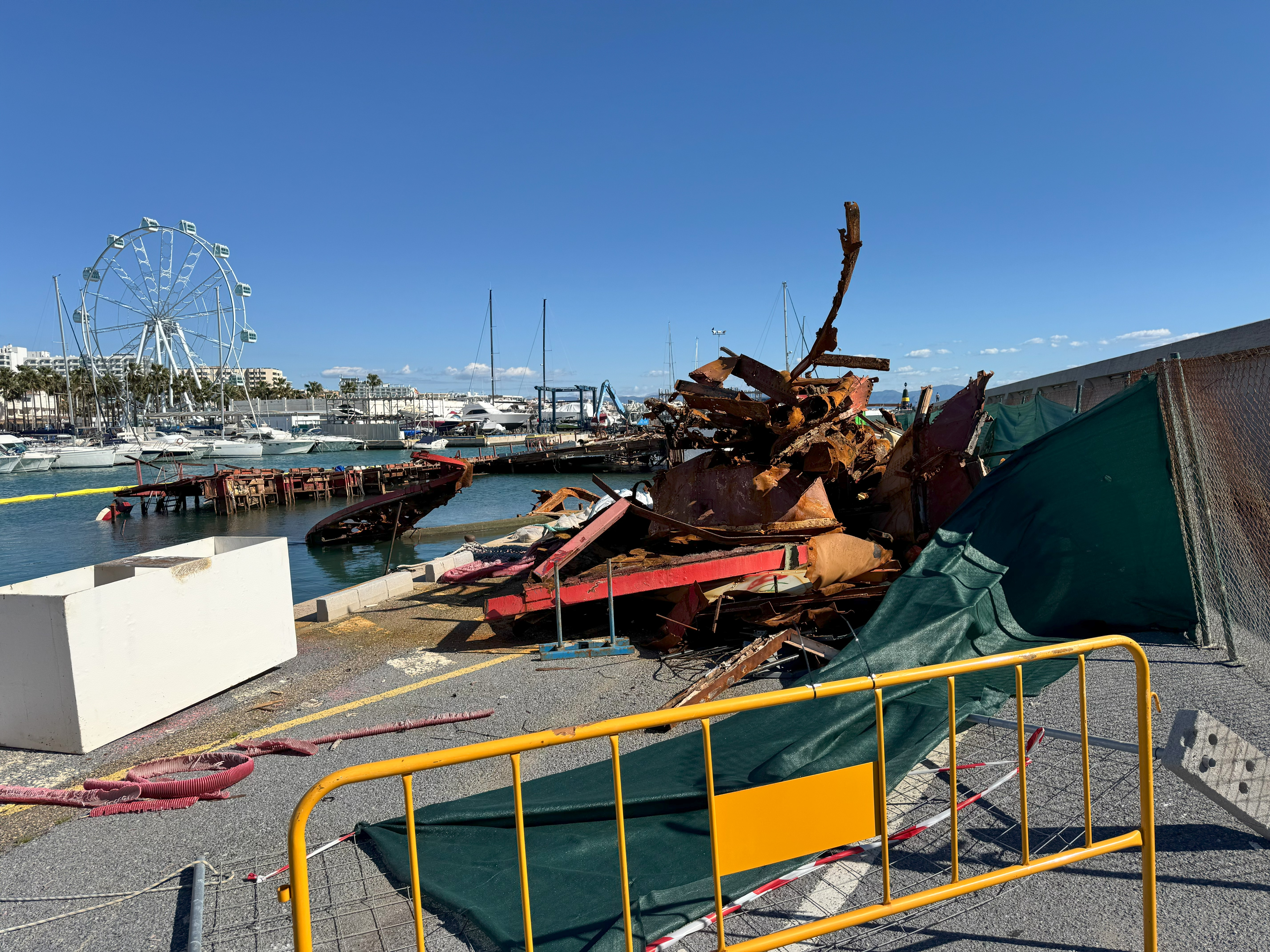
