= Willow Grove, West Virginia =

- Unincorporated community
- Location within West Virginia Location within the United States
- Coordinates: 38°56′0″N 81°50′9″W
- Country: United States
- State: West Virginia
- County: Jackson
- Elevation: 591 ft (180 m)
- Time zone: UTC-5 (Eastern (EST))
  - Summer (DST): UTC-4 (EDT)
- GNIS ID: 1560088

Willow Grove was an unincorporated community in Jackson County, West Virginia.
