= Willow Hill =

Willow Hill may refer to:

- Willow Hill, Music Artist, United Kingdom
- Willow Hill, Illinois, United States
- Willow Hill Township, Jasper County, Illinois
- Willow Hill, Pennsylvania
- Willow Hill Covered Bridge, covered bridge located off U.S. Route 30 that spans Miller’s Run in Lancaster County, Pennsylvania
