= Willow Glen Elementary School =

Willow Glen Elementary School may refer to:

- Willow Glen Elementary School, located in the San Jose Unified School District, California
- Willow Glen Elementary School, located in the Visalia Unified School District, California
