= Willow Lake (Saguache County, Colorado) =

Lake in Saguache County, Colorado

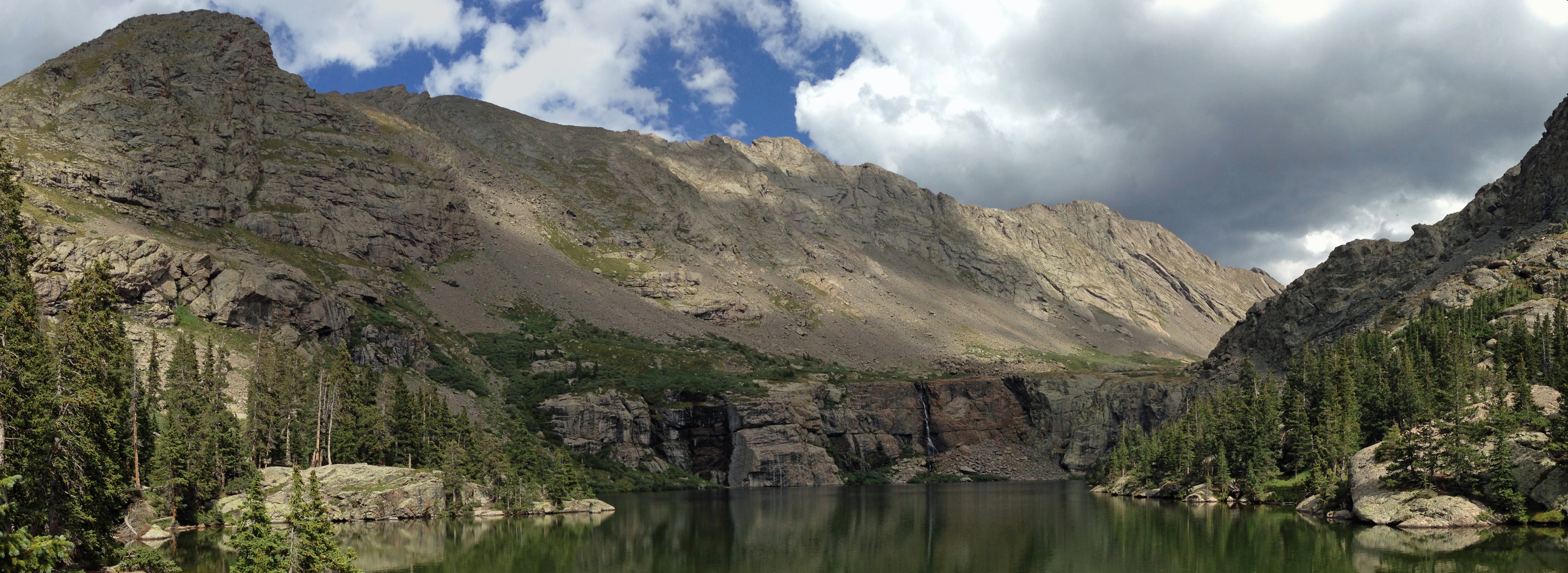

- Location within Colorado Location within the United States
- Location: Saguache County, Colorado
- Coordinates: 37°59′39″N 105°36′31″W
- Type: Glacial
- Primary inflows: Willow Creek
- Primary outflows: Willow Creek
- Basin countries: United States
- Max. length: 0.26 mi (0.42 km)
- Max. width: 0.12 mi (0.19 km)
- Surface elevation: 11,580 ft (3,530 m)

Willow Lake, also known as the lower Willow Creek Lake, is an alpine lake in Saguache County, Colorado, United States, located in the Sangre de Cristo Range within the Sangre de Cristo Wilderness in Rio Grande National Forest. The lake is accessed from the Willow Lake Trail (trail 865) at the South Crestone Lake Trailhead east of Crestone, Colorado. Willow Lake is directly north of Challenger Point and south of Mount Adams. Willow Creek is both the inflow and outflow to the lake, and there are waterfalls at both lake's inflow and outflow.

== Gallery ==
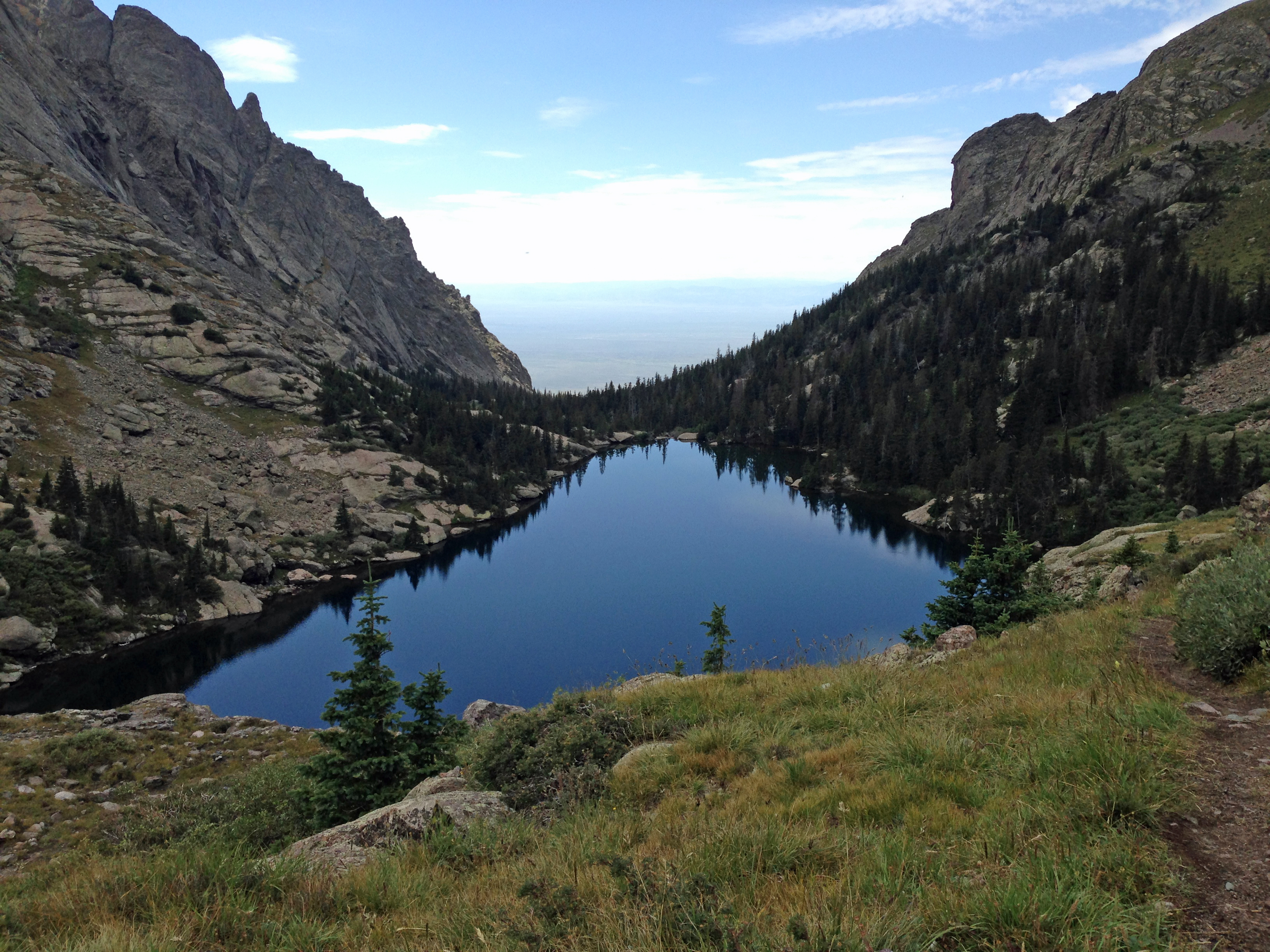
Willow Lake from the eastern (upstream) side

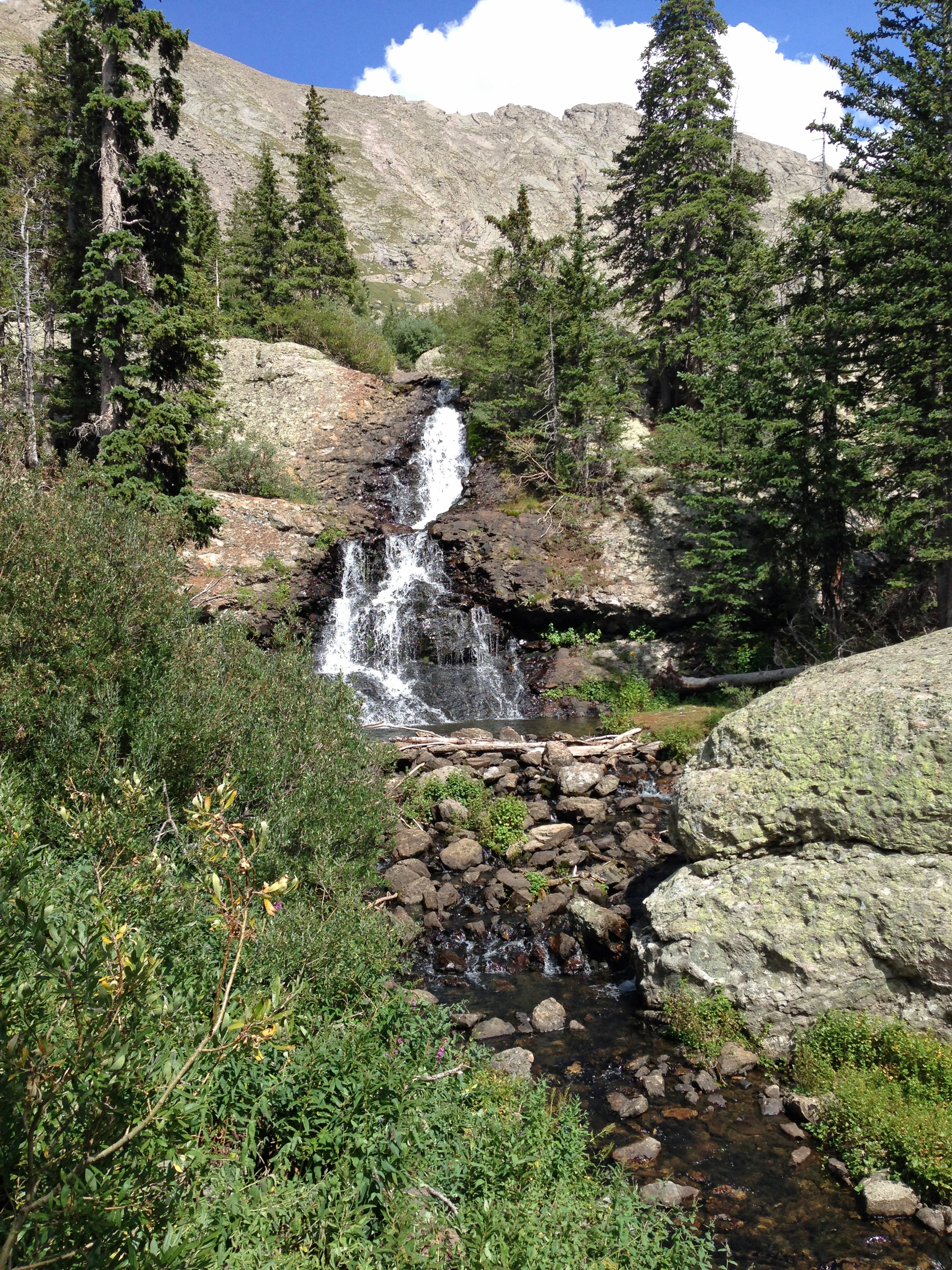
The waterfall at the downstream side of Willow Lake
