= The Willows (English band) =

English contemporary folk band

The Willows are an English, mixed-gender, six-piece, contemporary folk music band who are based in Cambridge, Cambridgeshire. According to Neil Spencer of The Observer, their music is "polished Anglo-Americana folk" that owes "a clear debt to Fairport Convention ... but their newgrass leanings make Alison Krauss's Union Station as good a comparison". The Daily Telegraph named the band's second album Amidst Fiery Skies one of the best folk albums of 2014.

The Willows formed in 2010 in Cambridge and released their debut Extended Play (EP) the following year. The band then consisted of vocalist Jade Rhiannon – also called Jade Ward; her husband Cliff Ward on banjo and guitar; Prue Ward on fiddle; Ben Savage on Dobro, vocals and guitar; and Stephen MacLachlan on piano, vocals and percussion. The Willows' debut album Beneath our Humble Soil was released in 2012. Evan Carson replaced MacLachlin for their second album Amidst Fiery Skies (2014), and by the 2018 release of their third album Through the Wild, Katriona Gilmore had replaced Prue Ward on fiddle and double-bassist John Parker had been added to the lineup.

== Members ==
=== Current ===
- Evan Carson – drums, bodhran and percussion
- Katriona Gilmore – fiddle
- Jade Rhiannon (also credited as Jade Ward) – vocals, guitar and shruti box
- Ben Savage – guitar, vocals and dobro
- Cliff Ward – guitar, banjo, vocals and fiddle/violin

=== Former ===
- Stephen MacLachlan – percussion, piano and vocals
- Prue Ward – fiddle/violin and vocals
- John Parker – double bass

== Discography ==
=== Albums ===
- Beneath our Humble Soil (2012)
- Amidst Fiery Skies (2014)
- Through the Wild (2018)

=== Extended Play ===
- The Willows (2011)
