= Willow Run (disambiguation) =

Willow Run was a factory near Ypsilanti, Michigan in the United States that manufactured B-24 Liberator bombers during World War II.

Willow Run may also refer to:

- Willow Run Airport, a cargo and general aviation airport on the site of the former aircraft plant
  - Willow Run, Michigan, an unincorporated community established at the airport
- Willow Run Assembly, a former General Motors plant on the site of the former aircraft plant
- Willow Run Transmission, a General Motors factory on the site of the former aircraft plant
- Willow Run Laboratories, founded in 1946 as the Michigan Aeronautical Research Center, which in 1972 became the Environmental Research Institute of Michigan, after separating from the University of Michigan
- Willow Run (Husbands Run tributary), a stream in New Castle County, Delaware
