= Willow Valley =

Willow Valley may refer to:

- Willow Valley, Arizona, United States
- Willow Valley, California, United States
- Willow Valley Township, Minnesota, United States
