= Hannah Sanders & Ben Savage =

English folk music duo

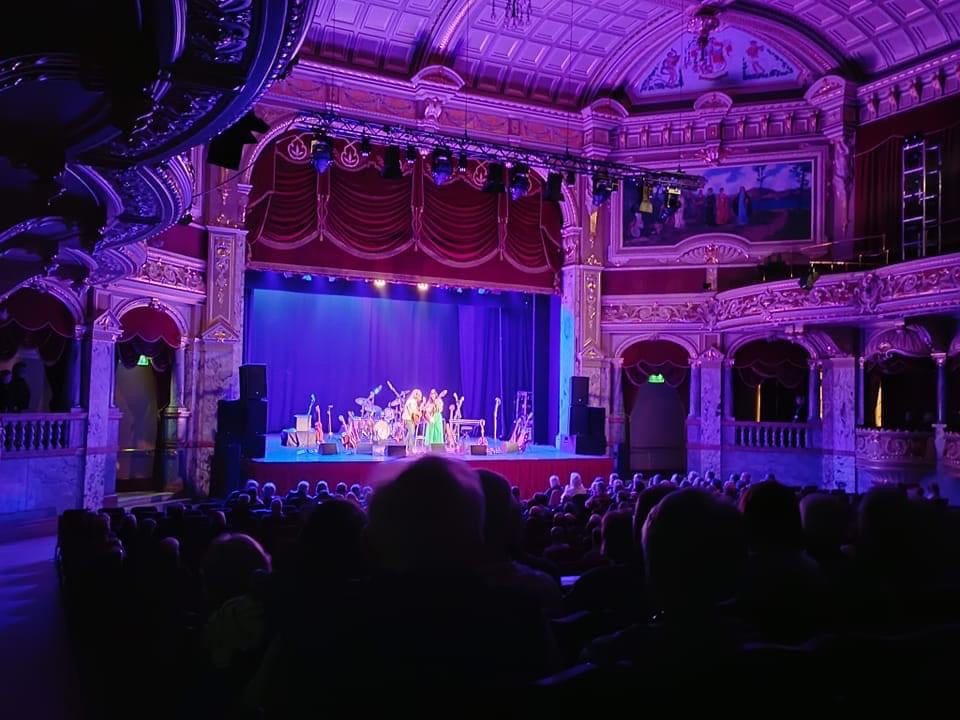

Background information
- Origin: East Anglia, England
- Genre: Folk
- Instruments: Vocals, acoustic guitar, dobro, appalachian dulcimer
- Years active: 2015–present
- Labels: Topic, Sungrazing
- Members: Hannah Sanders; Ben Savage
- Website: www.hannahbenmusic.com

Hannah Sanders & Ben Savage are an English folk roots duo originating from East Anglia. They were formed in 2015 following a chance meeting at a Cambridge folk club. The duo have recorded five studio albums, released by Sungrazing Records and Topic Records. They are renowned for their intimate live shows around a single microphone, although 2024 saw them tour their 4th album In The Dark We Grow as a 5-piece band.

== Biography ==
Hannah and Ben met by chance at a folk club in Cambridge in 2013. Hannah had recently moved to the area following a number of years in North America and Ben had just returned from a tour with folk rock band The Willows. They collaborated on Hannah's debut album, Charms Against Sorrow, and began working on duet material during the accompanying tour for the album.

Their debut album as a duo, Before The Sun was released in 2015. The album was recorded and produced in Toronto by David Travers-Smith; a partnership the duo continued for Awake in 2018. Ben Savage took over production duties in 2022 for their Topic Records debut Ink of the Rosy Morning, recorded in an old school house in Hastings, England during the COVID-19 pandemic. The album entered the UK Official Folk Albums Chart at number three on 3 May 2022.

The duo toured extensively with folk rock band Fairport Convention in 2023, an experience that inspired the expanded soundscapes of their 2024 album, In The Dark We Grow, which features collaborations with Jon Thorne, Jess Morgan, Findlay Napier and Gillian Frame. The album was dedicated to the late Johnny Dickinson, a guitarist and songwriter from Northumbria.

Fifth album, The Strangers' Share was recorded over 5 days in the West Country and explores themes of dreams and the supernatural.

They formed festive folk band, A Winter Union, in 2015, originally with members of Megson and The WIllows. The band released their first studio album, Sooner After Solstice in 2023.

== Musical style ==
The duo take influence from British and American folk traditions, often including folk songs from both sides of the Atlantic on their albums, alongside their own compositions.

Their style has been likened to Gillian Welch and David Rawlings and Sanders' voice likened to Joni Mitchell and Judy Collins.

Their expanded band line up for live shows in 2023 was compared to the likes of Pentangle and Grateful Dead.

== Discography ==
=== Albums ===
- Before The Sun (2015)
- Awake (2018)
- Ink of the Rosy Morning (2022)
- In The Dark We Grow (2024)
- The Strangers' Share (2025)

=== EPs ===
- New Moon Sessions Vol 1 (2018)

=== With A Winter Union ===
- A Winter Union (2016)
- Live in Concert (2019)
- Sooner After Solstice (2023)
- Live Before Solstice (2024)

=== With Hannah Sanders (Solo) ===
- Charms Against Sorrow (2015)
