= Willow Tree (figurines) =

Line of sculptures by Susan Lord

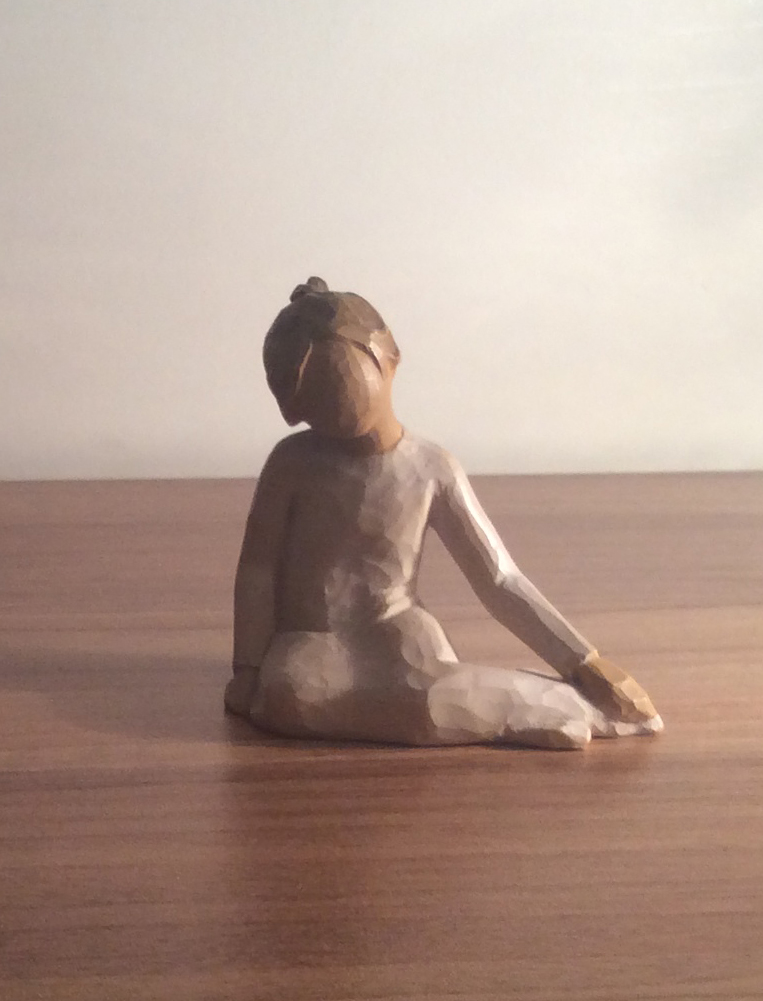
Willow Tree

Willow Tree is a line of figurine sculptures created by artist Susan Lordi in January 2000.

== Overview ==
The Willow Tree line is made up rustic faceless people and angels (and also dogs and cats) intended to represent feelings or life events. The figurines, which include a nativity scene, are made from hand-painted resin which is cast from Lordi's hand-carved clay sculptures.

Lordi partnered with the Demdaco company to produce, market and distribute Willow Tree figurines. The line is available nationwide in independent gift shops and Hallmark stores. It is often a top seller.

== Lawsuits ==
Creator Susan Lordi filed a lawsuit against CVS Pharmacy in for selling figurines that she alleged were plagiarized from her designs. CVS had produced their own line of angel figures with wire-loop wings, which Lordi characterized as imitating a feature of her designs. In her lawsuit, she reported her monthly sales as $4.6 million in the US

== See also ==
- Primitive decorating
- Nativity scene
- Figurine
