= Community Theatre of Little Rock =

Organization based in Little Rock, Arkansas

- Formation: 1956
- Type: Theatre group
- Purpose: Musical theatre Drama theatre Comedy theatre
- Location(s): The Studio Theatre and Lobby Bar, 328 West 7th Street, Little Rock, Arkansas
- Website: www.ctlr-act.org

Community Theatre of Little Rock is a non-profit organization based in Little Rock, Arkansas and founded in 1956. It is a completely volunteer-driven organization.

== History ==
Founded in 1956, Community Theatre of Little Rock (CTLR) is Central Arkansas' Oldest and finest theater tradition.

Since its inception, CTLR has performed in many venues in Little Rock. In the very early years, The Parish Hall at 9th and Louisiana, Trinity Parish Hall, Robinson (Center) Auditorium, a renovated feedstore at 609 Center Street and The Medical Center Auditorium provided performance stages. In the 1960s and 1970s, National Investors Life Building, the Arkansas Arts Center, Student Union became venues. The 1980s found the troupe performing again in the Arkansas Arts Center, UALR, the UALR, The Arkansas Repertory Theatre, Little Rock Garden Council and Hall High School. Capital Keyboard Theatre became home until the Arkansas School for the Blind offered the use of Woolly Auditorium from 2002 to 2008. In 2008 Community Theatre of Little Rock moved to the PUBLIC Theatre and stayed there until July 1, 2014, when they joined The Studio Theatre and Lobby Bar in the heart of Downtown Little Rock, Arkansas.

== Current venue ==
In the Summer of 2014, Community Theatre of Little Rock broke ties with The PUBLIC Theatre and joined The Studio Theatre and Lobby Bar.

== Programs ==
Community Theatre of Little Rock has presented over 200 mainstage productions since its inception in 1956. Future endeavors include classes in basic acting, dance, singing, set design/construction, and prop manufacturing.

== Productions - a few examples ==
=== 1950s ===
- Biggest Thief in Town
- Wake Up, Darling
- Dracula
- Roomful of Roses

=== 1990s ===
- Philadelphia Story
- Neil Simon's Rumors

=== 1960s ===
- Agatha Christie's The Moustrap
- Glass Menagerie
- You Can't Take it With You
- Gypsy

=== 1970s ===
- If Men Played Cards as Women Do
- The Caine Mutiny Court Martial
- Hello, Dolly!
- The Miracle Worker

=== 1980s ===
- Annie Get Your Gun
- The Dining Room
- The Curse of An Aching Heart
- Damn Yankees

=== 1990s ===
- Our Town
- A Murder is Announced
- On Golden Pond
- The Man Who Came To Dinner
- Philadelphia Story
- Neil Simon's Rumors

=== 2000s ===
- Cotton Patch Gospel
- Once Upon a Mattress
- Arsenic & Old Lace
- Scrooge: The Musical

=== 2010s ===
- Five Women Wearing the Same Dress
- Dirty Rotten Scoundrels
- The Crucible
- A Few Good Men
- Moonlight and Magnolias
- Hairspray
