= The Willows (trio) =

Canadian musical trio

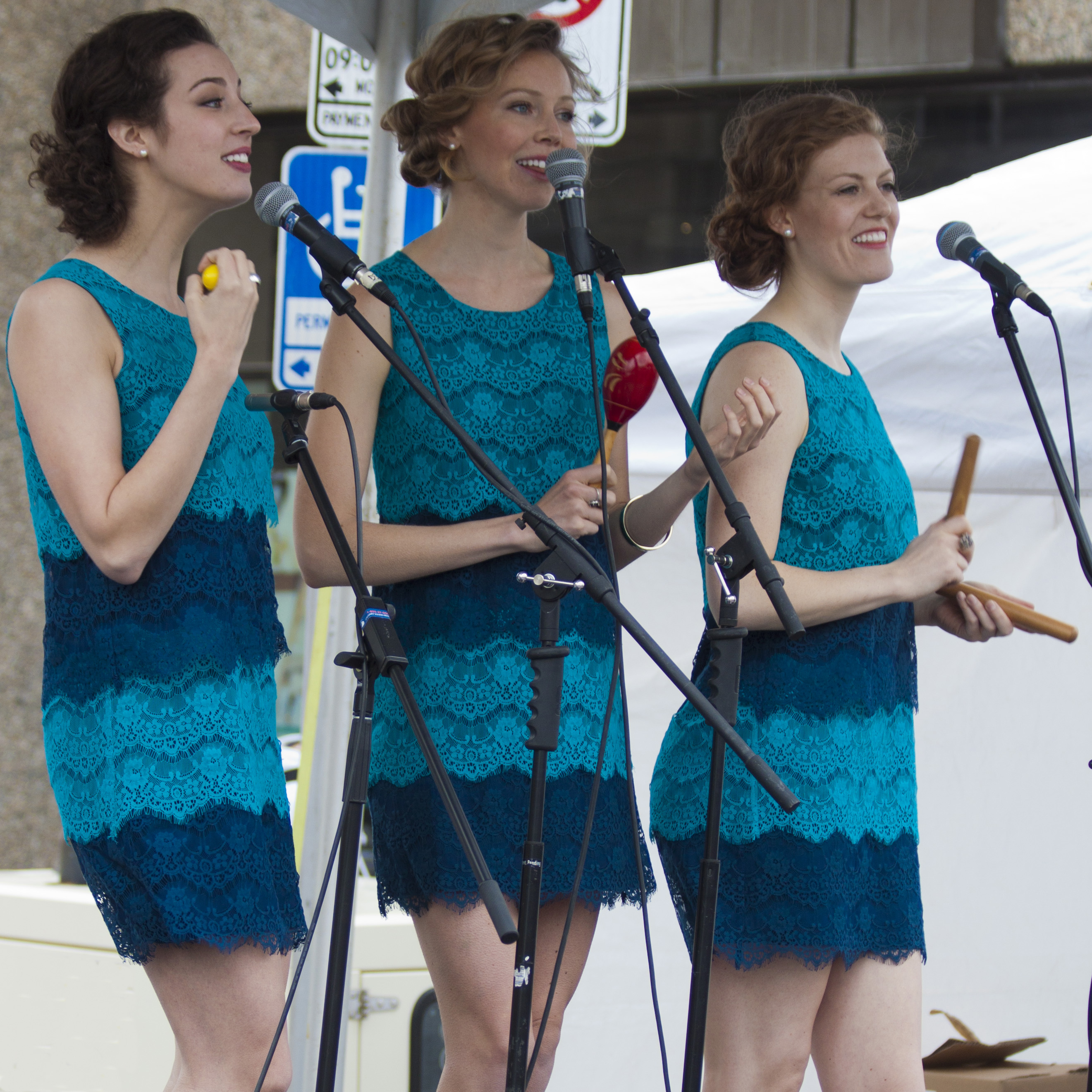
- Andrea Gregorio (left), Lauren Pedersen, and Krista Deady performing in Calgary (2014)

Background information
- Genres: Jazz
- Labels: Flatcar Records
- Members: Andrea Gregorio; Lauren Pedersen; Krista Deady
- Website: thewillowstrio.com

The Willows are a Canadian musical trio based in Toronto, Ontario, made up of Andrea Gregorio, Lauren Pedersen, and Krista Deady. According to Raul da Gama of Toronto Music Report the trio have a "a vocal configuration similar to the legendary Andrews Sisters."

== Origins ==
All three members grew up together in Edmonton, Alberta, and went to college together in Toronto. They met taking ballet in Edmonton at age nine. They attended the Edmonton Dance Centre from age twelve onward. They were all accepted to Ryerson University in 2008 to study dance. While there, they formed the trio in 2010, before graduating with Bachelor of Fine Arts dance degrees in 2012.

== Musical career ==
The sound of the Willows is described as classic jazz with mucho swing.

=== This is Christmas ===
The debut album, This is Christmas, was released in 2015. It mainly featured covers of popular Christmas songs, but also included a few original works.

=== Tea for Three ===
The Willows released their second full length album, Tea for Three, in 2017. The writing for the album was done by Lauren Pedersen and Chris Graham, Lauren Pedersen arranged all of the vocals. This was their first album featuring all-original tunes.

Tea for Three
No.	Title	Length
1.	"Breakfast in Bed"	2:25
2.	"Fuddy Duddy"	3:05
3.	"Wishing Well"	3:40
4.	"What Are You Waiting For?"	3:34
5.	"Boy Oh Boy"	3:29
6.	"Old Friend"	2:24
7.	"Dancin’"	3:03
8.	"Dear Gussy"	2:35
9.	"Valentine"	3:17
10.	"Tea For Three"	2:59
11.	"By The Window"	3:06
12.	"Bathtub Gin"	2:04
13.	"Never Judge"	3:19
Total length:		40:21
