= The Willows, Saskatoon =

The Willows
- City of Saskatoon neighbourhood
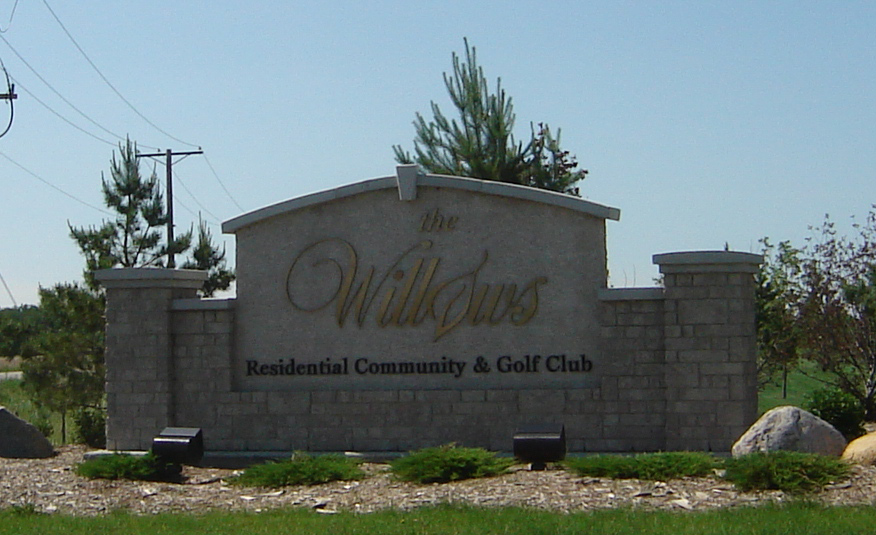
- Entrance sign to The Willows
- Interactive map of The Willows
- Coordinates: 52°4′39″N 106°39′30″W
- Country: Canada
- Province: Saskatchewan
- City: Saskatoon
- Suburban Development Area: Nutana
- Neighbourhood: The Willows
- Annexed: 2003
- Construction: 2004-

Government
  - Type: Municipal (Ward 7)
  - Administrative body: Saskatoon City Council
  - Councillor: Mairin Loewen
- Time zone: UTC-6 (UTC)

The Willows Residential Community and Golf Club, is a residential community in the Nutana Suburban Development Area in the city of Saskatoon, Saskatchewan. The Willows is south of Circle Drive which is concurrent with Saskatchewan Highway 16. Its northern boundary is the CN Rail line and the former Cartwright Street right-of-way (the street was subsequently rerouted through the community as part of its development); to the east is Clarence Avenue and to the west is Lorne Avenue. The 36-hole Willows Golf & Country Club winds its way around the subdivision which when construction of homes began in 2004 became the city's first golf course community. Home construction began almost immediately after the land for the subdivision and the golf course was annexed from the rural municipality of Corman Park No. 344, Saskatchewan. The golf course, however, had been in operation for more than a decade before residential development began.

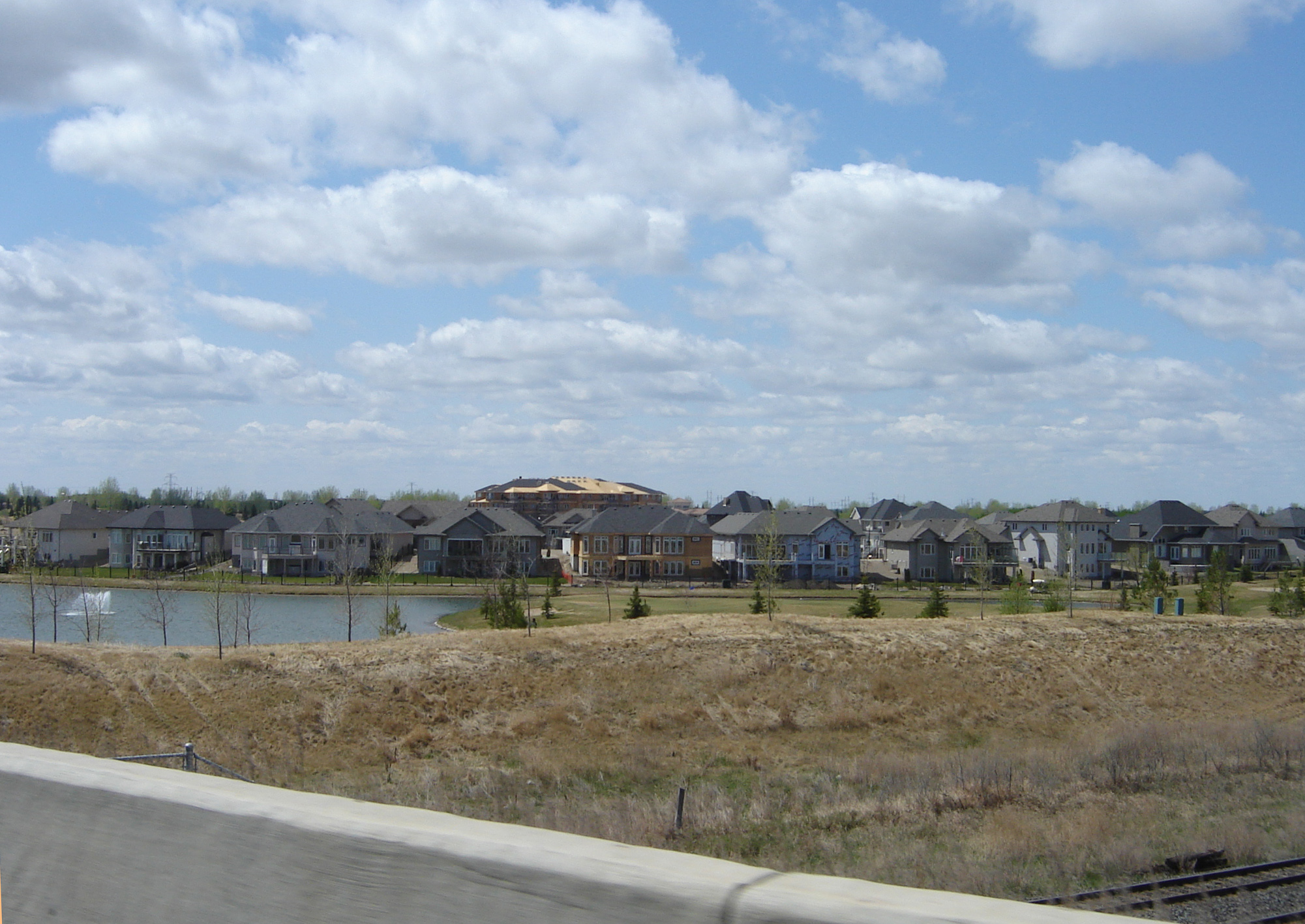
Skyline in The Willows

== Transportation ==
Access to The Willows is via Cartwright Street from Lorne or Clarence avenues. An overpass over the CN rail line was built on Clarence in the mid-2000s to facilitate access, and access to the area was further enhanced with the construction of the Clarence Avenue and Circle Drive interchange which was completed in 2007.

== Government and politics ==
The Willows exists within the federal electoral district of Saskatoon—Grasswood. It is currently represented by Kevin Waugh of the Conservative Party of Canada, first elected in 2015.

Provincially, the area is within the constituency of Saskatoon Stonebridge-Dakota. It is currently represented by Bronwyn Eyre of the Saskatchewan Party, first elected in 2016.

In Saskatoon's non-partisan municipal politics, The Willows lies within ward 7. It is currently represented by Councillor Mairin Loewen, who was elected to city council in a 2011 by-election.

== Layout ==
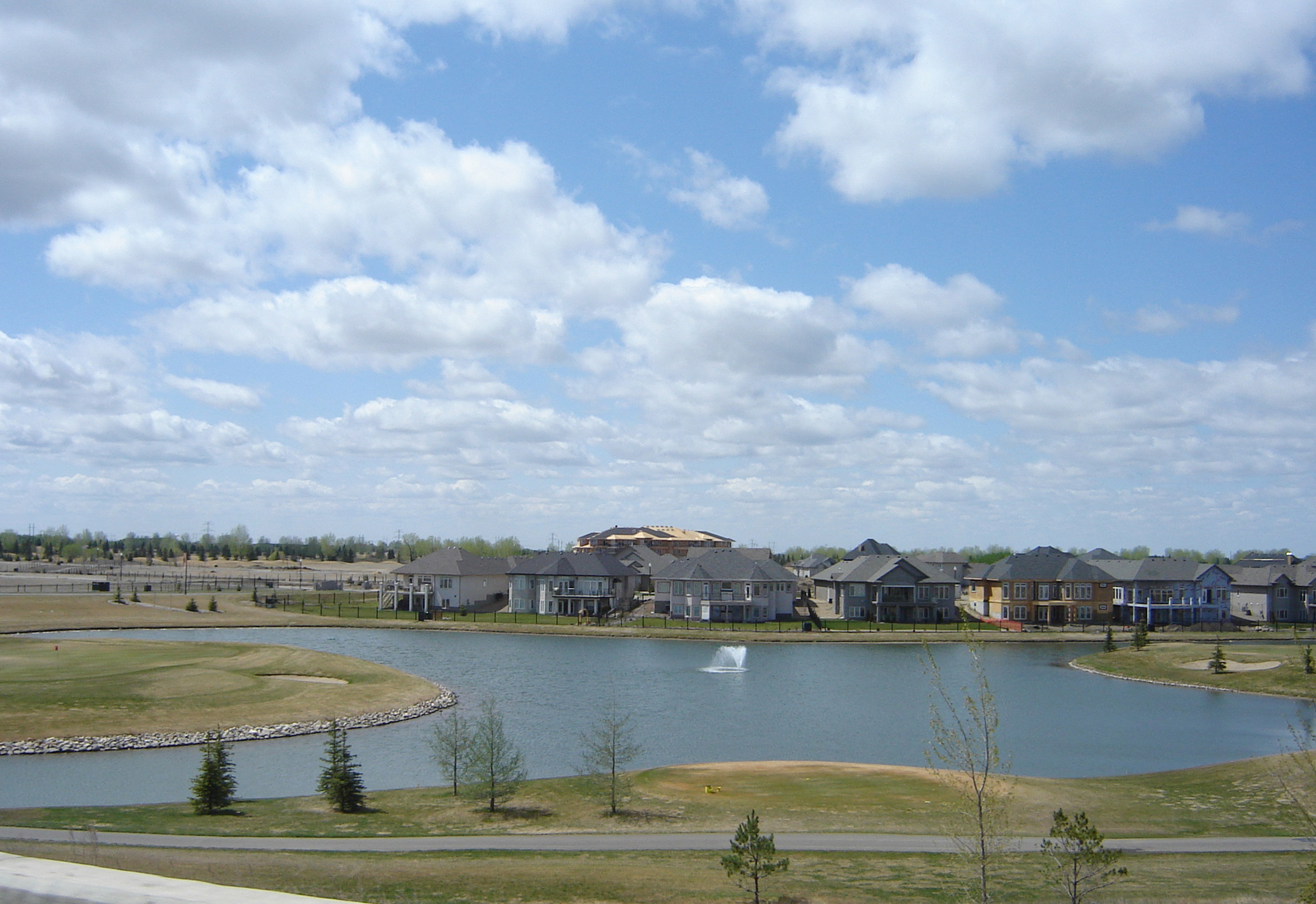
The Willows

The roads are laid out in a court system styling. As of April 2008 only Cartwright Street and Cartwright Terrace had been assigned names. Future plans for the community show a further residential development on the west side of the golf course, accessed only from Lorne Avenue.

== Shopping ==
The nearest shopping to The Willows is the Stonegate Shopping Centre with Wal-Mart as an anchor to the north east of The Willows subdivision. Additional shopping areas have developed around Stonegate since its construction in 2007–2008.

== Recreation facilities ==
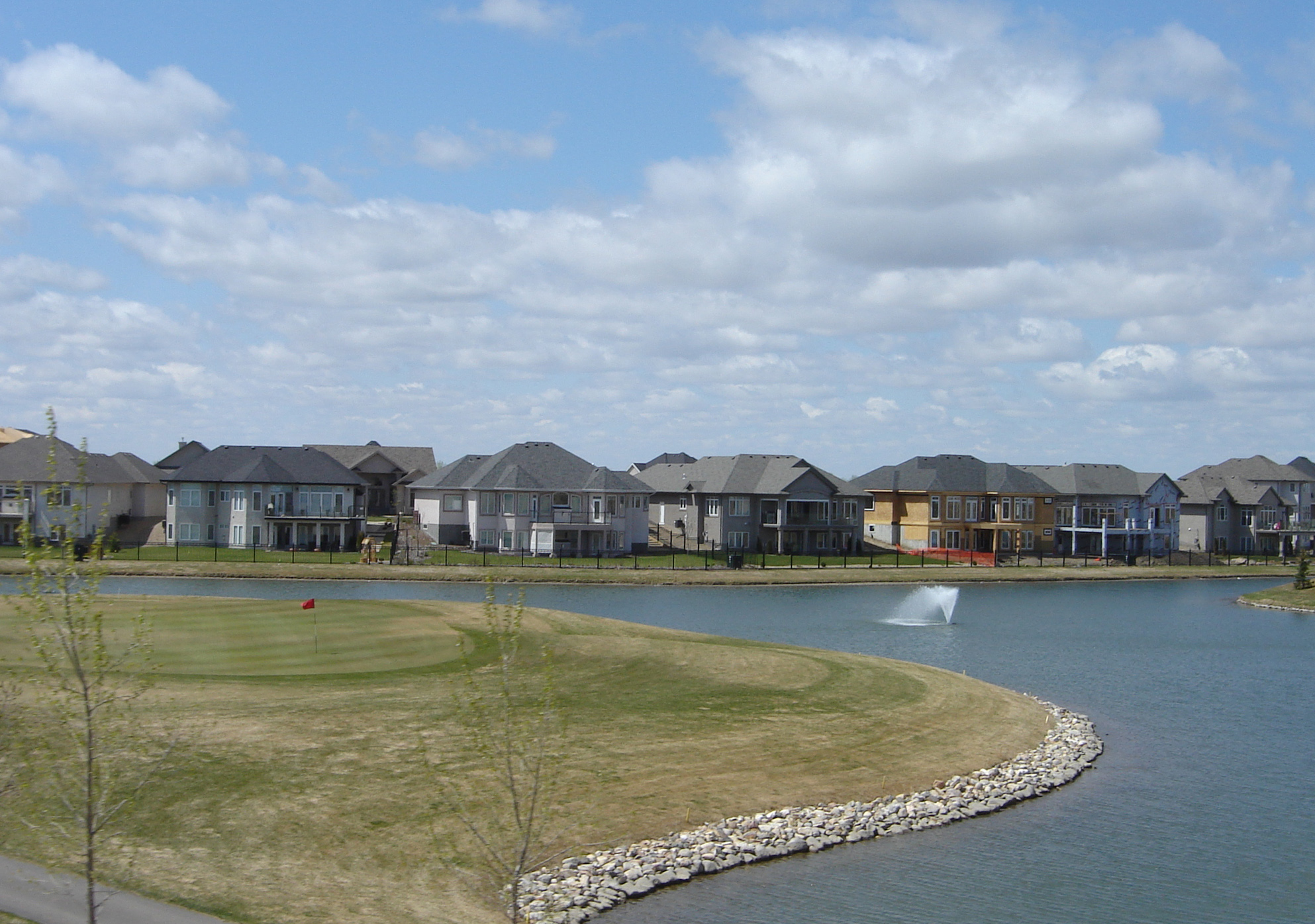
The Willows

The golf course itself is the major recreation facility in The Willows, though it is also close to the Saskatoon Golf and Country Club to the northwest.

Adjacent to The Willows' northwest boundary is a small triangle of land that was annexed by the city in September 2015. The Schroh Arena is located on this land located off Lorne Avenue south of Cartwright Street. A convention and banquet facility, the German Canadian Club Concordia, was located next door to the arena at the corner of Cartwright and Lorne until it was destroyed in a fire in 2009; it has since been rebuilt. The Saskatoon Exhibition Grounds, Western Development Museum, Marquis Downs race track and Diefenbaker Park are to the northwest via Lorne Avenue.

The Willows is also the closest Saskatoon community to the Dakota Dunes Casino a few miles south of Saskatoon on Lorne Avenue.

== Schools ==
The community's layout does not allow for the construction of schools. As of 2010 the nearest schools are located in Avalon and Adelaide/Churchill, some distance to the north, although schools are expected to eventually be constructed in Stonebridge just to the northeast of The Willows.

== Location ==
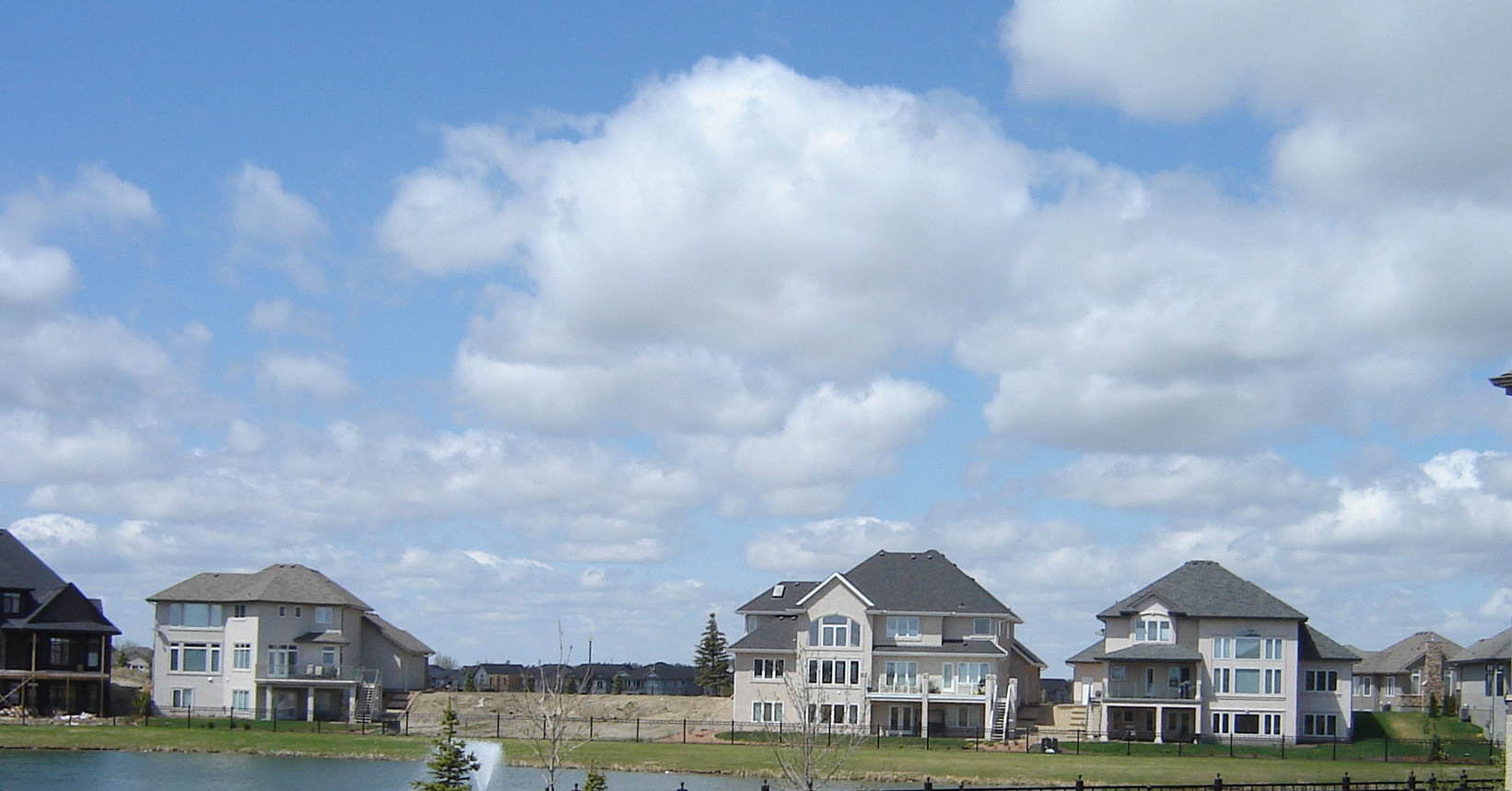
The Willows Residential Community and Golf Club

Coordinates: 52°4'39"N 106°39'30"W
