= Willow Springs Water Park =

Water park in Landmark, Arkansas, United States

Willow Springs
- Interactive map of Willow Springs
- Location: Little Rock, Arkansas, United States
- Coordinates: 34.628370°N 92.319778°W
- Opened: 1928; 98 years ago
- Closed: 2013; 13 years ago
- Operating season: May through September
- Water slides: 5 water slides

Willow Springs was a water park located in Little Rock, Arkansas. It closed for swimming in July 2013.

The park subsequently re-opened for fishing but not swimming. It closed permanently in August 2015.

== History & description ==
It was built in 1928. Willow Springs is a sandy bottom spring and well fed lake, similar to Maywood Beach in Mississippi. Unlike most water parks, visitors could bring their own food and drinks (no glass containers) into the park, though a restaurant called Upper Deck Café was located on site starting in 2006.

The original park had a swimming pool and skating rink. In 1960, new owners added the first ride called Toboggan Ride. The first water slide was added in 1982 measuring 400 feet. The old skating rink was then converted to a picnic area.

Local celebrities, such as Governor Faubus' wife and Governor (and later President) Bill Clinton were known to frequent the park.

== Season ==
Willow Springs was open from May through September each year.

== Amoebic meningitis outbreak and closure of the park ==
On July 26, 2013, the owner of the park shut it down indefinitely after a swimmer was diagnosed with amoebic meningitis, 3 years after another swimmer at the park died from the same infection. The Arkansas Department of Health determined that the park may have been at higher risk because the water is shallow and heats up faster (as the causative parasite is somewhat thermophillic). The owner had hoped to re-open the park if it would have been financially feasible to cover the bottom with concrete, since the protist that causes the disease tends to live in the soil at the bottom of lakes.

== Attractions ==
- Family Atmosphere
- 400 ft Waterslide
- Large Kiddie Pool and Playground Area
- Lifeguards on Duty
- Two Log Roll and Water Trampolines
- Lifejackets Available
- Covered Picnic Tables and Grills
- Group pricing available
- Water basketball, Volleyball, and Tetherball
- Swimming Lessons Available
- Horseshoe Pits
- Basketball and Soccer areas
