= Morris Creek =

Morris Creek may refer to:

- Morris Creek (South Dakota)
- Morris Creek Wildlife Management Area, a protected area in West Virginia
