= List of West Virginia wildlife management areas =

This is a list of wildlife management areas in West Virginia.

== West Virginia wildlife management areas ==
West Virginia Wildlife Management Areas
| | Wildlife Management Area | County | Area | | Accommodations | | Lakes | Shooting Ranges |
| | Wildlife Management Area | County | Acres | Hectares | Cabins | Camping | Lakes | Shooting Ranges |
|---|---|---|---|---|---|---|---|---|
| | Allegheny | Mineral | 5,884 | 2,381 | | | | |
| Thumbnail image of Hometown Park in Amherst-Plymouth WMA | Amherst-Plymouth | Putnam | 7,061 | 2,857 | | | | |
| Thumbnail image of Anawalt Lake in Anawalt Lake WMA | Anawalt Lake | McDowell | 2,097 | 849 | | | Check mark | |
| Thumbnail image of Bear Lake in Bear Rock Lakes WMA | Bear Rock Lakes | Ohio | 242 | 98 | | | Check mark | |
| | Becky Creek | Randolph | 1,930 | 781 | | | | |
| Thumbnail image of Beech Fork Lake and picnic area at Beech Fork Lake WMA | Beech Fork Lake | Cabell; Wayne | 7,531 | 3,048 | | | Check mark | Check mark |
| Thumbnail image of Berwind Lake | Berwind Lake | McDowell | 93 | 38 | | 8 | Check mark | |
| | Beury Mountain | Fayette | 9,232 | 3,736 | | | | |
| Thumbnail image of Big Ditch Lake | Big Ditch | Webster | 388 | 157 | | | Check mark | |
| | Big Ugly | Lincoln | 5,300 | 2,145 | | | | Check mark |
| Thumbnail image of Bluestone Lake WMA entrance sign | Bluestone Lake | Summers; Mercer; Monroe | 18,019 | 7,292 | | 330 | Check mark | Check mark |
| Thumbnail image of sign for Burches Run WMA | Burches Run | Marshall | 55 | 22 | | | | |
| Thumbnail image of Falls Mill at Burnsville Lake | Burnsville Lake | Braxton | 12,579 | 5,091 | | | Check mark | |
| Thumbnail image of Castleman Run Lake in Castleman Run Lake WMA | Castleman Run Lake | Brooke; Ohio | 486 | 197 | | | Check mark | |
| Thumbnail image of sign for Cecil H. Underwood WMA | Cecil H. Underwood | Marshall | 2,115 | 856 | | | | |
| Thumbnail image of Lewis Wetzel WMA entrance sign | Center Branch | Harrison | 974 | 394 | | | | |
| | Cheat Canyon | Preston | 3,836 | 1,552 | | | | |
| | Chief Cornstalk | Mason | 11,772 | 4,764 | | Check mark | | Check mark |
| | Conaway Run Lake | Tyler | 630 | 255 | | Check mark | | Check mark |
| | Cross Creek | Brooke | 2,080 | 842 | | | Check mark | |
| | Dents Run | Marion | 1,226 | 496 | | | Check mark | |
| Thumbnail image of Dunkard Fork Lake | Dunkard Fork | Marshall | 470 | 190 | | | Check mark | |
| Thumbnail image of view from East Lynn Lake dam | East Lynn Lake | Wayne | 22,928 | 9,279 | | | Check mark | |
| Thumbnail image of Edwards Run at Edwards Run Wildlife Management Area | Edwards Run | Hampshire | 397 | 153 | | | Check mark | |
| | Elk Creek | Logan; Mingo | 6,004 | 2,430 | | | | |
| | Elk River | Braxton | 18,225 | 7,375 | | | | Check mark |
| | Fairfax Pond-Rehe | Preston | 638 | 258 | | | | |
| Thumbnail image of Civil War trenches in Fort Mill Ridge WMA | Fort Mill Ridge | Hampshire | 217 | 88 | | | | |
| | Frozen Camp | Jackson | 2,735 | 1,107 | | Check mark | | Check mark |
| Thumbnail image of sign for Green Bottom WMA | Green Bottom | Cabell; Mason | 1,096 | 444 | | | | |
| | Handley | Pocahontas | 784 | 317 | | | | |
| | Hilbert | Lincoln | 289 | 117 | | | | |
| | Hillcrest | Hancock | 2,212 | 895 | | | | Check mark |
| | Horse Creek | Wyoming | 48 | 19 | | | | |
| | Hughes River | Ritchie; Wirt | 10,000 | 4,047 | | | | |
| Thumbnail image of Huttonsville State Farm WMA entrance sign | Huttonsville State Farm | Randolph | 2,720 | 1,101 | | | | |
| Thumbnail image of Lantz Farm and Nature Preserve WMA | Lantz Farm and Nature Preserve | Wetzel | 548 | 222 | | | | |
| Thumbnail image of Laurel Lake in Laurel Lake WMA | Laurel Lake | Mingo | 12,854 | 5,202 | | | Check mark | |
| Thumbnail image of Lewis Wetzel WMA entrance sign | Lewis Wetzel | Wetzel | 13,590 | 5,500 | | | | Check mark |
| Thumbnail image of wooded area in Little Indian Creek WMA | Little Indian Creek | Monongalia | 1,036 | 419 | | | | |
| | McClintic | Mason | 3,655 | 1,479 | | Check mark | | Check mark |
| | Meadow River | Greenbrier | 2,504 | 1,013 | | | | |
| | Mill Creek | Cabell | 1,470 | 595 | | | | |
| Thumbnail image of Moncove Lake | Moncove Lake | Monroe | 898 | 363 | | | Check mark | |
| | Morris Creek | Clay; Kanawha | 9,874 | 3,996 | | | | |
| | Nathaniel Mountain | Hampshire | 10,675 | 4,320 | | | | |
| Thumbnail image of Panther Creek in Panther Wildlife Management Areas | Panther | McDowell | 7,820 | 3,147 | | 8 | | Check mark |
| Thumbnail image of Mason Lake at Pedlar WMA | Pedlar | Monongalia | 766 | 310 | | | Check mark | Check mark |
| Thumbnail image of Tygart Lake in winter | Pleasant Creek | Barbour; Taylor | 3,030 | 1,226 | | | Check mark | Check mark |
| | Plum Orchard Lake | Fayette | 3,201 | 1,295 | | 38 | Check mark | Check mark |
| | Pruntytown State Farm | Taylor | 1,764 | 714 | | | | |
| Thumbnail image of intake tower at R.D. Bailey Lake | R.D. Bailey Lake | Mingo; Wyoming | 17,280 | 6,993 | | | Check mark | Check mark |
| | Ritchie Mines | Ritchie | 2,300 | 931 | | | | |
| | Sand Hill | Ritchie; Wood | 967 | 391 | | | | |
| | Shannondale Springs | Jefferson | 1,566 | 634 | | | | |
| | Short Mountain | Hampshire | 8,005 | 3,240 | | | | |
| | Slatyfork | Pocahontas; Randolph | 49 | 20 | | | | |
| | Sleepy Creek | Berkeley; Morgan | 22,928 | 9,279 | | | | Check mark |
| | Smoke Camp | Lewis | 252 | 102 | | | | |
| Thumbnail image of Cheat Canyon in Snake Hill WMA | Snake Hill | Monongalia | 3,092 | 1,251 | | | | |
| | South Branch | Hampshire; Hardy | 1,097 | 444 | | | | |
| Thumbnail image of Stonecoal Lake | Stonecoal Lake | Lewis; Upshur | 3,000 | 1,214 | | | Check mark | |
| Thumbnail image of Stonewall Jackson Lake | Stonewall Jackson Lake | Lewis | 18,289 | 7,401 | | | Check mark | Check mark |
| | Stumptown | Calhoun; Gilmer | 1,674 | 677 | | | | |
| Thumbnail image of Summersville Lake | Summersville Lake | Nicholas | 5,974 | 2,418 | | | Check mark | |
| | Tate Lohr | Mercer | 576 | 233 | | | | |
| Thumbnail image of Teter Creek Lake WMA | Teter Creek Lake | Barbour | 136 | 55 | | | | |
| | The Jug | Tyler | 2,065 | 836 | | | | |
| | Thorn Creek | Pendleton | 528 | 214 | | | | |
| | Tug Fork | McDowell | 2,165 | 876 | | | | |
| | Turkey Run | Jackson | 64 | 26 | | | Check mark | |
| Thumbnail image of Upper Deckers Creek WMA | Upper Deckers Creek | Preston | 56 | 23 | | | | |
| | Upper Mud River | Lincoln | 1,725 | 698 | | | | |
| | Valley Bend Wetlands | Randolph | 31 | 13 | | | | |
| Thumbnail image of Lewis Wetzel WMA entrance sign | Wallback | Clay; Kanawha; Roane | 11,757 | 4,758 | | | | Check mark |
| | Widmeyer | Morgan | 422 | 171 | | | | |
| | Woodrum Lake | Jackson | 1,700 | 688 | | | Check mark | |
Former West Virginia Wildlife Management Areas
| | Briery Mountain Wildlife Management Area – Closed in 2011. | | | | | | | |
| | Fork Creek Wildlife Management Area – Closed in 2008. | | | | | | | |
| | Springfield Wildlife Management Area – Closed in 2004. | | | | | | | |

== See also ==
- List of West Virginia state parks
- List of West Virginia state forests
