= Turkey Run =

Turkey Run may refer to:

- Claude Moore Colonial Farm, a U.S. park recreating a 1771 era tenant farm
- Turkey Run (Shellpot Creek tributary), a stream in New Castle County, Delaware
- Turkey Run (West Branch Susquehanna River), in Lycoming County, Pennsylvania

== Protected areas ==
- Turkey Run State Park in Indiana
- Turkey Run Wildlife Management Area in West Virginia
