= Becky Creek Wildlife Management Area =

State Wildlife Management Area in Randolph County, West Virginia

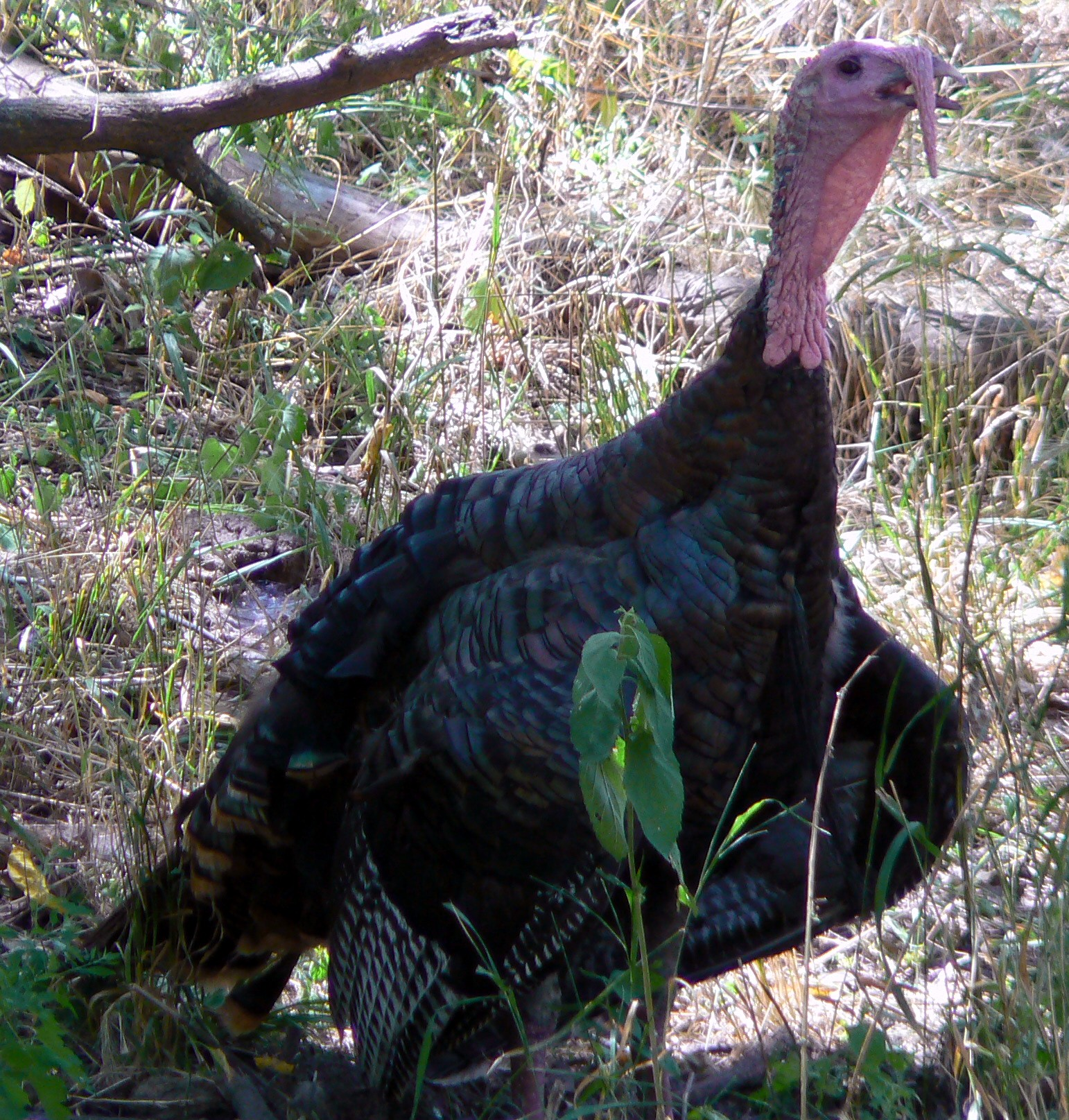
- Wild turkey, Meleagris gallopavo, is found in the Becky Creek WMA

- Location within West Virginia
- Location: Randolph, West Virginia, United States
- Coordinates: 38°37′24″N 79°57′56″W
- Area: 1,930 acres (7.8 km^{2})
- Elevation: 2,450 ft (750 m)
- Operator: West Virginia Division of Natural Resources, Wildlife Resources Section
- Website: WVDNR District 3 Wildlife Management Areas

Becky Creek Wildlife Management Area is located on 1,930 acres (780 ha) south of Huttonsville in Randolph County, West Virginia. The terrain at Becky Creek is steep, and is covered with second-growth hardwood forest. Camping is permitted in the designated area. Camping is also available at nearby Kumbrabow State Forest.

Becky Creek derives its name from a local pioneer whose name is variously cited as either Becky or Beckay.

== Hunting and Trapping ==
Hunting opportunities include bear, deer, and turkey. Opportunities to trap for fur can include bobcat, fox and raccoon.

== See also ==
- Animal conservation
- Bear bag
- Kumbrabow State Forest
- List of West Virginia wildlife management areas
