= Upper Deckers Creek Wildlife Management Area =

State Wildlife Management Area in Preston County, West Virginia

- IUCN category V (protected landscape/seascape)
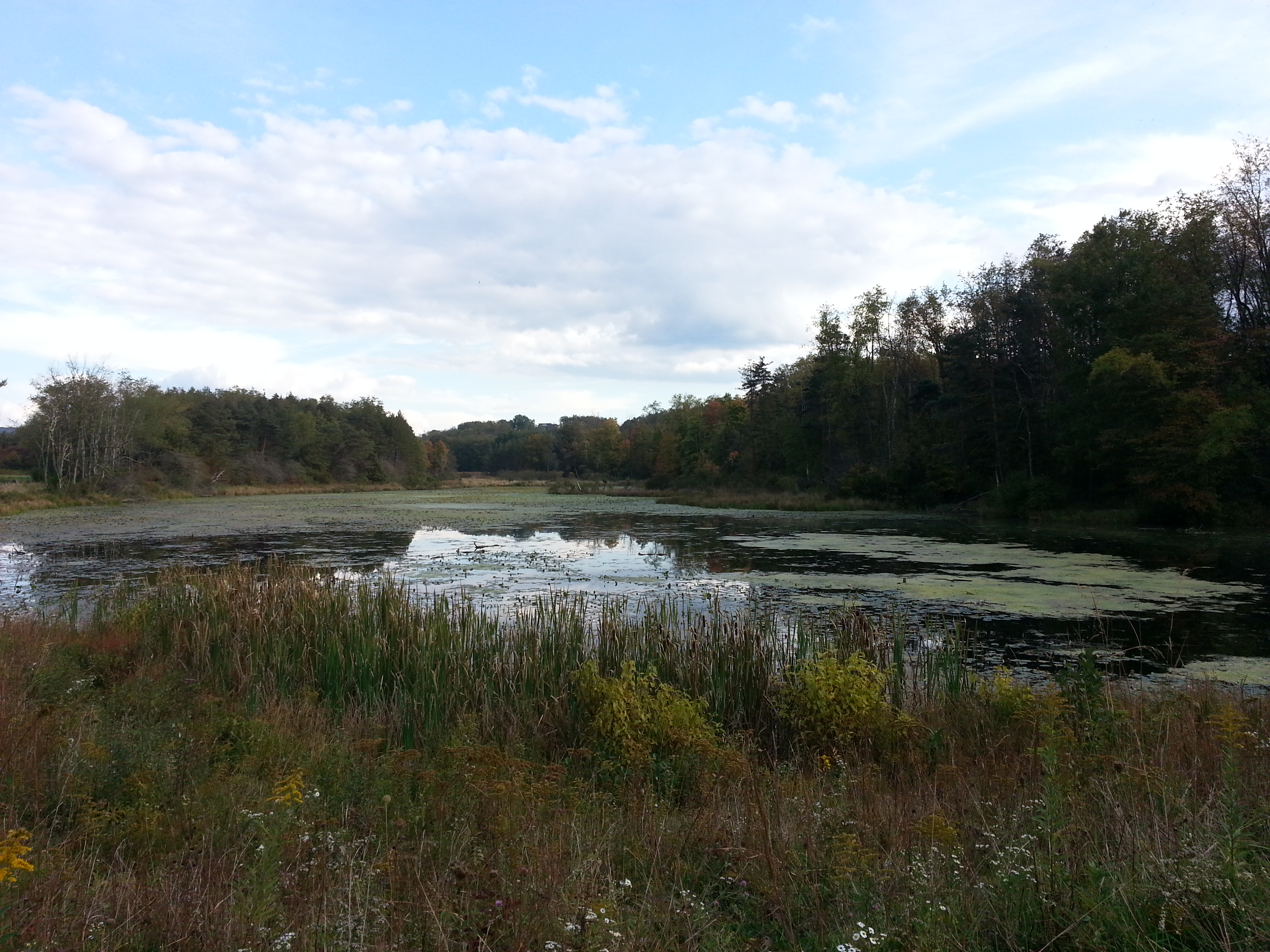
- Upper Deckers Creek WMA in September 2013

- Location within West Virginia
- Location: Preston, West Virginia, United States
- Coordinates: 39°31′38″N 79°47′12″W
- Area: 56 acres (23 ha)
- Elevation: 1,710 ft (520 m)
- Operator: Wildlife Resources Section, WV Division of Natural Resources

Upper Deckers Creek Wildlife Management Area, is located about 1 mile (1.6 km) north of Reedsville, West Virginia in Preston County. Upper Deckers Creek WMA is located on 56 acres (23 ha), consisting of two small fishing ponds and surrounding forested rolling hills.

The WMA is accessed from County Route 27/3 about one mile north of Reedsville.

== Hunting and fishing ==
Hunting opportunities are limited by the small size of the WMA and the nearby housing. Waterfowl can be taken from the impoundments.

Upper Deckers Creek WMA provides fishing opportunities for bluegill.

Camping is not permitted at the WMA.

== See also ==
- Animal conservation
- fishing
- List of West Virginia wildlife management areas
