= Cheat Canyon Wildlife Management Area =

State Wildlife Management Area in Preston County, West Virginia

- Location within West Virginia
- Location: Preston, West Virginia, United States
- Coordinates: 39°35′48″N 79°44′55″W
- Area: 3,836 acres (15.52 km^{2})
- Elevation: 616 ft (188 m)
- Established: 2014
- Website: WVDNR District 1 Wildlife Management Areas

Cheat Canyon Wildlife Management Area is located on 3,836 acres (1,552 ha) northwest of Albright in Preston County, West Virginia. The wildlife management area is centered on the Cheat River canyon.

Cheat Canyon WMA was purchased at a cost of over $7 million in 2014. Governor Earl Ray Tomblin dedicated the area on September 12, 2014.

== See also ==
- Animal conservation
- Fishing
- Hunting
- List of West Virginia wildlife management areas
