= Plum Orchard Lake Wildlife Management Area =

State Wildlife Management Area in Fayette County, West Virginia

- IUCN category IV (habitat/species management area)
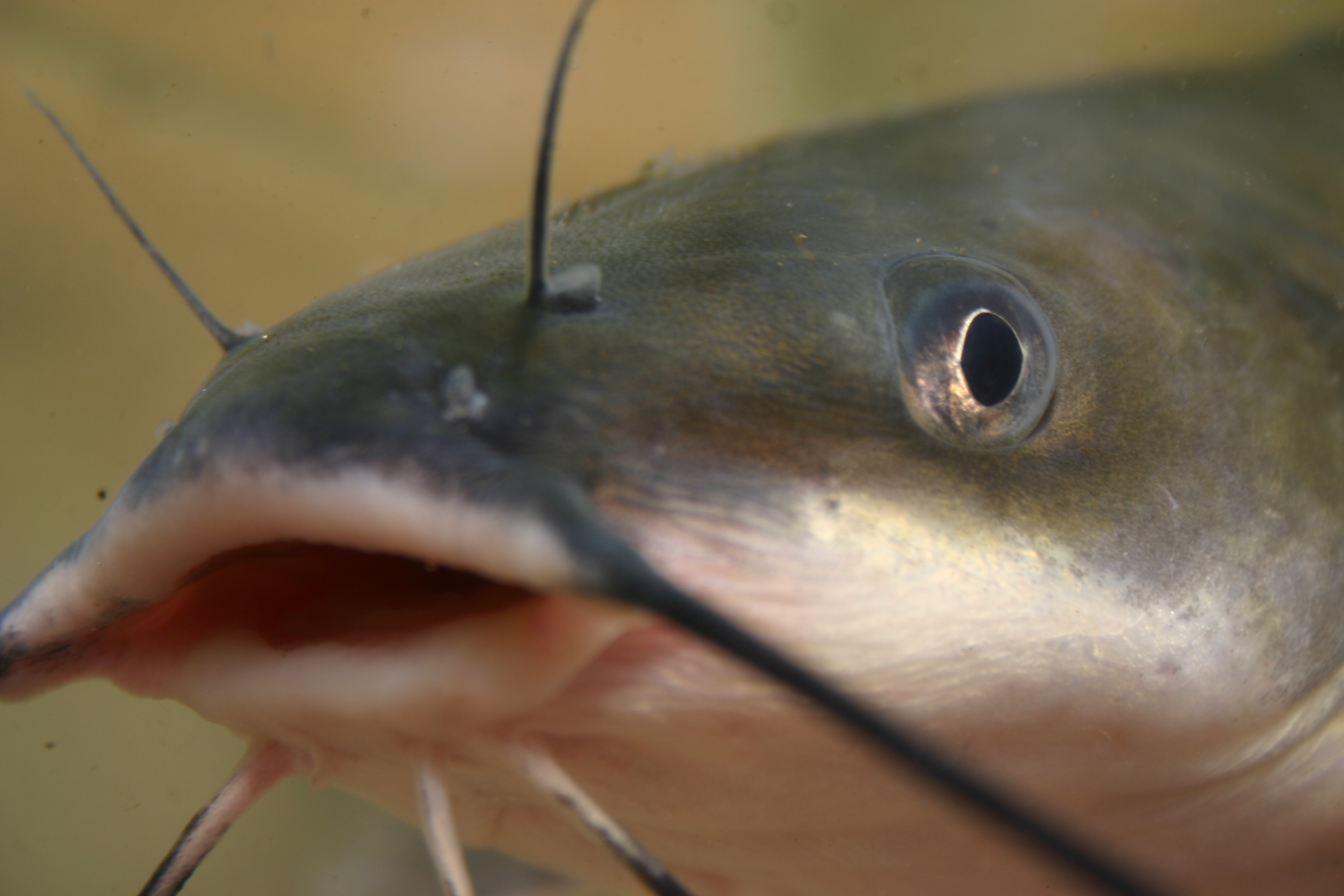
- Channel catfish (Ictalurus punctatus) may be found at the Plum Orchard Lake WMA

- Location within West Virginia
- Location: Fayette, West Virginia, United States
- Coordinates: 37°57′05″N 81°13′47″W
- Area: 3,030 acres (12.3 km^{2})
- Elevation: 1,743 ft (531 m)
- Established: 1960

Plum Orchard Lake Wildlife Management Area, is located near Pax, West Virginia in Fayette county. Located on 3,201 acres (1,295 ha) land that varies from wetlands to steeply forested woodlands, the Pleasant Creek WMA rises to an elevation of 1,600 feet (490 m).

Access to Plum Orchard Lake WMA is from the Mossy or Pax exits of I-77, then following County Route 23 (Paint Creek Road) to County Route 23/1 (Plum Orchard Lake Road.)

== Hunting and Fishing ==
Hunting opportunities in Plum Orchard Lake WMA include deer, raccoon, squirrel, turkey and waterfowl.

Fishing opportunities in 202-acre (82 ha) Plum Orchard Lake include largemouth bass, channel catfish, crappie, bluegill, sunfish, crappie.

Four boat ramps are available at Plum Orchard Lake. Forty-two (42) rustic camping sites for tents or trailers are available in the WMA.

== See also ==
- Animal conservation
- Fishing
- Hunting
- List of West Virginia wildlife management areas
