= Hughes River Wildlife Management Area =

State Wildlife Management Area in Ritchie and Wirt counties, West Virginia

- IUCN category V (protected landscape/seascape)
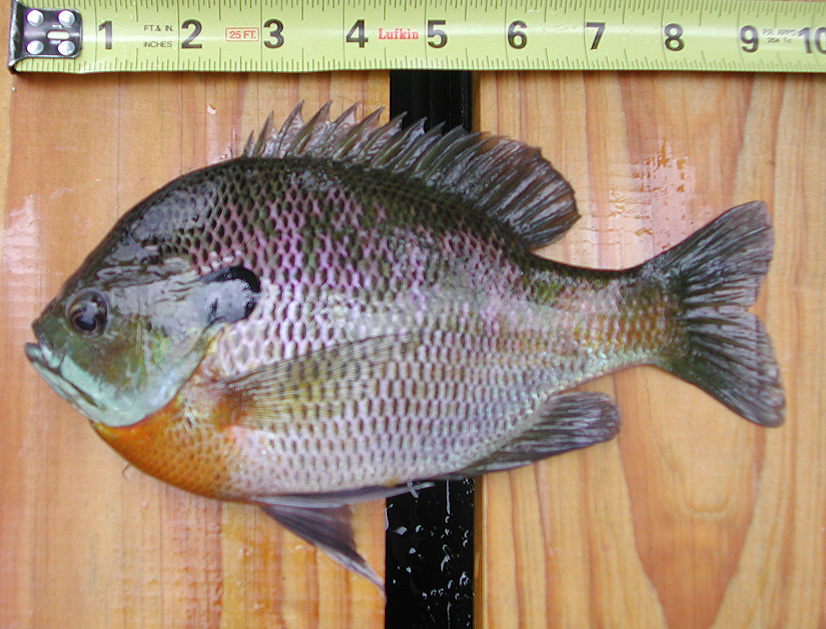
- Panfish, such as this bluegill (OLepomis macrochirus) may be found in the Hughes River WMA

- Location within West Virginia
- Location: West Virginia, United States
- Coordinates: 39°08′30″N 81°23′32″W
- Area: 10,000 acres (40 km^{2})
- Elevation: 625 ft (191 m)
- Operator: Wildlife Resources Section, WV Division of Natural Resources

Hughes River Wildlife Management Area is located in Wirt County and Ritchie County near Parkersburg, West Virginia. Located on 10,000 acres (4,000 ha) that border both the Little Kanawha River and the Hughes River. The WMA terrain varies from river bottom to steep hillsides covered with second growth oak-hickory hardwood stands and younger pine-hardwood woodlots.

To reach the Hughes River WMA from Parkersburg follow West Virginia Route 47 east about 15 miles (24 km) to the Wirt County and Ritchie County line. The Hughes River WMA is located on both sides of the road at the Wirt/Ritchie county line.

== Hunting and Fishing ==
Hunting opportunities include deer, grouse, squirrel, and turkey.

Fishing opportunities abound in both the Little Kanawha and Hughes Rivers, and can include smallmouth bass, channel catfish, muskellunge, and panfish (including bluegill.)

Camping is not permitted in the WMA. Camping is available at nearby North Bend State Park.

== See also ==
- Animal conservation
- Fishing
- Hunting
- List of West Virginia wildlife management areas
