= Fork Creek Wildlife Management Area =

Former protected area in West Virginia, US

- Location within West Virginia
- Location: Boone, West Virginia, United States
- Coordinates: 38°09′14″N 81°45′02″W
- Area: 7,000 acres (28 km^{2})
- Elevation: 910 ft (280 m)
- Established: 2008-07-31
- Operator: Wildlife Resources Section, WVDNR

The former Fork Creek Wildlife Management Area was located on 7,000 acres (2,800 ha) in Boone County near Nellis, West Virginia. The steep terrain and narrow valleys are mostly covered with second-growth mixed hardwoods.

Originally established in 1960 with a lease from Armco Steel, the land was subsequently purchased by Island Creek Coal. The WMA closed on July 31, 2008, as a result of mining in the area that severed the access road into the area.

== Hunting and fishing ==
Fishing opportunities were limited by the small size of the stream. Available hunting included deer, fox, grouse, squirrel, turkey and raccoon.

== See also ==
- Animal conservation
- Fishing
- Hunting
- List of West Virginia wildlife management areas
