= Hilbert Wildlife Management Area =

State Wildlife Management Area in Lincoln County, West Virginia

- IUCN category V (protected landscape/seascape)
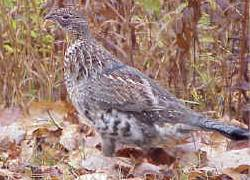
- The Ruffed Grouse (Bonasa umbellus) may be found in the Hilbert WMA

- Location within West Virginia
- Location: Lincoln, West Virginia, United States
- Coordinates: 38°15′00″N 81°54′56″W
- Area: 289 acres (117 ha)
- Elevation: 850 ft (260 m)
- Operator: Wildlife Resources Section, WV Division of Natural Resources

Hilbert Wildlife Management Area is located in Lincoln County near Sod, West Virginia, less than forty-five minutes drive south of Charleston, the state capital. Located on 289 acres (117 ha), the WMA land is steep and heavily covered with second growth hickory-oak hardwood forest.

From Charleston, follow U.S. Route 119/WV Route 214 to Alum Creek, then follow WV Route 214 west through Sod to Joes Creek Road. Follow Joes Creek Road north to the Hilbert WMA.

== Hunting ==
Hunting opportunities, though limited by the small size of Hilbert WMA, can include deer, fox, grouse, and squirrel.

Camping is not permitted in the WMA.

== See also ==
- Animal conservation
- Fishing
- Hunting
- List of West Virginia wildlife management areas
