= Beury Mountain Wildlife Management Area =

State Wildlife Management Area in Fayette County, West Virginia

Beury Mountain WMA
- IUCN category V (protected landscape/seascape)
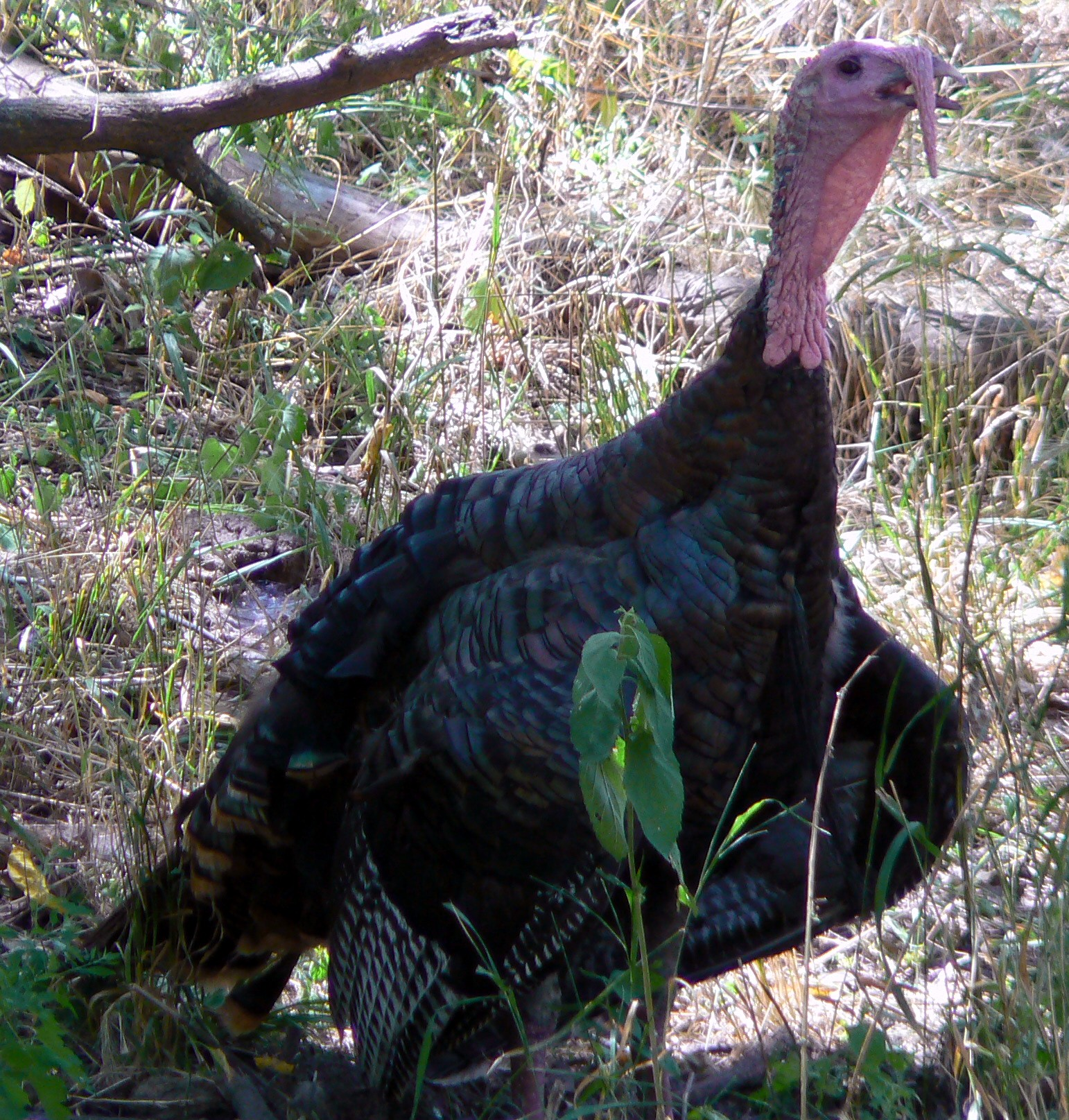
- Wild turkey, Meleagris gallopavo, is found in the Beury Mountain WMA

- Location within West Virginia
- Location: Fayette, West Virginia, United States
- Coordinates: 37°58′6″N 80°58′24″W
- Area: 9,232 acres (37.36 km^{2})
- Elevation: 2,850 ft (870 m)
- Operator: WVDNR, Wildlife Resources Section
- Website: WVDNR District 4 Wildlife Management Areas

Beury Mountain Wildlife Management Area is located on 9,232 acres (3,736 ha) near Babcock State Park and New River Gorge National River in Fayette County, West Virginia. Beury Mountain's sloping terrain is covered with mixed hardwoods and oak-hickory second growth woodlands overlooking New River Gorge. Camping is not allowed at Beury Mountain WMA, but is available at nearby Babcock State Park.

== Expansion ==
In January 2008, The Nature Conservancy and West Virginia Division of Natural Resources announced they had acquired 4,584 acres (1,855 ha) of land adjacent to New River Gorge from Mountain Top Management, Inc. The land, which borders the Gorge for 4.5 miles (7.2 km), was purchased by the Nature Conservancy for $1,000 an acre and leased to the Division of Natural Resources. The State has committed to purchase the land and reimburse the Conservancy over a period of three years. WVDNR has expressed interest in constructing a rifle range and improving habitat along upper Buffalo Creek in the tract.

In February 2010, The Nature Conservancy and WVDNR again announced plans for an expansion of Beury Mountain through a new land purchase. In this new agreement, 1,585 acres (641 ha) were purchased from Greenbrier Wood Products by The Nature Conservancy. The land borders New River Gorge National River for 6 miles (9.7 km) and sits between National Park Service property and the existing WMA land. WVDNR will take title control of the land as it reimburses The Nature Conservancy for the purchase price through 2012.

== Directions ==
Beury Mountain WMA is immediately south of Babcock State Park. To reach the area from U.S. Route 60, turn south on WV Route 41 at Lookout, and turn onto Sewell Road (County Road 19/33) and follow 3 miles (4.8 km) to the Beury Mountain WMA. Alternatively, take West Virginia Route 41 to Chestnut Knob Road at Layland, and then follow Beury Mountain Road to access the newer tract.

== Hunting ==
Hunting opportunities include deer, squirrel, and turkey.

== See also ==
- Animal conservation
- List of West Virginia wildlife management areas
