= Little Indian Creek Wildlife Management Area =

State Wildlife Management Area in Monongalia County, West Virginia

- IUCN category V (protected landscape/seascape)
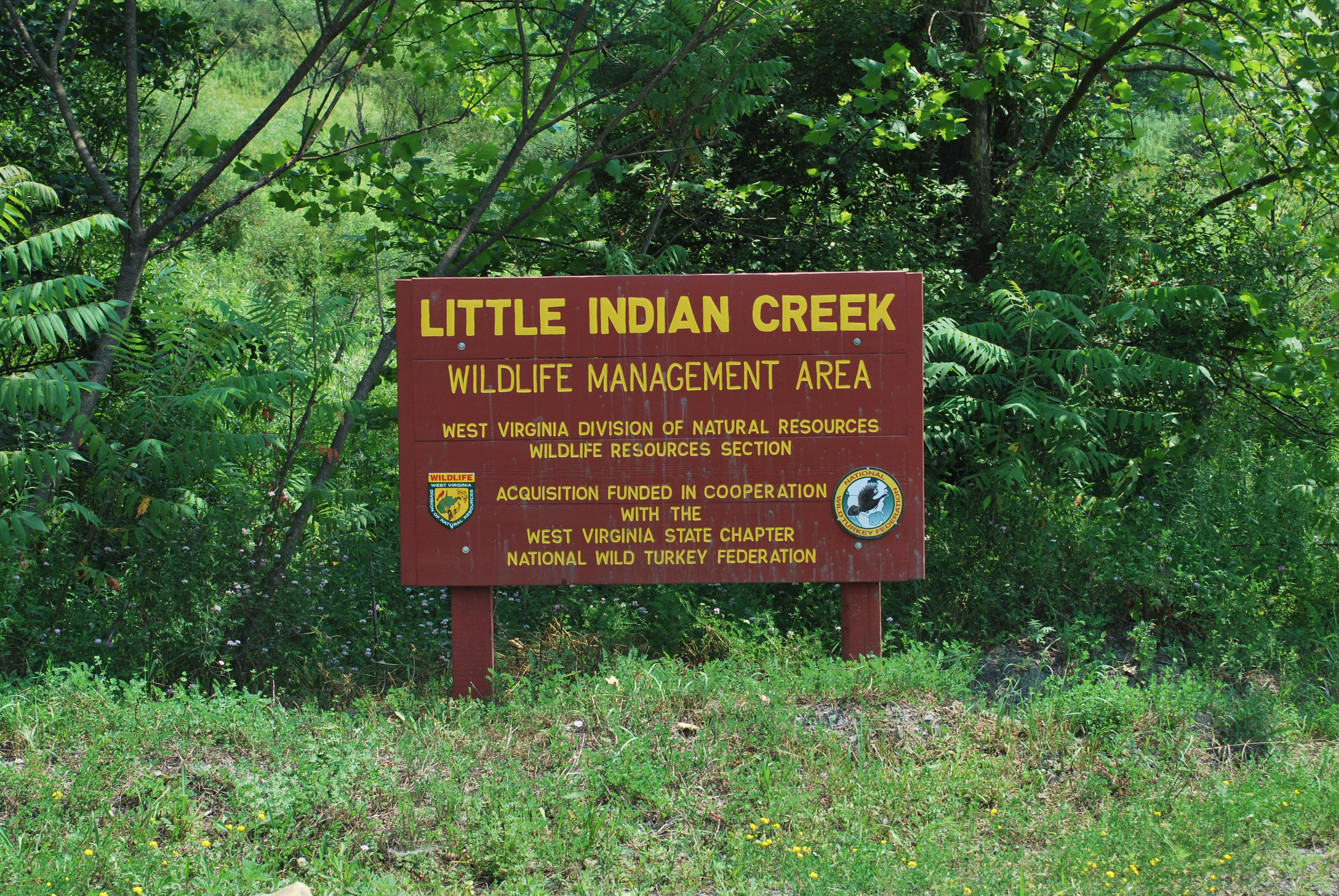
- Little Indian Creek WMA sign

- Location within West Virginia
- Location: Monongalia, West Virginia, United States
- Coordinates: 39°36′14″N 80°04′07″W
- Area: 1,036 acres (4.19 km^{2})
- Elevation: 1,000 ft (300 m)
- Established: 2006
- Website: WVDNR District 1 Wildlife Management Areas

Little Indian Creek Wildlife Management Area is located on 1,036 acres (419 ha) southwest of Westover in Monongalia County, West Virginia. The wildlife management area is centered on reclaimed former coal mine land along Little Indian Creek, a tributary of the Monongahela River.

Little Indian Creek WMA was purchased at a cost of $388,500 in late 2006. Governor Joe Manchin dedicated the area on 2005-06-27.

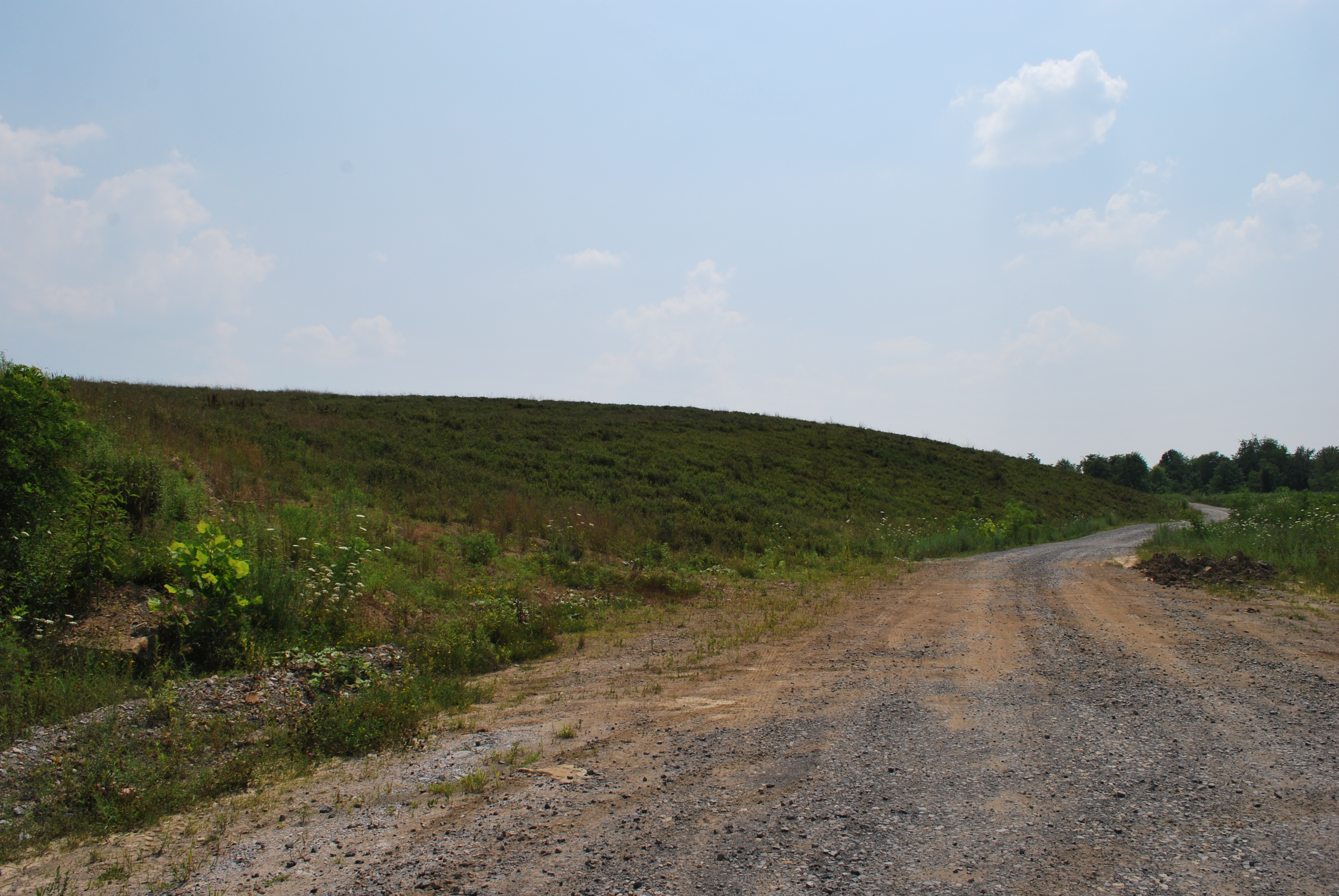
Reclaimed mine land

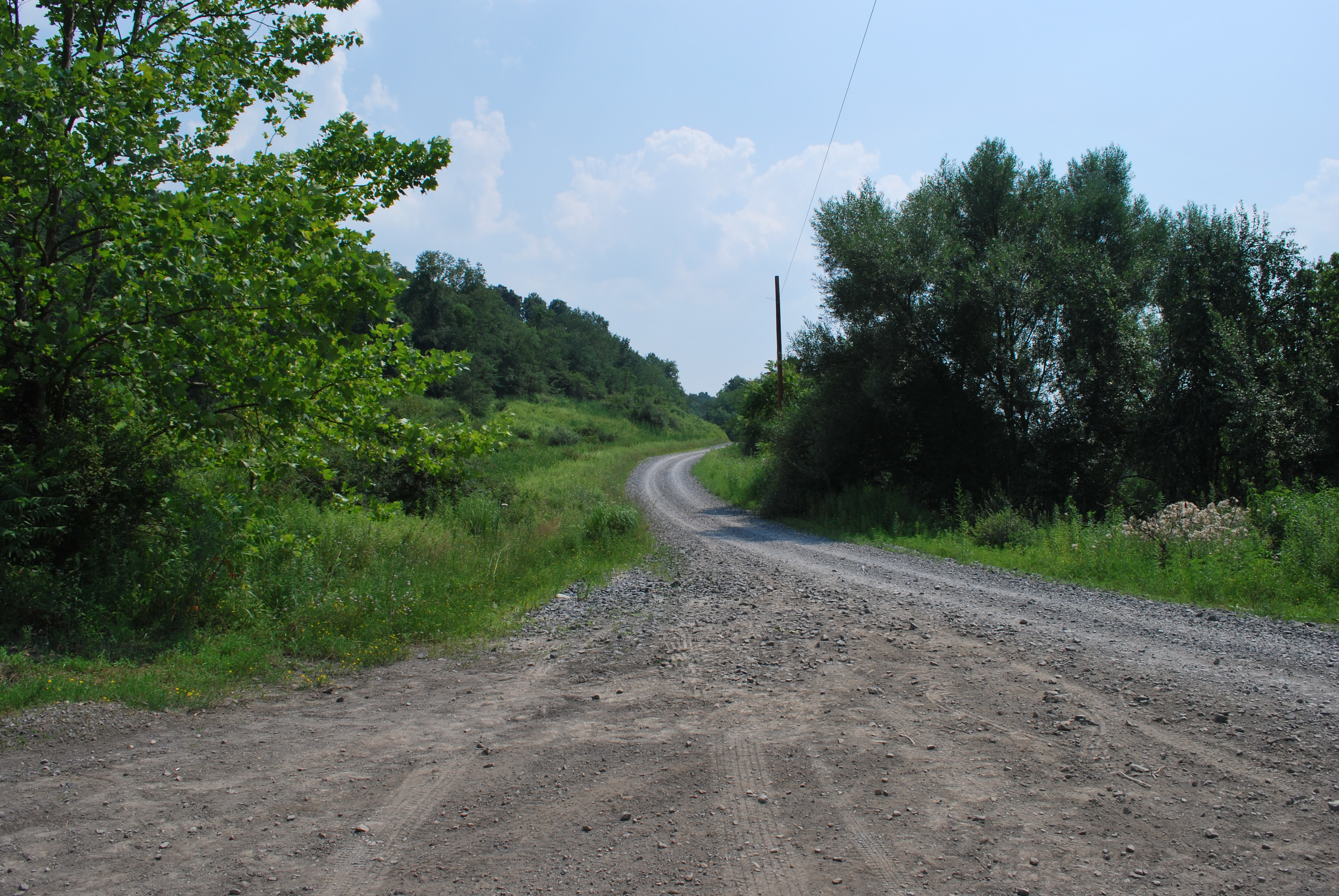
Wooded area

== See also ==
- Animal conservation
- Fishing
- Hunting
- List of West Virginia wildlife management areas
