= Cecil H. Underwood Wildlife Management Area =

State Wildlife Management Area in Marshall and Wetzel counties, West Virginia

- IUCN category V (protected landscape/seascape)
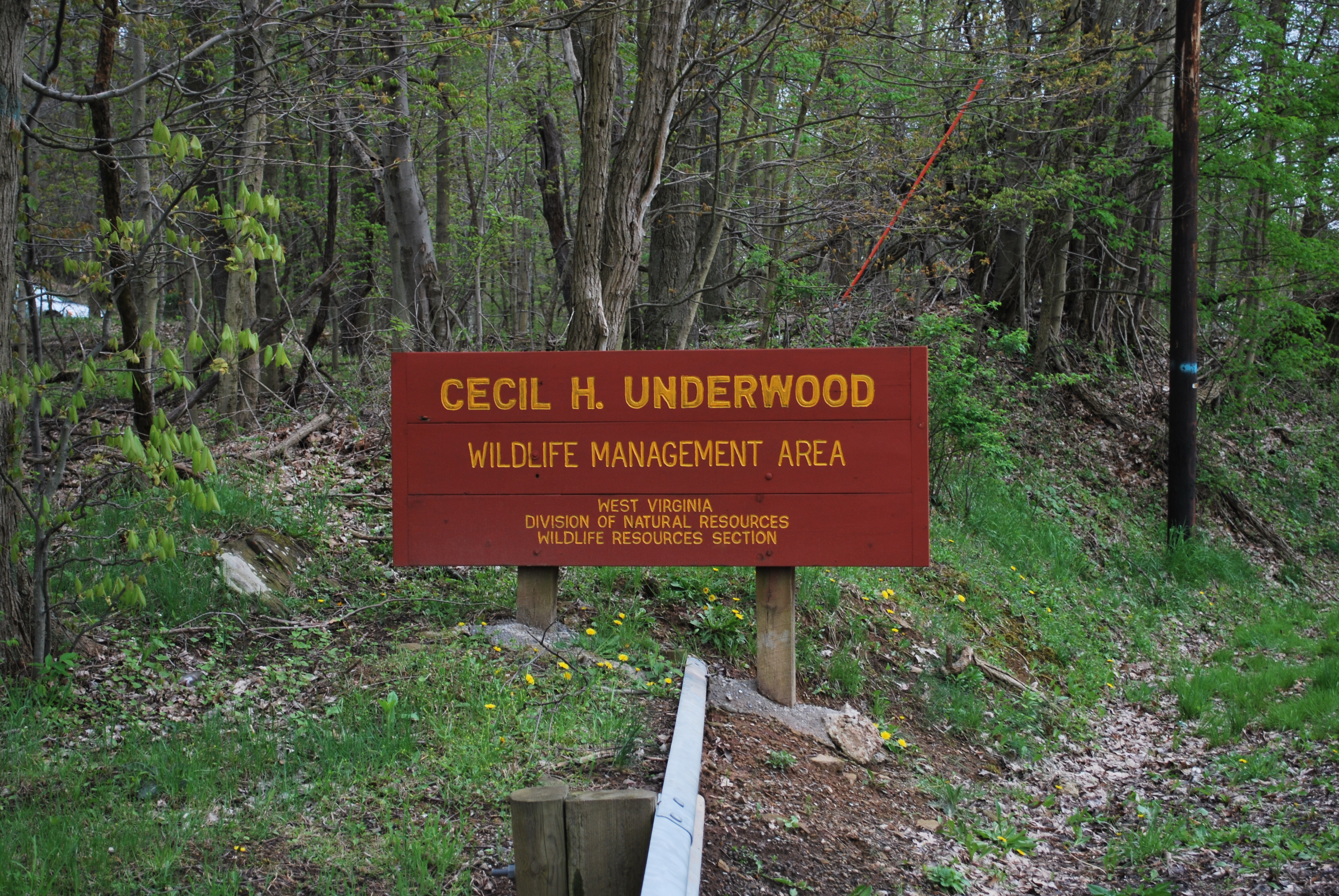
- Sign for Cecil H. Underwood WMA along US 250

- Location within West Virginia
- Location: West Virginia, United States
- Coordinates: 39°43′20″N 80°32′53″W
- Area: 2,215 acres (8.96 km^{2})
- Elevation: 1,440 ft (440 m)
- Operator: Wildlife Resources Section, WVDNR

Cecil H. Underwood Wildlife Management Area is located on 2,215 acres (896 ha) near in Marshall and Wetzel counties near Cameron, West Virginia. The rugged, steep terrain varies in elevation from about 800 feet along the banks of the West Virginia Fork of Fish Creek to over 1500 feet. The steep slopes are covered with mixed hardwoods and forest clearings fields. The WMA is located about 10 miles south of Cameron on Rice Ridge Road off U. S. Route 250, along the border of Marshall and Wetzel counties.

== Hunting and Fishing ==
Hunting opportunities, limited by the small size of the area, include deer, grouse, squirrel, turkey and grouse. Fishing opportunities in the West Virginia Fork of Fish Creek include smallmouth bass, rock bass, and sunfish. Camping is prohibited at this WMA.

== See also ==
- Animal conservation
- Hunting
- List of West Virginia wildlife management areas
- Recreational fishing
