= Dunkard Fork Wildlife Management Area =

State Wildlife Management Area in Marshall County, West Virginia

- IUCN category V (protected landscape/seascape)
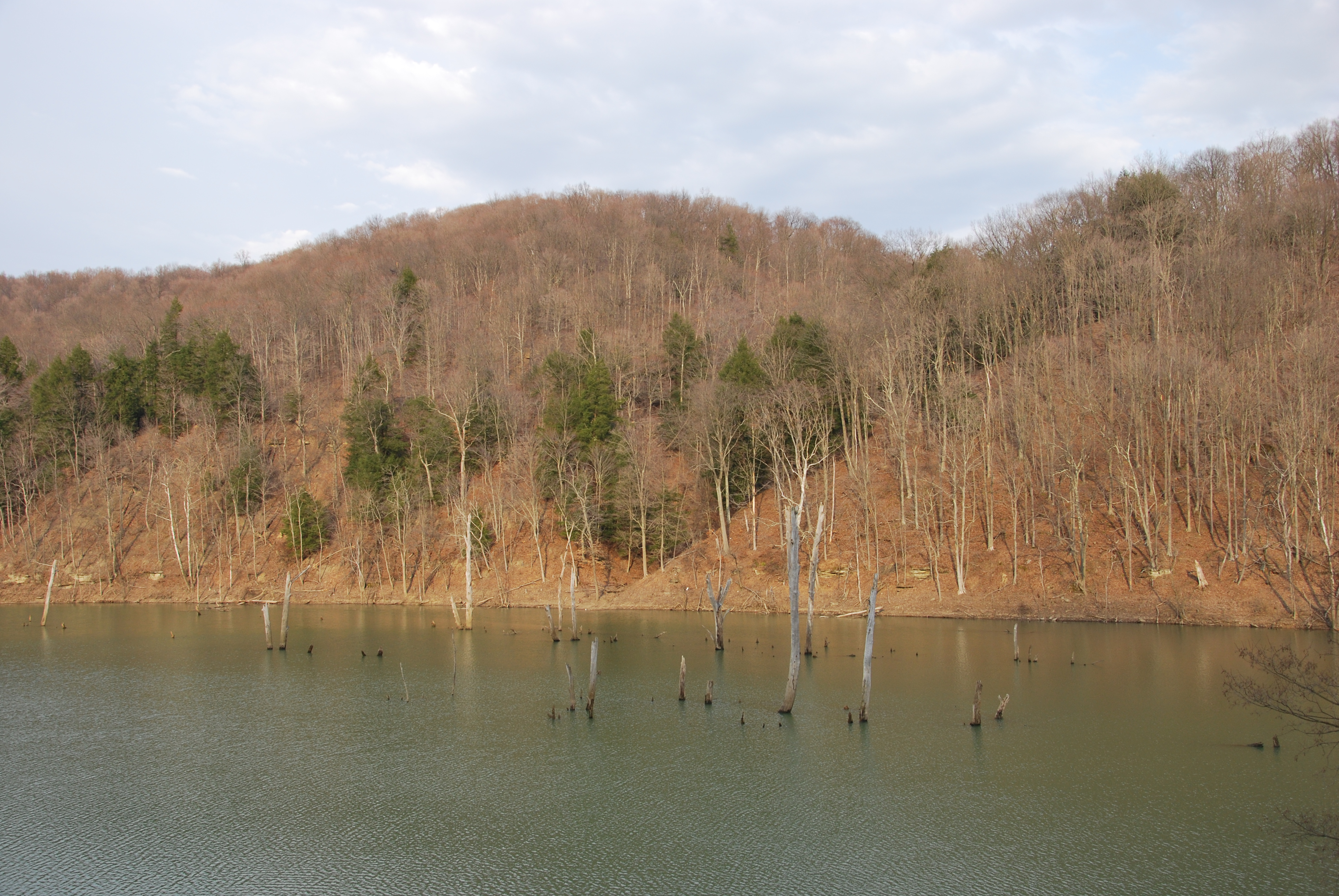
- Dunkard Fork Lake

- Location within West Virginia
- Location: Marshall, West Virginia, United States
- Coordinates: 39°57′08″N 80°31′27″W
- Area: 470 acres (190 ha)
- Elevation: 835 ft (255 m)
- Operator: West Virginia Division of Natural Resources

Dunkard Fork Wildlife Management Area is located on 470 acres (190 ha) in Marshall County near Moundsville, West Virginia. Mixed hardwoods cover most of the former Jacob Crow (1815–1901) (later C.C. Mooney [d. 1970] farm, site, whose major focus is a flood control lake on Dunkard Fork Wheeling Creek. The rolling terrain is punctuated with a few highwalls and ponds. Dunkard Fork WMA is located in northeast Marshall County along the Pennsylvania line on County Route 15. Construction of the dam was originally slated for a location upstream, but was later moved into West Virginia. Construction was underway by 1991 and the Jacob Crow farm was ruined. Archeological digs were conducted and photographs taken to document the site before the structures were razed.

== Hunting and Fishing ==
Hunting opportunities are limited by the small size of the area. Available hunting can include deer, grouse, squirrel, turkey and waterfowl while fishing opportunities in the 49-acre (20 ha) Dunkard Fork Lake include tiger musky, black bass, hybrid striped bass, bluegill and channel catfish, as well as stocked trout. A small portion of the lake headwaters extend into Pennsylvania.

Camping is prohibited on the Dunkard Fork WMA land. Only electric motors may be used on boats.

== See also ==
- Animal conservation
- Fishing
- Hunting
- List of West Virginia wildlife management areas
