= Mill Creek Wildlife Management Area =

State Wildlife Management Area in Cabell County, West Virginia

- IUCN category V (protected landscape/seascape)
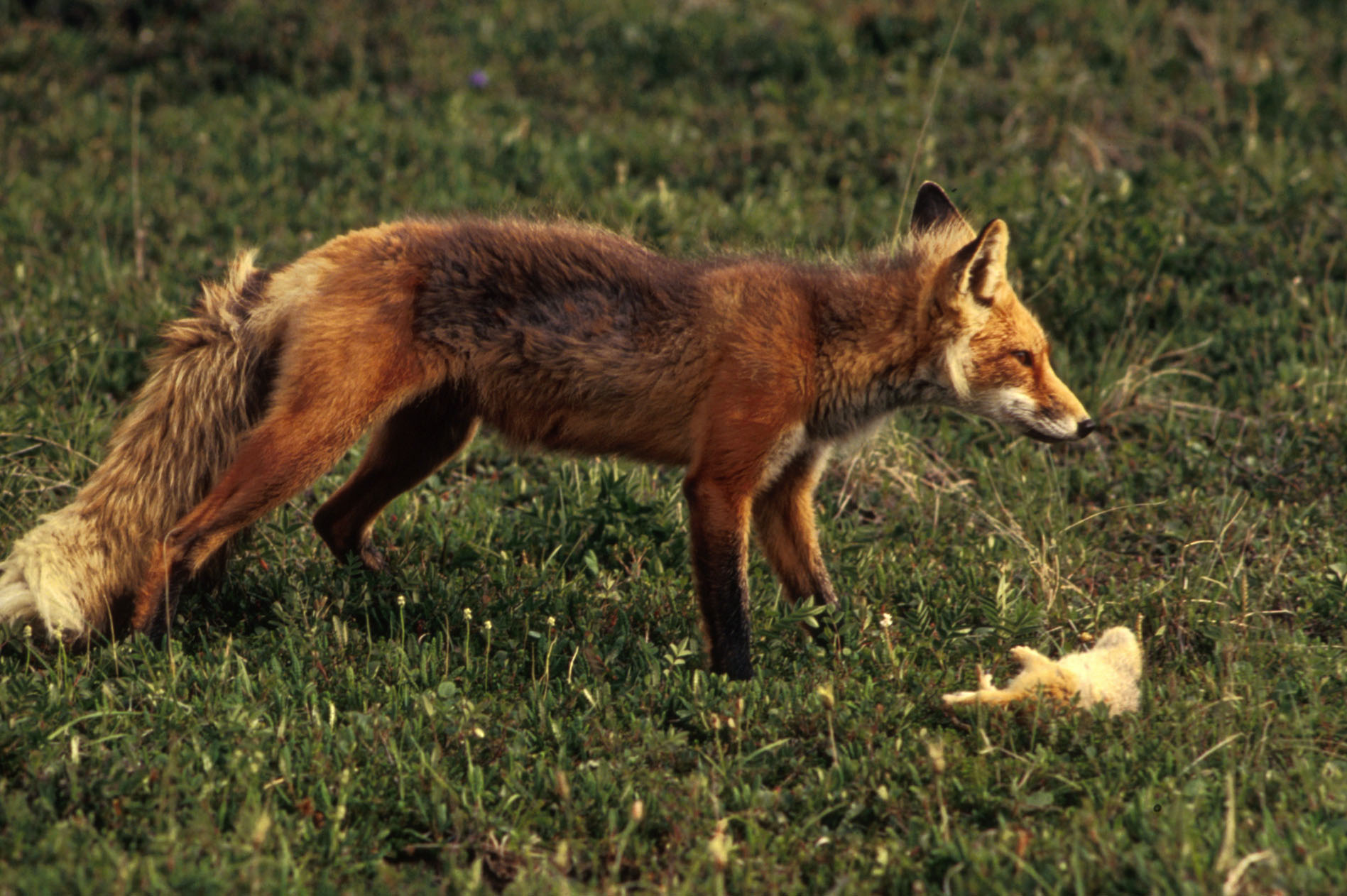
- Red fox (Vulpes vulpes) may be found in the Mill Creek WMA

- Location within West Virginia
- Location: Cabell, West Virginia, United States
- Coordinates: 38°27′50″N 82°06′57″W
- Area: 1,470 acres (5.9 km^{2})
- Elevation: 613 ft (187 m)
- Operator: Wildlife Resources Section, WV Division of Natural Resources

Mill Creek Wildlife Management Area is 1,470 acres (590 ha) of steeply forested woodlands located near Milton, West Virginia in Cabell County. Mill Creek WMA can be accessed from Johns Creek Road about three miles north from the Milton exit of I-64.

== Hunting and wildlife viewing ==
Hunting opportunities include deer, fox, grouse, rabbit, raccoon, squirrel.

Camping is not available in the WMA, but it is available at the nearby Fox Fire Resort.

== See also ==
- Animal conservation
- Hunting
- List of West Virginia wildlife management areas
