= Handley Wildlife Management Area =

State Wildlife Management Area in Pocahontas County, West Virginia

- IUCN category V (protected landscape/seascape)
- Location within West Virginia
- Location: Pocahontas, West Virginia, United States
- Coordinates: 38°18′57″N 80°11′43″W
- Area: 784 acres (317 ha)
- Elevation: 3,169 ft (966 m)
- Operator: Wildlife Resources Section, WVDNR
- Website: WVDNR District 3 Wildlife Management Areas

Handley Wildlife Management Area is located on 784 acres (317 ha) northwest of Marlinton in Pocahontas County, West Virginia. It is near the headwaters of the Williams River in the Monongahela National Forest.

== See also ==
- Animal conservation
- Fishing
- Hunting
- List of West Virginia wildlife management areas
