= Shannondale Springs Wildlife Management Area =

State Wildlife Management Area in Jefferson County, West Virginia

- IUCN category V (protected landscape/seascape)
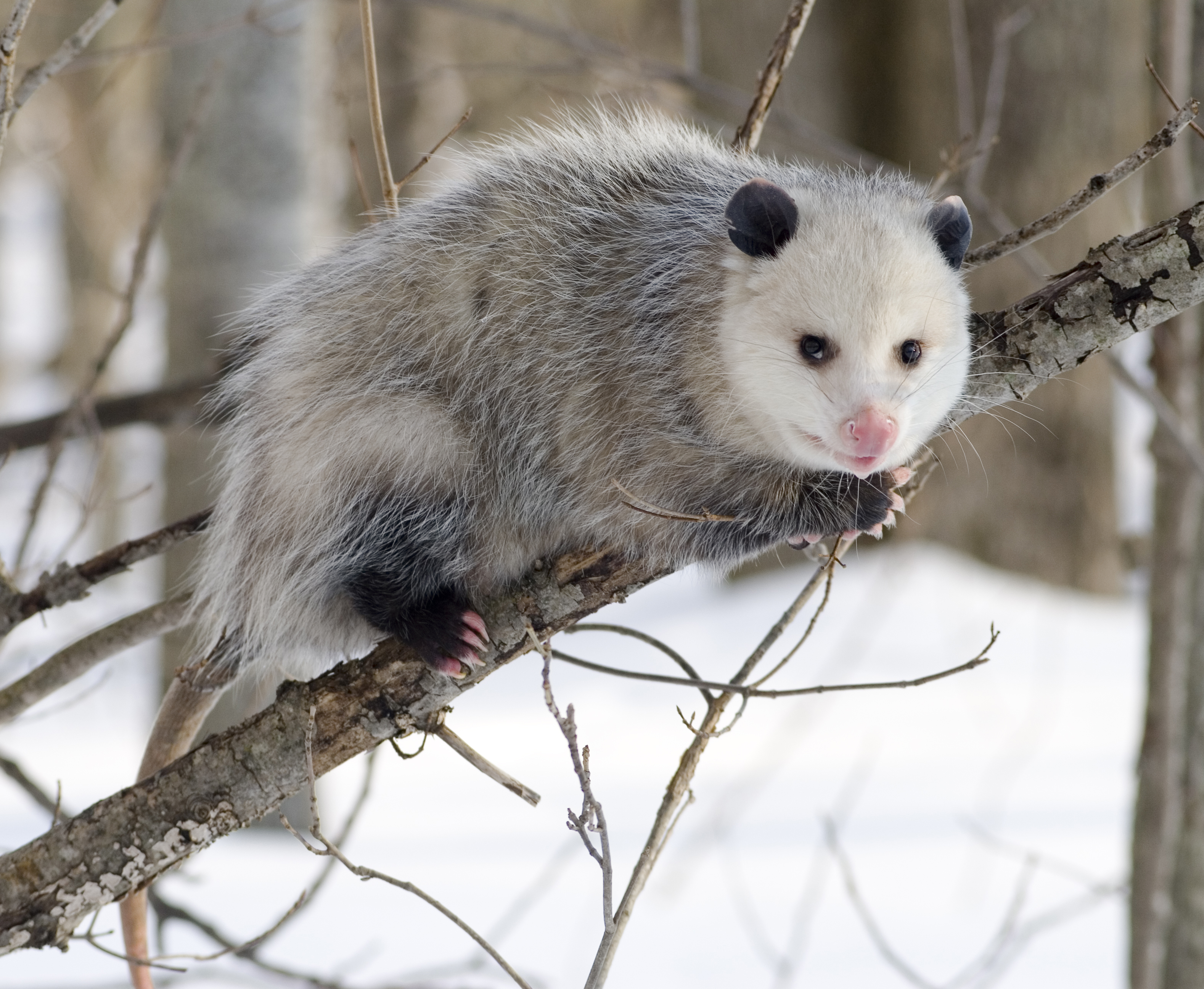
- Virginia opossum (Didelphis virginiana) may be found at the Shannondale Springs WMA

- Location within West Virginia
- Location: Jefferson, West Virginia, United States
- Coordinates: 39°13′13″N 77°48′58″W
- Area: 1,361 acres (5.51 km^{2})
- Elevation: 378 ft (115 m)
- Operator: Wildlife Resources Section, WV Division of Natural Resources

Shannondale Springs Wildlife Management Area is located near Charles Town, West Virginia in Jefferson County. Shannondale Springs WMA is located on 1,361 acres (551 ha) of hills covered with oak-hickory woodlands, brushy areas, and open fields.

The WMA is located 4 miles (6.4 km) east of Charles Town, along the Shenandoah River. Access is from Charles Town four miles along State Route 9 to Mission Road, then south on Mission Road to the WMA.

== Hunting, Trapping and Fishing ==
Hunting opportunities in Shannondale Springs WMA include deer, mourning dove, raccoon, squirrel, turkey, waterfowl, Bear and woodcock.

Trapping opportunities can include beaver, gray fox, red fox, mink, muskrat, opossum, raccoon, and skunk.

Fishing opportunities in the Shenandoah River include rock bass, smallmouth bass, channel catfish, and panfish.

Camping is not allowed at the WMA. A boat ramp is available to access the Shenandoah River.

== See also ==
- Animal conservation
- Animal trapping
- Hunting
- Fishing
- List of West Virginia wildlife management areas
