= Smoke Camp Wildlife Management Area =

State Wildlife Management Area in Lewis County, West Virginia

- IUCN category V (protected landscape/seascape)
- Location within West Virginia
- Location: Lewis, West Virginia, United States
- Coordinates: 39°09′16″N 80°36′27″W
- Area: 252 acres (102 ha)
- Elevation: 1,370 ft (420 m)
- Website: WVDNR District 3 Wildlife Management Areas

Smoke Camp Wildlife Management Area is located on 252 acres (102 ha) northwest of Weston in Lewis County, West Virginia.

== See also ==
- Conservation biology
- Fishing
- Hunting
- List of West Virginia wildlife management areas
