= Fairfax Pond-Rehe Wildlife Management Area =

State Wildlife Management Area in Preston County, West Virginia

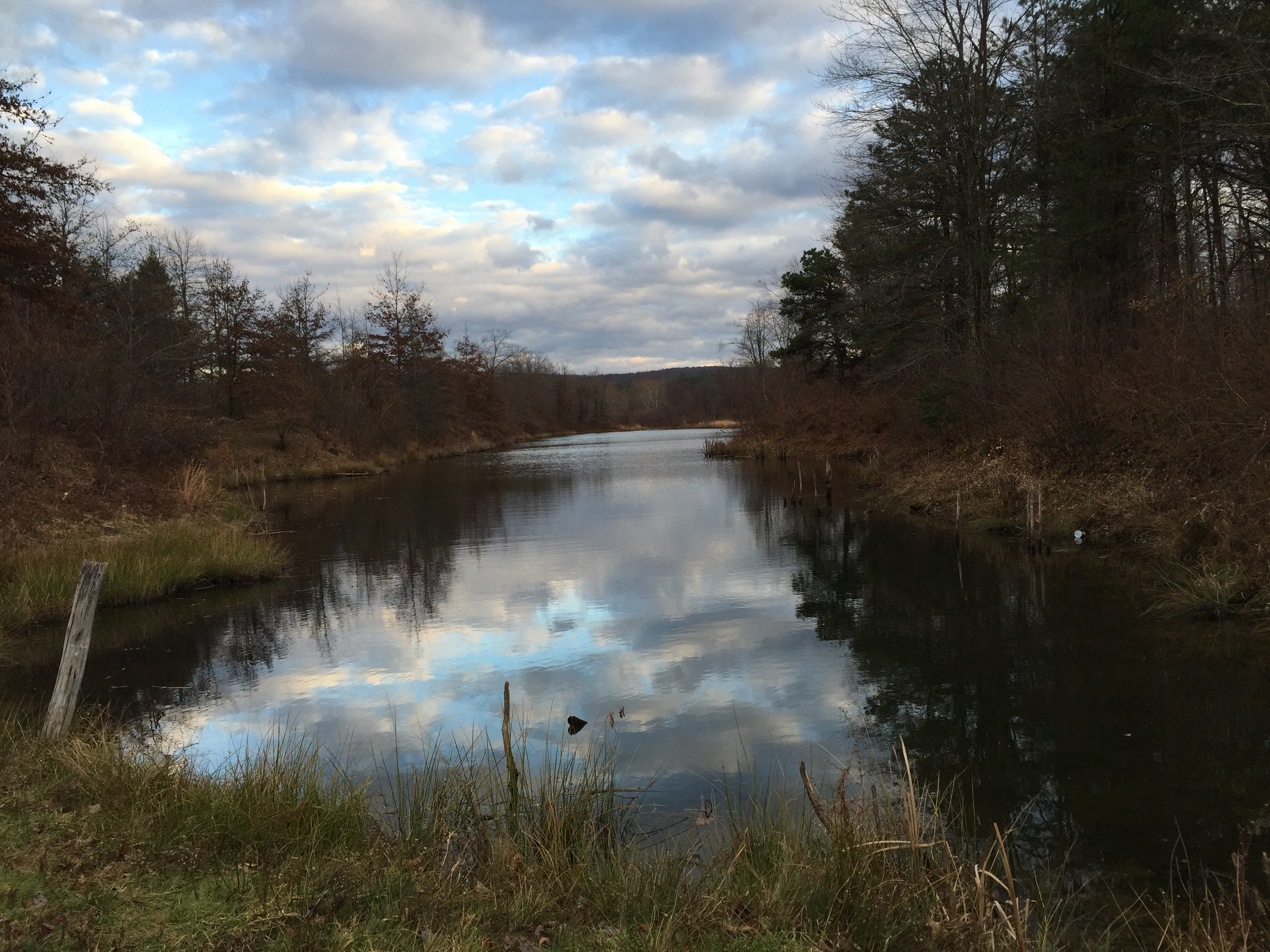
- Wetlands pond in November 2014

- Location within West Virginia
- Location: Preston, West Virginia, United States
- Coordinates: 39°29′38″N 79°47′56″W
- Area: 638 acres (258 ha)
- Elevation: 1,800 ft (550 m)
- Established: 2014
- Website: WVDNR District 1 Wildlife Management Areas

Fairfax Pond-Rehe Wildlife Management Area is located on 638 acres (258 ha) south of Reedsville in Preston County, West Virginia, United States. The wildlife management area is centered on a series of ponds and wetlands remaining from previous strip mining operations. The land was acquired in 2014.

Access to the Fairfax Pond – Rehe WMA can be gained from West Virginia Route 92 on Arthur Road (County Route 92/1) and Dogtown Road (County Route 56/2). Primary species for hunting include deer, wild turkey, waterfowl and grouse. Trapping for beaver, muskrat, raccoon and bobcat is available on the area. Fishing opportunities for largemouth bass, bluegill and other sunfish exist in two impoundments located on the WMA.

== See also ==
- Animal conservation
- Fishing
- Hunting
- List of West Virginia wildlife management areas
