= Springfield Wildlife Management Area =

Former protected area in West Virginia, US

- Location within West Virginia
- Location: Hampshire, West Virginia, United States
- Coordinates: 39°27′54″N 78°39′56″W
- Area: 1,700 acres (6.9 km^{2})
- Elevation: 1,080 ft (330 m)
- Established: April 1, 2004
- Operator: Wildlife Resources Section, WVDNR

The former Springfield Wildlife Management Area was located on approximately 1,700 acres (690 ha) in Hampshire County near Springfield, West Virginia. Created during the 1970s, the land was owned by MeadWestvaco.

Springfield WMA was abolished on April 1, 2004, when the West Virginia Division of Natural Resources' lease for the site expired after MeadWestvaco refused to renew it. The site was subsequently purchased by a developer who intended to during it into housing lots.

In May 2015, Potomac Conservancy purchased the land. They plan to place a conservation easement on the property and donate the land to the West Virginia Division of Natural Resources. At that time, the land will open as a public recreation area for camping, hiking, and hunting.

== See also ==
- Animal conservation
- Fishing
- Hunting
- List of West Virginia wildlife management areas
