= Ritchie Mines Wildlife Management Area =

State Wildlife Management Area in West Virginia, US

- IUCN category V (protected landscape/seascape)
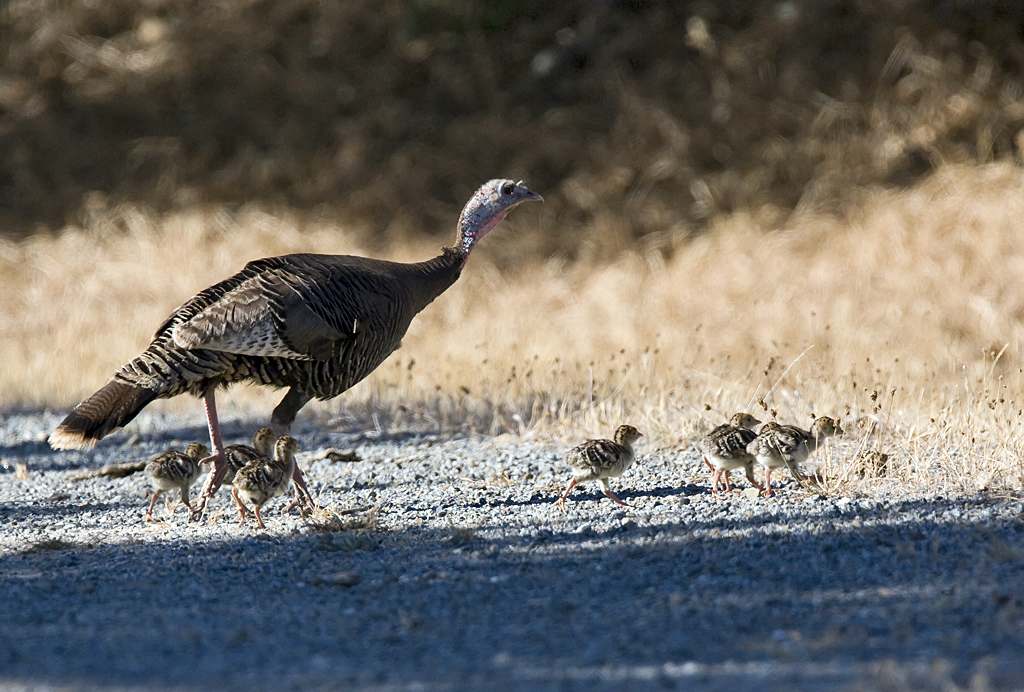
- Wild turkey (Meleagris gallopavo) may be found at the Ritchie Mines WMA

- Location within West Virginia
- Location: Ritchie, West Virginia, United States
- Coordinates: 39°06′16″N 81°08′55″W
- Area: 2,300 acres (9.3 km^{2})
- Elevation: 790 ft (240 m)
- Operator: Wildlife Resources Section, WV Division of Natural Resources

Ritchie Mines Wildlife Management Area, is located near Smithville, West Virginia, in Ritchie County. Ritchie Mines WMA is located on 2,300 acres (930 ha) of rugged, hilly woodlands.

To access the WMA from the south, follow Route 47 west 8 miles from Smithville to Macfarlan Creek Road. Follow Macfarlan Creek Road north to the WMA.

== Hunting and Fishing ==
Hunting opportunities in Pruntytown State Farm WMA include deer, grouse, raccoon, squirrel, and turkey.

Although camping is not allowed at the WMA, camping is available at nearby North Bend State Park. A historically significant asphalt mine is located on the WVA. Fishing is also available at North Bend.

== See also ==
- Animal conservation
- Hunting
- Fishing
- List of West Virginia wildlife management areas
