= Burches Run Wildlife Management Area =

State Wildlife Management Area in Marshall County, West Virginia

- IUCN category V (protected landscape/seascape)
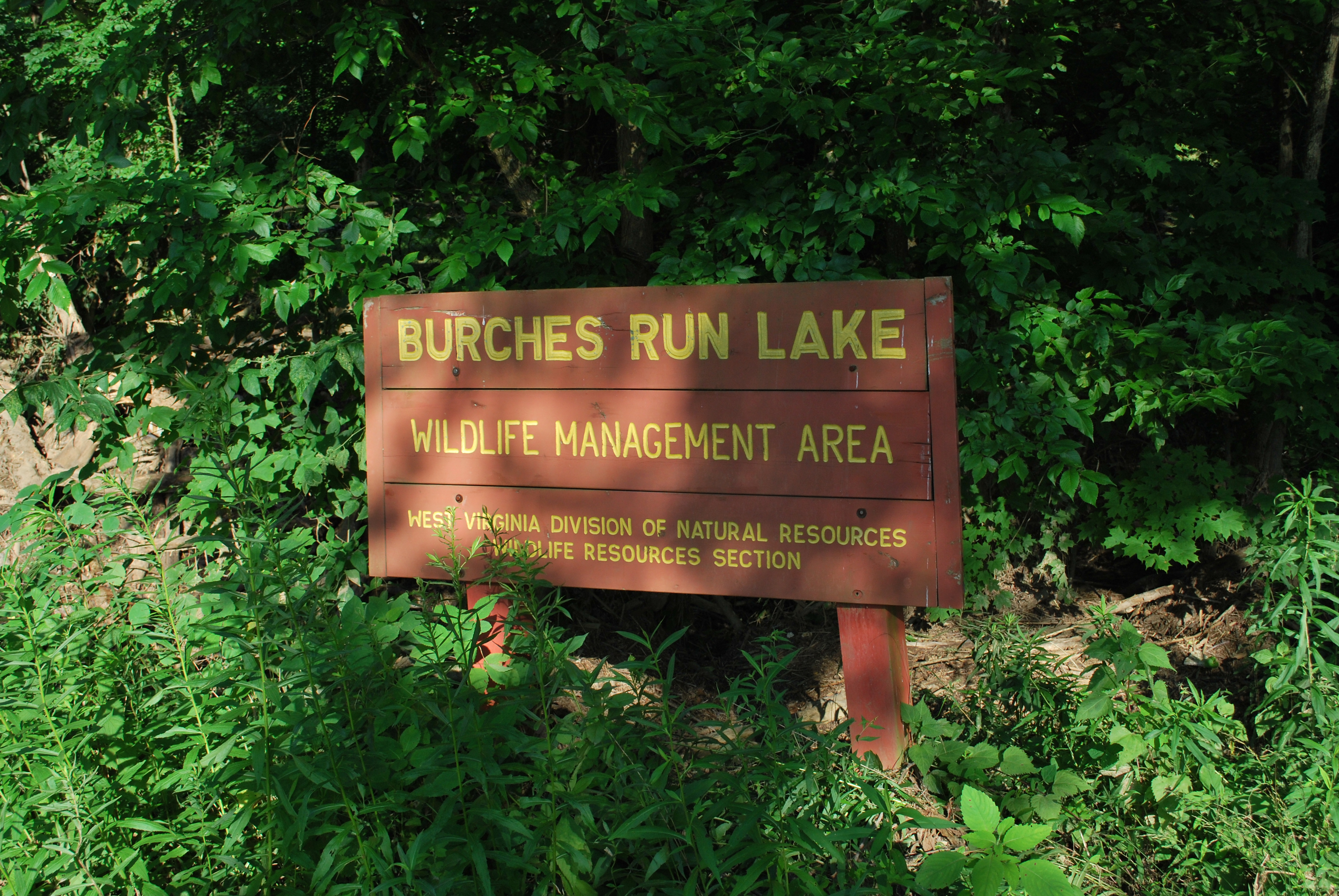
- Sign for the WMA, still not updated (as of June 2009) to reflect its name change.

- Location within West Virginia
- Location: Marshall, West Virginia, United States
- Coordinates: 39°58′25″N 80°37′38″W
- Area: 55 acres (22 ha)
- Elevation: 798 ft (243 m)
- Operator: Wildlife Resources Section, WVDNR

Burches Run Wildlife Management Area, formerly Burches Run Lake WMA, is located on 55 acres (22 ha) near Wheeling in Marshall County, West Virginia. Until 2005 the wildlife management area contained a lake impounded by a dam at risk of failure. The name change occurred after the dam was removed. The terrain climbs gently above Burches Run and is covered by a mature oak-hickory second-growth forest.

== Directions ==
Burches Run WMA is located at the intersection of Pine Hill Road and Big Wheeling Creek Road about 8 miles (13 km) south of Wheeling, Pine Hill Road, also designated as County Route 14 is accessed off of WV State Route 88. Big Wheeling Creek Road is accessed near the intersection of US Route 40 and I-70 at Elm Grove.

This map shows the WMA and where the lake that was removed used to be.

== Hunting ==
Hunting opportunities, limited by the small size of the area, include deer, squirrel, and water fowl. Camping is prohibited at this WMA.

== See also ==
- Animal conservation
- Buffalo Creek Flood
- List of dam failures
- List of West Virginia wildlife management areas
