= Slatyfork Wildlife Management Area =

State Wildlife Management Area in Pocahontas and Randolph counties, West Virginia

- Location within West Virginia
- Location: West Virginia, United States
- Coordinates: 38°24′51″N 80°07′33″W
- Area: 49 acres (20 ha)
- Elevation: 2,700 ft (820 m)
- Website: WVDNR District 3 Wildlife Management Areas

Slatyfork Wildlife Management Area is located on 49 acres (20 ha) north of Marlinton in Pocahontas and Randolph Counties, West Virginia. It protects a narrow strip of river bottom along the forks of Elk River headwaters.

== See also ==
- Animal conservation
- Fishing
- Hunting
- List of West Virginia wildlife management areas
