= Teter Creek Lake Wildlife Management Area =

State Wildlife Management Area in Barbour County, West Virginia

- IUCN category V (protected landscape/seascape)
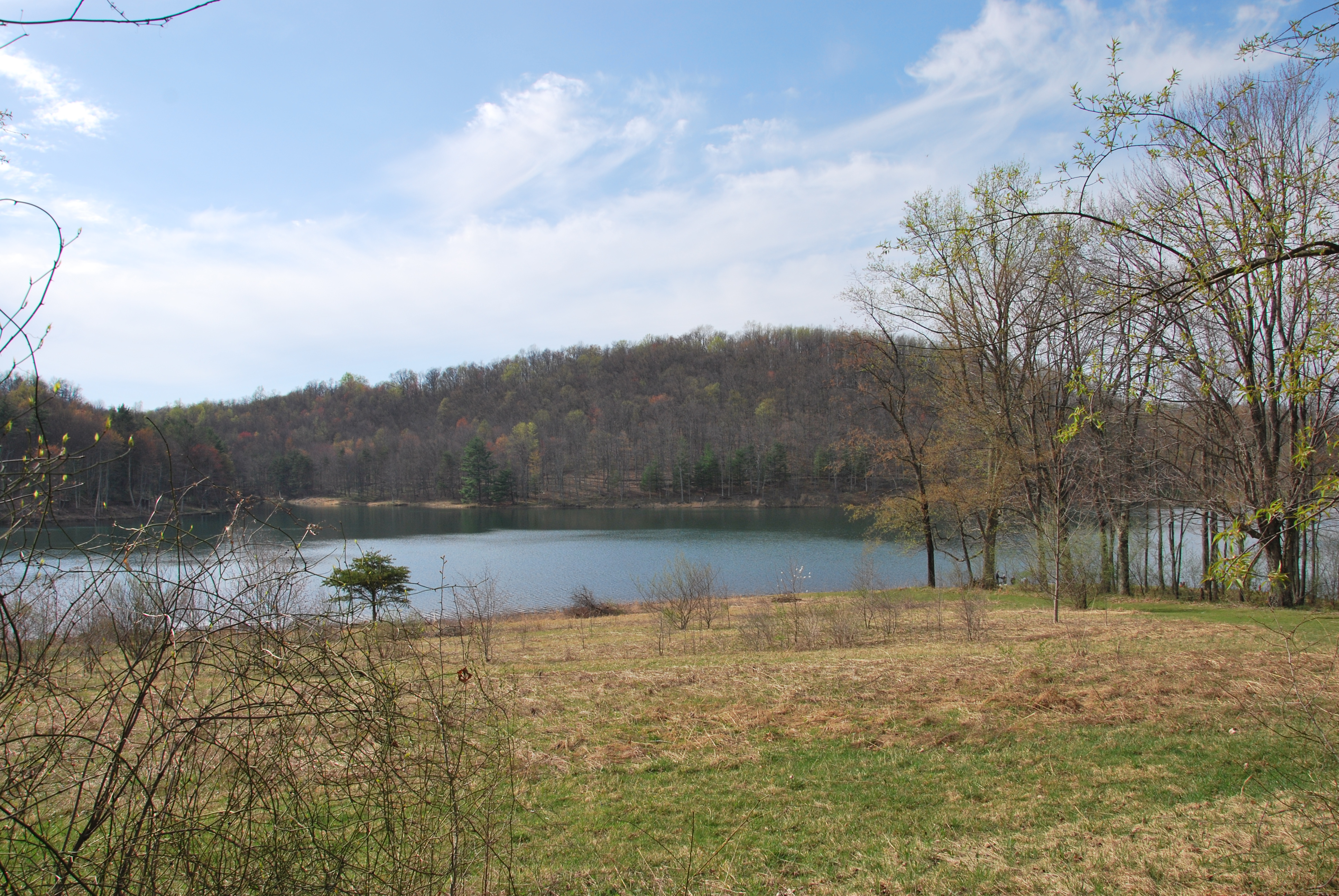
- Teter Creek Lake

- Location within West Virginia
- Location: Barbour, West Virginia, United States
- Coordinates: 39°06′34″N 79°52′17″W
- Area: 137 acres (55 ha)
- Elevation: 1,860 ft (570 m)

Teter Creek Lake Wildlife Management Area is located about 6 miles (9.7 km) northeast of Belington in Barbour County, West Virginia. It is located on 137 acres (55 ha) of sloping terrain along the shores of Teter Creek Lake.

== Hunting and fishing ==
Hunting opportunities in Teter Creek Lake WMA include deer, grouse, raccoon, squirrel, turkey and waterfowl. Hunting opportunities are limited by the small size of the WMA.

Fishing opportunities on the 35-acre (14 ha) Teter Creek Lake include largemouth bass, bluegill, channel catfish, tiger musky, and stocked trout. Only electric-powered motors are allowed on boats on Teter Creek Lake.

Rustic camping is available with 20 sites for tents or trailers at the WMA. A boat ramp and handicapped fishing trail are provided at the WMA.

== See also ==
- Animal conservation
- Hunting
- fishing
- List of West Virginia wildlife management areas
