= Thorn Creek Wildlife Management Area =

State Wildlife Management Area in Pendleton County, West Virginia

- IUCN category V (protected landscape/seascape)
- Location within West Virginia
- Location: Pendleton, West Virginia, United States
- Coordinates: 38°34′31″N 79°21′50″W
- Area: 528 acres (214 ha)
- Elevation: 1,960 ft (600 m)
- Operator: Wildlife Resources Section, WV Division of Natural Resources

Thorn Creek Wildlife Management Area, is located about 7 miles south of Franklin, West Virginia in Pendleton County. Thorn Creek WMA is located on 528 acres (214 ha) of steep terrain along hills above Thorn Creek.

The WMA is accessed from Thorn Creek Road about 4 miles off U.S. 219, south of Franklin.

== Hunting and Fishing ==
Hunting opportunities in Thorn Creek WMA include deer, squirrel, and turkey .

Thorn Creek is limited to fly fishing in the trout-filled Thorn Creek.

Rustic camping is not available at the WMA.

== See also ==
- Animal conservation
- Hunting
- fishing
- List of West Virginia wildlife management areas
