= Tug Fork Wildlife Management Area =

State Wildlife Management Area in McDowell County, West Virginia

- IUCN category V (protected landscape/seascape)
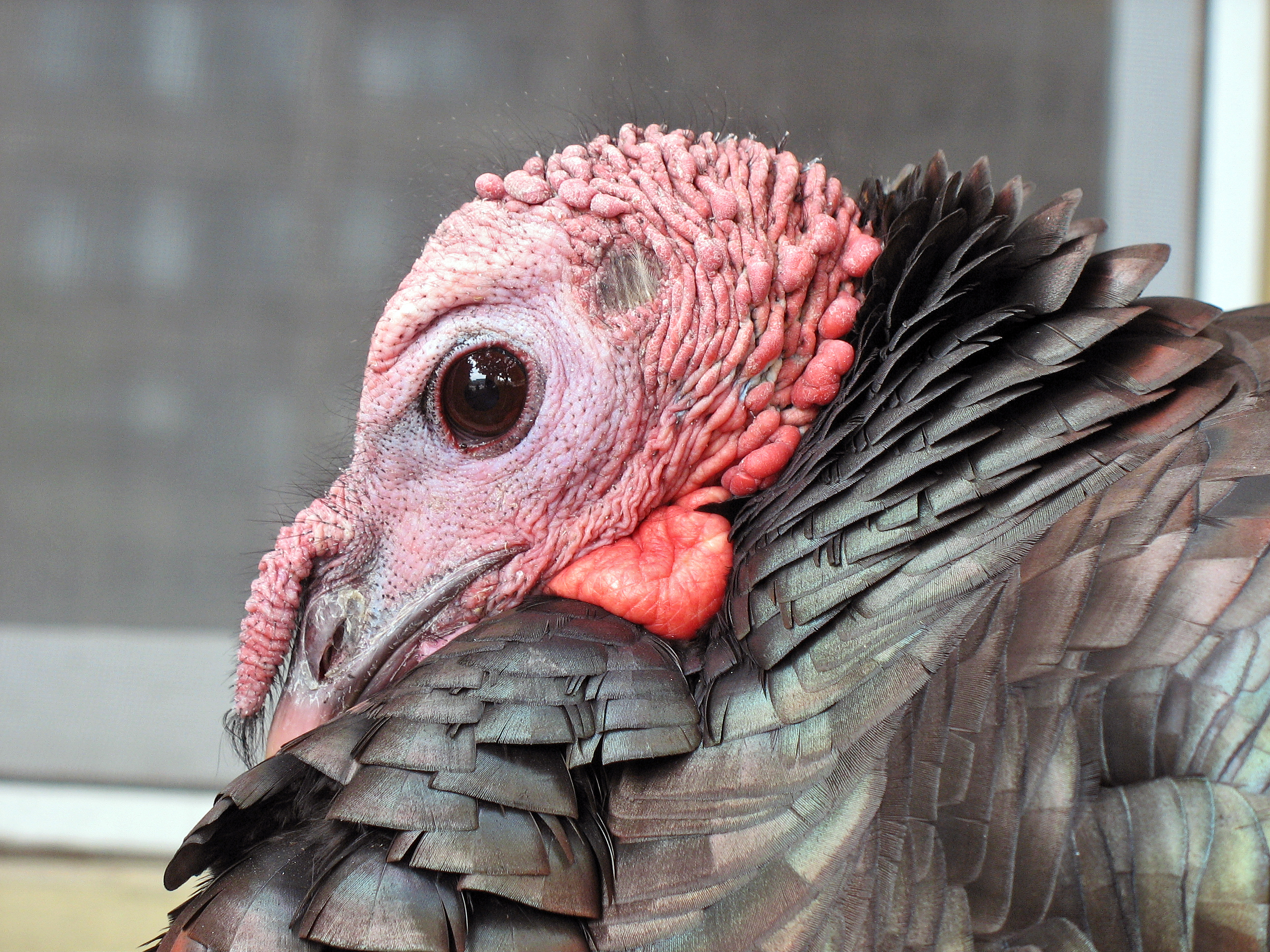
- Wild turkey (Meleagris gallopavo) may be found at the Tug Fork WMA

- Location within West Virginia
- Location: McDowell, West Virginia, United States
- Coordinates: 37°25′16″N 81°38′54″W
- Area: 2,165 acres (8.76 km^{2})
- Elevation: 1,440 ft (440 m)
- Operator: Wildlife Resources Section, WV Division of Natural Resources

Tug Fork Wildlife Management Area (WMA) is located about 10 miles northwest of Welch, West Virginia in McDowell County. Tug Fork WMA is located on 2,165 acres (876 ha) of steep terrain along hills above the Tug Fork River. The WMA is heavily forested, primarily with mixed hardwoods and yellow poplar/black cherry forests in the coves. The WMA is accessed from U.S. Route 52 at Premier. Several tracks and jeep trails provide walking access into the Tug Fork WMA from U.S. Route 52.

== Hunting and fishing ==
Hunting opportunities in Tug Fork WMA include bear, deer, grouse, squirrel, and turkey.

Tug Fork provides fishing opportunities for warm-water species.

Camping is not available at the WMA.

== See also ==
- Animal conservation
- Hunting
- fishing
- List of West Virginia wildlife management areas
