= Horse Creek Wildlife Management Area =

State Wildlife Management Area in Wyoming County, West Virginia

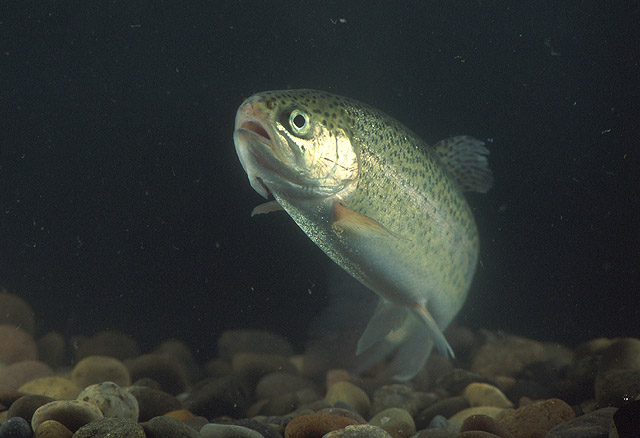
- Rainbow Trout (Oncorhynchus mykiss) may be found in the Horse Creek WMA

- Location within West Virginia
- Location: Wyoming, West Virginia, United States
- Coordinates: 37°34′29″N 81°42′34″W
- Area: 47.9 acres (19.4 ha)
- Elevation: 1,187 ft (362 m)
- Operator: Wildlife Resources Section, WV Division of Natural Resources

Horse Creek Wildlife Management Area is located in Wyoming County near Pineville, West Virginia. Located on 47.9 acres (19.4 ha) that includes a small lake, the open fields of the WMA are bordered by steep hardwood forest.

To reach the Horse Creek WMA from Pineville, follow WV Route 97 west about 16.5 miles (26.6 km) to Horse Creek Road (County Route 816). Turn left (east) on Horse Creek Road for about 1 mile (1.6 km) to Horse Creek Lake and the Horse Creek WMA.

== Hunting and Fishing ==
Hunting opportunities are limited by the small acreage of the Horse Creek WMA. Prospects for hunting include deer, raccoon, and squirrel.

Fishing opportunities in the 5 acres (2.0 ha) Horse Creek Lake include largemouth bass, bluegill, channel catfish and trout.

Camping is not permitted in the WMA.

== See also ==
- Animal conservation
- Fishing
- Hunting
- List of West Virginia wildlife management areas
