= Widmeyer Wildlife Management Area =

State Wildlife Management Area in Morgan County, West Virginia

- IUCN category V (protected landscape/seascape)
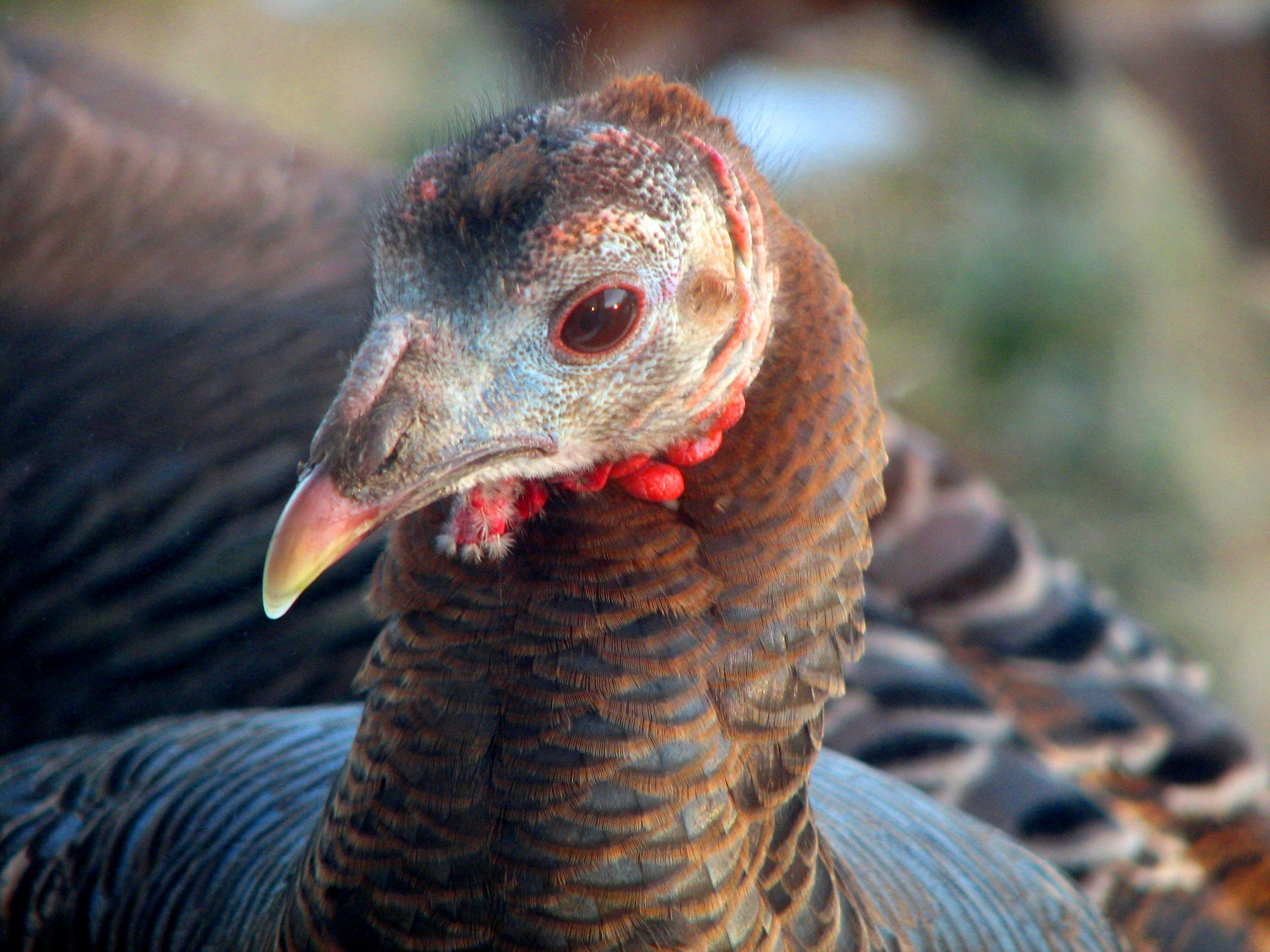
- Wild turkey (Meleagris gallopavo) may be found at the Widmeyer WMA

- Location within West Virginia
- Location: Morgan, West Virginia, United States
- Coordinates: 39°38′42″N 78°13′44″W
- Area: 422 acres (171 ha)
- Elevation: 690 ft (210 m)
- Operator: Wildlife Resources Section, WV Division of Natural Resources

Widmeyer Wildlife Management Area, is located about 3 miles (4.8 km) north of Great Cacapon, West Virginia in Morgan County. Widmeyer WMA is located on 422 acres (171 ha) of upland hills above the Potomac River.

The WMA is accessed from Bennett Lane off Cacapon Road (WV Route 9) between Great Cacapon and Berkeley Springs.

== Hunting and fishing ==
Hunting opportunities in the WMA include deer, squirrel, and turkey.

Camping is not available at the WMA.

== See also ==
- Animal conservation
- Hunting
- List of West Virginia wildlife management areas
