= Sand Hill Wildlife Management Area =

State Wildlife Management Area in Wood and Ritchie counties, West Virginia

- IUCN category V (protected landscape/seascape)
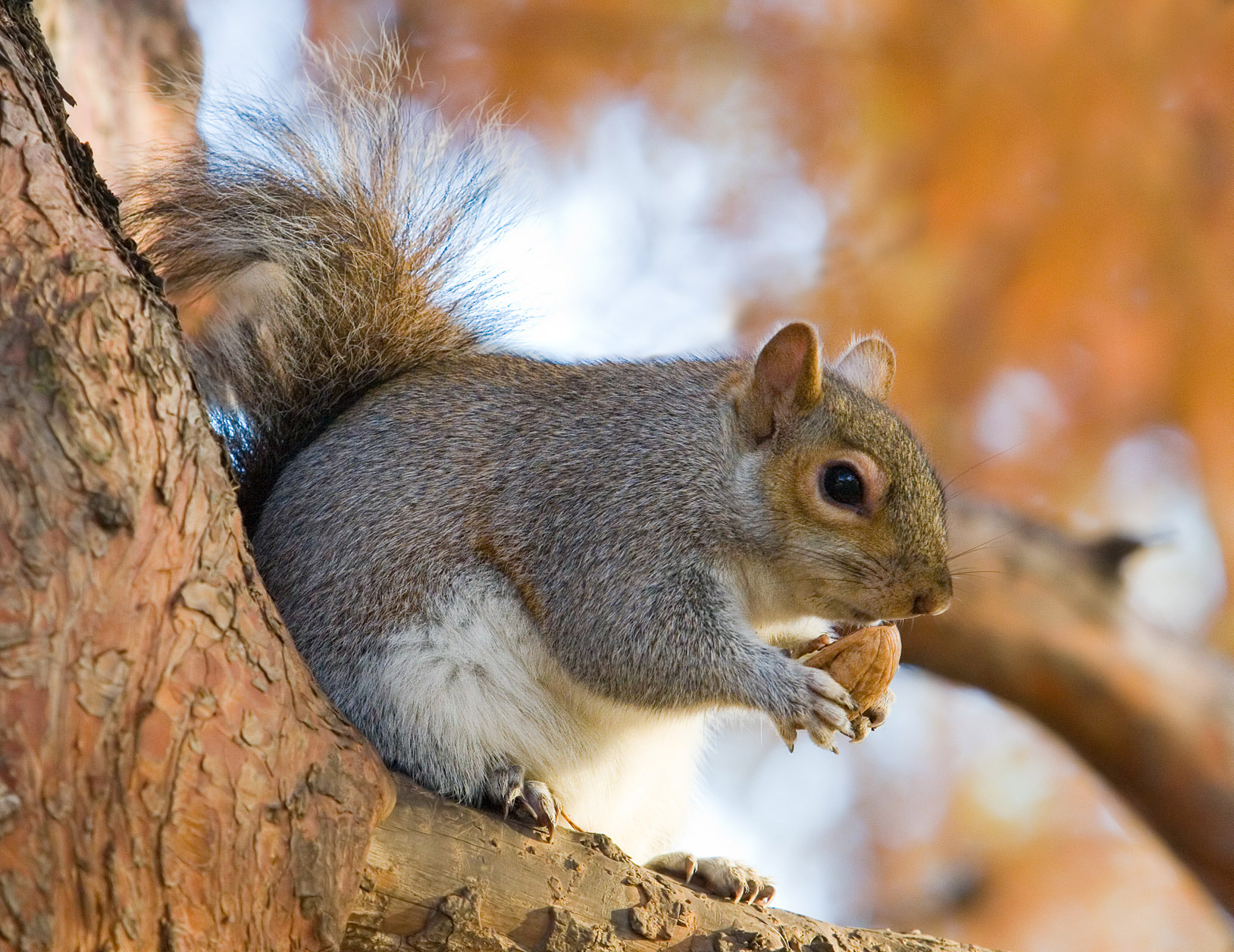
- Eastern Grey Squirrel (Sciurus carolinensis) may be found at the Sand Hill WMA

- Location within West Virginia
- Location: Wood and Ritchie, West Virginia, United States
- Coordinates: 39°15′23″N 81°16′04″W
- Area: 1,987 acres (8.04 km^{2})
- Elevation: 1,200 ft (370 m)
- Operator: Wildlife Resources Section, WV Division of Natural Resources

Sand Hill Wildlife Management Area is located near Parkersburg, West Virginia in Wood and Ritchie counties. Sand Hill WMA is located on 1,987 acres (804 ha) of rugged, hilly oak-hickory woodlands interspersed with timber, oil and gas development sites.

The WMA is located on both sides of U.S. Route 50 at the Wood/Ritchie county line, about 12 miles (19 km) east of Parkersburg. Access to the northern section is from old US 50 at the county line. Access to the southern end of the WMA is from Volcano Road off the Mountwood Park exit of US 50.

== Hunting and Fishing ==
Hunting opportunities in Sand Hill WMA include deer, grouse, rabbit, squirrel, and turkey.

Although camping is not allowed at the WMA, camping is available at nearby North Bend State Park. A large firearm safety area is maintained around a mine on the northern section. Fishing is also available at North Bend.

== See also ==
- Animal conservation
- Hunting
- Fishing
- List of West Virginia wildlife management areas
