= Cross Creek Wildlife Management Area =

State Wildlife Management Area in Brooke County, West Virginia

- IUCN category V (protected landscape/seascape)
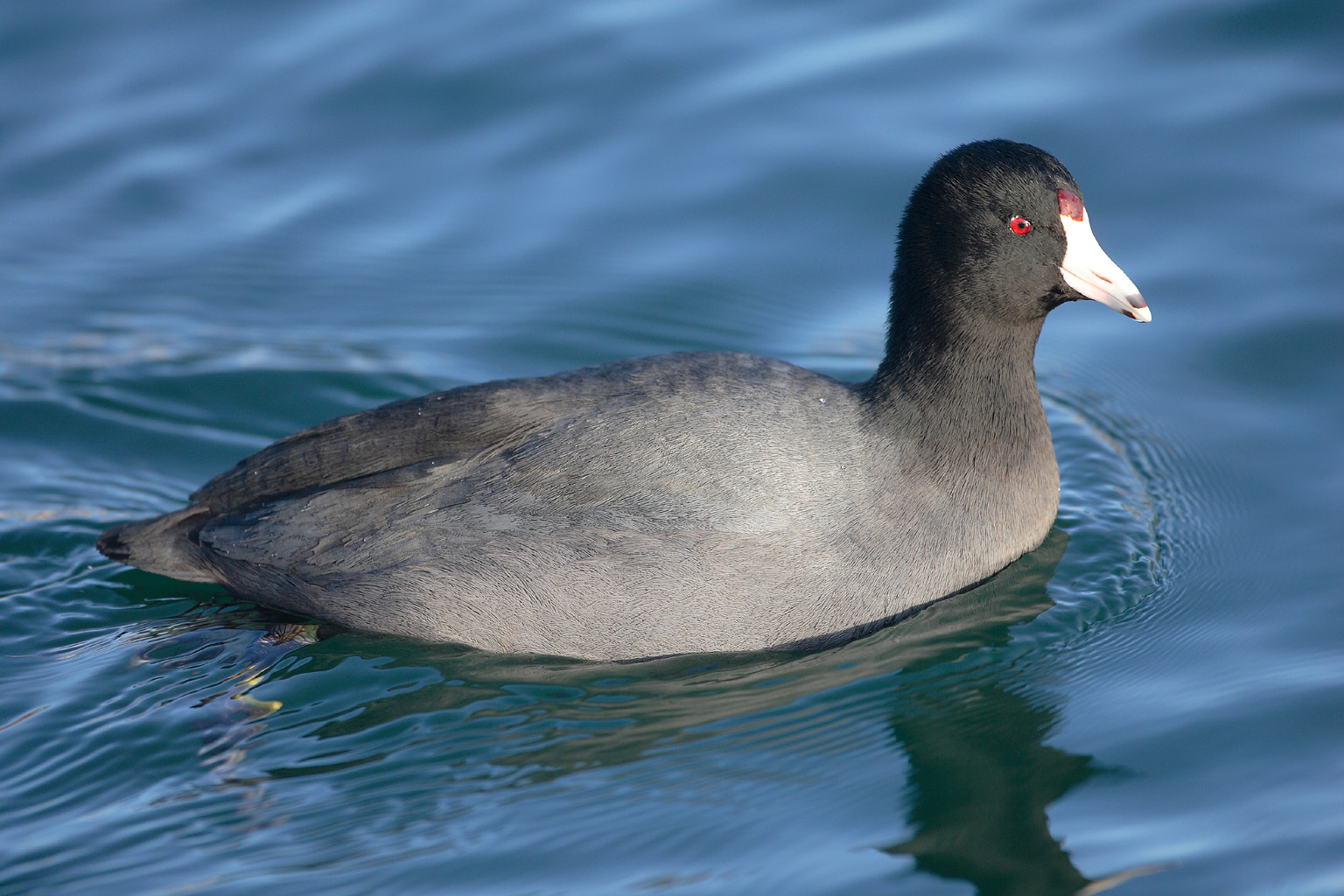
- American Coot (Fulica americana) may be found in the Cross Creek WMA

- Location within West Virginia
- Location: Brooke, West Virginia, United States
- Coordinates: 40°17′34″N 80°31′26″W
- Area: 2,078 acres (8.41 km^{2})
- Elevation: 805 ft (245 m)
- Operator: Wildlife Resources Section, WVDNR

Cross Creek Wildlife Management Area, named after Cross Creek which flows through its southern part, is located on 630 acres (250 ha) in Brooke County near Wellsburg, West Virginia. Mixed hardwoods cover most of the former strip mine site. The rolling terrain is punctuated with a few highwalls and ponds. Cross Creek WMA can be reached by State Route 7 about 6 miles (9.7 km) northeast of Wellsburg.

== Hunting and Fishing ==
Hunting opportunities include deer, grouse, turkey and waterfowl. Cross Creek provides fishing opportunities for smallmouth bass, largemouth bass, bluegill and channel catfish, as well as stocked trout.

Camping is prohibited on the Cross Creek WMA land.

== See also ==
- Animal conservation
- Fishing
- Hunting
- List of West Virginia wildlife management areas
