= Green Bottom Wildlife Management Area =

State Wildlife Management Area in Cabell and Mason counties, West Virginia

- IUCN category V (protected landscape/seascape)
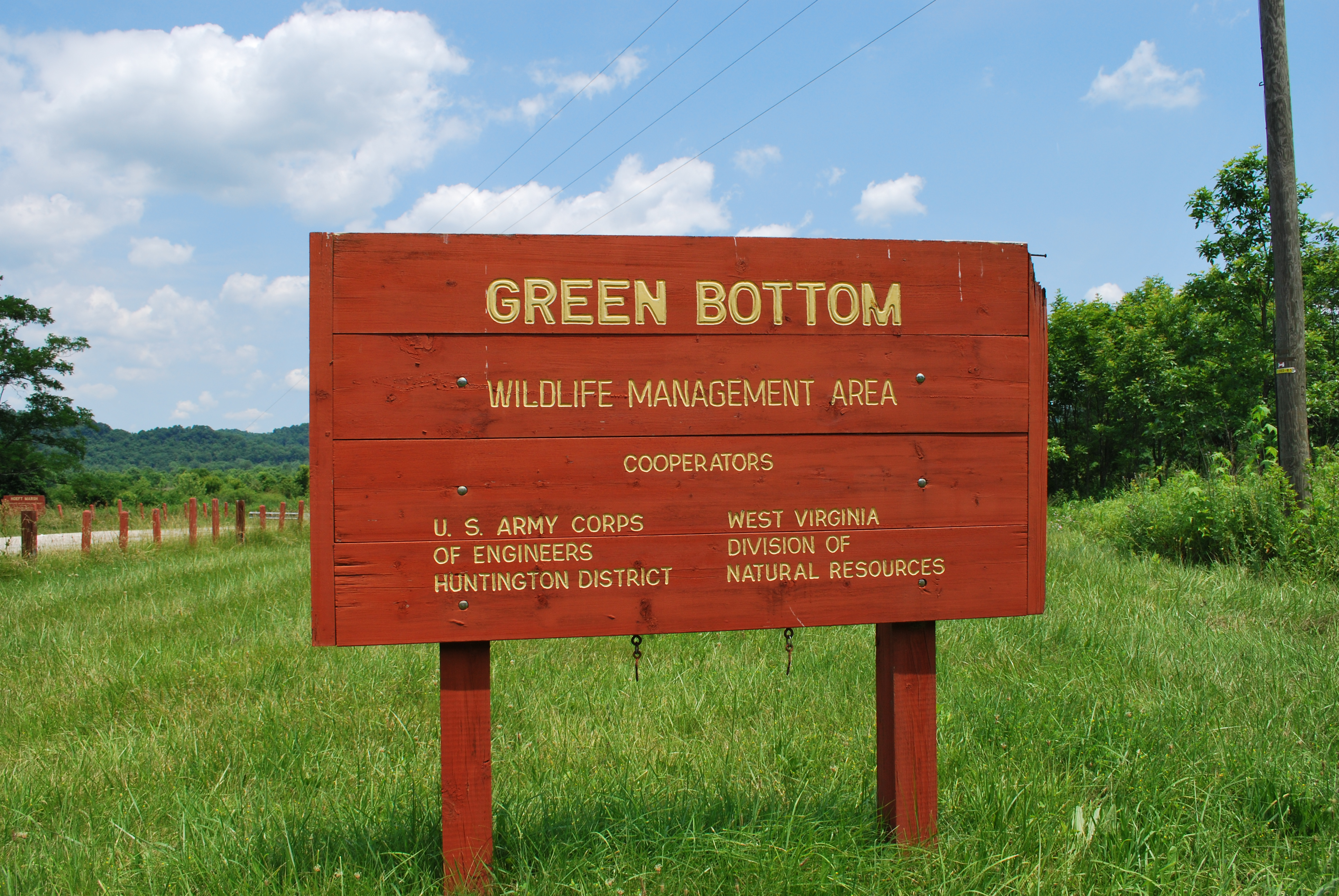
- Entrance sign for Green Bottom WMA

- Location within West Virginia
- Location: West Virginia, United States
- Coordinates: 38°35′19″N 82°14′37″W
- Area: 1,096 acres (4.44 km^{2})
- Elevation: 540 ft (160 m)
- Operator: Wildlife Resources Section, WVDNR

Green Bottom Wildlife Management Area is located on former plantation lands of U.S. Congressman and Confederate General Albert G. Jenkins. The 1,096 acres (444 ha) in Cabell County and Mason County are located along the banks of the Ohio River about 16 miles (26 km) north of Huntington, West Virginia. The Green Bottom WMA land is a mixture of farmland, mixed hardwood forest, wetlands, and open water. The Jenkins Plantation Museum is located on Corps of Engineers land adjacent to the WMA. The museum is located in the original 1835 Green Bottom Plantation House, and is operated by the West Virginia Division of Culture and History.

== Hunting and fishing ==
Fishing opportunities abound at Green Bottom from in the wetlands, along the banks of the Ohio River, and from boats using the local boat ramp. Popular game fish in the Ohio River include smallmouth bass, sauger, channel catfish, hybrid striped bass, carp, crappie, and freshwater drum. The state record bowfin fish was caught at Green Bottom.

Available hunting can include deer, rabbit, mourning dove, squirrel, and waterfowl. Deer hunting is permitted only with muzzle loading rifles or archery bows. Camping is not permitted in the WMA.

== Wildlife watching ==
Green Bottom WMA is also a popular location for watching wildlife. Over 100 species of birds are regularly seen each year along the river bottom. More than 30 mammals, as well as several amphibians and reptiles, are available for viewing. Structures such as nesting boxes and man-made islands have been built to improve the habitats for species ranging from the Jefferson salamander to the gray fox. The Green Bottom Nature Trail and boardwalk provides easier access to the wetlands and forest lands of the WMA.

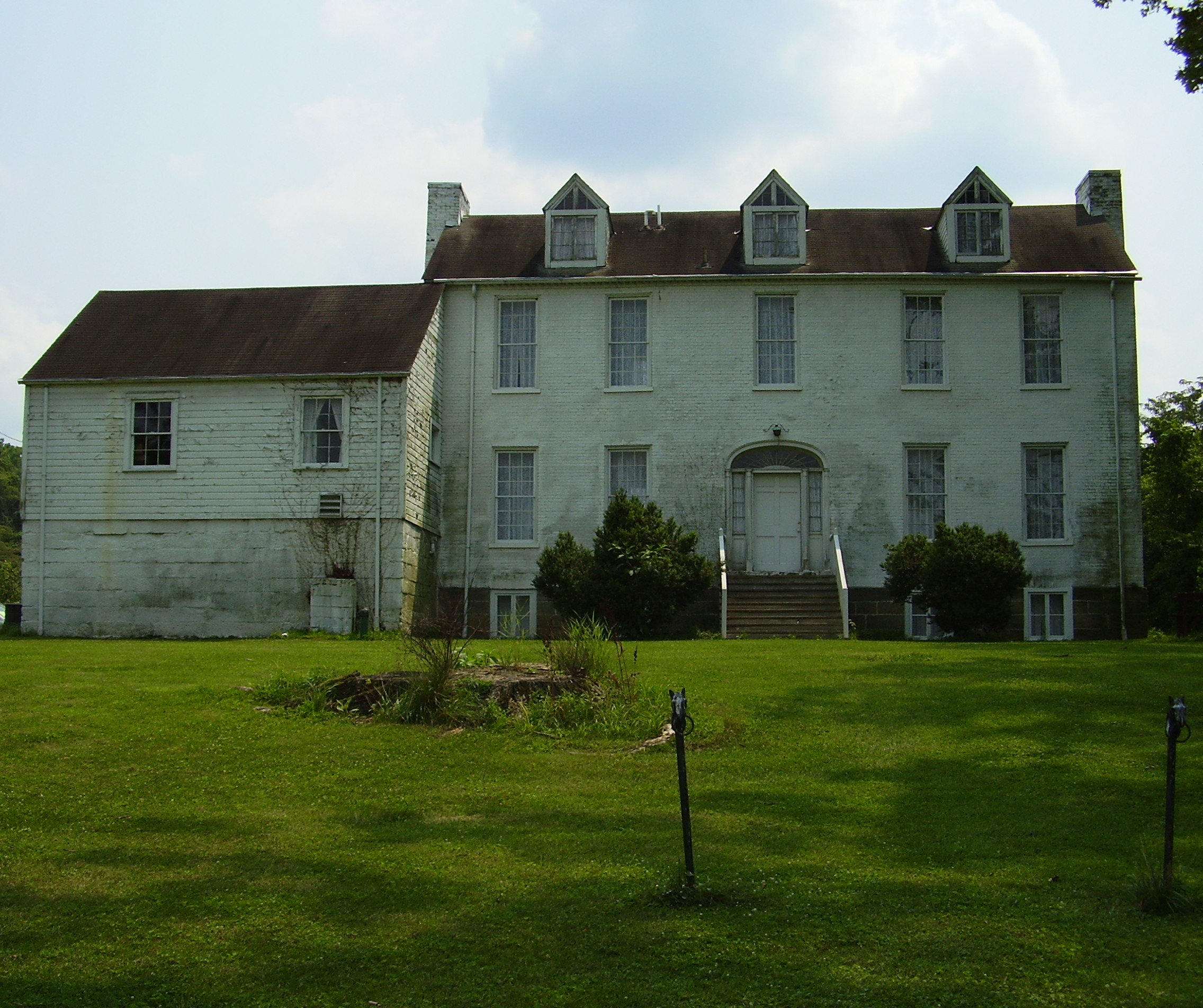
Green Bottom House, now the Jenkins Plantation Museum, is located adjacent to the Green Bottom WMA.

== See also ==
- Animal conservation
- Birdwatching
- Fishing
- Hiking
- Hunting
- Kayaking
- List of West Virginia wildlife management areas
