= Hillcrest Wildlife Management Area =

State Wildlife Management Area in Hancock County, West Virginia

- IUCN category V (protected landscape/seascape)
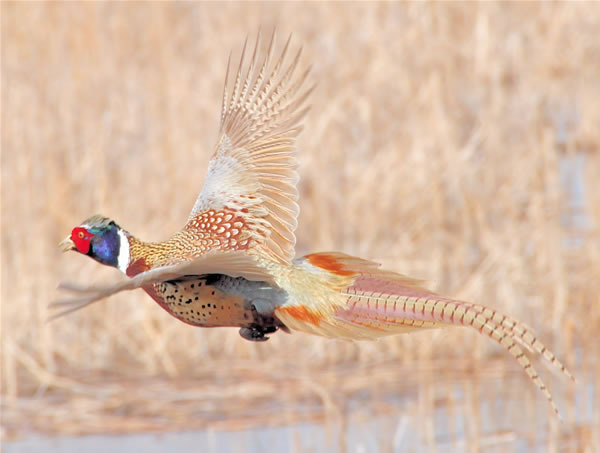
- The ringnecked pheasant (Phasianus colchicus) may be found in the Hillcrest WMA

- Location within West Virginia
- Location: Hancock, West Virginia, United States
- Coordinates: 40°32′57″N 80°32′23″W
- Area: 2,212 acres (8.95 km^{2})
- Elevation: 1,078 ft (329 m)
- Operator: Wildlife Resources Section, WV Division of Natural Resources

Hillcrest Wildlife Management Area is located in Hancock County near New Cumberland, West Virginia. Located on 2,212 acres (895 ha) of former farmland, the flat bottoms and rolling hills provide open fields, old orchards and small forest lots.

From New Cumberland, follow WV Route 8 east about 4 miles (6.4 km) to Gas Valley Road. Turn right (east) on Gas Valley Road, and follow about 1.3 miles (2.1 km) to Middle Run Road. Follow Middle Run Road north to the Hillcrest WMA.

== Hunting ==
Hunting opportunities are varied in the Hillcrest WMA, and can include deer, mourning dove, grouse, rabbit, pheasant, squirrel, and turkey.

Camping is not permitted in the WMA.

== See also ==
- Animal conservation
- Fishing
- Hunting
- List of West Virginia wildlife management areas
