= Briery Mountain Wildlife Management Area =

Former protected area in West Virginia, US

- Location within West Virginia
- Location: Preston County, West Virginia, United States
- Coordinates: 39°24′56″N 79°38′59″W
- Area: 1,162 acres (4.70 km^{2})
- Elevation: 1,880 ft (570 m)
- Established: 2011
- Operator: Wildlife Resources Section, WVDNR

The former Briery Mountain Wildlife Management Area was located on 1,162 acres (470 ha) near Kingwood in Preston County, West Virginia. The wildlife management area was part of the Camp Dawson Army Training Center, owned by the West Virginia State Armory Board. Briery Mountain WMA was sited on Briery Mountain, overlooking Camp Dawson and the Cheat River valley. The land had been cooperatively managed by the WV State Armory Board and the WV Division of Natural Resources. Construction of a live-fire range forced the permanent closure of the WMA.

== Hunting ==
Hunting is not permitted on the former wildlife area. Before the ban in 2011, a special, free, annual hunting permit was required from Camp Dawson headquarters to hunt on Briery Mountain. The area had been occasionally closed when military training exercises are conducted.

== See also ==
- Animal conservation
- Hunting
- List of West Virginia wildlife management areas
- National Guard of the United States
- Recreational fishing
