= Kumbrabow State Forest =

State Forest in Randolph County, West Virginia

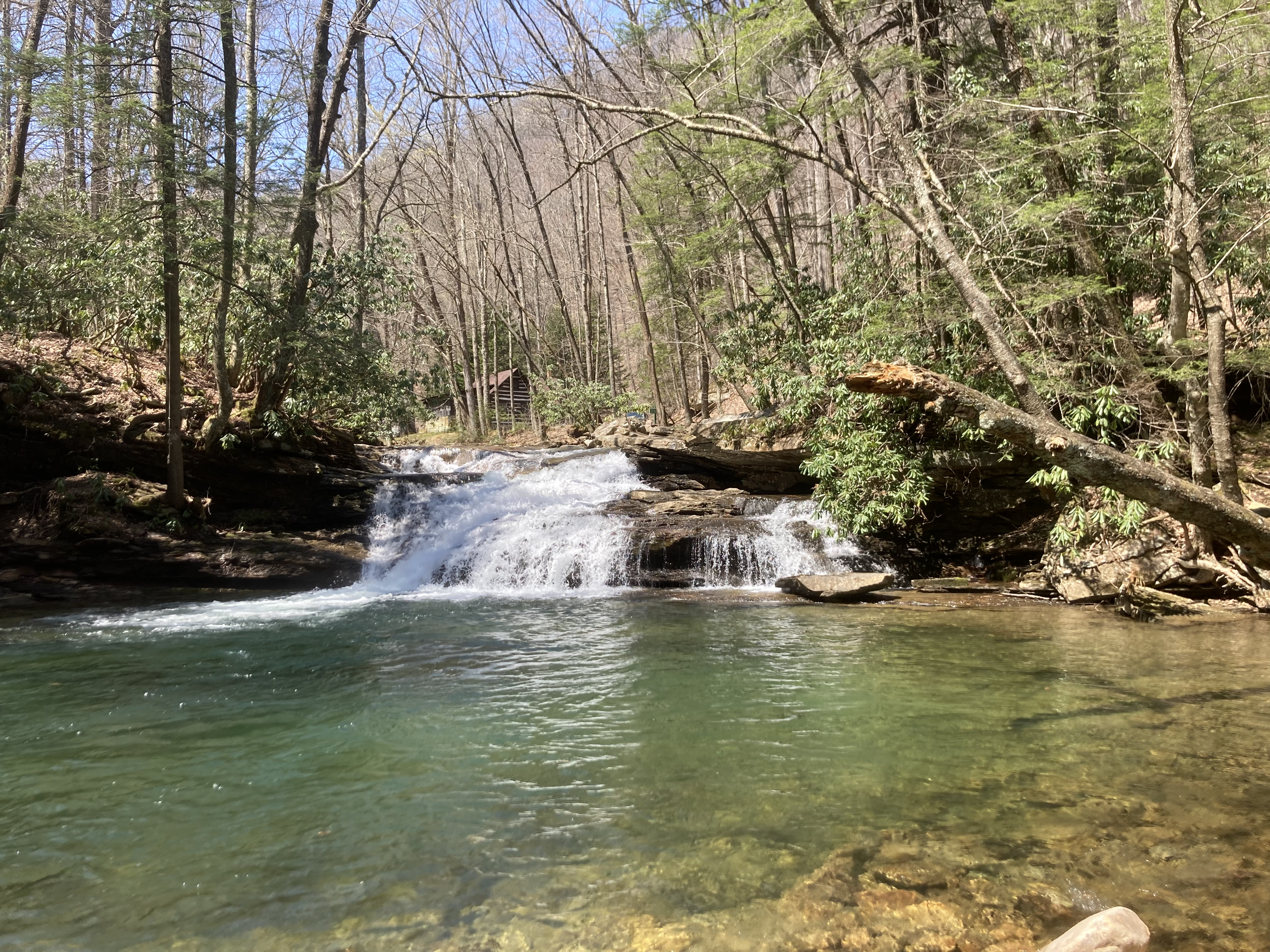
- Mill Creek Falls

- Location within West Virginia
- Location: Randolph, West Virginia, United States
- Coordinates: 38°38′19″N 80°05′54″W
- Area: 9,474 acres (38.34 km^{2})
- Elevation: 3,507 ft (1,069 m)
- Established: December 29, 1934
- Named for: KUMp-BRAdy-BOWers, families involved in the forest land purchase
- Operator: West Virginia Division of Natural Resources and West Virginia Division of Forestry
- Website: wvstateparks.com/park/kumbrabo-state-forest/

Kumbrabow State Forest is a state forest in southern Randolph County, West Virginia. It is 9,474 acres (38.34 km^{2}) in size.

== Climate ==
At an altitude of 3235 ft (986 m), Kumbrabow has a warm-summer humid continental climate (Köppen Dfb). It features cooler winters and summers than what is typical for West Virginia.

Climate data for Kumbrabow, West Virginia, 1991–2020 normals, 1940-2020 extremes: 3235ft (986m)
Month	Jan	Feb	Mar	Apr	May	Jun	Jul	Aug	Sep	Oct	Nov	Dec	Year
Record high °F (°C)	72 (22)	68 (20)	78 (26)	82 (28)	88 (31)	88 (31)	89 (32)	91 (33)	91 (33)	83 (28)	76 (24)	72 (22)	91 (33)
Mean maximum °F (°C)	56.0 (13.3)	56.0 (13.3)	67.2 (19.6)	75.5 (24.2)	79.3 (26.3)	81.4 (27.4)	81.0 (27.2)	80.9 (27.2)	79.2 (26.2)	73.5 (23.1)	66.9 (19.4)	57.0 (13.9)	82.2 (27.9)
Mean daily maximum °F (°C)	34.4 (1.3)	38.7 (3.7)	45.4 (7.4)	56.9 (13.8)	65.6 (18.7)	71.6 (22.0)	75.1 (23.9)	74.2 (23.4)	69.1 (20.6)	59.8 (15.4)	48.5 (9.2)	37.6 (3.1)	56.4 (13.5)
Daily mean °F (°C)	25.0 (−3.9)	29.6 (−1.3)	34.3 (1.3)	45.3 (7.4)	55.0 (12.8)	61.4 (16.3)	65.4 (18.6)	64.2 (17.9)	58.4 (14.7)	48.5 (9.2)	37.8 (3.2)	29.3 (−1.5)	46.2 (7.9)
Mean daily minimum °F (°C)	15.7 (−9.1)	20.5 (−6.4)	23.2 (−4.9)	33.6 (0.9)	44.3 (6.8)	51.1 (10.6)	55.7 (13.2)	54.2 (12.3)	47.7 (8.7)	37.2 (2.9)	27.1 (−2.7)	21.0 (−6.1)	35.9 (2.2)
Mean minimum °F (°C)	−5.4 (−20.8)	−1.6 (−18.7)	5.9 (−14.5)	19.3 (−7.1)	29.5 (−1.4)	39.2 (4.0)	45.7 (7.6)	44.6 (7.0)	34.5 (1.4)	24.2 (−4.3)	13.1 (−10.5)	5.1 (−14.9)	−6.8 (−21.6)
Record low °F (°C)	−26 (−32)	−17 (−27)	−22 (−30)	7 (−14)	15 (−9)	24 (−4)	35 (2)	34 (1)	20 (−7)	7 (−14)	−7 (−22)	−17 (−27)	−26 (−32)
Average precipitation inches (mm)	5.28 (134)	5.49 (139)	6.34 (161)	5.35 (136)	6.66 (169)	5.56 (141)	5.71 (145)	4.99 (127)	4.02 (102)	4.03 (102)	3.86 (98)	5.75 (146)	63.04 (1,600)
Average snowfall inches (cm)	29.9 (76)	21.9 (56)	17.7 (45)	5.8 (15)	trace	0.0 (0.0)	0.0 (0.0)	0.0 (0.0)	0.0 (0.0)	2.9 (7.4)	6.4 (16)	19.0 (48)	103.6 (263.4)
Source 1: NOAA
Source 2: XMACIS (1997-2014 snowfall, temp records & monthly max/mins)
