= Dents Run Wildlife Management Area =

State Wildlife Management Area in Marion County

- Location within West Virginia
- Location: Marion, West Virginia, United States
- Coordinates: 39°32′43″N 80°23′18″W
- Area: 1,226 acres (4.96 km^{2})
- Elevation: 1,010 ft (310 m)
- Established: 2010
- Operator: West Virginia Division of Natural Resources
- Website: WVDNR District 1 Wildlife Management Areas

Dents Run Wildlife Management Area is located on 1,226 acres (496 ha) near Mannington in Marion County, West Virginia. It includes a 30-acre (0.12 km^{2}) lake and will provide hunting opportunities for deer, wild turkey, squirrel, and other species.

Dents Run was leased from CONSOL Energy by the West Virginia Division of Natural Resources and dedicated on September 24, 2010.
