= Turkey Run Wildlife Management Area =

State Wildlife Management Area in Jackson County, West Virginia

- IUCN category V (protected landscape/seascape)
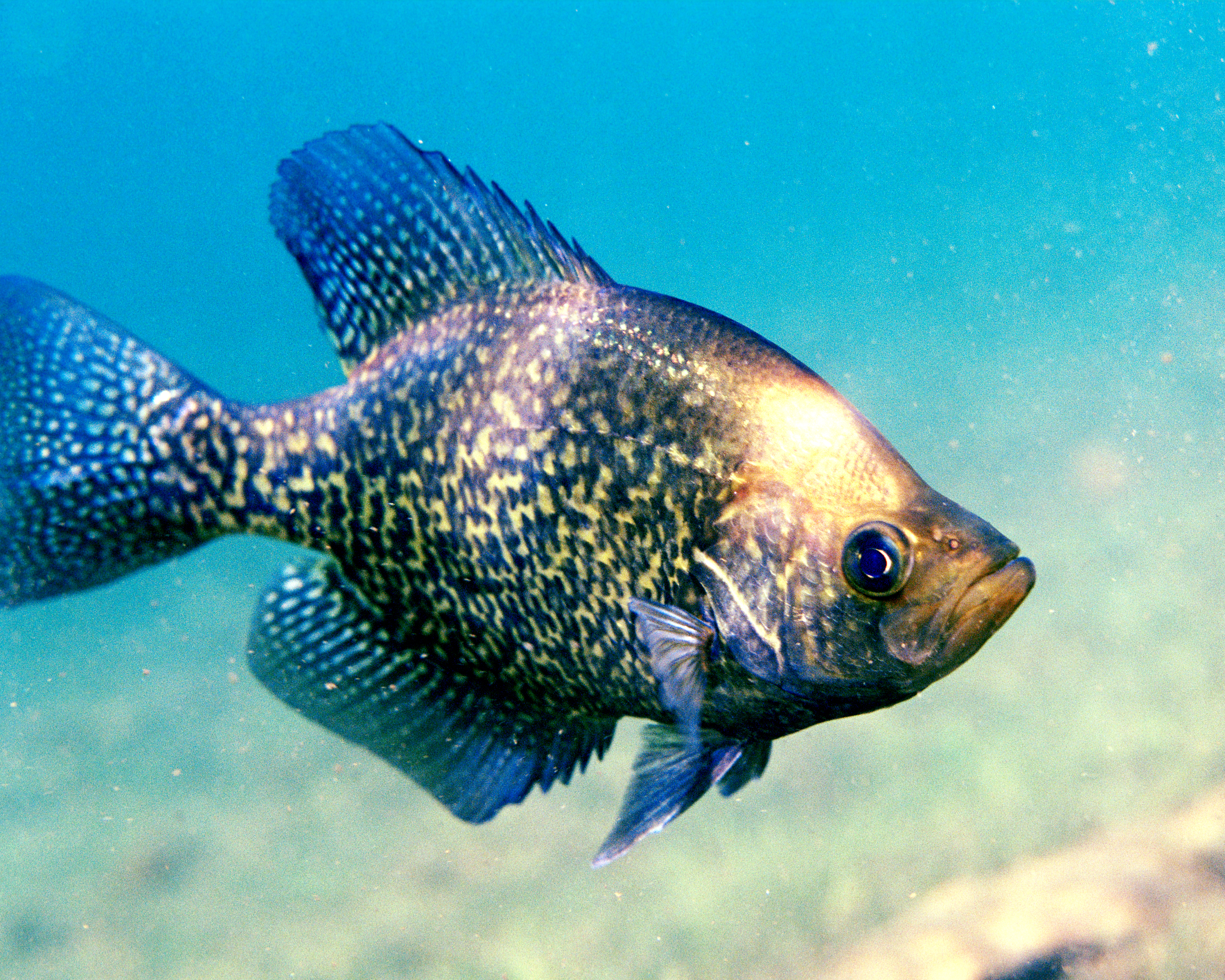
- Crappie (Pomoxis nigromaculatus) may be found at the Turkey Run WMA

- Location within West Virginia
- Location: Jackson, West Virginia, United States
- Coordinates: 38°58′06″N 81°46′23″W
- Area: 27 acres (11 ha)
- Elevation: 584 ft (178 m)
- Operator: Wildlife Resources Section, WV Division of Natural Resources

Turkey Run Wildlife Management Area, is located immediately north of Ravenswood, West Virginia in Jackson County. Turkey Run WMA is located on 27 acres (11 ha), consisting of a fishing lake and some small wooded hills around the lake.

The WMA is accessed from State Route 68 on the north side of Ravenswood.

== Hunting and Fishing ==
Hunting opportunities are very limited by the small size of the WMA and the nearby housing.

Turkey Run provides fishing opportunities largemouth bass, bluegill, channel catfish, crappie, and stocked trout in the winter.

Camping is not available at the WMA.

== See also ==
- Animal conservation
- fishing
- List of West Virginia wildlife management areas
