= Morris Creek (South Dakota) =

Stream in South Dakota, USA

Coordinates: 44°14′45″N 103°09′47″W

Morris Creek is a stream in the U.S. state of South Dakota.

Morris Creek has the name of Sam Morris, a local convicted felon.

== See also ==
- List of rivers of South Dakota
