= Valley Bend Wildlife Management Area =

State Wildlife Management Area in Randolph County, West Virginia

- IUCN category V (protected landscape/seascape)
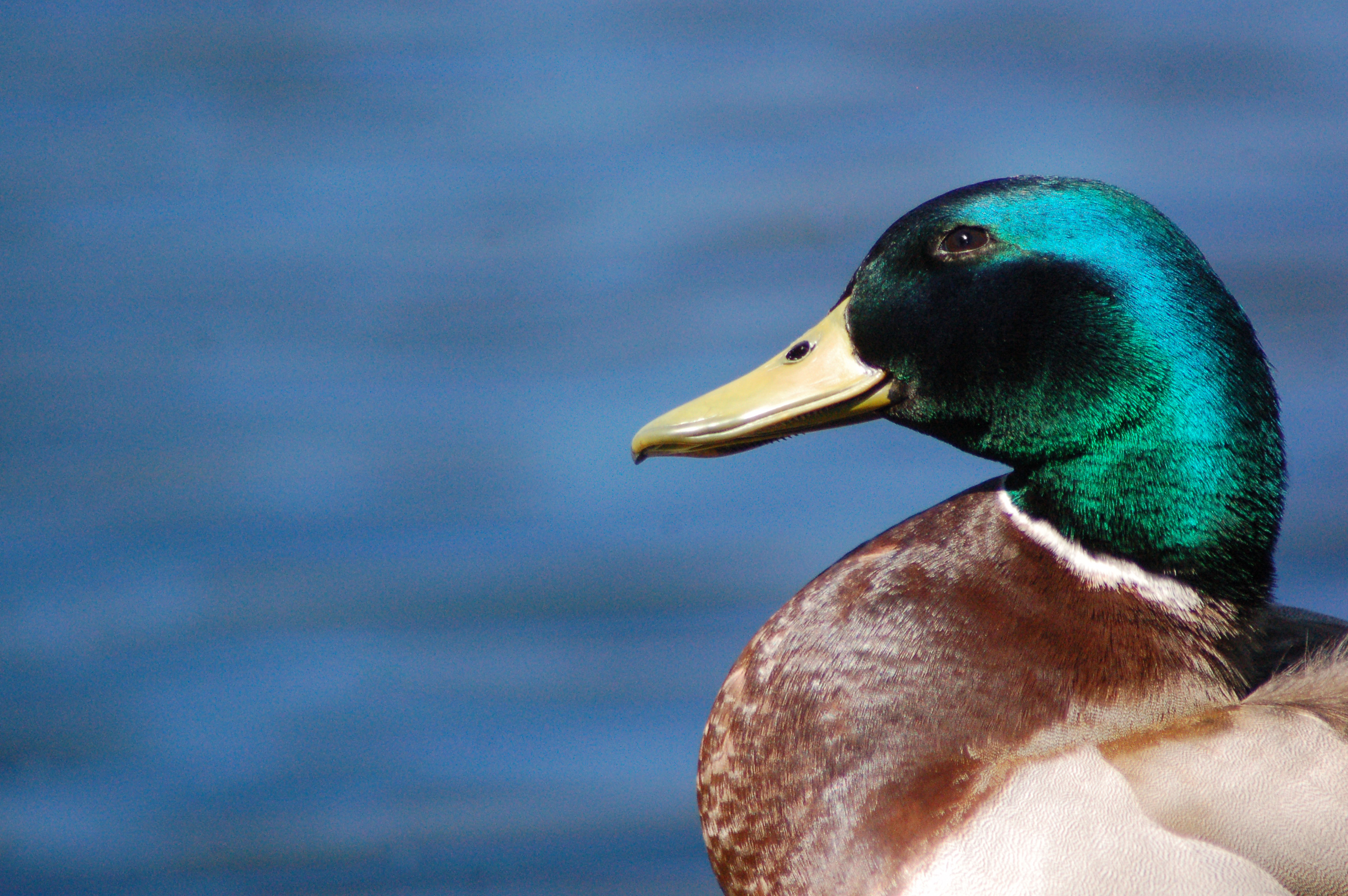
- A male Mallard Duck (Anas platyrhynchos) may be found in the Valley Bend WMA

- Location within West Virginia
- Location: Randolph, West Virginia, United States
- Coordinates: 38°46′10″N 79°56′05″W
- Area: 31 acres (13 ha)
- Elevation: 1,988 ft (606 m)
- Website: WVDNR District 3 Wildlife Management Areas

Valley Bend Wildlife Management Area is located on 31 acres (13 ha) southwest of Valley Bend in Randolph County, West Virginia.
