= Morris Creek Wildlife Management Area =

State Wildlife Management Area in Clay and Kanawha counties, West Virginia

- IUCN category IV (habitat/species management area)
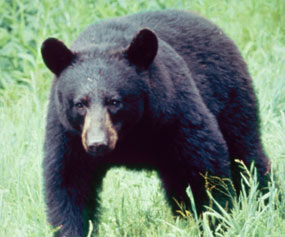
- American black bear (Ursus americanus) may be found in the Morris Creek WMA

- Location within West Virginia
- Location: West Virginia, United States
- Coordinates: 38°28′49″N 81°18′36″W
- Area: 9,874 acres (39.96 km^{2})
- Elevation: 620 ft (190 m)
- Operator: Wildlife Resources Section, WV Division of Natural Resources

Morris Creek Wildlife Management Area was a wildlife management area near Clendenin, West Virginia in Clay and Kanawha counties. It was located on 9,874 acres (3,996 ha) of steeply forested woodlands.

The area was closed in August 2021 after the land's owners decided not to renew their lease with the West Virginia Division of Natural Resources.

== See also ==
- Animal conservation
- Fishing
- Hunting
- List of West Virginia wildlife management areas
