= Northern District, Jackson County, West Virginia =

- Magisterial district
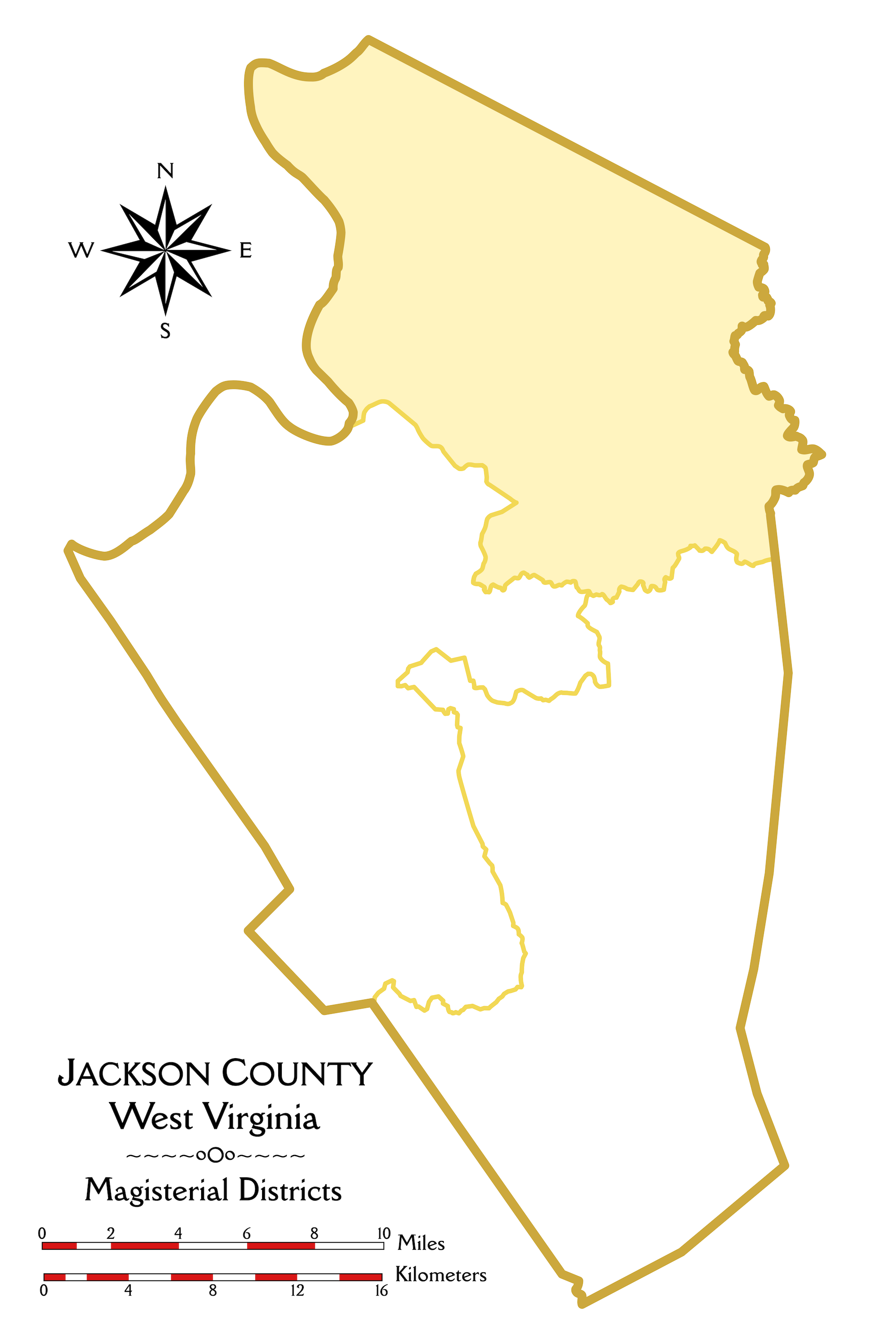
- Location of Northern District in Jackson County
- Coordinates: 38°58′22″N 81°39′26″W
- Country: United States
- State: West Virginia
- County: Jackson
- Established: 1990s

Area
  - Total: 155.30 sq mi (402.2 km^{2})
  - Land: 151.73 sq mi (393.0 km^{2})
  - Water: 3.57 sq mi (9.2 km^{2})
- Elevation: 906 ft (276 m)

Population (2010)
  - Total: 8,753
  - Density: 56/sq mi (22/km^{2})
- Time zone: UTC-5 (Eastern (EST))
  - Summer (DST): UTC-4 (EDT)

The Northern Magisterial District is one of three magisterial districts in Jackson County, West Virginia, United States. It was established during a process of redistricting undertaken in the 1990s. In 2010, 8,753 people lived in the district.

== Geography ==
The Northern District occupies an area roughly corresponding to the northern third of Jackson County. To the north, it is bounded by Harris and Steele Districts in Wood County, to the east by the Southwest District of Wirt County, to the southeast by District I in Roane County, to the south by the Eastern and Western Districts of Jackson County, and to the west by the Ohio River; across the river are Lebanon and Olive Townships in Meigs County, Ohio.

Most of the district is hilly, with a soil predominantly composed of various clays. There are fertile bottomlands, characterized by sandy soils, along the Ohio River and the larger creeks, particularly the areas around Muses Bottom and the city of Ravenswood. The district includes Buffington Island, a large island in the Ohio River above Ravenswood.

=== Streams ===
The main streams of the Northern District all flow west or northwest, and empty into the Ohio River. Little Pond Creek flows through the northern end of the district, and enters Wood County, where it joins Pond Creek before meeting the Ohio just north of the county line. Little Sandy Creek flows into the Ohio River above Ravenswood. Sandy Creek drains the center of the district with its various tributaries, including the Lockhart Fork, Nesselroad Run, Turkey Fork, Right Fork, Trace Fork, and Straight Fork, meeting the Ohio at Ravenswood.

=== Communities ===
The only incorporated town in the district is the city of Ravenswood. With a population estimated at 3,668 in 2018, it is the largest city in Jackson County. The area of Ravenswood was originally surveyed and patented by George Washington before the Revolutionary War, and the town laid out by his heirs in 1836.

In addition to Ravenswood, there are numerous small unincorporated villages, spread throughout the district, mostly along the Ohio River and the various creeks. Communities located along the River include Lone Cedar, Neptune, Murraysville, Muses Bottom, Polk, Morgan, Skull Run, Portland Station, and Sherman.

In the northern part of the district, Topins Grove and Willowdale are located on Little Pond Creek; Utica is on the Cabin Fork of Big Pond Creek, most of which is in Wood County; Low Gap is on Skull Run; and Cuba and Sherman are located along Little Sandy Creek.

Villages along Sandy Creek and its tributaries in the Northern District include Crow Summit, Drift Run, Duncan, Garfield, Independence, Jones Crossing, Le Roy, Liverpool, Lockhart, McClain, Meadowdale, Medina, Murray, New Era, Odaville, Sandyville, Wilding, and Wiseburg; Nuzums, Silverton, and The Y are on the boundary between the Northern and Western Districts.

=== Roads and transportation ===
The main north–south routes in the Northern District are West Virginia Route 68, which runs along the Ohio River from Ravenswood to Parkersburg, and County Road 21, known locally as the Parkersburg Road, which passes through the district between Ripley and Parkersburg, passing through Sandyville in the Northern District. Interstate 77 travels through the center of the district between Ripley and Parkersburg, with exits at Silverton and Medina.

The main east–west routes include U.S. Route 33, which crosses the Ohio River at Ravenswood, and continues through the district to Silverton; Old West Virginia Route 56, from Silverton to the Parkersburg Road south of Sandyville; and Liverpool Road, which runs from Sandyville to Liverpool, then enters Roane County, continuing to Reedy.

A railroad follows the Ohio River through the district, running between Point Pleasant and Parkersburg. The line originally belonged to the Baltimore and Ohio Railroad, and is now part of CSX.

== History ==
Historical population
Census	Pop.	Note	%±
2000	8,808		—
2010	8,753		−0.6%
2017 (est.)	8,478		−3.1%
United States Census Bureau, U.S. Decennial Census, 2000, 2010.

Although George Washington and his associates surveyed and patented lands along the Ohio River at the modern site of Ravenswood in 1772, but the Revolution and threat of Indian warfare forestalled settlement of the area for the remainder of the eighteenth century. The first European settlers in Ravenswood District arrived in 1807, and settled at Muses Bottom. More settlers arrived over the next two decades, clearing land for agriculture, and building grist mills and sawmills along the creeks.

Until 1831, the territory that would become Jackson County divided between Mason, Wood, and Kanawha Counties. Most of the Northern District was originally part of Wood County, but the site of Ravenswood was in Mason County. While there were settlers in the vicinity of Ravenswood, the town was not laid out until 1836, when the Washington heirs began to subdivide the land and sell it in parcels.

After West Virginia was admitted to the Union in 1863, the counties were divided into civil townships, which were converted into magisterial districts in 1872. Jackson County was divided into five magisterial districts: Grant, Ravenswood, Ripley, Union, and Washington. Except for minor adjustments, the names and boundaries of the historic districts remained largely unchanged from the 1870s until the 1990s, when the county was redistricted in order to equalize the area and population of its magisterial districts as nearly as possible.

All of Grant District was combined with most of Ravenswood District to form the Northern Magisterial District. The southwestern portion of Ravenswood District was added to the new Western Magisterial District, although the city of Ravenswood remained in the Northern District. The southeastern boundary of the Northern District follows the original boundary of Ravenswood District, while the southwestern boundary follows U.S. Route 35 and Old West Virginia 56 to The Y, then runs south along the Parkersburg Road until it meets the original line of Ravenswood District. Because redistricting proved confusing with county records, the West Virginia Legislature provided for the original magisterial districts to continue in the form of tax districts, which continued to serve administrative functions other than the apportionment of county officials. The current magisterial districts are used for those functions requiring equal representation between the residents of the various district, and as such are currently the minor civil division of record for the United States Census Bureau.
