= Grant District, Jackson County, West Virginia =

- Magisterial district
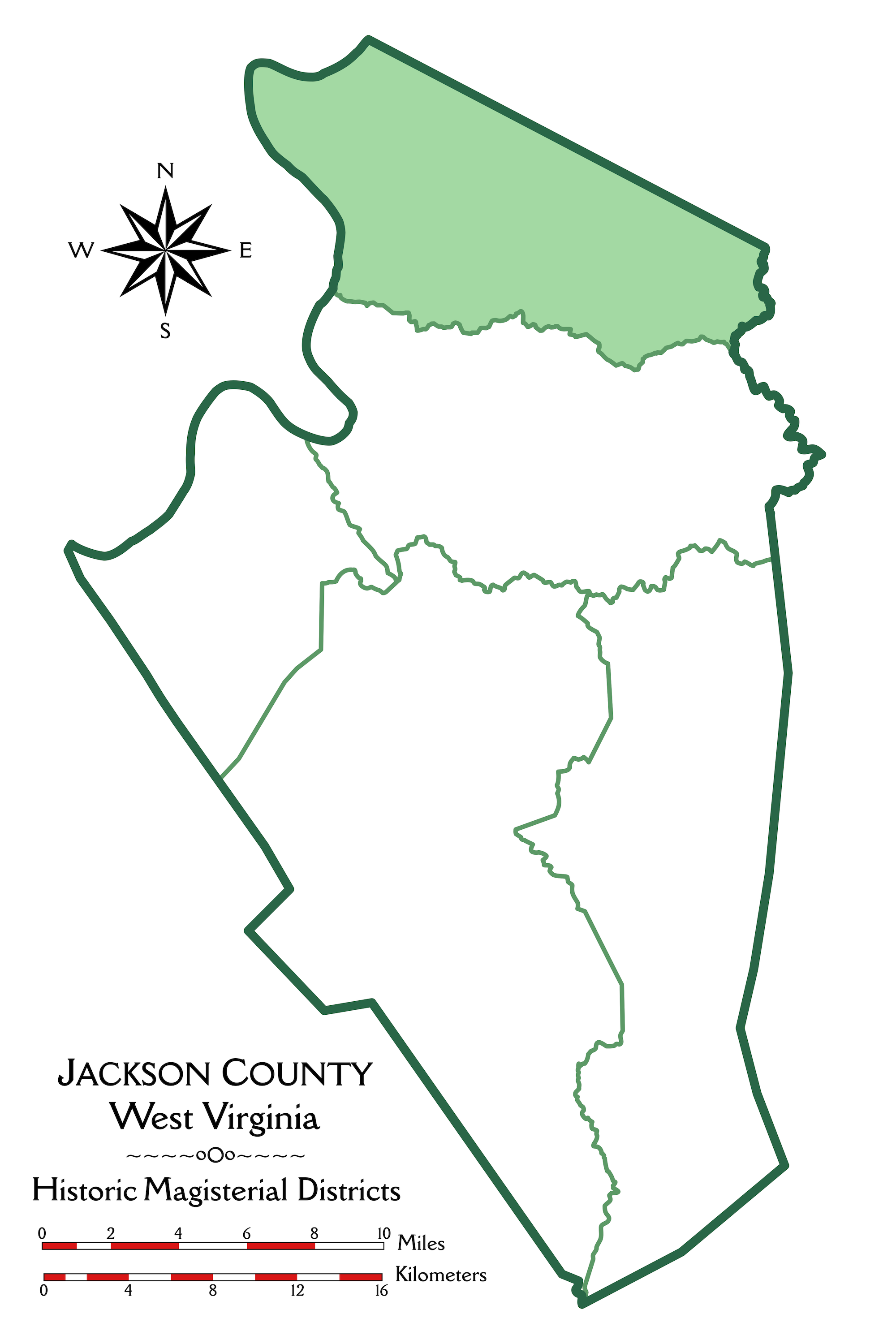
- Location of Grant District in Jackson County
- Coordinates: 39°01′28″N 81°40′56″W
- Country: United States
- State: West Virginia
- County: Jackson
- Established: 1863
- Named after: Ulysses S. Grant

Area
  - Total: 80.1 sq mi (207.5 km^{2})
  - Land: 77.7 sq mi (201.3 km^{2})
  - Water: 2.4 sq mi (6.2 km^{2})

Population (2010)
  - Total: N/A
- Time zone: UTC-5 (Eastern (EST))
  - Summer (DST): UTC-4 (EDT)

Grant District, formerly Grant Magisterial District, is one of five historic magisterial districts in Jackson County, West Virginia, United States. The district was originally established as a civil township in 1863, and converted into a magisterial district in 1872. When Jackson County was redistricted in the 1990s, the area of Grant District was included in the new Northern Magisterial District. However, the county's historic magisterial districts continue to exist in the form of tax districts, serving all of their former administrative functions except for the election of county officials.

== Geography ==
Grant District is the northernmost of Jackson County's historic magisterial districts. To the north, it is bounded by Wood County, to the east by Wirt County, to the south by Ravenswood District, and to the west by the Ohio River. In Wood County, it is bounded by Harris and Steele Districts; in Wirt County by the Southwest Magisterial District, formerly Tucker and Reedy Districts. Across the river in Ohio are Olive and Lebanon Townships in Meigs County.

Most of Grant District consists of rolling hills, with a fertile soil containing various mixtures of red, white, and blue clays, suitable for agriculture, orchards, and timber. The best agricultural soil is found in the bottomlands along the Ohio River, which runs along the western boundary of Grant District for eight miles. At Muses Bottom, the soil consists of a sandy loam with light clay. The district also includes Buffington Island, a large island in the Ohio River above Ravenswood.

=== Streams ===
The main streams in Grant District are Little Sandy Creek, which flows westward and empties into the Ohio River opposite Buffington Island; Little Pond Creek, which flows northward out of the center of the district, and enters Wood County; and the Left Fork of Sandy Creek, which drains the western part of the district, and flows southward, joining Nesselroad Run just south of the district line. Besides these, the Cabin Fork of Pond Creek, most of which is in Wood County, is in the northern part of the district; and several smaller creeks flow into the Ohio River, including Robison Run, Washington Run, Wheaton Run, and Skull Run.

Tributaries of Little Sandy Creek include Negro Run, the Meathouse Fork, Claylick Run, and Roadfork Run, all of which flow south and east out of the hills around Shafer Knob, before joining Little Sandy. Claylick divides into Right and Left Forks, while Hogtrail Run is a tributary of Roadfork. Little Pond Creek runs north of the same ridge that gives rise to the tributaries of Little Sandy. Its tributaries include the Bear Branch, Lamps Run, Jesse Run, and Bailey Run, all of which flow northwest into the main body of the creek, while Logston Run and Bee Run flow into Little Pond Creek from the northeast. Gunneltree Run is a tributary of Lamps Run, while Jesse Run divides into Right and Left Forks. Bailey Run flows into Wood County before joining Little Pond Creek, about half a mile above the junction of Little Pond Creek with the main branch of Pond Creek in Wood County. From there, Pond Creek flows westward through the hills until it reaches the Ohio at the village of Pond Creek, with its mouth straddling the county line.

Nesselroad Run flows southward from the hills along the Wood county line, and is joined by another Skull Run, Rush Run, another Bee Run, Maulecamp Run, Cherry Run, Buck Run, Redbush Run, Coon Run, which flows just south of the district line, and Parsons Run; Blood Run is a tributary of Redbush. The upper waters of the Left Fork of Sandy Creek reach all the way into Wirt and Wood Counties. Joining the Left Fork south of the Wirt County line is the Brushy Fork, which along with its tributary, Sandy Run, extend into Wirt County. The creek is then joined by the Lockhart Fork, flowing westward out of the hills forming the western boundary of Wirt County; its tributaries include Niggletwist Run and Kelball Run. The Left Fork is then joined by Harris Run, also called Farley Run, coming from the northwest, and finally by McGraw Run, flowing southward, about a mile above the mouth of Nesselroad Run.

=== Communities ===
There are no incorporated towns in Grant District, but there are many unincorporated communities. Located along the Ohio River, from north to south, are Lone Cedar and Neptune; Murraysville, on the point opposite Long Bottom, Ohio; Polk above Muses Bottom; Muses Bottom; Morgan below Muses Bottom; Skull Run and Portland Station below the mouth of Skull Run, and opposite Portland, Ohio; and Sherman, at the mouth of Little Sandy Creek. The former village of Brewster was just above Polk, while Runkle was between Muses Bottom and Morgan.

Other villages in Grant District include Utica on the Cabin Fork; Willowdale and Topins Grove on Little Pond Creek; and Low Gap, in the hills above Skull Run. The former village of Browning was above Willowdale on Little Pond Creek. In the far eastern portion of the district is the village of McClain, located atop Limestone Ridge, on the Wirt County line.

Along Little Sandy Creek and its tributaries are Cuba and Nesselroad, the latter located on the Meathouse Fork. The former village of Mozelle was on Roadfork Run. On the Left Fork of Big Sandy Creek are Wiseburg, near Shepherd Chapel, and Lockhart, formerly Buttermilk, below McGraw Run; and Medina, where Nesselroad Run joins with Maulecamp. The former village of Beatysville, was on the upper course of Nesselroad Run.

=== Roads and transportation ===
The main highway running through Grant District is West Virginia Route 68, which runs between Ravenswood and Parkersburg, and County Road 21, locally known as "Parkersburg Road", which runs between Ripley and Parkersburg. Interstate 77 runs through the district on its way from Charleston to Parkersburg, but the only exit in the district is at Medina.

A railroad runs along the Ohio River between Ravenswood and Parkersburg. Formerly part of the Baltimore and Ohio Railroad, the line is now part of CSX. There are no bridges over the Ohio in Grant District; but until the twentieth centuries there were several ferries: one between Murraysville and Long Bottom, Ohio; one from Brewster to Hazael, Ohio; and one from Skull Run to Portland, Ohio.

== History ==
Historical population
Census	Pop.	Note	%±
1870	2,031		—
1880	3,466		70.7%
1890	3,765		8.6%
1900	3,757		−0.2%
1910	3,276		−12.8%
1920	2,794		−14.7%
1930	2,130		−23.8%
1940	1,946		−8.6%
1950	1,250		−35.8%
1960	1,249		−0.1%
1970	1,215		−2.7%
1980	1,672		37.6%
1990	1,552		−7.2%
United States Census Bureau, U.S. Decennial Census, 1870–1990.

The first European settler in Grant District was John DeWitt, who settled at Muses Bottom in 1807. He was soon followed by John Boso, Thomas DeWitt, John Powers, Thomas Coleman, Elias Nesselroad, and others, who settled in the same vicinity. John Powers built a water-powered grist mill near the mouth of Topins Creek in 1809. The first settler child was Daniel Staats, son of Elijah Staats and Margaret Alkire, in 1813. A log schoolhouse was built at Muses Bottom in 1818. Frederick Amrine built the district's first sawmill in 1829.

Until 1831, the area of Jackson County was divided between Wood County, Mason County, and Kanawha County, West Virginia. All of Grant District lay within the boundaries of Wood County. With the establishment of the new county, the United States Post Office Department began appointing postmasters to handle the mail. Thomas Coleman was appointed postmaster at Muses Bottom in 1839.

On July 19, 1863, at the height of the Civil War, the Battle of Buffington Island took place on the western edge of the district. The action was part of Morgan's Raid, a Confederate cavalry incursion through Indiana and Ohio. Most of the battle took place along the Ohio shore, rather than on Buffington Island itself, but some skirmishing occurred there, as Confederate troops tried to cross the river into West Virginia; and as the most significant feature in the area, the island gave its name to the battle.

West Virginia had only been admitted to the Union as an independent state on June 20 of that year. Eleven days after the battle, on July 31, 1863, the West Virginia Legislature passed an act requiring the division of the counties into civil townships. Section five of the bill appointed George L. Kennedy, John Johnson, Robert R. Riley, Abraham Slaughter, and George Click to establish Jackson County's townships. Grant was one of the five original townships of Jackson County.

The original purpose of the townships was to provide for local government, as well as local control over revenue and the newly created system of free public schools. However, the rural nature of the state proved an impediment to participation in township government, and revenues fell far below expectations. In 1872, the townships were converted into magisterial districts, serving various administrative purposes, but having no governmental function.

Grant District was thickly forested at the time of its settlement. Hardesty's mentions "white oak, black oak, red oak, chestnut oak, hickory, [tulip] poplar, pine, beech and sugar [maple]" as the important timber. However, in the latter part of the century, Grant, along with the rest of Jackson County, was heavily logged for "lumber, staves, and railroad ties, many hundred thousand of the two latter being shipped annually." Trees along the river major streams were harvested first, with logging operations spreading from there to the interior. By 1883, the timber supply in all but the eastern part of Grant District had been exhausted.

The names and boundaries of Jackson County's magisterial districts remained relatively unchanged until the 1990s, when the county was redistricted in order to equalize the area and population of its magisterial districts as nearly as possible. All of Grant District and part of Ravenswood District were included in the new Northern Magisterial District. However, redistricting in a number of counties created confusion with land and tax records, so the legislature provided for the establishment of tax districts, following the lines of the historic magisterial districts, and serving all administrative functions other than the apportionment of county officials. As a result, Grant District remains an administrative unit of Jackson County, (Note: Because the magisterial districts were redrawn in order to equalize voter representation, the United States Census Bureau recognizes them as West Virginia's minor civil division, and thus no longer collects population statistics for Grant District.) although it is no longer one of the magisterial districts.
