= Sandy Creek (Ohio River tributary) =

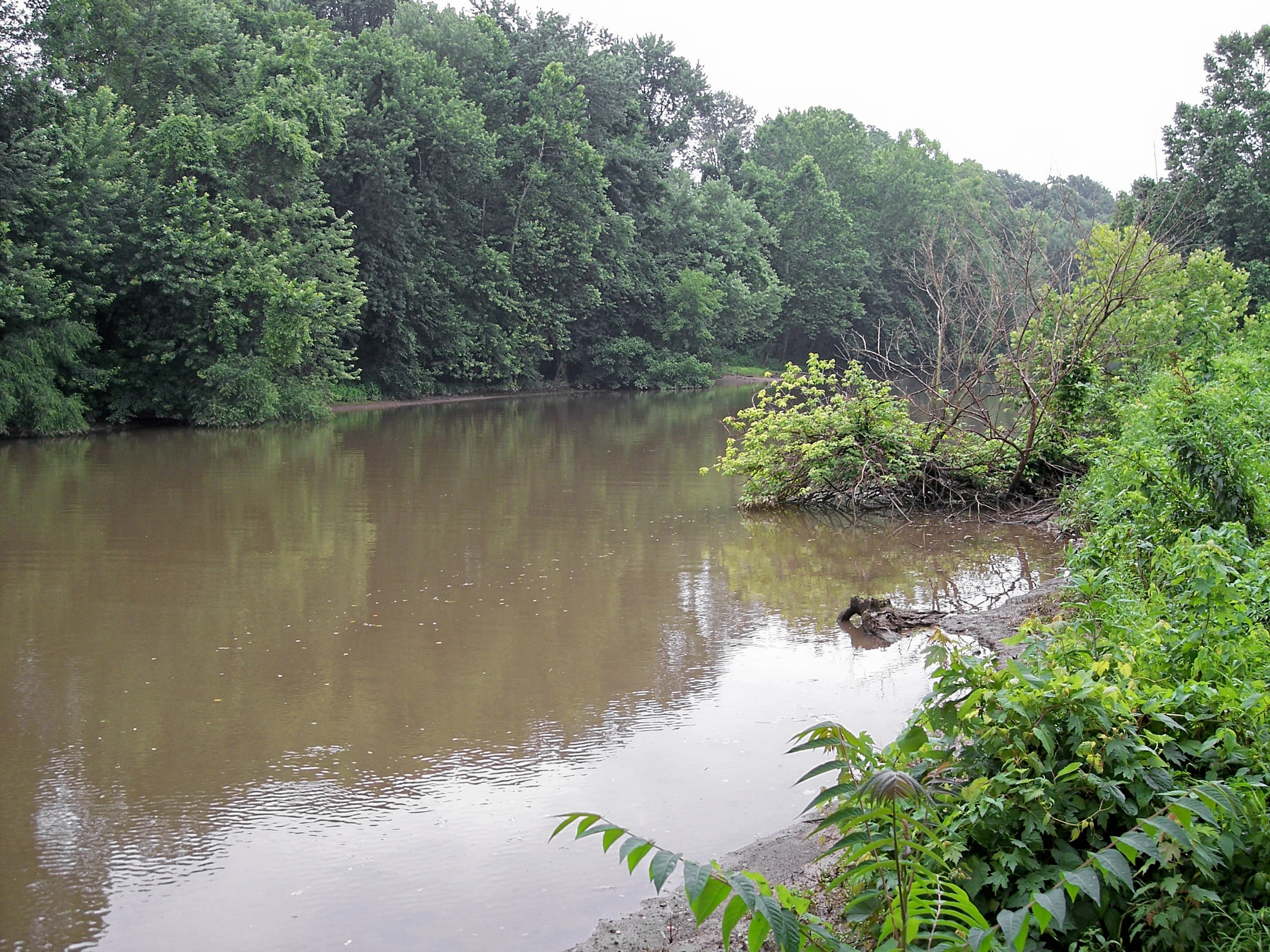
- Sandy Creek near its mouth in Ravenswood in 2006

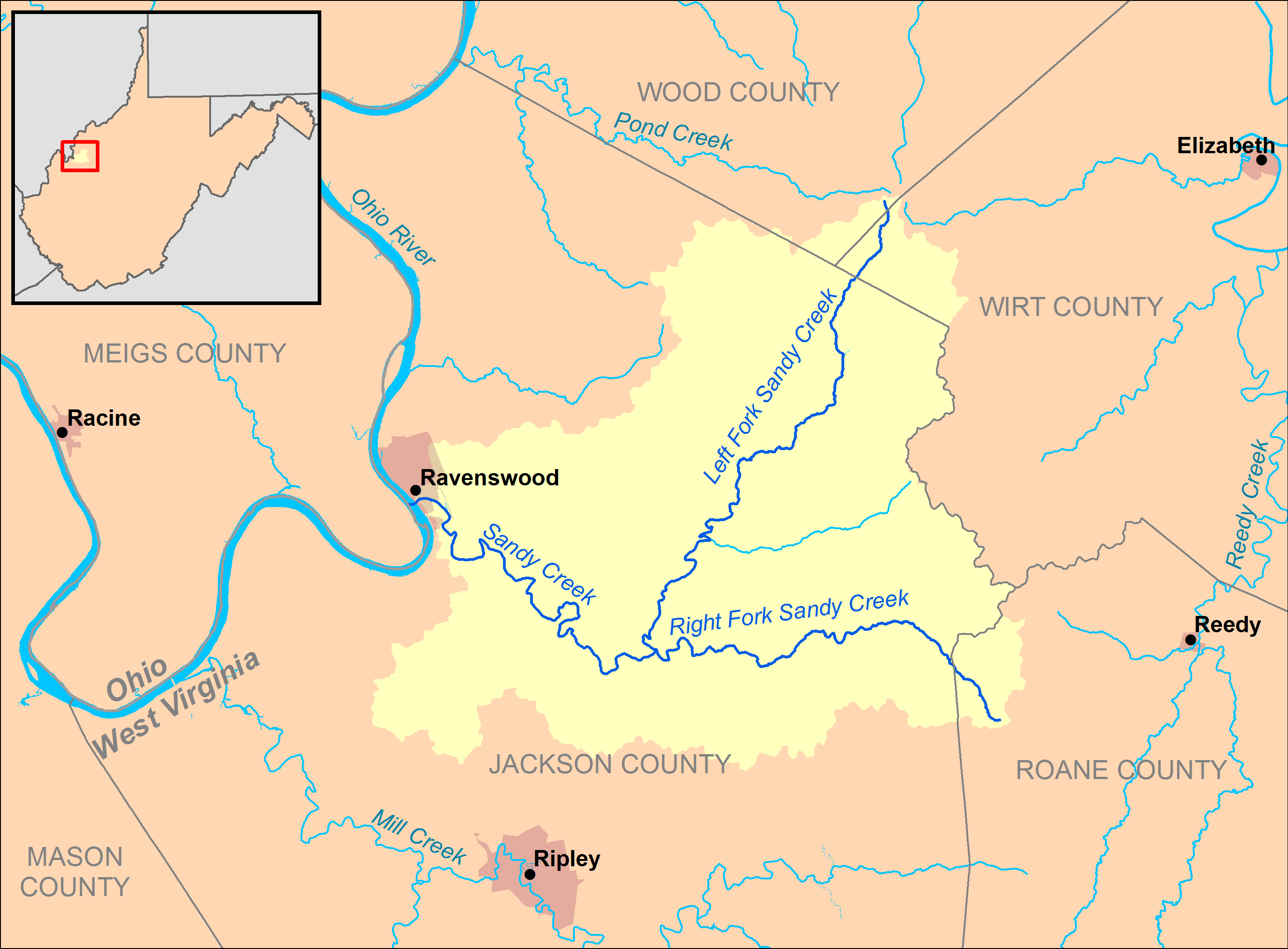
- Map of Sandy Creek and its watershed

Location
- Country: United States
- State: West Virginia
- County: Jackson

Physical characteristics
- Source: Left Fork Sandy Creek
  - location: South of Rockport, southeastern Wood County
  - coordinates: 39°02′54″N 81°33′37″W
  - length: 16.3 mi (26.2 km)
  - elevation: 1,014 ft (309 m)
- 2nd source: Right Fork Sandy Creek
  - location: northwestern Roane County
  - coordinates: 38°52′22″N 81°30′27″W
  - length: 11.7 mi (18.8 km)
  - elevation: 879 ft (268 m)
- Source confluence
  - location: South of Sandyville, northern Jackson County
  - coordinates: 38°53′46″N 81°39′28″W
  - elevation: 581 ft (177 m)
- Mouth: Ohio River
  - location: Ravenswood, West Virginia
  - coordinates: 38°56′43″N 81°45′42″W
  - elevation: 564 ft (172 m)
- Length: 22 mi (35 km)
- Basin size: 124 sq mi (320 km^{2})

Sandy Creek is a tributary of the Ohio River in western West Virginia in the United States. Via the Ohio River, it is part of the watershed of the Mississippi River, draining an area of 124 square miles (320 km^{2}) on the unglaciated portion of the Allegheny Plateau. The creek is 22 miles (35 km) long, or 38.3 miles (61.6 km) including its Left Fork.

Sandy Creek is formed in north-central Jackson County by the confluence of its left and right forks:

- The Left Fork Sandy Creek, 16.3 miles (26.2 km) long, rises south of the community of Rockport in extreme southeastern Wood County, and flows south-southwestward through the western extremity of Wirt County into Jackson County, through the communities of Wiseburg, Lockhart, Drift Run, Odaville, and Sandyville. The Left Fork is paralleled for most of its course by the former U.S. Route 21 (now a county highway).
- The Right Fork Sandy Creek, 11.7 miles (18.8 km) long, rises approximately 5 miles (8.0 km) west-southwest of Reedy in northwestern Roane County and flows generally westward into Jackson County, through the communities of Liverpool, LeRoy, Duncan, Meadowdale, and Jones Crossing.

From the confluence of the left and right forks south of Sandyville, Sandy Creek flows west-northwestward, through the community of Silverton to Ravenswood, where it flows into the Ohio River from the east.

According to the West Virginia Department of Environmental Protection, approximately 80% of the Sandy Creek watershed is forested, mostly deciduous. Approximately 19% is used for pasture and agriculture, and less than 1% is urban.

According to the Geographic Names Information System, it has also been known historically as Big Sandy Creek and as Buffalo Creek. A 1906 report of the West Virginia Department of Archives transcribes the name in an unspecified Native American language as Mol-chu-con-ic-kon.

== See also ==
- List of West Virginia rivers
