= Runkle =

Surname

Runkle is a surname. Notable people with the surname include:

- Benjamin Piatt Runkle, (1836–1916), founder of Sigma Chi fraternity, colonel in the Union Army during the American Civil War
- Bertha Runkle (1879–1958), American novelist and playwright; daughter of Lucia
- John Daniel Runkle (1822–1902), US educator and mathematician
- Lucia Runkle (1844–1922), American editorial writer; mother to Bertha
- Nathan Runkle (born 1984), American animal rights advocate
- Theadora Van Runkle (1929–2011), American costume designer

== See also ==
- Runkle, West Virginia, unincorporated community
