= Varner =

Varner can refer to:

== People ==
- Buck Varner (1930–2000), baseball player
- Elise Varner (1926-2021), American political hostess and activist
- Geoffry Varner (born 1987), American figure skater
- Harold Varner (disambiguation)
- Harold Varner III (born 1990), American golfer
- Harry Varner (1885–1970), American college football coach
- Jamie Varner (born 1984), mixed martial artist
- Jeff Varner (born 1966), American news anchor, reporter, and show contestant
- Margaret Varner Bloss (born 1927), American athlete and academic
- Martin Varner (1785–1844), American settler in Mexican Texas
- Nick Varner (born 1948), American pool player
- Robert Edward Varner (1921–2006), American federal judge
- Scott Varner (born 1962) American politician
- Tanner Varner (born 1984), American football player
- Tom Varner (born 1957), American jazz French horn player and composer
- Willie Varner (1926–2009), high school football coach

== Places and organizations ==
- Varner, Kansas
- Varner, West Virginia
- Varner-Gruppen, Norwegian textile retailer
- Varner–Hogg Plantation State Historical Site, home of former Governor of Texas James S. Hogg
- Bell-Varner House, historic home in Leitersburg, Maryland
- Varner's Station, former name for Smyrna, Georgia
- Wassamasaw Tribe of Varnertown Indians, a state-recognized tribe and 501(c)(3) organization in South Carolina
