= Ainārs Šlesers =

Latvian politician (born 1970)

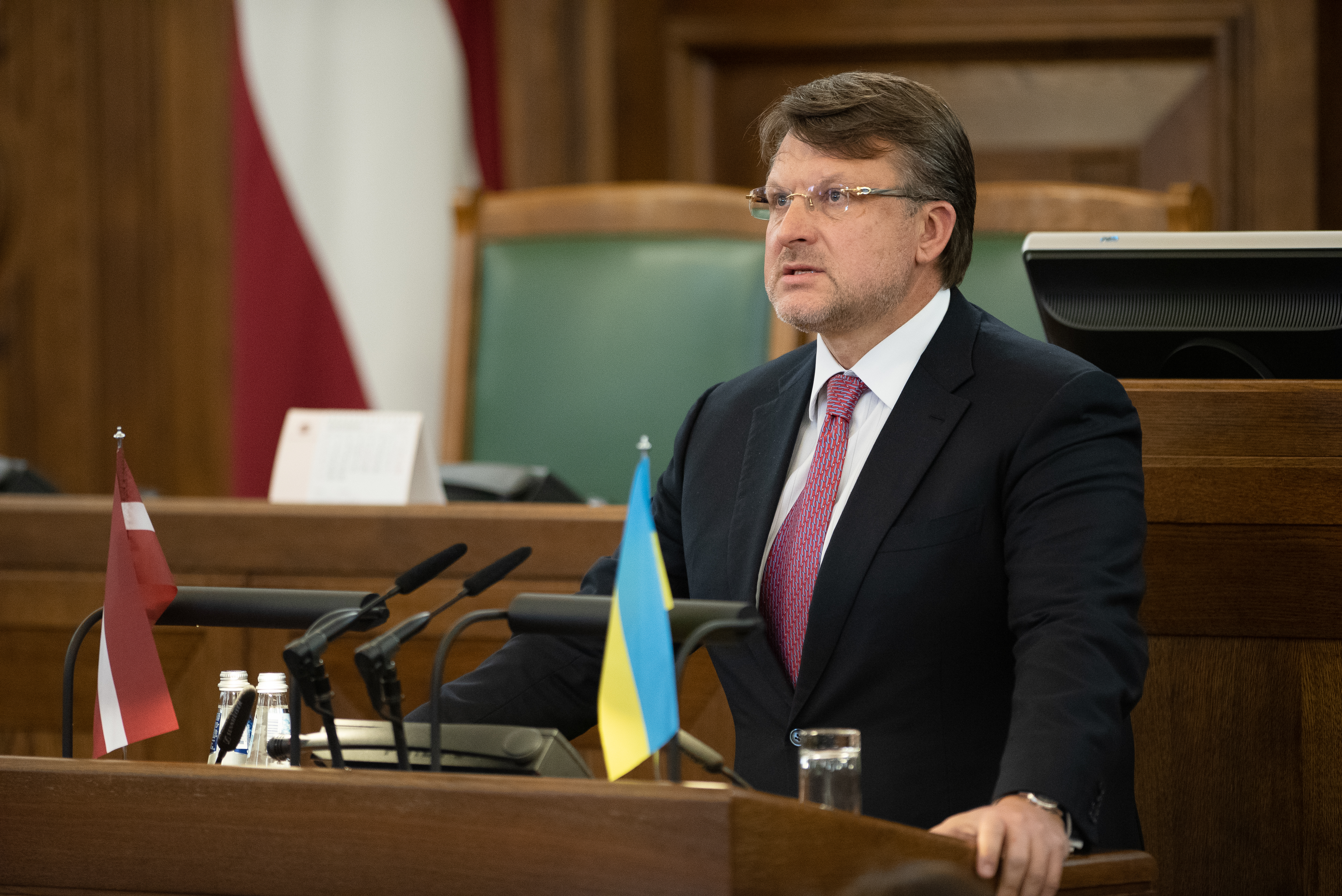
- Šlesers in 2022

Minister of Transport
- In office 7 November 2006 – 12 March 2009
- Prime Minister: Aigars Kalvītis; Ivars Godmanis
- Preceded by: Krišjānis Peters
- Succeeded by: Kaspars Gerhards
- In office 9 March 2004 – 17 March 2006
- Prime Minister: Indulis Emsis; Aigars Kalvītis
- Preceded by: Roberts Zīle
- Succeeded by: Krišjānis Peters

Ministry of Economics
- In office 26 November 1998 – 10 May 1999
- Prime Minister: Vilis Krištopans
- Preceded by: Laimonis Strujevičs
- Succeeded by: Ingrīda Ūdre

Member of the Saeima
- Incumbent
- Assumed office 3 November 2026
- In office 1 November 2022 – 10 June 2025
- In office 2 November 2010 – 17 October 2011
- In office 2 November 1998 – 16 July 2009

Personal details
- Born: Ainārs Leščinskis; 22 January 1970 (age 56) Riga, Latvian SSR
- Party: Latvia First (since 2021)
- Other political affiliations: JP (1998–2002); Latvia's First (2002–2007); LPP/LC (2007–2011); United for Latvia (2013–2016)
- Spouse: Inese Šlesere (m. 1992)
- Children: 5, including Edvards, Ričards

Ainārs Šlesers (born Ainārs Leščinskis, 22 January 1970) is a Latvian business oligarch and politician who was Deputy Prime Minister of Latvia, as well as Deputy Mayor of Riga. Currently he is a councillor in the Riga City Council and head of political party Latvia First. He is noted for his similarity to US President Donald Trump and involvement in disinformation campaigns.

His family business is closely related to the real estate and logistics sectors in Latvia. Riga Waterfront is a 3bn EUR project launched together with founder of Emaar Properties, Mohammed Alabbar, while Riga Port Group is the largest port company in Latvia, having the most modern coal and fertilizer terminals in Northern Europe, as well as offering stevedoring, container and railway services in the Baltics.

== Business career ==
Šlesers started his business in Norway, becoming president of the Latvian Information and Commerce Center in Norway in 1992. Through joint ventures together with Frank Varner and Stein Erik Hagen, he opened numerous shopping centres as well as real estate and commercial properties in Latvia. During 1994–1998 he was director general at Norwegian retail chain "Varner Baltija" and Director General of "Varner Hakon Invest", both ventures of Varner-Gruppen. He also was Chairman of the Board and President of JSC Supermarket "Centrs" (1995–1998) and Director General of Rimi Baltija, Ltd (1996–1997).

Through his joint ventures, he has been involved in developing Rimi Baltic, Narvesen, Cubus, Bik Bok, Dressmann store chains; major shopping malls in Riga – Galerija Centrs, Mols, Dole, Alfa, Minsk, Origo and Olympia; hotels Radisson Blu Ridzene and Radisson Blu Hotel Latvija, as well as large real estate developments – Saules akmens and Saliena.

Šlesers family are developers of Riga Waterfront, the 3 bn EUR project is the largest real estate project in Northern Europe and will house more than 30,000 people. The development will include 8,000 apartments, numerous hotels and offices, retail, public spaces and the new Ropax Terminal for ferries and passengers. The project was originally developed by Dutch architect Rem Koolhaas, but was completely redone with the involvement of Emaar in the project. The new Ropax Terminal was designed by Zaha Hadid Architects, and is expected to complete the connection between rail, plane and sea with the completion of Rail Baltica by 2035.

Šlesers family also own and manage Riga Port Group with former Prime Minister Andris Šķēle. Riga Port Group is the leading port company in Latvia, having the largest coal and fertilizer terminals in the Baltics. The logistics group also includes a stevedoring, container and a private railway company.

== Political career ==
He was the leader of the LPP/LC and a Parliament Deputy of the 7th, 8th, 9th and 10th Saeima. He was also the Minister of Economics in the cabinet of Vilis Krištopans (1998–1999), Deputy Prime Minister in the cabinet of Einars Repše and Indulis Emsis (2002-2004), Minister of Transport in the cabinet of Indulis Emsis, Aigars Kalvītis and Ivars Godmanis (2004-2009) and Deputy Mayor of Riga in 2009–2010.

=== Minister of Transport ===
Šlesers was Minister of Transport and Communications from 2004 to 2009, while also serving as Deputy Prime Minister in Indulis Emsis Government. During these years, he is credited for developing the Riga International Airport into a regional hub, increasing the number of passengers tenfold. The crucial step in the development of the airport was the agreement between Šlesers and Ryanair CEO Michael O'Leary about entering the Riga Airport in 2005. At the same time, the Latvian government-owned airline airBaltic had steadily become the largest airline in the Baltics. Due to its fast-paced growth, the Riga Airport was included in the EU railway development project, Rail Baltica. With total investments exceeding 5,8 billion Euros, the project will offer convenient connections to the Baltic Capitals and to Western Europe.

=== Deputy Riga Mayor ===
Šlesers took part in the Riga City Council elections in 2009 and received a majority of votes together with the Harmony Party and their leader Nils Ušakovs. Ušakovs became Mayor, while Šlesers became Deputy Mayor. Šlesers left office in 2010 after being elected in the parliament.

=== Latvia First ===
In July 2021, Šlesers announced his return to politics and that he would be founding a new political party. The "Latvia First" party was formally founded on 14 August. In the October 2022 election, Šlesers and his party received 9 out of 100 seats in the parliament, and Slesers was ranked the election's second most popular politician in the election according to voters' personal votes. In the parliament he was Chairman of the friendship groups between Latvia-China, as well as Latvia-United Arab Emirates.

Šlesers is a Donald Trump supporter, and advocates further developing closer pragmatic relationships with the US, China, and India based on trade and foreign investments.

== Personal life ==
He is married to Inese Šlesere, former politician, whose surname he adopted in 1992, with whom he has five children, including Ričards Šlesers.
