= Pond Creek (West Virginia) =

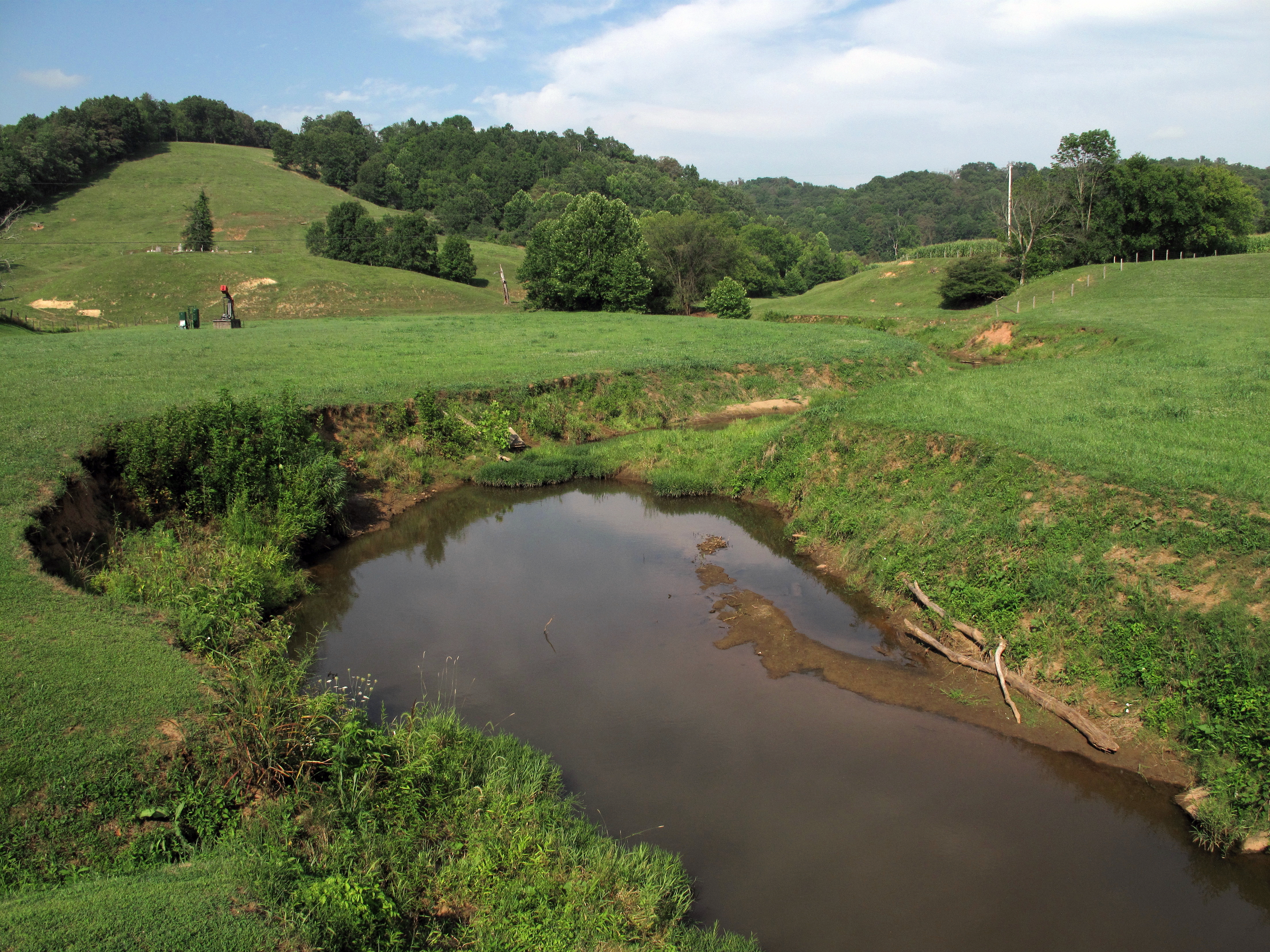
- Pond Creek northwest of Flinn in 2010

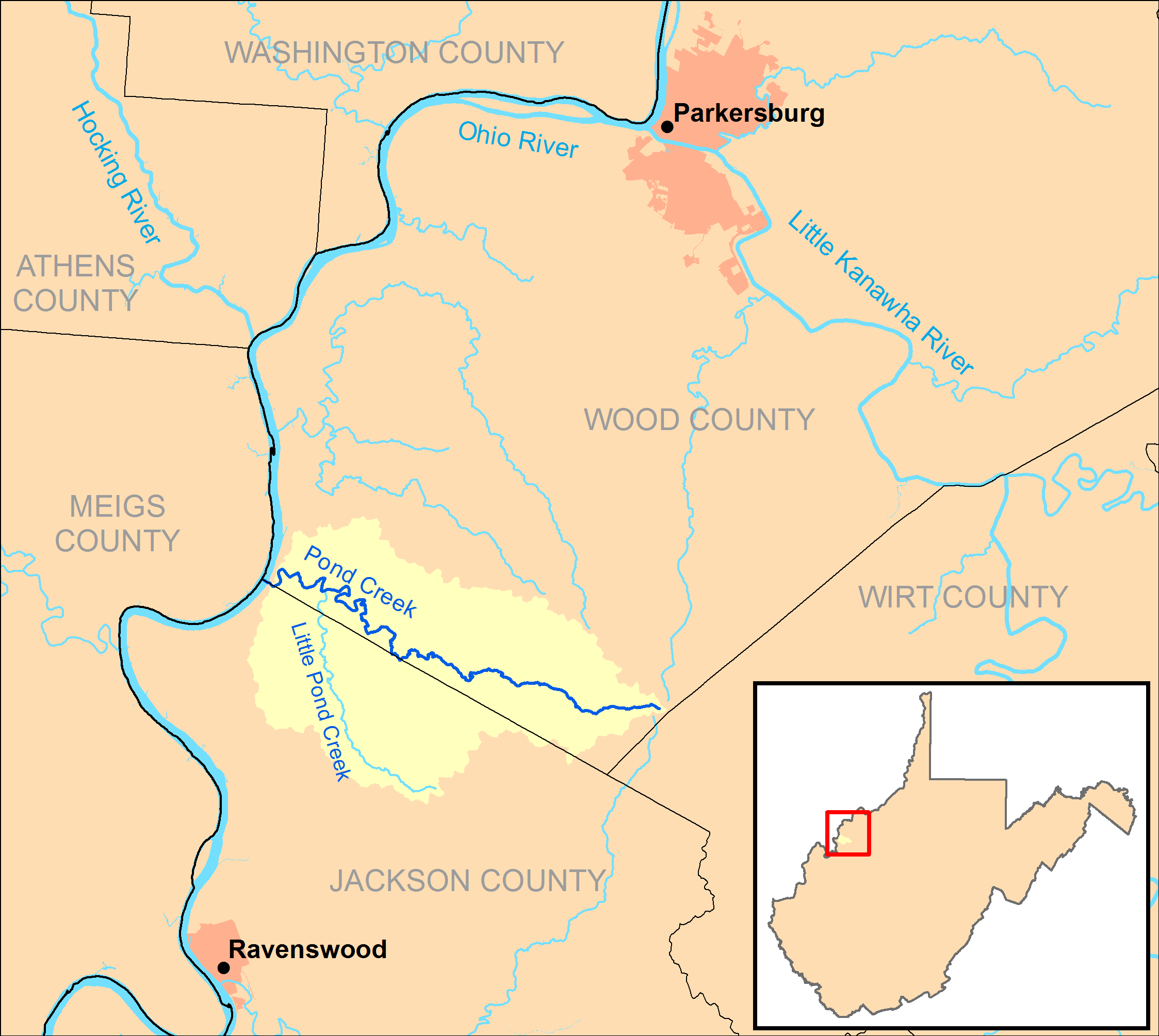
- Pond Creek and its watershed in Wood and Jackson counties, West Virginia

Location
- Country: United States
- State: West Virginia
- Counties: Wood, Jackson

Physical characteristics
- Source
  - location: south of Rockport
  - coordinates: 39.0506351°N 81.5562353°W
  - elevation: 978 ft (298 m)
- Mouth: Ohio River
  - location: Pond Creek
  - coordinates: 39.0939671°N 81.7440201°W
  - elevation: 561 ft (171 m)
- Length: 16 mi (26 km)
- Basin size: 43 sq mi (110 km^{2})

Pond Creek is a tributary of the Ohio River, 16 miles (26 km) long, in western West Virginia in the United States. Via the Ohio River, it is part of the watershed of the Mississippi River, draining an area of 43 square miles (110 km^{2}) on the unglaciated portion of the Allegheny Plateau.

Pond Creek flows for most of its length in southern Wood County; its watershed also drains a portion of northern Jackson County. It rises south of Rockport and flows generally west-northwestward through the unincorporated communities of Lowdell, Jerrys Run, and Flinn. East of Flinn and again near its mouth, the creek briefly enters Jackson County. It flows into the Ohio River on the boundary of Jackson and Wood counties, at the community of Pond Creek.

Downstream of Flinn it collects Little Pond Creek from the south. Little Pond Creek flows in Jackson County for most of its course, northwestward through the communities of Willowdale and Topins Grove.

According to the West Virginia Department of Environmental Protection, approximately 82% of the Pond Creek watershed is forested, mostly deciduous. Approximately 18% is used for pasture and agriculture.

== See also ==
- List of rivers of West Virginia
