= Browning, West Virginia =

Browning, West Virginia may refer to two unincorporated communities:

- Browning, Jackson County, West Virginia
- Browning, Summers County, West Virginia
