= André Castaigne =

French painter (1861–1929)

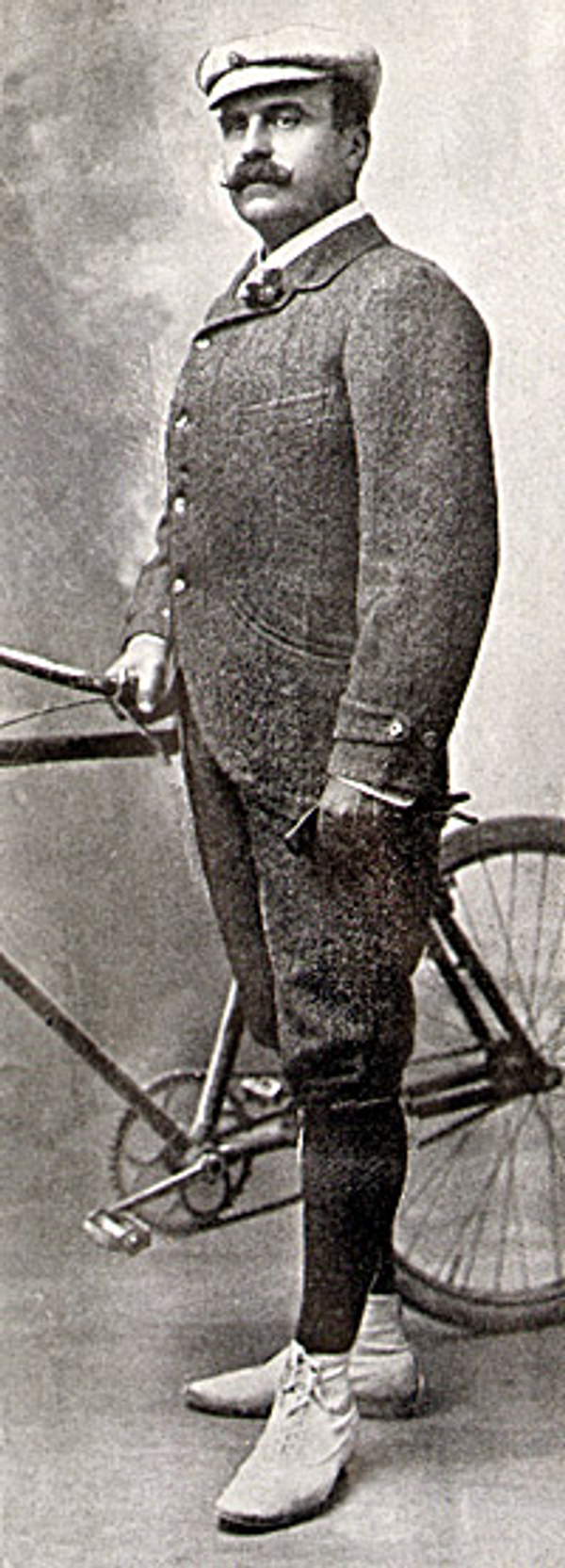
Castaigne ca. 1902

Jean Alexandre Michel André Castaigne (French pronunciation: [ʒɑ̃ alɛksɑ̃dʁ miʃɛl ɑ̃dʁe kastɛɲ]; 7 January 1861, in Angoulême, Charente – 1929, in Angoulême) was a French artist and engraver, a student of Jean-Léon Gérôme and Alexandre Cabanel. Subsequently he became a leading illustrator in the United States. He is often recalled as the original illustrator of the first edition of The Phantom of the Opera.

Castaigne also created more than 36 art pieces about Alexander the Great for an 1898–99 series. As an illustrator, he captured images of the first modern olympics; he drew pictures of the 1896 Olympic Games for Scribner's Magazine.

== Biography ==
André Castaigne was the son of Jean Eusèbe Joseph Castaigne (1828–1902), himself a painter, and Mathilde Debouchaud. His brother Joseph Jean Destrains Castaigne (1859–1923) was a poet. In 1878, he began his studies at what was then the Académie Suisse. After a few months he transferred to the Académie des Beaux-Arts where his two mentors taught. He was in Cabanel's studio for a year before moving to Gérôme's studio where he won first place in the General Competition three times–for nude figure painting, composition, and general excellence. His work was selected for the Prix de Rome on three occasions and, although he never won, it was a compliment as only ten paintings were selected for the competition.

=== Early career ===
He had his first exhibition in Paris in 1884, from whence his painting Dante et Béatrice went on tour to New Orleans where it received a great deal of attention. In 1887 he exhibited the huge painting, five yards by four, The Deluge, which later was placed in the municipal gallery of his native city Angoulême. In 1888, he painted a portrait of the Vicomte de Dampierre in his hunting jacket and in 1889 he created a painting titled After the Combat, which later was acquired by the Peabody Gallery in Baltimore.

=== American career ===
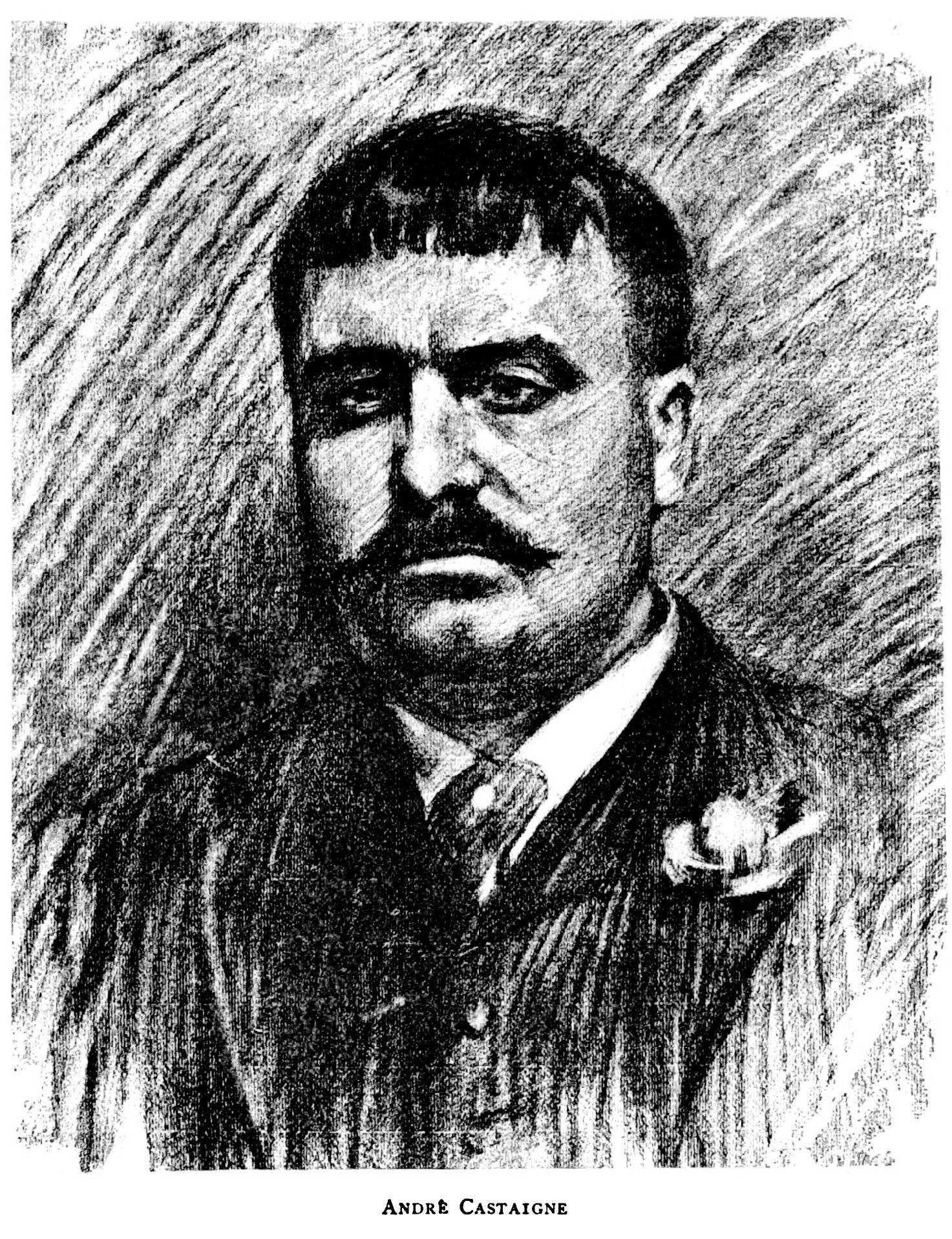
Castaigne in 1893 by an anonymous member of the Charcoal Club of Baltimore

Castaigne spent six months in England, then went to the United States in 1890 and remained until 1895. He became director of an art school in Baltimore called the Charcoal Club and under his direction the school, which had been in decline, flourished and became one of the best art schools in the region. He painted several notable portraits the first year he was in America. In 1891, he began the illustrating work by which he is best known to the American public. His first work of this type was The Forty-Niners' Ball in the Century Magazine for May 1891, followed by The Bowery in December of the same year. These images of the West earned him immediate recognition as a master of a very American art form. After that he illustrated for several of the leading magazines. His designs included pictures of Texas cowboys in Scribner's Magazine—On the Great Cattle Trail (1892), part of a series titled Cattle Trails of the Prairies and the World's Fair drawings and illustrations for 'Polly' in the Century Magazine. In 1893, he painted eight illustrations for an article by A.C. Fletcher on the Omaha tribe in The Century. He illustrated B.I. Wheeler's Life of Alexander the Great (1900), for which he did over 36 paintings and drawings from November 1898 to October 1899. His work for Century Magazine included travelling extensively, visiting Corsica (1894), Italy (1895, 1896), Greece (1897) and the Rhineland (1898) to illustrate travel articles by Augustine Birrell. For The Century he did over 160 illustrations. He also worked for Harper's Magazine from 1901 to 1913. He was official painter for the Olympic Games in 1896.

=== Return to France ===
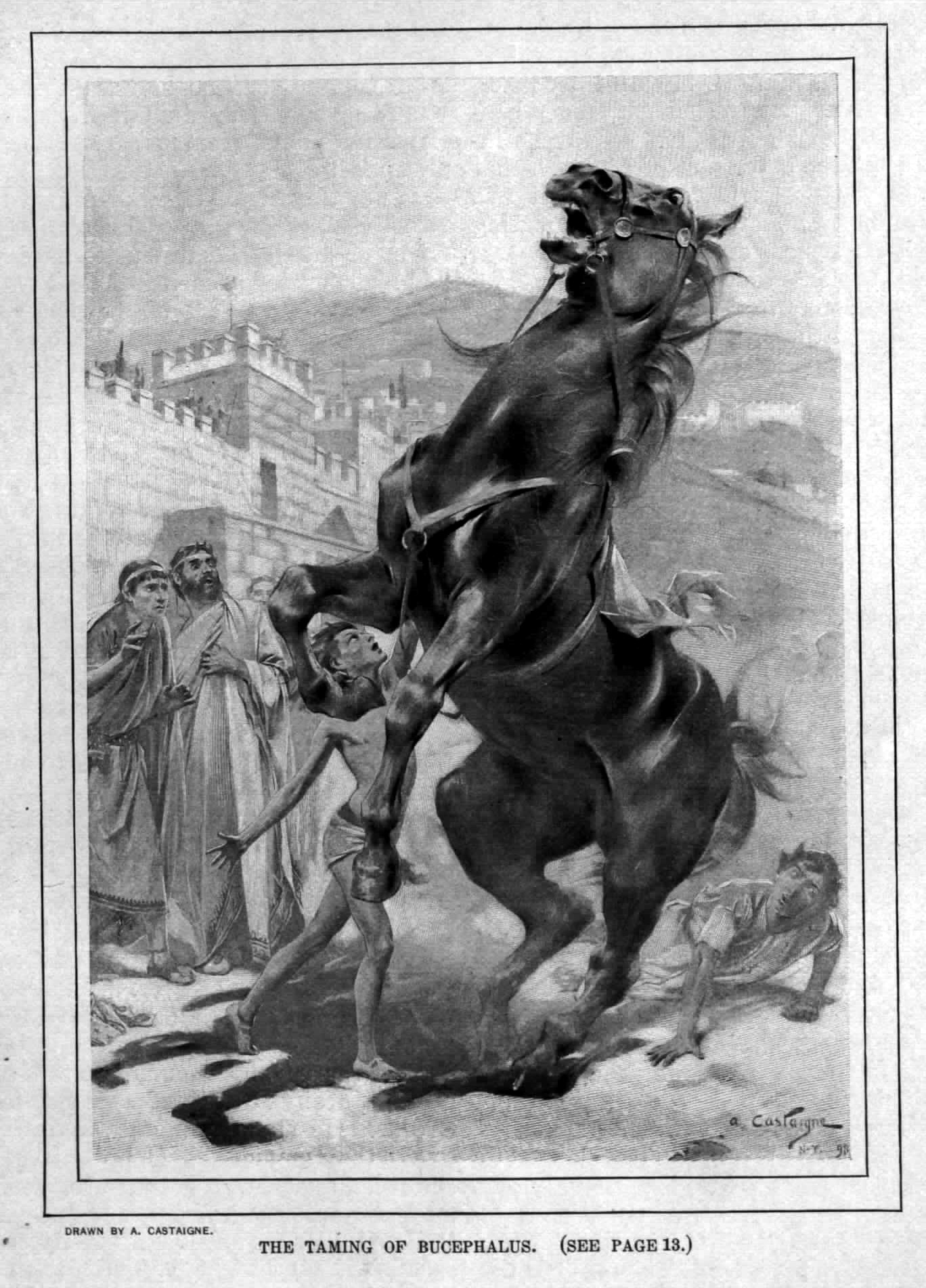
The taming of Bucephalus—one of Castaigne's pieces on Alexander the Great (1898–99)

On his return to France in 1895, he became instructor in the Académie Colarossi and opened a studio in Paris. He remained permanent European correspondent for The Century and made trips to the US from time to time to do American illustrations for the magazine. These include Mammouth Cave (1898) and Niagara Falls (1899) He also visited Canada at this time and produced Canadian Rapids from the Island. Little by little, photogravure replaced engraving and lithography and Castaigne no longer did travel pictures after around 1910. In France, he published Fata Morgana (1904), a novel dealing with the art life of Paris and illustrated by himself. During a six-year period in France where he divided his time between a winter studio in Paris and a summer studio in Angoulême, he illustrated William Milligan Sloane's The Life of Napoleon Bonaparte, Richard Whiteing's Paris of To-Day and Bertha Runkle's The Helmet of Navarre.

While in France, Castaigne was principal draughtsman to the President of France Félix Faure who awarded him the Red Ribbon of the Legion of Honour.

He died unmarried in 1929 at the Clinique St. Marthe in Angoulême where he had been admitted with a hernia. Due to complications as a result of not obeying medical orders and getting out of bed, this proved fatal.
