= Independence, Jackson County, West Virginia =

- Unincorporated community
- Location within West Virginia Location within the United States
- Coordinates: 38°54′25″N 81°40′30″W
- Country: United States
- State: West Virginia
- County: Jackson
- Time zone: UTC-5 (Eastern (EST))
  - Summer (DST): UTC-4 (EDT)
- GNIS ID: 1554765

Independence is an unincorporated community in Jackson County, West Virginia, United States. It is located on County Route 33/12 between the communities of Crow Summit and New Era. Independence is home to a military veterans memorial located at the Independence Cemetery.
