= Lowdell =

Lowdell may refer to:

- Lowdell, West Virginia, an unincorporated community in Wood County, West Virginia, United States
- Arthur Lowdell, a former English footballer
