= Dressmann =

Norwegian men's clothing store chain

Dressmann AS
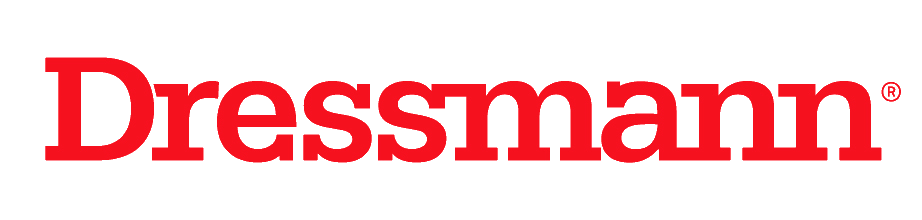
- The official logo of Dressmann.
- Company type: Subsidiary of Varner AS
- Industry: Retail (Clothing)
- Founded: 1967; 59 years ago (brand); January 14, 1988 (incorporation)
- Founder: Frank Varner
- Headquarters: Nesøyveien 4, Billingstad, Asker, Norway
- Number of locations: ~430–480 stores (total)
- Area served: Northern Europe
- Key people: Petter Varner (CEO); Stein Marius Varner (Board Chair)
- Products: Menswear, suits, accessories
- Revenue: ▲NOK 11.4 billion (Varner Group, 2024)
- Number of employees: ~3,500 (Dressmann specific); 9,106 (Varner Group, 2024)
- Parent: Varner AS
- Website: www.dressmann.com

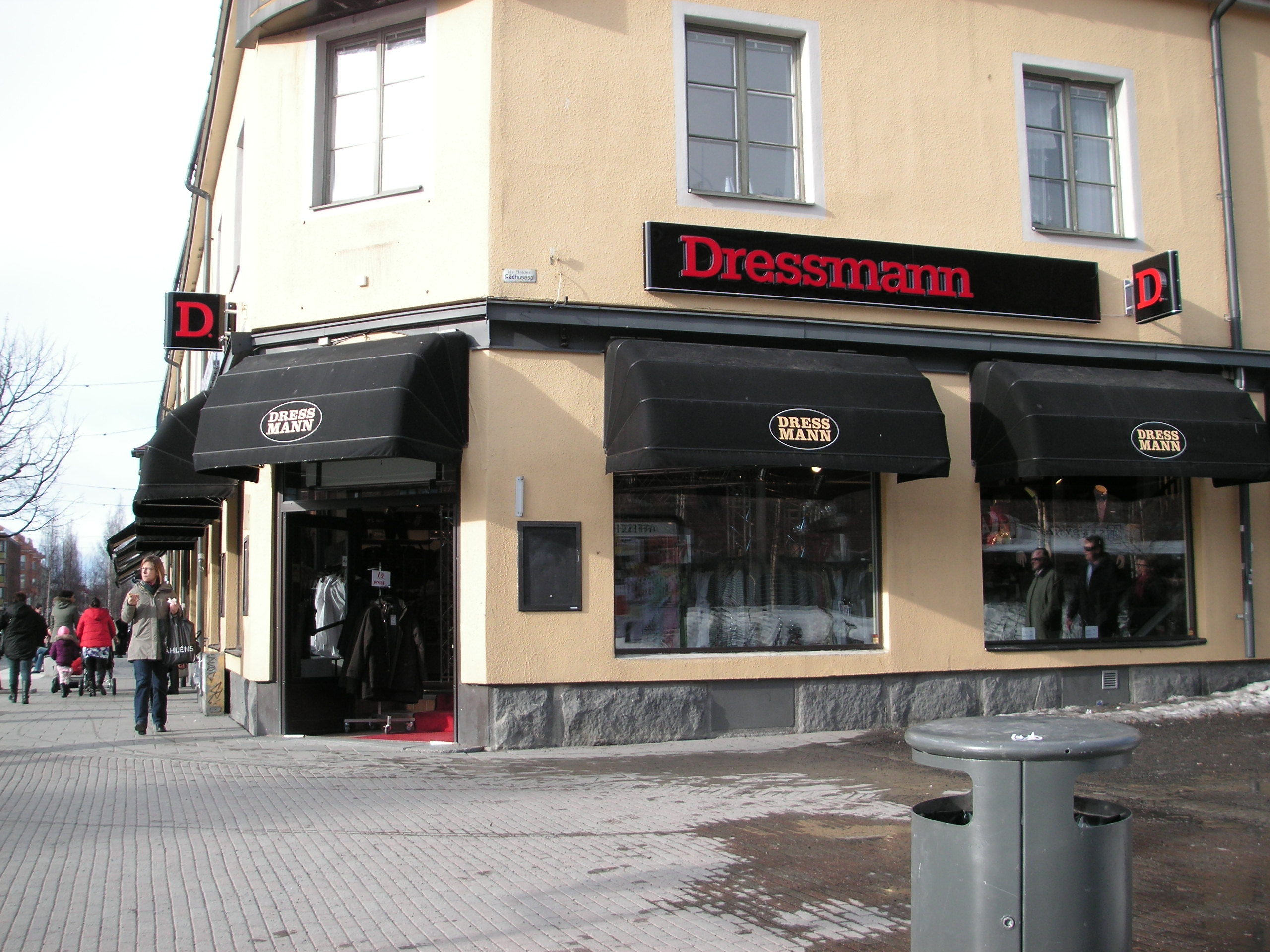
Dressmann store in Umeå, Sweden.

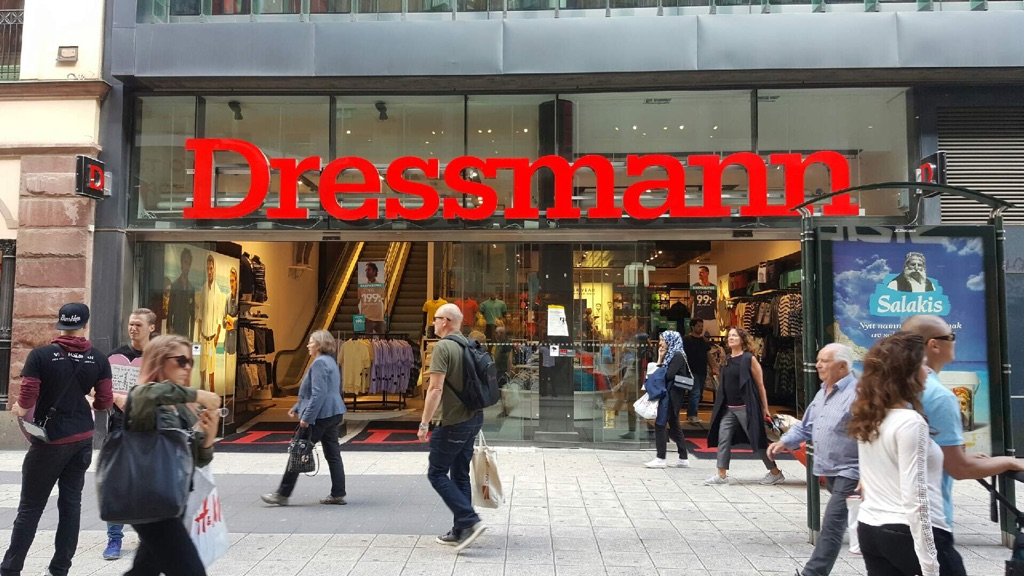
Dressmann in Stockholm.

Dressmann is a chain of men's clothing stores owned by Varner-Gruppen. It was founded in Norway by Frank Varner, who opened the first store in Oslo in 1967. In addition to Norway, Dressmann stores can now be found in Sweden, Finland, Germany, Latvia (to 2014), Iceland and Denmark. In 2013 the number of stores had grown to 400. In 2010 it started a one-year collaboration with the rock band The Rolling Stones. Dressmann got the rights to use old classical songs in advertisement as well as artwork created by the Rolling Stones.

Dressmann is now the leading chain of men's clothing stores in Northern Europe.

== Insolvency in Austria ==
Dressmann Austria filed for insolvency on May 18th, 2020. Around 50 creditors with total claims of 14.2 million euros were affected by the insolvency proceedings. The last Dressmann store in Austria closed on 31st of August, followed by sale that saw products' prices reduced to up to 50%.
