= Lucia Runkle =

American magazine contributor

Lucia Isabella Runkle
- Born: Lucia Gilbert; August 20, 1844; North Brookfield, Massachusetts
- Died: March 1923 (aged 78)
- Other name: Lucia Gilbert Runkle
- Occupation: Magazine contributor
- Spouse: Cornelius Runkle
- Children: Bertha Runkle

Lucia Isabella Runkle (née Gilbert; August 20, 1844 – March 1923), was an editorial writer and contributor to the New York Tribune and Harper's. She was one of the first women editorialists at a major American newspaper.

== Biography ==
Runkle was born in North Brookfield, Massachusetts and educated in Fall River and Worcester, Massachusetts. She moved to New York City and for many years she was an editorial writer and contributor to the New-York Tribune, in which she published a series of articles on cooking, treated from an artistic standpoint. She also wrote frequently for other journals and for magazines including the Christian Union, later The Outlook. For ten years, Runkle was the literary adviser of Harper & Brothers, her work including French and German manuscripts and books, as well as English. In 1893, she undertook, with Charles Dudley Warner and others, the enormous labor which is represented in the thirty volumes of Library of the World's Best Literature.

She was quoted in support of The Woman's Advocate publication. She corresponded with Helen Hunt Jackson.

== Personal life ==
In the early 1860s, she had an affair with future president James Garfield, who ended the affair after his wife learned of it.

In 1862, she married a Mr. Calhoun. Her second marriage, in 1869, was to Cornelius Runkle, a customs official and lawyer for the New-York Tribune. Their daughter Bertha Runkle authored The Helmet of Navarre and four other novels. In March 1923, she died on board the US Army transport USS U.S. Grant en route from Panama to California and was buried at sea.

== Selected works ==
- Modern Women and What is Said of Them: A Reprint of a Series of Articles in the Saturday Review, by E. Lynn Linton, J. S. Redfield, New York (1868), contributor
- Library of the world's best literature, ancient and modern, New York, R. S. Peale and J. A. Hill, (c1896-97), contributor
