= Pond Creek, West Virginia =

Pond Creek
- Unincorporated community
- Location within the state of West Virginia Pond Creek (the United States)
- Coordinates: 39°5′39″N 81°44′35″W
- Country: United States
- State: West Virginia
- County: Wood
- Elevation: 604 ft (184 m)
- Time zone: UTC-5 (Eastern (EST))
  - Summer (DST): UTC-4 (EDT)
- GNIS feature ID: 1549881

Pond Creek is an unincorporated community located in Wood County, West Virginia, United States, situated along the Ohio River at the mouth of Pond Creek.
