= Inese Šlesere =

Latvian politician and model

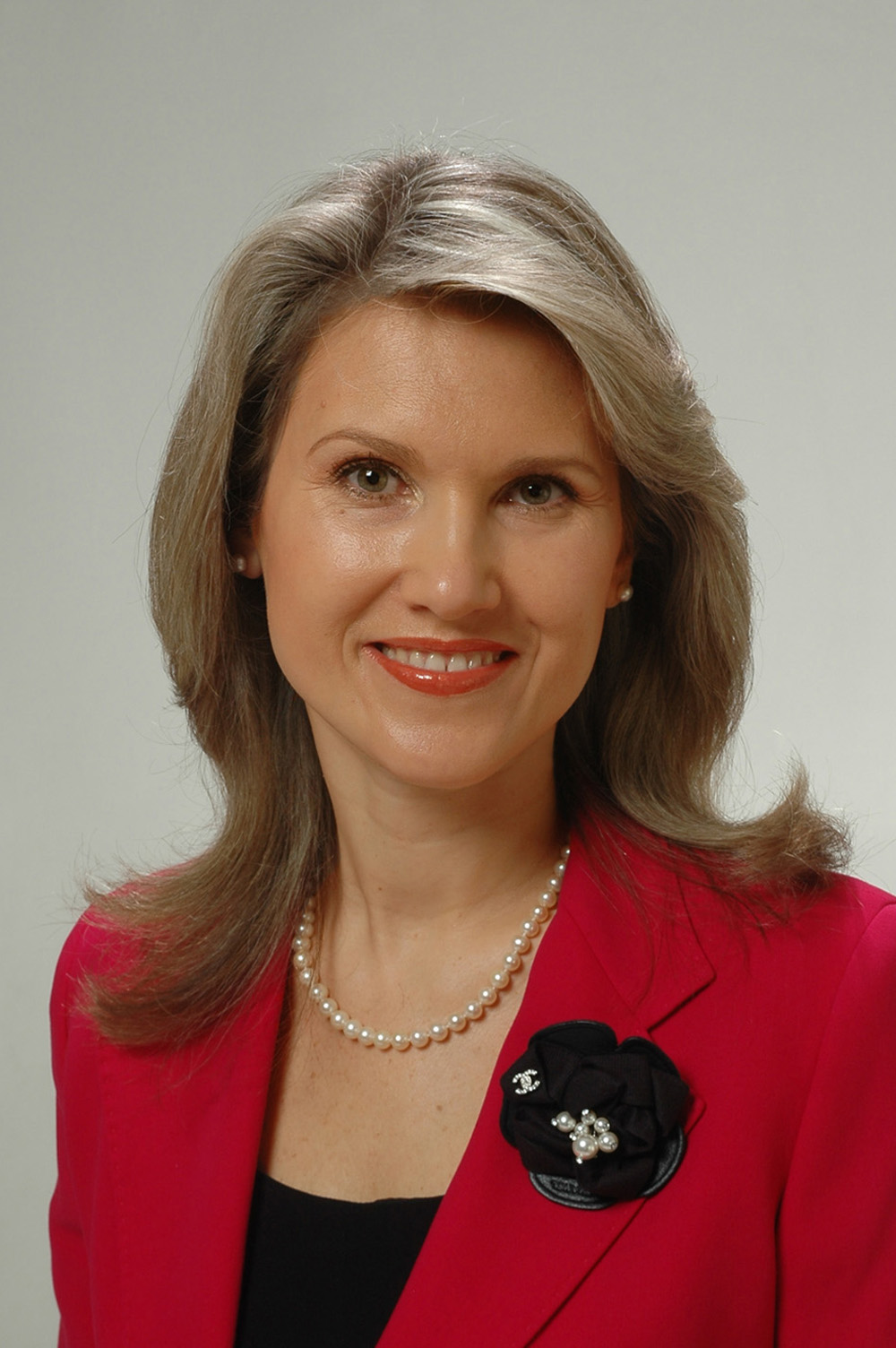

Member of the Saeima
- In office March 13, 2008 – November 2, 2010
- In office November 5, 2002 – November 16, 2006

Personal details
- Born: August 2, 1972 (age 54) Riga, Latvian SSR, Soviet Union
- Party: LPP/LC (since 2007)
- Other political affiliations: LPP (2002–2007)
- Spouse: Ainārs Šlesers
- Children: 5, including Ričards
- Education: University of Latvia

Inese Šlesere (born 2 August 1972 in Riga) is a Latvian politician, former model and beauty pageant titleholder. She was the runner-up in the 1999 Mrs. World and a contestant in Miss World 1991. She was a member of the Latvian Parliament from 2002 to 2011. Since 2010, she is the main organizer of the annual Latvian Prayers breakfast. She is married to Ainārs Šlesers and has five children, including Ričards Šlesers.
