= Ričards Šlesers =

Latvian politician (born 1997)

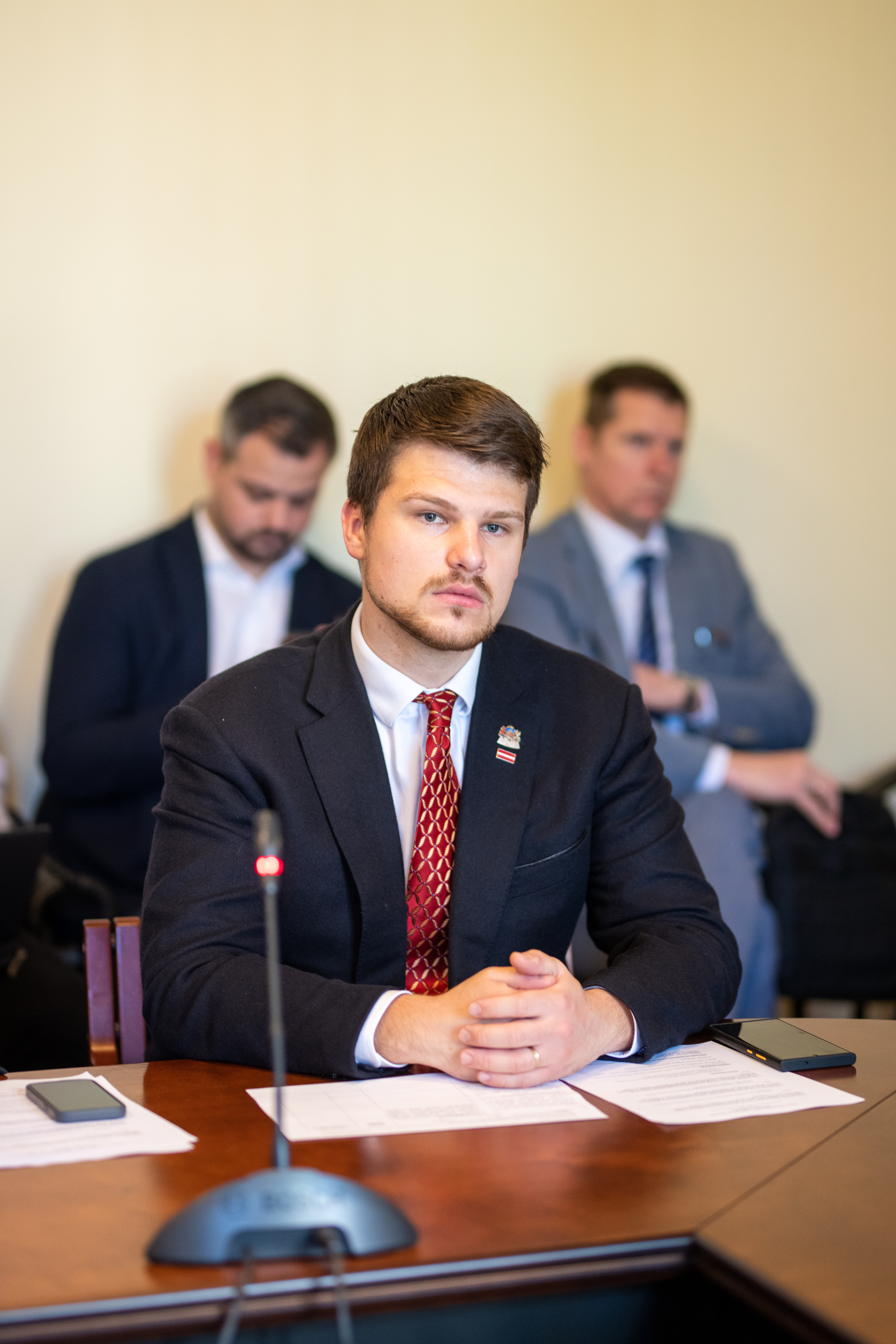
- Šlesers in 2023

Member of the Saeima
- In office 1 November 2022 – 3 November 2026
- Constituency: Livonia

Personal details
- Born: 20 February 1997 (age 29)
- Party: Latvia First
- Parents: Ainārs Šlesers (father); Inese Šlesere (mother)
- Education: Birmingham City University

Ričards Šlesers (born 20 February 1997) is a Latvian politician and former film industry professional who has served as a member of the Saeima since 2022.

Before entering politics, he worked in film production and studied Film Technology and Visual Effects in the United Kingdom, where he obtained a Bachelor of Science degree. He has worked on film productions in Ireland and South Africa. Šlesers was elected to parliament from the Latvia First party list in the 2022 Latvian parliamentary election. His stated political interests include youth policy, demographic issues, and the development of Latvia's film industry.
