= Jerrys Run, West Virginia =

Jerrys Run
- Unincorporated community
- Location within the state of West Virginia Jerrys Run (the United States)
- Coordinates: 39°4′1″N 81°39′33″W
- Country: United States
- State: West Virginia
- County: Wood
- Elevation: 617 ft (188 m)
- Time zone: UTC-5 (Eastern (EST))
  - Summer (DST): UTC-4 (EDT)
- GNIS ID: 1549760

Jerrys Run is an unincorporated community in Wood County, West Virginia, United States, located along Pond Creek.
