= Nesselroad, West Virginia =

- Unincorporated community
- Location within West Virginia Location within the United States
- Coordinates: 38°59′30″N 81°42′14″W
- Country: United States
- State: West Virginia
- County: Jackson
- Elevation: 650 ft (200 m)
- Time zone: UTC-5 (Eastern (EST))
  - Summer (DST): UTC-4 (EDT)
- Area codes: 304 & 681
- GNIS feature ID: 1549537

Nesselroad is an unincorporated community in Jackson County, West Virginia, United States. Nesselroad is located on County Highway 10/4, 4.3 miles (6.9 km) northeast of Ravenswood. Nesselroad once had a post office, which is now closed.

An early postmaster named Nesselroad gave the community his name.
