= The Helmet of Navarre =

Novel by Bertha Runkle

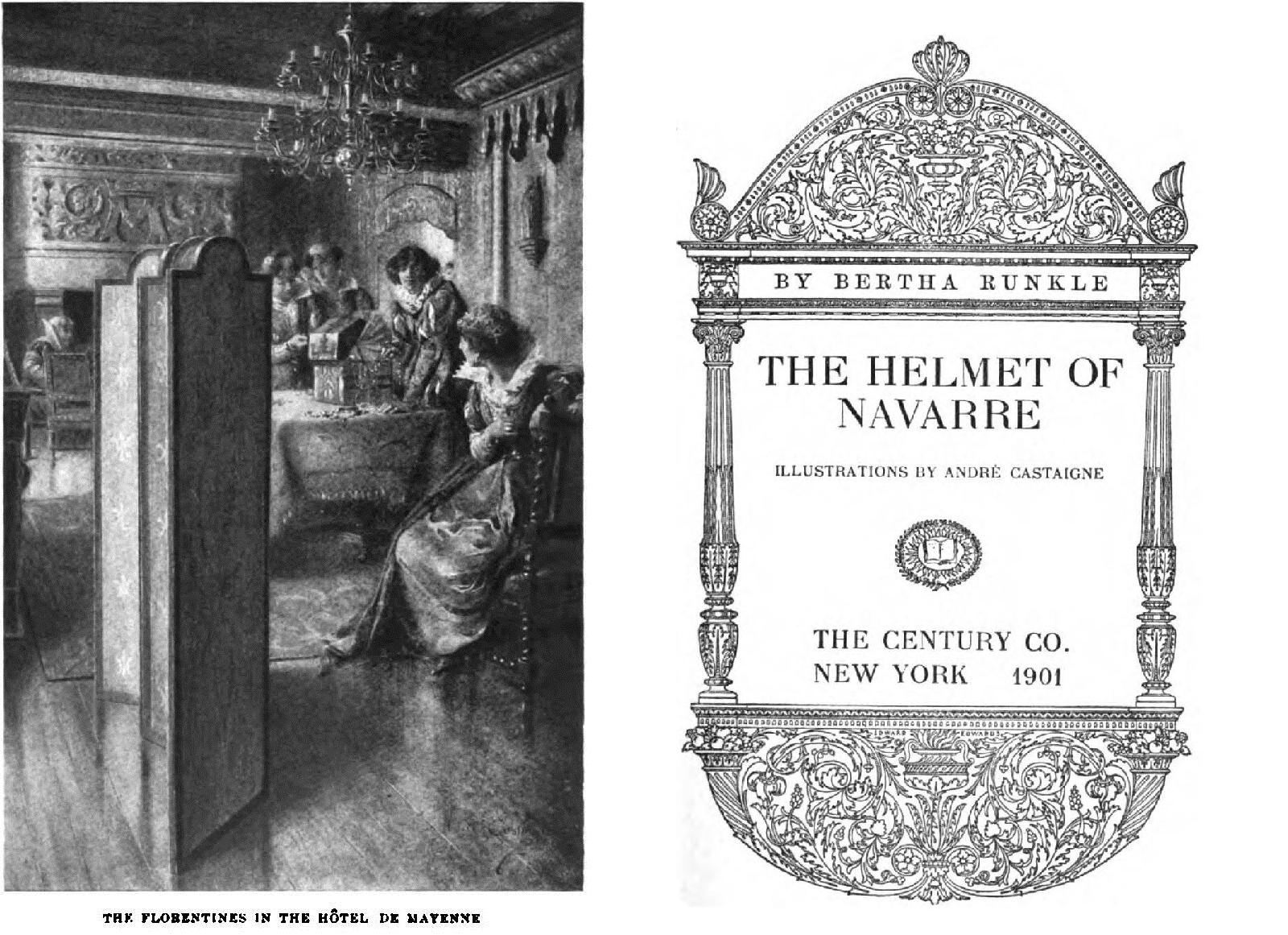
- Frontispiece and title page
- Author: Bertha Runkle
- Illustrator: André Castaigne
- Language: English
- Subject: Henry IV of France 1553-1610
- Genre: Historical novel, Fiction
- Publisher: The Century Co.
- Publication date: 1901
- Publication place: United States
- Media type: Print (hardcover)
- Pages: 470 pp
- OCLC: 892379
- LC Class: PZ3.R875 H PS3535.U453

The Helmet of Navarre is a historical novel by American writer Bertha Runkle published in 1901. It first appeared in serial form in the magazine The Century Magazine in 1900. Later, she adapted the novel for the stage.

== Publication history ==
The New York Times made the following announcement on July 14, 1900,

"A young romantic novelist, Miss Bertha Runkle, of New York City, will make her debut in the August Issue of The Century Magazine with the first chapters of a novel which will run through eight numbers of the periodical. The work is described as a dramatic romance of love and adventure, and is entitled "The Helmet of Navarre". The scene of the tale is laid in Paris during the siege by Henry of Navarre, and the action occupies the four days preceding the Sunday when Henry entered the city to accept the Roman Catholic faith. Miss Runkle is the daughter of Mrs. L.G. Runkle, a woman well known in New York literary circles."

Runkle was only twenty-one when the book appeared in the Century Magazine. She had the story in her mind for two years or so, and the actual writing took about four months. The title was taken from a passage in Thomas Babbington Macaulay's poem Ivry, which its author adopted as a motto:

"Press where ye see my white plume shine amidst the ranks of war,

"And be your oriflamme today, the helmet of Navarre."

The book went on to become No. 3 on the list of bestselling novels in the United States for the entire year of 1901 as determined by The New York Times. The year of its release, she teamed up with playwright Lawrence Marston to adapt her story to the Broadway stage in a production by Charles Frohman.

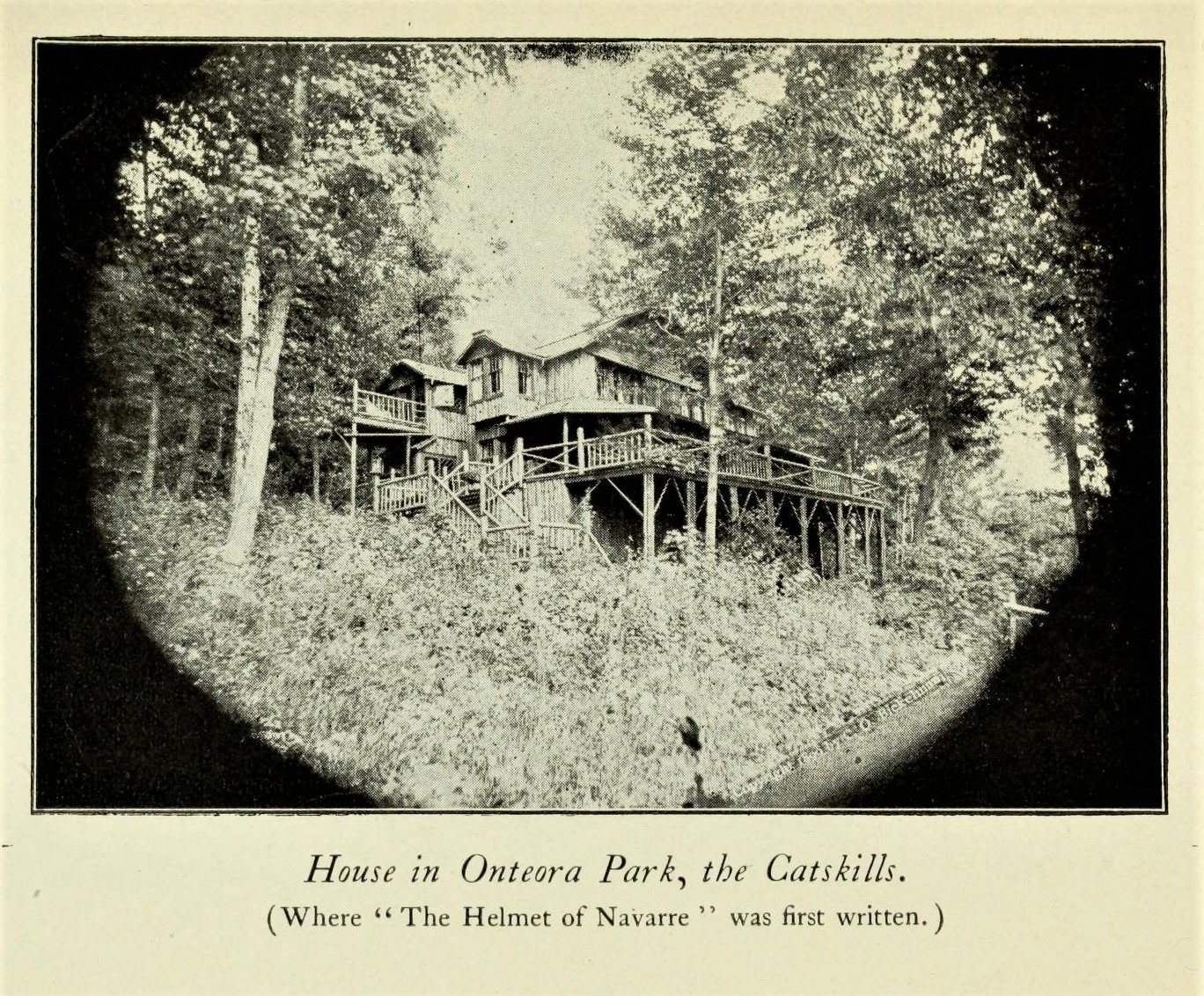
The home where Runkle wrote The Helmet of Navarre in New York
