= Harold Varner =

Harold Varner may refer to:

- Harold Varner (architect) (1935–2013)
- Harold Varner III (born 1990), American golfer
