= Meadowdale, Jackson County, West Virginia =

Meadowdale, West Virginia
- Unincorporated community
- Location within West Virginia Location within the United States
- Coordinates: 38°53′51″N 81°36′01″W
- Country: United States
- State: West Virginia
- County: Jackson
- Elevation: 627 ft (191 m)
- Time zone: UTC-5 (Eastern (EST))
  - Summer (DST): UTC-4 (EDT)
- Area codes: 304 & 681
- GNIS feature ID: 1549816

Meadowdale is an unincorporated community in Jackson County, West Virginia, United States. Meadowdale is located on County Route 13 and the Right Fork Sandy Creek, 8.1 miles (13.0 km) northeast of Ripley. Meadowdale once had a post office, which is now closed.
