= Wilding, West Virginia =

- Unincorporated community
- Location within West Virginia Location within the United States
- Coordinates: 38°56′53″N 81°41′10″W
- Country: United States
- State: West Virginia
- County: Jackson
- Elevation: 627 ft (191 m)
- Time zone: UTC-5 (Eastern (EST))
  - Summer (DST): UTC-4 (EDT)
- Area codes: 304 & 681
- GNIS feature ID: 1555985

Wilding is an unincorporated community in Jackson County, West Virginia, United States. Wilding is located on County Highway 3, 4 miles (6.4 km) east of Ravenswood. Wilding once had a post office, which is now closed.
