= Frank Varner =

Norwegian businessman

Frank Varner (14 July 1937 – 26 June 2001) was a Norwegian businessman. He established the holding company Varner-Gruppen, which developed into the largest operator in the textile retailing trade in Norway.

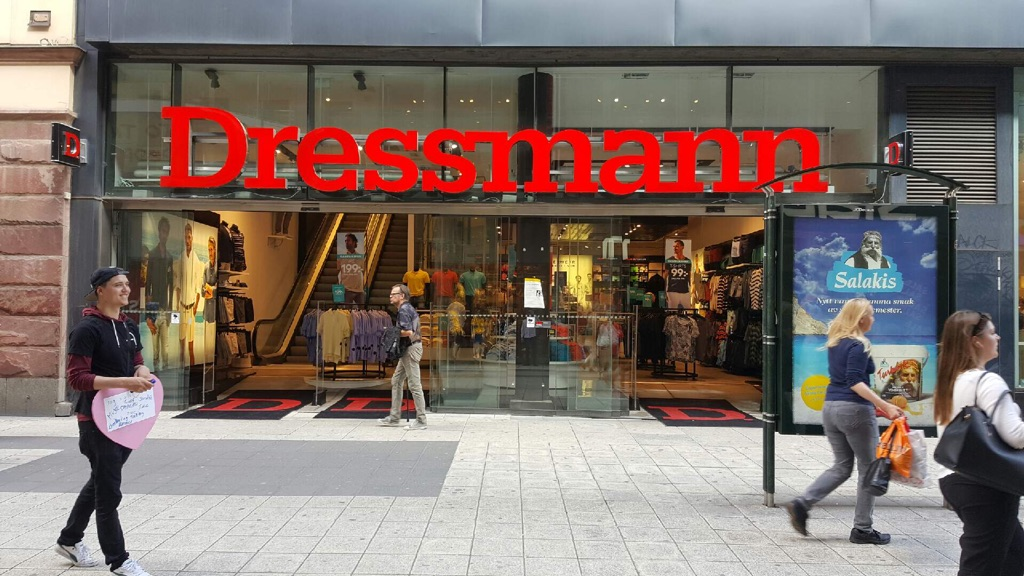
Dressmann was founded by Frank Varner

== Biography ==
He was born in Oslo to Petter Oskar Varner (1903–65) and Solveig Kleve (1904–77). In 1962, he established his first clothing store on Thorvald Meyersgate in Grünerløkka in Oslo. In 1965, Varner opened two more stores in Oslo and Trondheim. In 1967 he founded the Dressmann chain of men's clothing stores. In 1985 he entered women's clothing, with the launch of Carlings. In 1989, Varner acquired an owner's share of more than 90 percent in Jonas Øglænd AS. This was followed by the purchase of Cubus (1989), Bik Bok (1991) and Vivikes (1994). In 1994 he also started the chain Varners.

== Personal life ==
He settled in Asker. He married Turid Iversen in 1961. They were the parents of three sons. He died in Oslo during 2001.
