= Browning, Summers County, West Virginia =

Unincorporated community in West Virginia, United States

Browning, West Virginia
- Unincorporated community
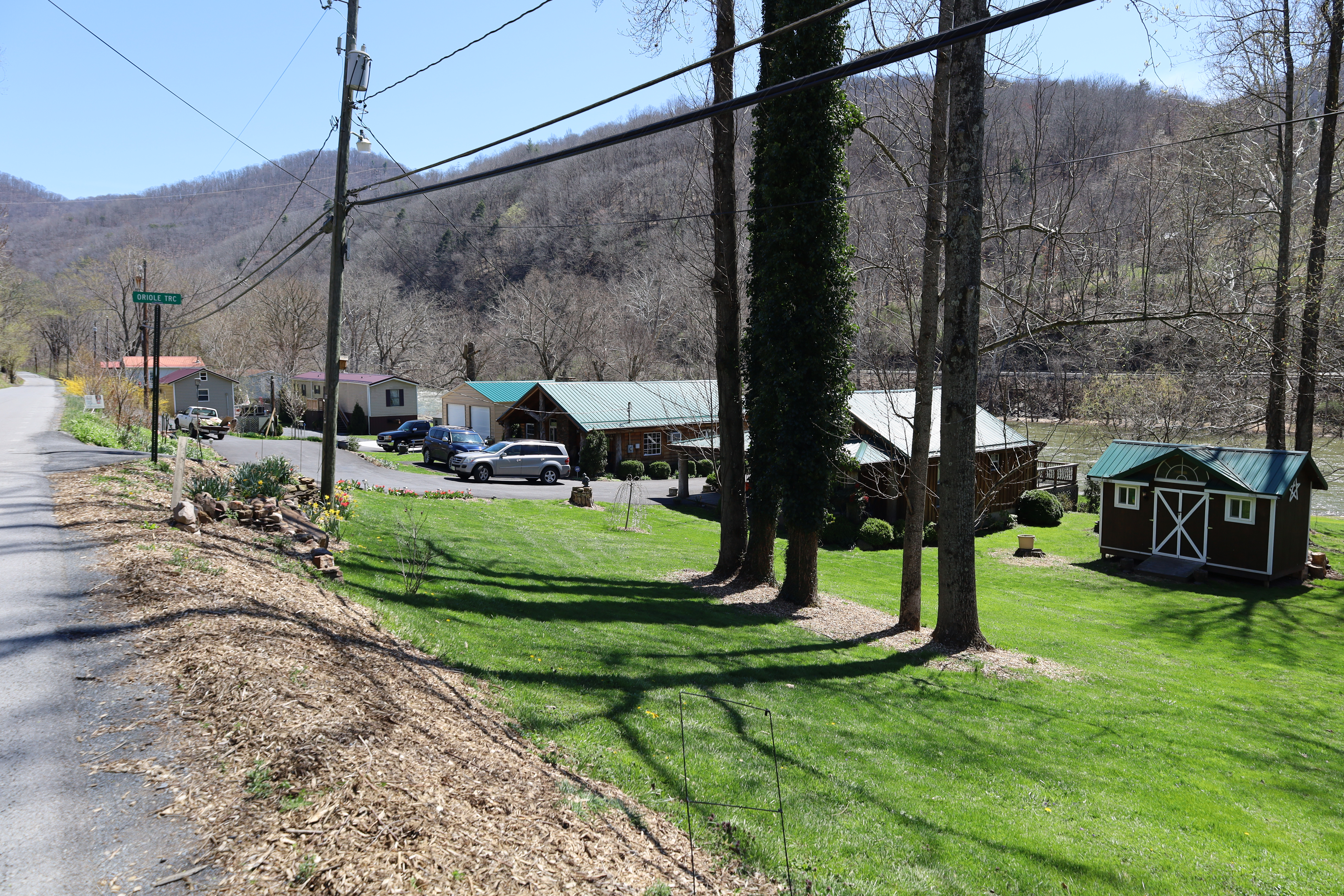
- Buildings in Browning in 2022

- Location within West Virginia Location within the United States
- Coordinates: 37°39′08″N 80°51′29″W
- Country: United States
- State: West Virginia
- County: Summers
- Elevation: 1,404 ft (428 m)
- Time zone: UTC-5 (Eastern (EST))
  - Summer (DST): UTC-4 (EDT)
- Area codes: 304 & 681
- GNIS feature ID: 1553987

Browning is an unincorporated community in Summers County, West Virginia, United States. Browning is located on the Greenbrier River, southeast of Hinton.
