= Duncan, West Virginia =

Unincorporated community in West Virginia, United States

- Unincorporated community
- Location within West Virginia Location within the United States
- Coordinates: 38°54′10″N 81°34′24″W
- Country: United States
- State: West Virginia
- County: Jackson
- Elevation: 630 ft (190 m)
- Time zone: UTC-5 (Eastern (EST))
  - Summer (DST): UTC-4 (EDT)
- Area codes: 304 & 681
- GNIS feature ID: 1549662

Duncan is an unincorporated community in Jackson County, West Virginia, United States. Duncan is located on the Right Fork Sandy Creek and County Route 13, 8 miles (13 km) west of Reedy. Duncan had a post office, which opened on February 10, 1892, and closed on July 1, 1989.
