= Liverpool, West Virginia =

- Unincorporated community
- Location within West Virginia Location within the United States
- Coordinates: 38°53′41″N 81°31′50″W
- Country: United States
- State: West Virginia
- Counties: Jackson and Roane
- Elevation: 669 ft (204 m)
- Time zone: UTC-5 (Eastern (EST))
  - Summer (DST): UTC-4 (EDT)
- ZIP codes: 25257
- Area codes: 304 & 681
- GNIS feature ID: 1542273

Liverpool is an unincorporated community in Jackson and Roane counties, West Virginia, United States. Liverpool is located along the Right Fork Sandy Creek at the junction of Jackson County Route 13 and Roane County Route 1, 5.7 miles (9.2 km) west of Reedy Liverpool had a post office, which closed on May 30, 1989. The community was named after Liverpool, in England.
