= Lowdell, West Virginia =

Lowdell
- Unincorporated community
- Location within the state of West Virginia Lowdell (the United States)
- Coordinates: 39°3′35″N 81°36′40″W
- Country: United States
- State: West Virginia
- County: Wood
- Elevation: 656 ft (200 m)
- Time zone: UTC-5 (Eastern (EST))
  - Summer (DST): UTC-4 (EDT)
- GNIS feature ID: 1555004

Lowdell is an unincorporated community located in Wood County, West Virginia, United States, situated along Pond Creek.
