= New Era, West Virginia =

- Unincorporated community
- Location within West Virginia Location within the United States
- Coordinates: 38°54′34″N 81°39′49″W
- Country: United States
- State: West Virginia
- County: Jackson
- Elevation: 604 ft (184 m)
- Time zone: UTC-5 (Eastern (EST))
  - Summer (DST): UTC-4 (EDT)
- Area codes: 304 & 681
- GNIS feature ID: 1549849

New Era is an unincorporated community in Jackson County, West Virginia, United States. New Era is located on County Route 21, 6.75 miles (10.86 km) north-northeast of Ripley.
