= Varner-Gruppen =

Norwegian textile retailer

Varner-Gruppen AS
- Company type: Private
- Industry: Retail
- Founded: 1962
- Founder: Frank Varner
- Headquarters: Oslo, Norway
- Area served: Northern Europe
- Revenue: NOK 7,609 million (2006)
- Operating income: NOK 895 million (2006)
- Net income: NOK 648 million (2006)
- Owner: Turid Varner; Marius Varner; Petter Varner; Joakim Varner
- Number of employees: 7,442
- Website: www.varner.com

Varner-Gruppen AS is a textile firm in Norway with approximately 500 stores around the country, including Bik Bok, Carlings, Cubus, Dressmann and Dressmann XL, Junkyard, Volt, and Levi's Store. The stores are located in Norway, Sweden, Finland, and Iceland. The group has more than 1,100 stores in total as of 2025.

== History ==
Varner-Gruppen was founded by Frank Varner in 1962 when he opened his first store. Five years later he launched the Dressmann chain. In 1985 the group entered women's clothing with the launch of Carlings. This was followed by the purchase of Cubus (1989), Bik Bok (1991) and Vivikes (1994). During the latter part of the 2000s, Varner has had an average store growth of about 80 outlets. The company has since been taken over by Frank Varner's children Stein Marius, Petter, and Joakim Varner. The company is privately held and unlisted.

Varner's first store, called Frank Varner, was opened in 1962 on Thorvald Meyersgate in the Grünerløkka borough of Oslo. This was followed by the opening of stores in Oslo and Trondheim within the next several years, and in 1967, the chain was named Dressmann.

Jonas Øglænd, a conglomerate which owned the country's largest textile chain, Cubus, was purchased in 1989.

Carlings, a jeans store, opened on Storgata in Oslo in 1985.

The young women's clothing chain Bik Bok was purchased in 1991. Vivikes, another women's clothing chain, was purchased in 1994. In 2016, all Vivikes stores were renamed Days Like This; the chain was later closed in 2019.

Varner's sons Petter and Stein Marius took over operations in 1995. The same year, the company opened its first location abroad, in Latvia, later expanding to Poland and Germany by 2001. In 2001 Varner acquired Urban, which focused on snowboard and skateboard-related fashion. Urban was replaced by Junkyard in 2020.

Volt and WOW, focusing on 19–35 year-old men and 8–15 year-old girls, respectively, were established in 2006. WOW was intended to be the "little sister" to Bik Bok. All WOW stores were closed and the brand was merged into Cubus as a product line in 2020.

In 2019 they bought the Swedish skateboard, snowboard, footwear and streetwear retailer Junkyard to help with their e-commerce business and to open more physical Junkyard stores in Norway and Sweden. The Junkyard headquarters was moved from Sweden to Norway.

In 2014 Latvia closed all Varner-Gruppen stores. All stores in Germany were closed in 2020, after 19 years in the country, as well as in Austria. As of 2025, Varner is represented in four countries, Norway, Sweden, Finland, and Iceland.
