= Browning, Jackson County, West Virginia =

Unincorporated community in West Virginia, United States

- Unincorporated community
- Location within West Virginia Location within the United States
- Coordinates: 39°1′28″N 81°39′39″W
- Country: United States
- State: West Virginia
- County: Jackson
- Elevation: 1,145 ft (349 m)
- Time zone: UTC-5 (Eastern (EST))
  - Summer (DST): UTC-4 (EDT)
- ZIP codes: 25951
- Area code: 304
- GNIS ID: 1559896

Browning was an unincorporated community in Jackson County, West Virginia.
