= Sherman, West Virginia =

- Unincorporated community
- Location within West Virginia Location within the United States
- Coordinates: 38°59′30″N 81°45′42″W
- Country: United States
- State: West Virginia
- County: Jackson
- Time zone: UTC-5 (Eastern (EST))
  - Summer (DST): UTC-4 (EDT)
- ZIP codes: 26173

Sherman (also Mouth of Little Sandy) is an unincorporated community in northern Jackson County, West Virginia, United States, along the Ohio River. It lies along West Virginia Route 68 north of the city of Ravenswood. Its elevation is 600 feet (183 m).

The community was named after the local Sherman family.

== See also ==
- List of cities and towns along the Ohio River
