= Muses Bottom, West Virginia =

- Unincorporated community
- Location within West Virginia Location within the United States
- Coordinates: 39°02′29″N 81°46′52″W
- Country: United States
- State: West Virginia
- County: Jackson
- Elevation: 587 ft (179 m)
- Time zone: UTC-5 (Eastern (EST))
  - Summer (DST): UTC-4 (EDT)
- Area codes: 304 & 681
- GNIS feature ID: 1544019

Muses Bottom is an unincorporated community in Jackson County, West Virginia, United States. Muses Bottom is located on the Ohio River and West Virginia Route 68, 6.5 miles (10.5 km) north of Ravenswood. Muses Bottom once had a post office, which is now closed.

The community most likely was named after the local Muse (or Le Mus) family.
