= Odaville, West Virginia =

- Unincorporated community
- Location within West Virginia Location within the United States
- Coordinates: 38°55′57″N 81°38′26″W
- Country: United States
- State: West Virginia
- County: Jackson
- Elevation: 623 ft (190 m)
- Time zone: UTC-5 (Eastern (EST))
  - Summer (DST): UTC-4 (EDT)
- Area codes: 304 & 681
- GNIS feature ID: 1555257

Odaville is an unincorporated community in Jackson County, West Virginia, United States. Odaville is located on the Left Fork Sandy Creek and County Highway 21, 8.7 miles (14.0 km) north-northeast of Ripley. Odaville once had a post office, which is now closed.
