= Crow Summit, West Virginia =

Unincorporated community in West Virginia, United States

- Unincorporated community
- Location within West Virginia Location within the United States
- Coordinates: 38°54′23″N 81°41′08″W
- Country: United States
- State: West Virginia
- County: Jackson
- Elevation: 607 ft (185 m)
- Time zone: UTC-5 (Eastern (EST))
  - Summer (DST): UTC-4 (EDT)
- Area codes: 304 & 681
- GNIS feature ID: 1537881

Crow Summit is an unincorporated community in Jackson County, West Virginia, United States. Crow Summit is located on County Route 56, 6.2 miles (10.0 km) north of Ripley. Crow Summit once had a post office, which is now closed. The community was named after Michael Crow, an original owner of the town site.
