= Bertha Runkle =

American writer

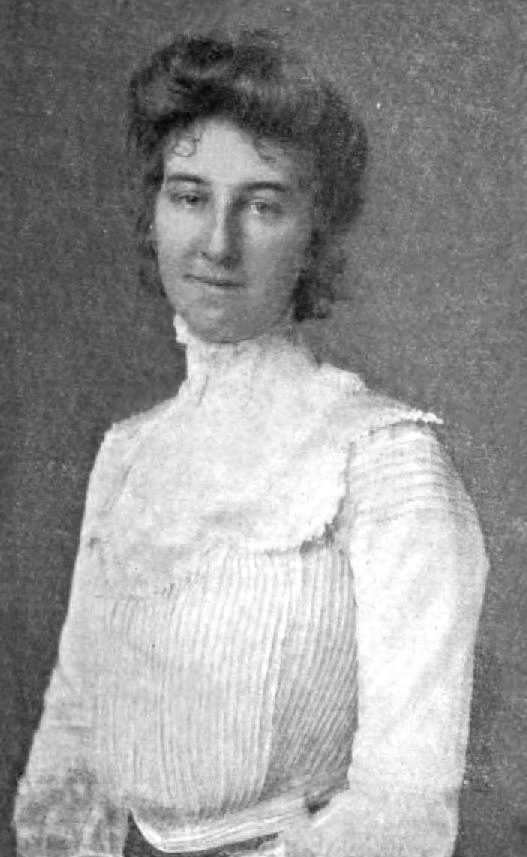
- Bertha Runkle 1901
- Born: 1879; Berkeley Heights, New Jersey
- Died: 1958 (aged 78–79)
- Occupation: Novelist
- Spouse: Captain Louis H. Bash
- Writing career
- Language: English
- Notable work: The Helmet of Navarre

Bertha Runkle (after marriage, Bash; 1879–1958) was an American novelist and playwright born in Berkeley Heights, New Jersey. From a literary family, she wrote five novels. Her first and best known, The Helmet of Navarre, was made into a Broadway play.

== Early years ==
Her father, Cornelius A. Runkle (1833–1888), died when Runkle was nine, and she and her mother Lucia Runkle moved to New York City. Her father had been a respected New York lawyer who had served as legal counsel for the New York Tribune and her mother had worked as an editorial writer.

Lucia Runkle came upon a poem by her daughter and was anxious to have it judged on its merits by the editor-in-chief. With no clue to the authorship, he was delighted with its strength, its unusual form, and the splendid swing of the lines. The poem was at once ordered into "The World's Best Literature," and Edmund Clarence Stedman afterward included it in his American Anthology. As a result, Runkle was sent to Miss Bracket's school, a fashionable girls' boarding school in New York, until she was thirteen, when she was taken away because of delicate health. From that time she was schooled in the large home library, and studied with her mother.

In 1893, her mother purchased a small piece of land at Onteora in Tannersville, New York, and built a house where she and her daughter lived every summer. Here she taught herself how to write a successful novel, and also how to play golf and tennis, becoming an avid player of both.

== Career ==
=== The Helmet of Navarre ===
Bertha Runkle was only twenty-one years old when her book The Helmet of Navarre was first serialized in The Century Magazine. She had the story in her mind for two years or so, and the actual writing took about four months. The title was taken from a passage in Thomas Babbington Macaulay's poem Ivry, which its author adopted as a motto:

"Press where ye see my white plume shine amidst the ranks of war,

"And be your oriflamme today, the helmet of Navarre."

Its first form was much shorter, and it was a tale of political intrigue and martial adventure, without a heroine. But the editor of The Century Company insisted that a spoiled public would not be content without "the swish of the petticoats" and a dozen more chapters were called for, which she supplied.

The magazine serialization was so well received that 100,000 copies were printed for the first edition of the book. The book went on to become No. 3 on the list of bestselling novels in the United States for the entire year of 1901 as determined by The New York Times. The year of its release, she teamed up with playwright Lawrence Marston to adapt her story to the Broadway stage in a production by Charles Frohman.

=== The Truth About Tolna ===
The magazine for which her mother had written, The Outlook, had the following to say about Runkle's second novel, The Truth About Tolna.

"The young lady who achieved popularity at a single stroke, Miss Bertha Runkle, has written of an American fortnight almost as crowded with events as were those few amazing days in The Helmet of Navarre. There are a dash and vigor about the handling of this novel of modern New York life that will carry it, perhaps, beyond its real merits. The double character forced upon Tolna by his artistic friend and manager gives opportunity for several farcical situations and an occasional semi-tragic note. Tolna and Mrs. Burnham are most entertaining. Denys Alden is less convincing than some other members of his social set."

=== The Scarlet Rider ===
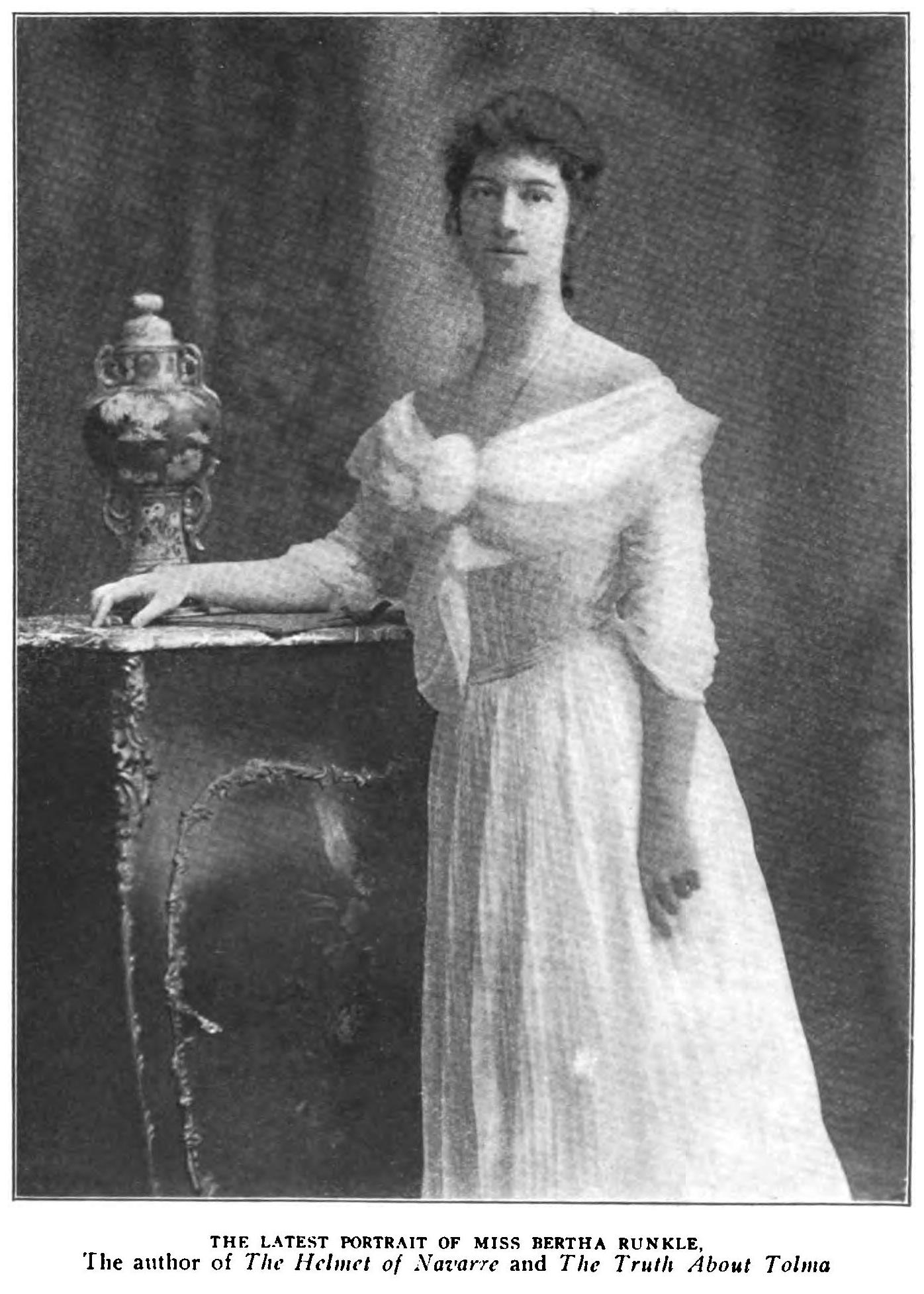
Portrait of Bertha Runkle in The Bookman 1906

The Bookman had the following to say about The Scarlet Rider,

"The scene of this new story is the Isle of Wight, the date is the period of the American Revolution, and the centre of interest is an aristocratic but impoverished family in which the title, in the absence of male heirs, will descend to the beautiful but headstrong and undisciplined daughter who has been left to bring herself up as best she could. Her unhappy neglected and invalid mother seldom leaves her own chamber, while her dissolute spendthrift father is, for the most part, away from home, engaged in diversions of which drinking and gaming form the mildest elements.

At the opening of the story the whole neighbourhood is in a turmoil concerning a certain audacious highwayman, known only as the "Scarlet Rider", who has been terrorising all the southern coast of England. Consequently, when Lettice, the madcap daughter of Lord Yarracombe, finds a handsome young stranger hiding behind a chest in a cobwebbed room of the old house, it is only natural that she should leap to the conclusion that he is the highwayman in question, and quite in keeping with her adventurous spirit that she should seek to shield him by letting him masquerade as the new assistant butler.

The situation is well developed and the whole tone of the narrative has a well sustained lightness with just a hint of tragedy lurking beneath the surface. But the one little fact which robs this moment of its promised bigness is that the secret of the story is far too transparent. It takes no special cleverness to discover the Scarlet Rider's identity before the book is one third read and the only remaining surprise is at the density of the other actors in the story who are phenomenally long in discovering the truth."

=== Straight Down the Crooked Lane ===
Country Life in America had the following to say about Runkle's fourth novel, Straight Down the Crooked Lane,

"A straightforward story about folks who are recognizably human, as well as interesting; and the narrative gets off swiftly in the first chapter and never slackens until the end. The scene shifts from Newport high society life to the Philippines; making stops in Japan and India. "Straight Down the Crooked Lane" has all the story-telling charm of "The Helmet of Navarre"; but it deals with people and places of today, and is enriched by the author's fuller years of artistic endeavor. It is undoubtedly the best novel so far achieved by that past master of story telling, Bertha Runkle."

== Personal life ==
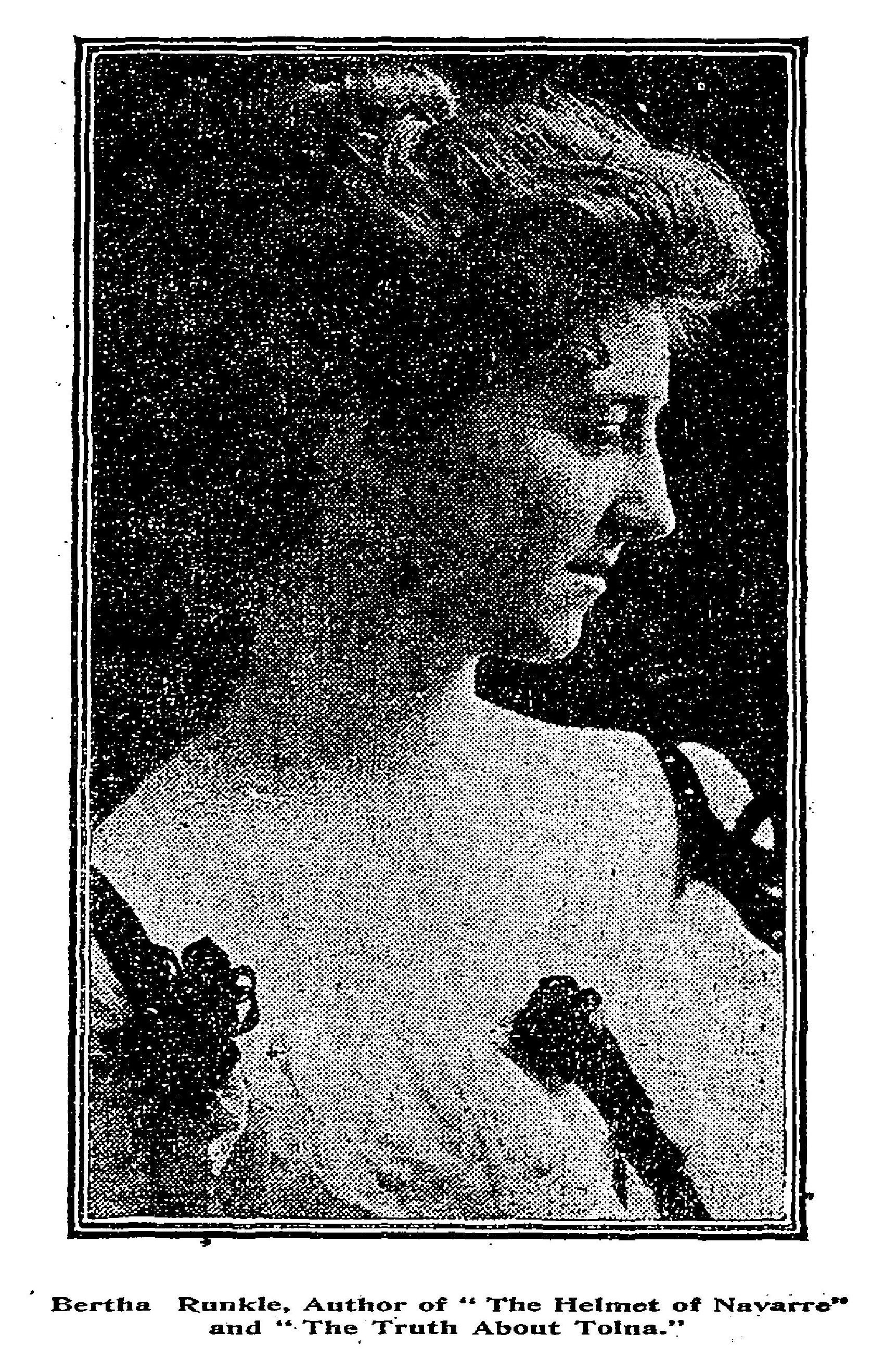
The New York Times 1906

On October 26, 1904, Runkle married Captain Louis Hermann Bash in San Francisco. She had met him on a previous visit when he was stationed at the Presidio of San Francisco. He had subsequently been reassigned to the Philippines and the couple returned there after the wedding where they spent three years. They moved to San Antonio, Texas in 1909 and later to Washington, D.C. On her return from the Philippines, she gave an interview to The New York Times about her experience in that country,

NYT: "Do they really like the Americans?"
Runkle: "That has been one of the problems that I could never solve satisfactorily." "What they object to in us is our free and easy manners." "They feel that we lack the graces and politeness of the Spanish, which they have been used to and which they themselves absorbed." "The native, I think, has deteriorated in manners by contact with the Americans." "The Filipinos learn our language very quickly and they pronounce very well." "They learn to play instruments very well." "Of course, the social and army life in Manila has its amusing side." "One might write a story about the American life in Manila that would resemble 'The Gadsbys' for instance, but I could scarcely undertake the task."

== Selected works ==
- The Helmet of Navarre (1901)
- "Artemisia's mirror" in A House Party: an account of stories told at a gathering of famous American authors (1901) (anthology)
- The Truth About Tolna (1906)
- The Scarlet Rider (1913)
- Straight Down The Crooked Lane (1915)
- The Island (1921)
