= Drift Run, West Virginia =

Unincorporated community in West Virginia, United States

- Unincorporated community
- Location within West Virginia Location within the United States
- Coordinates: 38°56′25″N 81°38′3″W
- Country: United States
- State: West Virginia
- County: Jackson
- Elevation: 607 ft (185 m)
- Time zone: UTC-5 (Eastern (EST))
  - Summer (DST): UTC-4 (EDT)
- GNIS ID: 1549660

Drift Run is an unincorporated community in Jackson County, West Virginia, United States.
