= Murraysville, West Virginia =

- Unincorporated community
- Location within West Virginia Location within the United States
- Coordinates: 39°4′39″N 81°48′23″W
- Country: United States
- State: West Virginia
- County: Jackson
- Time zone: UTC-5 (Eastern (EST))
  - Summer (DST): UTC-4 (EDT)

Murraysville is an unincorporated community in northern Jackson County, West Virginia, United States. It is located along the Ohio River across from Long Bottom, Ohio. It lies along Murraysville Road, north of the city of Ripley, the county seat of Jackson County. Its elevation is 591 feet (180 m).

== See also ==
- List of cities and towns along the Ohio River
