= Skull Run, West Virginia =

- Unincorporated community
- Location within West Virginia Location within the United States
- Coordinates: 39°0′30″N 81°45′33″W
- Country: United States
- State: West Virginia
- County: Jackson
- Elevation: 600 ft (180 m)
- Time zone: UTC-5 (Eastern (EST))
  - Summer (DST): UTC-4 (EDT)
- GNIS ID: 1549933

Skull Run is an unincorporated community in Jackson County, West Virginia, United States. Their Post Office no longer is in service.

The community takes its name from nearby Skull Run creek.
