= Utica, West Virginia =

- Unincorporated community
- Location within West Virginia Location within the United States
- Coordinates: 39°02′43″N 81°39′31″W
- Country: United States
- State: West Virginia
- County: Jackson
- Elevation: 673 ft (205 m)
- Time zone: UTC-5 (Eastern (EST))
  - Summer (DST): UTC-4 (EDT)
- Area codes: 304 & 681
- GNIS feature ID: 1549965

Utica is an unincorporated community in Jackson County, West Virginia, United States. Utica is located on Cabin Fork and County Highway 1/2, 8.7 miles (14.0 km) northeast of Ravenswood. Utica once had a post office, which is now closed.
