= Topins Grove, West Virginia =

- Unincorporated community
- Location within West Virginia Location within the United States
- Coordinates: 39°03′05″N 81°42′25″W
- Country: United States
- State: West Virginia
- County: Jackson
- Elevation: 640 ft (200 m)
- Time zone: UTC-5 (Eastern (EST))
  - Summer (DST): UTC-4 (EDT)
- Area codes: 304 & 681
- GNIS feature ID: 1549956

Topins Grove is an unincorporated community in Jackson County, West Virginia, United States. Topins Grove is located on Little Pond Creek and County Highway 6, 7.7 miles (12.4 km) north-northeast of Ravenswood. Topins Grove once had a post office, which is now closed.
