= Lockhart, West Virginia =

- Unincorporated community
- Location within West Virginia Location within the United States
- Coordinates: 38°57′54″N 81°36′54″W
- Country: United States
- State: West Virginia
- County: Jackson
- Elevation: 640 ft (200 m)
- Time zone: UTC-5 (Eastern (EST))
  - Summer (DST): UTC-4 (EDT)
- Area codes: 304 & 681
- GNIS feature ID: 1542280

Lockhart is an unincorporated community in Jackson County, West Virginia, United States. Lockhart is located on the Left Fork Sandy Creek and County Highway 21, 8 miles (13 km) east of Ravenswood. Lockhart once had a post office, which is now closed.
