= National Register of Historic Places listings in Pendleton County, West Virginia =

Location of Pendleton County in West Virginia

This is a list of the National Register of Historic Places listings in Pendleton County, West Virginia.

This is intended to be a complete list of the properties and districts on the National Register of Historic Places in Pendleton County, West Virginia, United States. The locations of National Register properties and districts for which the latitude and longitude coordinates are included below, may be seen in a Google map.

There are 13 properties and districts listed on the National Register in the county.

This National Park Service list is complete through NPS recent listings posted October 16, 2026.

Contents: Counties in West Virginia

Barbour - Berkeley - Boone - Braxton - Brooke - Cabell - Calhoun - Clay - Doddridge - Fayette - Gilmer - Grant - Greenbrier - Hampshire - Hancock - Hardy - Harrison - Jackson - Jefferson - Kanawha - Lewis - Lincoln - Logan - Marion - Marshall - Mason - McDowell - Mercer - Mineral - Mingo - Monongalia - Monroe - Morgan - Nicholas - Ohio - Pendleton - Pleasants - Pocahontas - Preston - Putnam - Raleigh - Randolph - Ritchie - Roane - Summers - Taylor - Tucker - Tyler - Upshur - Wayne - Webster - Wetzel - Wirt - Wood - Wyoming

== Current listings ==
	Name on the Register	Image	Date listed	Location	City or town	Description
1	Boggs Mill		August 25, 2004 (#04000915)	U.S. Route 33 and WV 28, north of junction with County Route 9; 38°49′09″N 79°23′09″W	Seneca Rocks	
2	Bowers House	Bowers House	July 10, 1985 (#85001593)	Brandywine-Sugar Grove Rd. 38°30′43″N 79°18′37″W	Sugar Grove	
3	Circleville School	Circleville School	November 9, 1995 (#95001323)	WV 28; 38°40′21″N 79°29′31″W	Circleville	
4	Cunningham-Hevener House	Cunningham-Hevener House	July 10, 1985 (#85001595)	U.S. Route 220; 38°46′40″N 79°17′05″W	Upper Tract	
5	Franklin Historic District	Franklin Historic District	January 15, 1986 (#86000773)	Roughly bounded by U.S. Route 33, Main St., the Potomac River, and High St. 38°38′37″N 79°19′57″W	Franklin	
6	McCoy House	McCoy House	December 10, 1982 (#82004328)	Main St. 38°38′29″N 79°19′52″W	Franklin	
7	McCoy Mill	McCoy Mill	January 14, 1986 (#86000780)	Johnstown Rd. 38°36′34″N 79°21′04″W	Franklin vicinity	
8	Old Judy Church	Old Judy Church	May 13, 1976 (#76001944)	10 miles south of Petersburg on U.S. Route 220; 38°52′00″N 79°13′07″W	Petersburg vicinity	
9	Old Probst Church	Old Probst Church	January 14, 1986 (#86000779)	County Route 21/9; 38°35′53″N 79°15′25″W	Brandywine	
10	Pendleton County Poor Farm	Pendleton County Poor Farm	January 14, 1986 (#86000775)	U.S. Route 220; 38°44′59″N 79°17′15″W	Upper Tract	
11	Ananias Pitsenbarger Farm	Ananias Pitsenbarger Farm	August 18, 2011 (#11000557)	WV 23 approximately 1/4 mile south of junction with County Route 23/1; 38°34′40″N 79°19′07″W	Franklin vicinity	
12	Priest Mill	Priest Mill	April 4, 2000 (#00000250)	Off U.S. Route 220, near the Low-Water Bridge; 38°38′22″N 79°19′50″W	Franklin vicinity	
13	Sites Homestead	Sites Homestead	May 20, 1993 (#93000382)	Seneca Rocks Visitor Center; 38°50′09″N 79°22′26″W	Seneca Rocks	

== See also ==
- List of National Historic Landmarks in West Virginia
- National Register of Historic Places listings in West Virginia
