= McCoy House =

McCoy House, McCoy Farmhouse, McCoy Farm or variations may refer to:

- McCoy House (Kirkwood, Delaware), in New Castle County, listed on the National Register of Historic Places (NRHP)
- McCoy Polygonal Barn, Hepburn, Iowa, NRHP-listed
- Andrew McCoy House, Cave City, Kentucky, NRHP-listed in Barren County
- Owens–McCoy House, Independence, Missouri, NRHP-listed in Jackson County
- Harvey McCoy House, Aztec, New Mexico, NRHP-listed in San Juan County
- McCoy-Maddox House, Aztec, New Mexico, in San Juan County, NRHP-listed
- Albert McCoy Farm, Huntersville, North Carolina, in Mecklenburg County, NRHP-listed
- McCoy House (Lewistown, Pennsylvania), in Mifflin County, NRHP-listed
- McCoy–Shoemaker Farm, Upton, Pennsylvania, in Franklin County, NRHP-listed
- Benjamin McCoy House, Cassatt, South Carolina, in Kershaw County, NRHP-listed
- King–Lancaster–McCoy–Mitchell House, Bristol, Virginia, NRHP-listed
- McCoy Farmstead (Holly Hill, South Carolina), in Orangeburg County, NRHP-listed
- McCoy House (Franklin, West Virginia), NRHP-listed
- McCoy Mill, Franklin, West Virginia, in Pendleton County, NRHP-listed
- McCoy Farmhouse (Fitchburg, Wisconsin), in Dane County, NRHP-listed
