= McCoy =

McCoy, McCoys or McCoy's may refer to:

== Places ==
=== United States ===
- McCoy, Colorado, an unincorporated town
- McCoy, Oregon, an unincorporated community
- McCoy, Atascosa County, Texas, an unincorporated community
- McCoy, Kaufman County, Texas, an unincorporated community
- McCoy Mountains, southern California
- McCoy Air Force Base, near Orlando, Florida
- Fort McCoy, Wisconsin, a United States Army base
- Lake McCoy, south of Lake Placid, Florida

=== Canada ===
- McCoy Lake, near Port Alberni, British Columbia

== Arts and entertainment ==
- McCoy (TV series), an American series that aired during the 1975–1976 season
- The McCoys, an American 1960s rock band
- McCoy (band), a British heavy metal band
- The Real McCoys, an American sitcom that aired during 1957–1963

== People and fictional characters ==
- McCoy (surname), including a list of people and fictional characters with the surname
- McCoy McLemore (1942–2009), American National Basketball Association player
- McCoy Tyner (1938–2020), American jazz pianist and composer
- McCoy de Leon (born 1995 as Marc Carlos Francis de Jesus de Leon), Filipino actor, dancer and model

== Other uses ==
- McCoy (pottery), American pottery company (1910–1990)
- McCoy's (crisp), a brand of UK crisps (potato chips)
- McCoy Stadium, a minor league baseball stadium in Pawtucket, Rhode Island, United States
- McCoy College of Business, the business school at Texas State University

== See also ==
- McCoy Center, a large office building in Columbus, Ohio, United States
- McCoy House (disambiguation), various buildings on the United States National Register of Historic Places
- Hatfield–McCoy feud (1878–1891), an American feud
- Fort McCoy, Florida, an unincorporated community
- The Real McCoy (disambiguation)
