= Franklin Historic District (West Virginia) =

Historic district in West Virginia, United States

- U.S. National Register of Historic Places
- U.S. Historic district
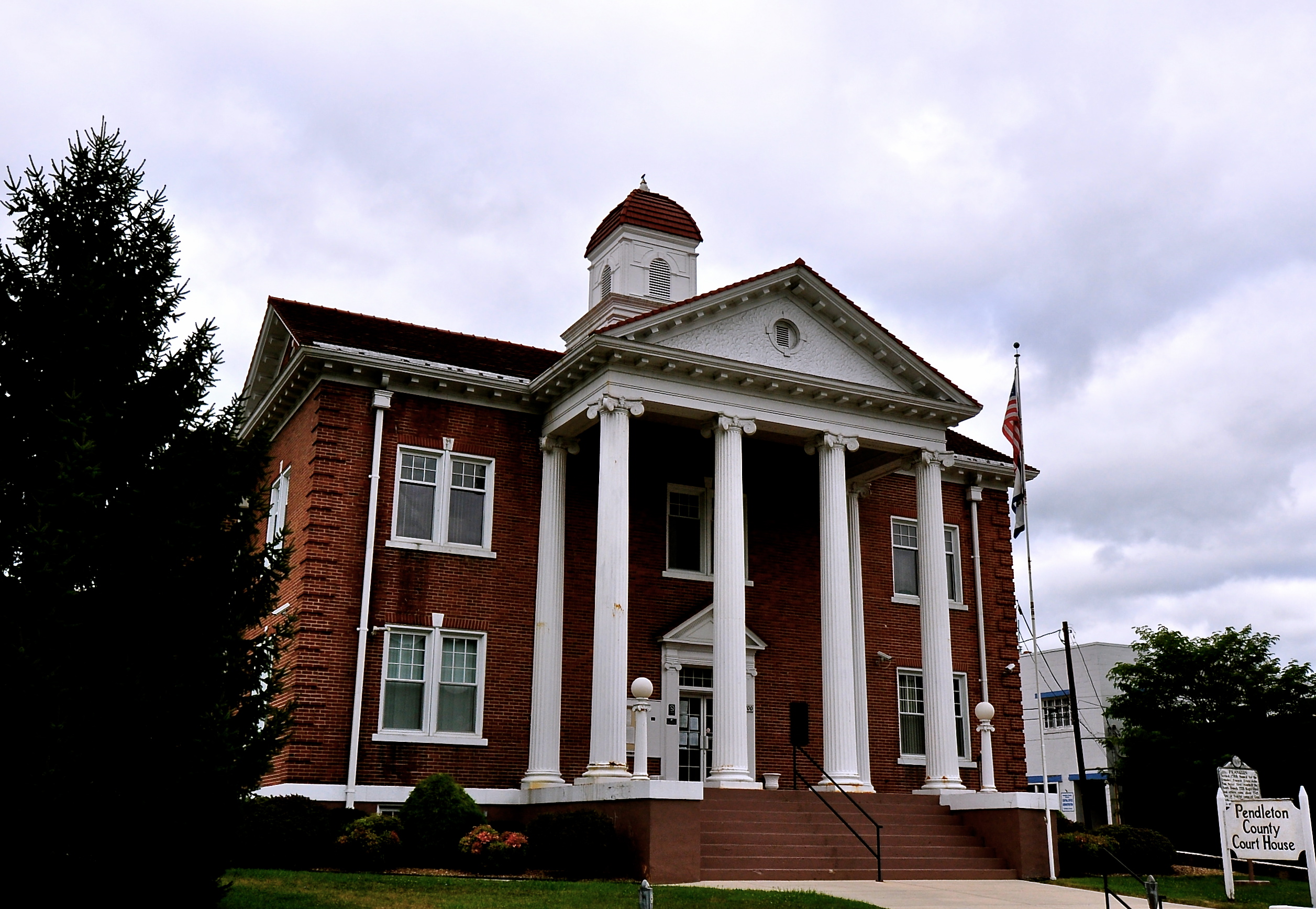
- The Pendleton County Courthouse

- Location within West Virginia Location within the United States
- Location: Roughly bounded by US 33, Main St., the Potomac River, and High St., Franklin, West Virginia
- Coordinates: 38°38′37″N 79°19′57″W
- Area: 40 acres (16 ha)
- Built: 1845
- Architectural style: Greek Revival, Queen Anne, Four-square
- MPS: South Branch Valley MRA
- NRHP reference No.: 86000773
- Added to NRHP: January 15, 1986

Franklin Historic District is a national historic district located at Franklin, Pendleton County, West Virginia. The district encompasses 111 contributing buildings, mostly residences. It also includes the central business district, much of it rebuilt after a fire in 1924. Most of the residences are in the Queen Anne or American Foursquare style, with commercial Greek Revival and Italianate-style buildings. Notable buildings include an early 19th-century, stuccoed stone farmhouse and barn, five Queen Anne style dwellings (c. 1890, c. 1900), and the Pendleton County Court House (1924-1925). Also located in the district is the separately listed McCoy House.

It was listed on the National Register of Historic Places in 1986.
