= Old Cann Mansion House =

Historic house in Delaware, United States

- U.S. National Register of Historic Places
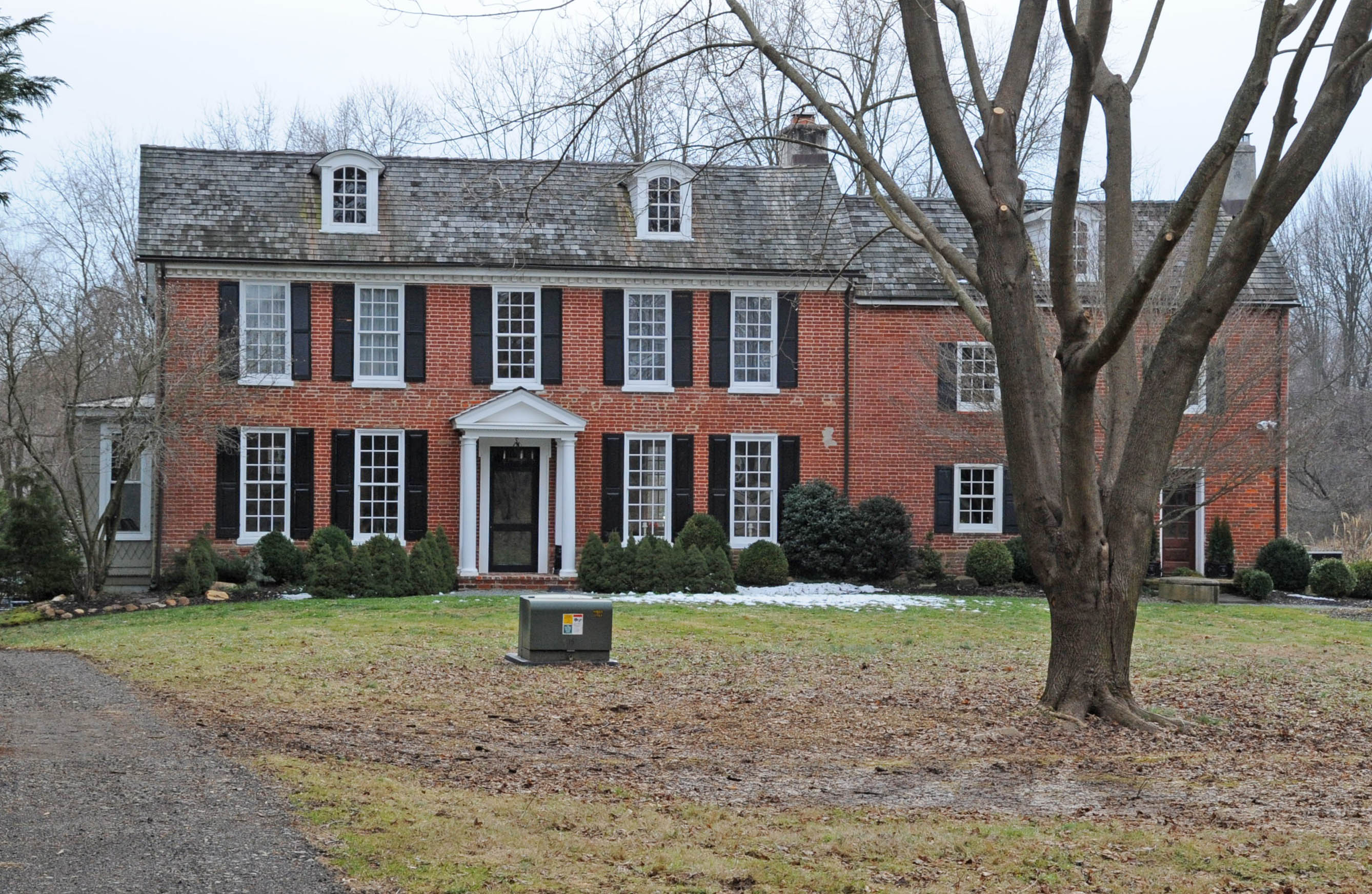

- Location within Delaware Location within the United States
- Location: 2290 Red Lion Road, Kirkwood, Delaware
- Coordinates: 39.57382°N 75.69253°W
- Area: 2.9 acres (1.2 ha)
- Built: 1792
- Architectural style: Georgian
- MPS: Red Lion Hundred MRA
- NRHP reference No.: 82002329
- Added to NRHP: April 8, 1982

Old Cann Mansion House is a historic home located at Kirkwood, New Castle County, Delaware. It was built about 1792, and consists of three sections. The main section is a 2 1/2-story, five-bay double-pile brick structure. Attached to it is a lower 2 1/2-story, single-pile wing. In the rear is a two-story, frame addition built in the late 19th century. The house is in the Georgian style. Also on the property are a contributing frame board-and-batten barn and privy, and three frame sheds.

It was added to the National Register of Historic Places in 1982.
