= Franklin Gorge =

- Location within West Virginia
- Location: Pendleton County, West Virginia
- Nearest city: Franklin, West Virginia
- Coordinates: 38°39′47.26″N 79°19′15.59″W
- Type of climbing: sport climbing crag with mostly face climbing
- Height range: 80 feet
- Pitches range: 1
- Technical grades: majority of climbs are in 5.9-5.13 range
- NCCS grades: I
- Rock type: sandstone and limestone
- Quantity of routes: weeks worth
- Climbing area developed: partially developed
- Cliff aspect: west facing
- Season: spring to fall
- Ownership: private with multiple owners
- Camping: paid at Franklin, West Virginia
- Classic climbs: Blood, Sweat, and Chalk (5.9); Aqualung (5.10a); Super Amazing Sea Monkeys (5.10c); Barnacle Bill (5.11a)
- Stars: 3/5 stars

Franklin Gorge or just Franklin or Cranklin Gorge is a small sport climbing area near Spruce Knob–Seneca Rocks National Recreation Area located near Franklin, WV. This rock climbing spot was first discovered and developed by John Burcham and friends during the early-mid 90s. The site contains mostly sport and top rope climbing as well as some traditional climbing, and is located on private land. The rock is layered sandstone and some limestone which create horizontals, and the site has pockets and huecos for the majority of the holds. This site is the first place many Mid-Atlantic climbers cut their teeth on bolted rock climbing routes before going on to challenge the New River Gorge.

== Guidebooks ==
- Online topos, circulated since the 1990s
- Hörst, Eric J. (2001). Rock climbing Virginia, West Virginia, and Maryland (1st ed.). Guilford, Conn.: FalconGuides. ISBN 1560448121.
- Horst, Eric J.; Green, Stewart M. (2013). Rock Climbing Virginia, West Virginia, and Maryland (2nd ed.). FalconGuides. ISBN 0762784342.
