= Lum's Mill House =

Historic house in Delaware, United States

- U.S. National Register of Historic Places
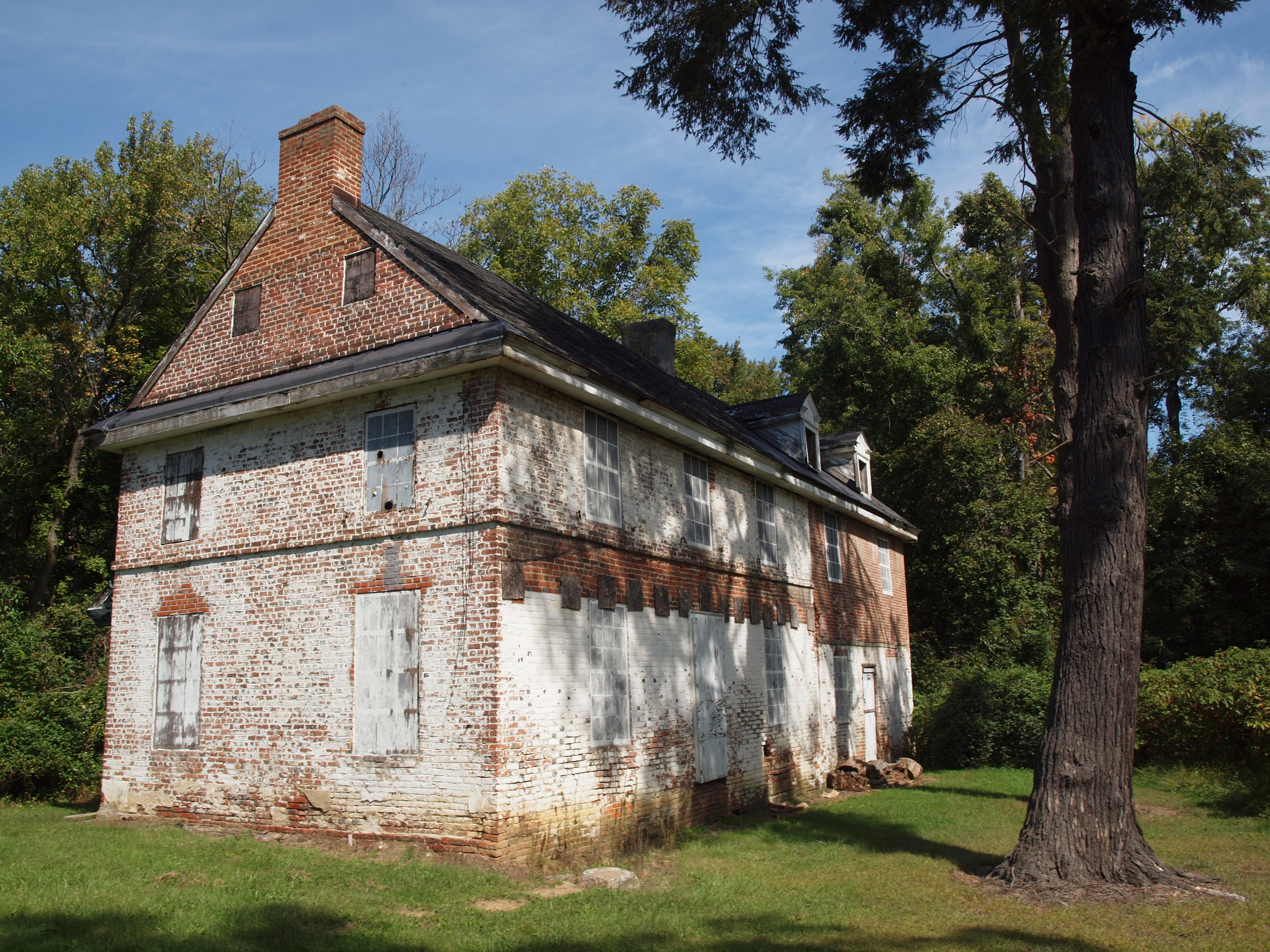

- Location within Delaware Location within the United States
- Location: Off Red Lion Road in Lums Pond State Park, Kirkwood, Delaware
- Coordinates: 39.55095°N 75.71310°W
- Area: 1 acre (0.40 ha)
- Built: c. 1713
- NRHP reference No.: 73000511
- Added to NRHP: May 22, 1973

Lum's Mill House, also known as the Clement House, Samuel Davies House, and Lum House, is a historic home located at Lums Pond State Park, Kirkwood, New Castle County, Delaware. It was built about 1713, and is a two-story, three-bay brick house. An original one-story, three-bay, extension was raised to two stories about 1809. It is believed to have been the home of Samuel Davies.

It was added to the National Register of Historic Places in 1973.
