= Old Post Office (Kirkwood, Delaware) =

Historic house in Delaware, United States

- U.S. National Register of Historic Places
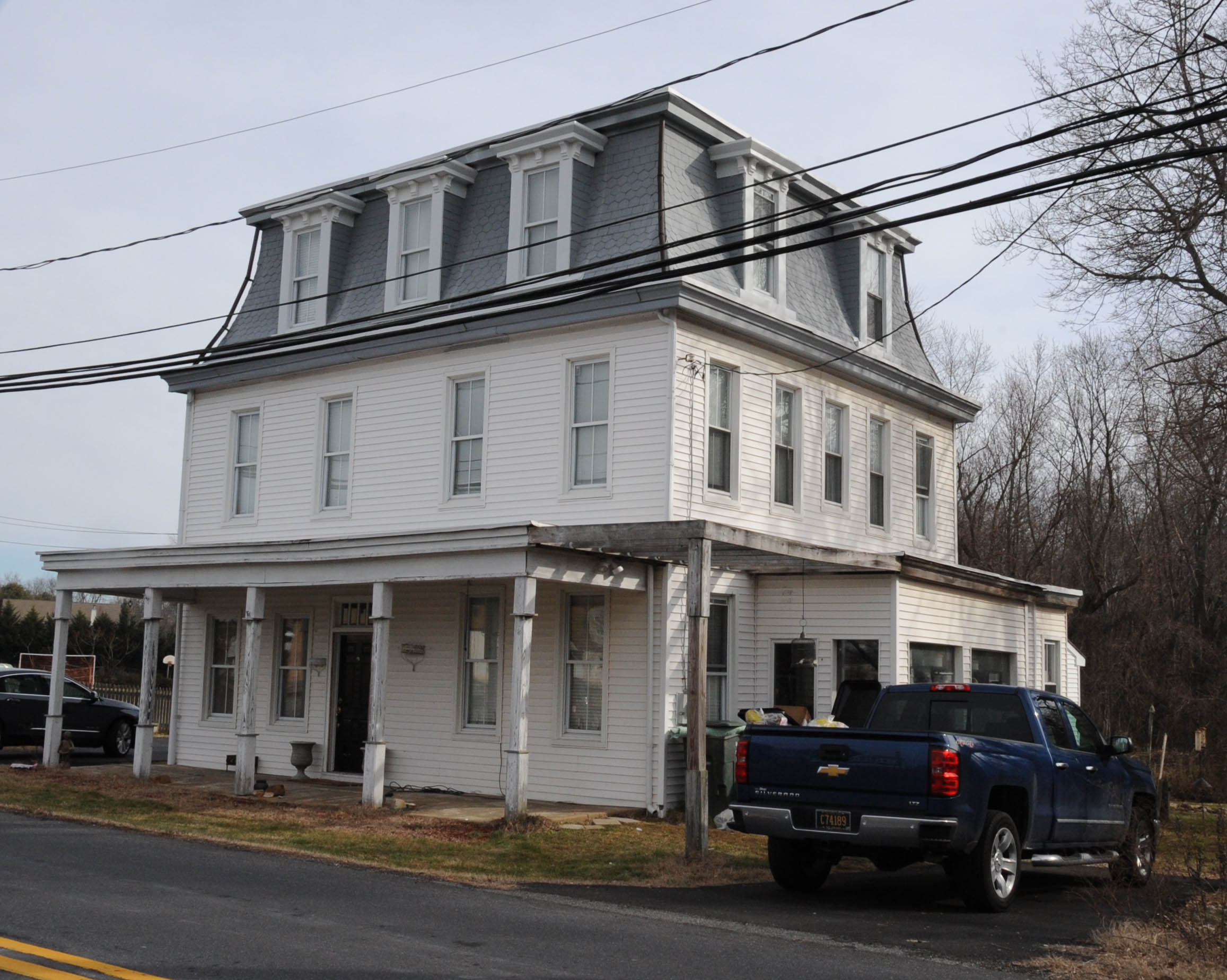

- Location within Delaware Location within the United States
- Location: 3616 Kirkwood St. Georges Rd., Kirkwood, Delaware
- Coordinates: 39.57100°N 75.69644°W
- Area: 1.6 acres (0.65 ha)
- Built: c. 1870
- Architectural style: Second Empire, Mansard
- MPS: Red Lion Hundred MRA
- NRHP reference No.: 82002330
- Added to NRHP: April 8, 1982

Old Post Office is a historic home and post office building located at Kirkwood, New Castle County, Delaware. It was built about 1870, and is a two-story, five-bay, frame double house with a mansard roof in the Second Empire style. The roof has decorative slate and the front facade features a full-width porch supported by five chamfered, wooden posts. Part of the house was once occupied by a post office and store.

It was added to the National Register of Historic Places in 1982.
