= Lums Pond State Park =

State park in Delaware, United States

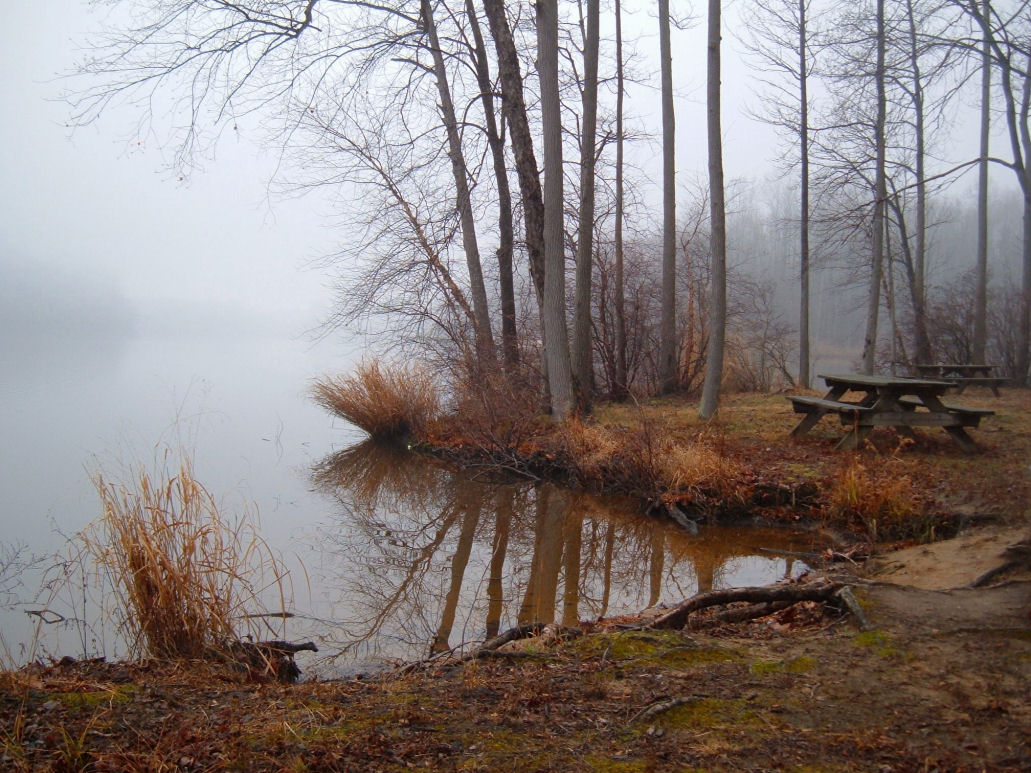
- Picnic area on Lums Pond

- Location within Delaware Location within the United States
- Location: New Castle County, Delaware, United States
- Coordinates: 39°33′15″N 75°42′54″W
- Area: 1,789.53 acres (724.20 ha)
- Elevation: 43 feet (13 m)
- Established: 1963
- Administrator: Delaware Department of Natural Resources and Environmental Control
- Website: Official website

Lums Pond State Park is a 1,790-acre (720 ha) Delaware state park near Bear, New Castle County, Delaware in the United States. The park surrounds Lums Pond, an impoundment built by the Chesapeake and Delaware Canal on St. Georges Creek. The C&D built the pond as a source of water to fill the locks of the canal that connected the Chesapeake Bay with the Delaware River during the early 19th century. Lums Pond State Park is open for a wide variety of year-round recreation.

== History ==
Lums Pond is the largest freshwater pond in Delaware, covering 189 acres (76 ha) in central New Castle County. It was built in the early 19th century as an impoundment for the Chesapeake and Delaware Canal. The pond supplied water to fill the locks of the canal and water power for a local gristmill. The pond became a natural recreational draw for the residents of Delaware. Ownership was transferred to the state of Delaware in the mid-20th century. Lums Pond State Park was opened to the public in 1963. Lum's Mill House was added to the National Register of Historic Places in 1973. In June 2013, a Go Ape tree-top adventure course was added to the park.

== Recreation ==
Lums Pond is open to boating and fishing, with rowboats, sailboats, kayaks, canoes, and pedalos available to rent. Lums Pond is a freshwater fishery with the common game fish being carp, pickerel, crappie, catfish, and largemouth bass and hybrid striped bass. The hybrid striped bass are stocked by the Fish and Wildlife Division of the Delaware Department of Natural Resources and Environmental Control. The other game fish are native species.

Park facilities include fields for football, cricket, soccer, baseball, and softball, courts for basketball, volleyball and tennis, horseshoe pits, disc golf course, camping, hiking, cross-country skiing, the Summit North Marina located on the Chesapeake and Delaware Canal, and the Whale Wallow Nature Center.
