= Point Farm =

Historic house in Delaware, United States

- U.S. National Register of Historic Places
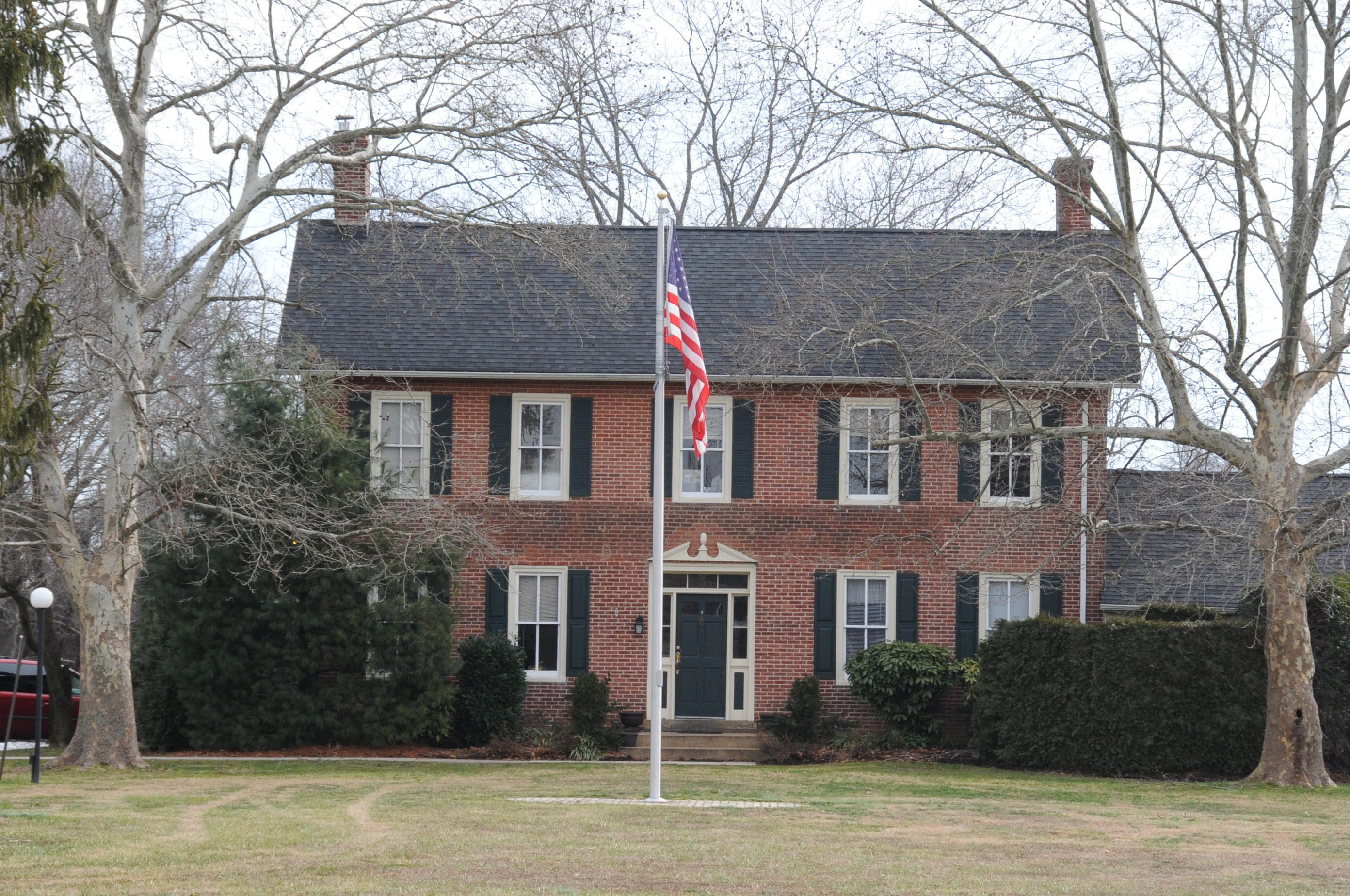

- Location within Delaware Location within the United States
- Location: 2950 Red Lion Road, Kirkwood, Delaware
- Coordinates: 39.55504°N 75.70240°W
- Area: 2.9 acres (1.2 ha)
- Built: 1846
- Architectural style: Greek Revival, Other, Peach Mansion
- MPS: Red Lion Hundred MRA
- NRHP reference No.: 82002331
- Added to NRHP: April 8, 1982

Point Farm, also known as the R. T. Cann House, is a historic home located at Kirkwood, New Castle County, Delaware. It was built in 1846, and is a two-story, five-bay L-shaped, brick dwelling with a gable roof. It the rear is a three-bay gable-roofed wing. The house is in the Greek Revival style in the "Peach Mansion" form.

It was added to the National Register of Historic Places in 1982.
