= Correll's Farm and Lawn Supply =

- U.S. National Register of Historic Places
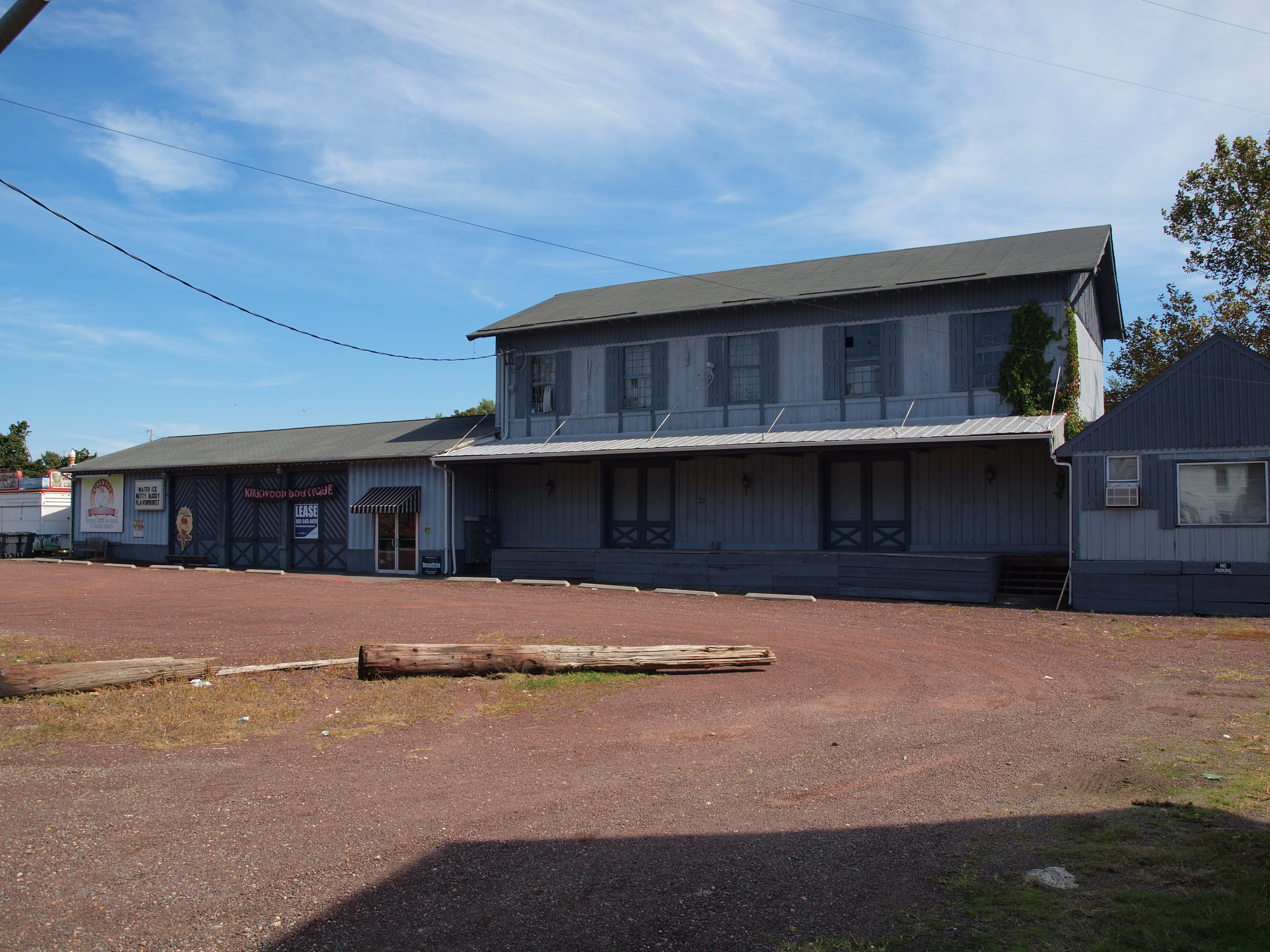

- Location within Delaware Location within the United States
- Location: 2440 Red Lion Road, Kirkwood, Delaware
- Coordinates: 39.570542°N 75.697168°W
- Area: less than one acre
- Built: 1885
- Built by: Delaware Railroad
- MPS: Red Lion Hundred MRA
- NRHP reference No.: 82002327
- Added to NRHP: April 8, 1982

Correll's Farm and Lawn Supply is a historic commercial building located at Kirkwood, New Castle County, Delaware. It was built about 1885, and is a two-story, braced frame board-and-batten commercial building with a low gable roof. There is an attached one-story metal shed. It was originally built as a freight storage depot of the Delaware Railroad.

It was added to the National Register of Historic Places in 1982.
