= Dragon Run Farm =

- U.S. National Register of Historic Places
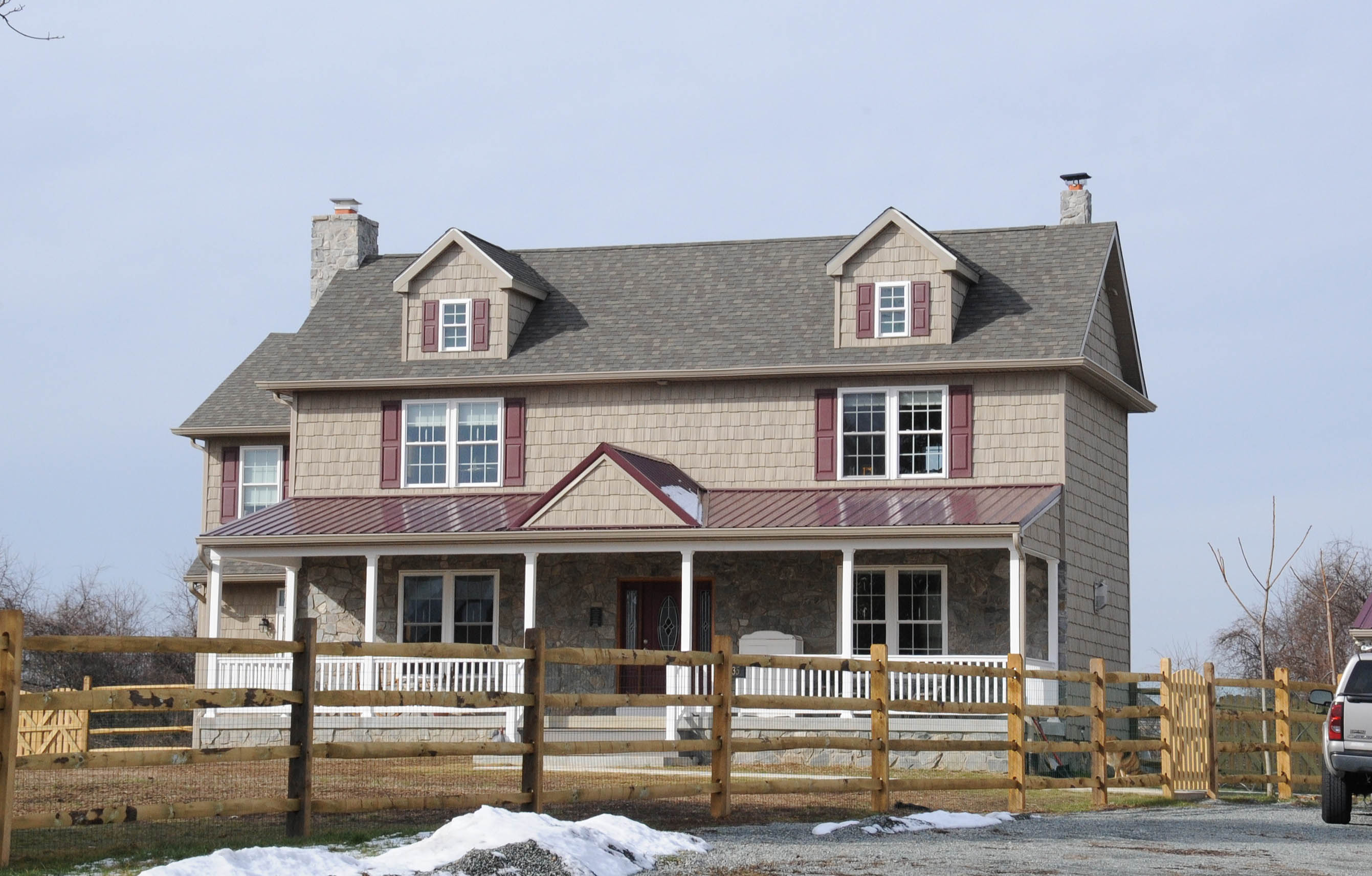

- Location within Delaware Location within the United States
- Location: 2335 McCoy Rd., Kirkwood, Delaware
- Coordinates: 39.562978°N 75.673118°W
- Area: 6 acres (2.4 ha)
- Built: c. 1845
- MPS: Red Lion Hundred MRA
- NRHP reference No.: 82002328
- Added to NRHP: April 8, 1982

Dragon Run Farm is a historic farm located at Kirkwood, New Castle County, Delaware, United States. The property includes three contributing buildings. They are a frame house (c. 1845), a large frame barn, and a wooden shed. The house is a two-story, L-shaped, five bay gable-roofed dwelling.

It was added to the National Register of Historic Places in 1982.

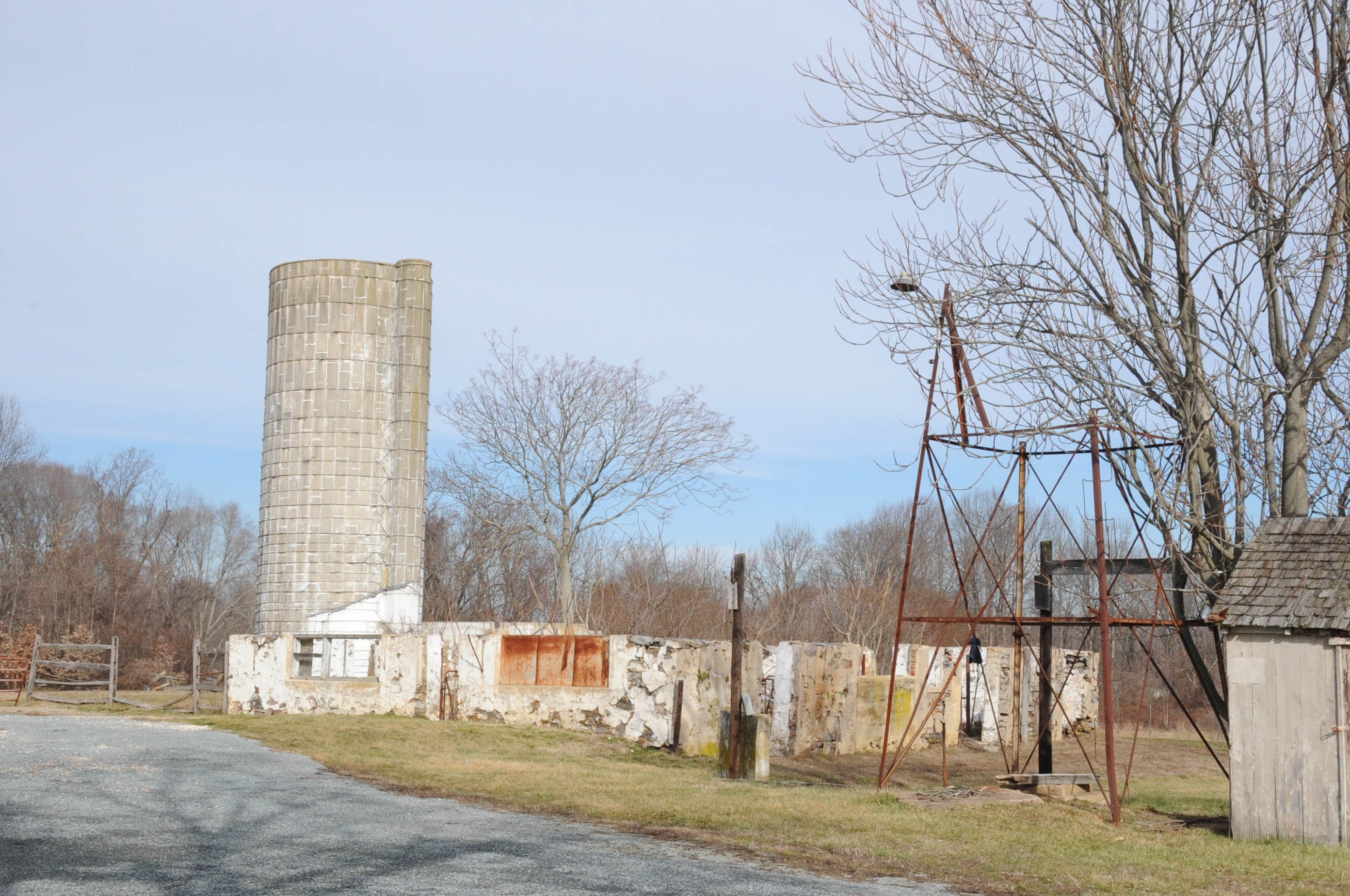
Ruins of the barn
