= Kirkwood, Delaware =

Unincorporated community in Delaware, United States

- Unincorporated community
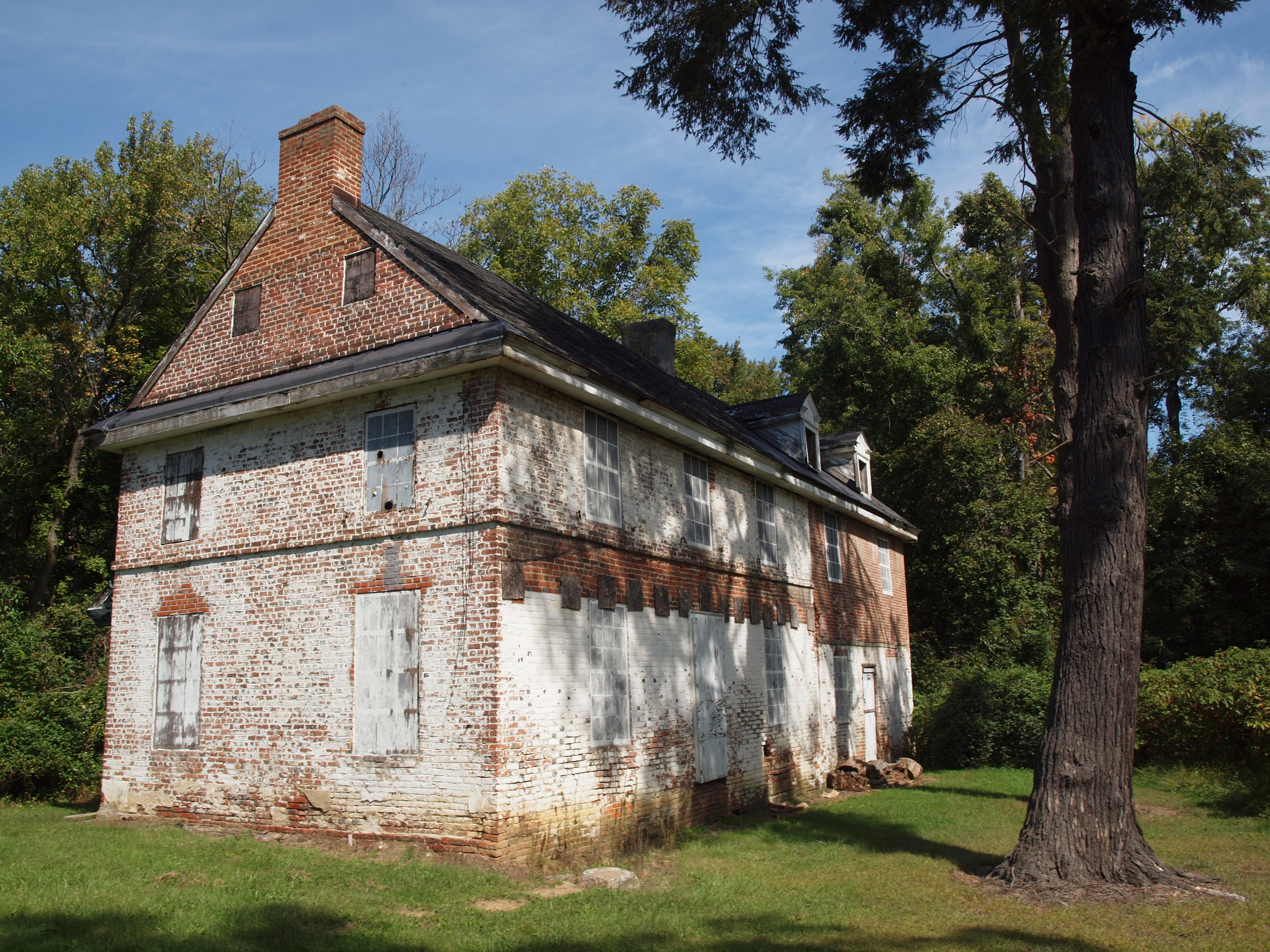
- Lum's Mill House

- Location within the state of Delaware Kirkwood, Delaware (the United States)
- Coordinates: 39°34′18″N 75°41′47″W
- Country: United States
- State: Delaware
- County: New Castle
- Elevation: 69 ft (21 m)
- Time zone: UTC-5 (Eastern (EST))
  - Summer (DST): UTC-4 (EDT)
- ZIP codes: 19708
- Area code: 302
- GNIS feature ID: 216131

Kirkwood (also known as Kemps Corner or Saint Georges Station) is an unincorporated community in central New Castle County, Delaware, United States. It lies along Delaware Route 71, southwest of the city of Wilmington, the county seat of New Castle County. Its elevation is 69 feet (21 m). It has a post office with the ZIP code 19708.

Kirkwood was named for Robert Kirkwood, a soldier who fought in the American Revolutionary War.

Correll's Farm and Lawn Supply, Dragon Run Farm, Lum's Mill House, McCoy House, Old Cann Mansion House, Old Post Office, and Point Farm are listed on the National Register of Historic Places.

== Education ==
Previously Kirkwood was in the New Castle-Gunning Bedford School District.
