= Dahmer, West Virginia =

Unincorporated community in West Virginia, United States

Dahmer
- Unincorporated community
- Motto: "Loafers Glory"
- Location within the state of West Virginia Dahmer (the United States)
- Coordinates: 38°34′10″N 79°19′35″W
- Country: United States
- State: West Virginia
- County: Pendleton
- Time zone: UTC-5 (Eastern (EST))
  - Summer (DST): UTC-4 (EDT)
- GNIS feature ID: 1550866

Dahmer is an unincorporated community located in Pendleton County, West Virginia, United States. Established in 1896, Dahmer is the only place in the United States bearing this name. Its post office was discontinued December 1, 1941.

The community is so named for John G. Dahmer, a late 19th-century resident, and first Postmaster. His son also became the school teacher for three generations of children at the local Dahmer school. His grandson, Johnny Arvin Dahmer became a noted local historian for the county, and wrote "The Dahmer Letter", a weekly article in the Pendleton Times highlighting news, local history, folklore, and activities taking place in the Dahmer community between 1968 and 1982. The "Dahmer Letters" were compiled by David Kuykendall and published as a book in 2002. Dahmer is also home to the historic Ananais Pitsenbarger Farm.
