= Priest Mill =

- U.S. National Register of Historic Places
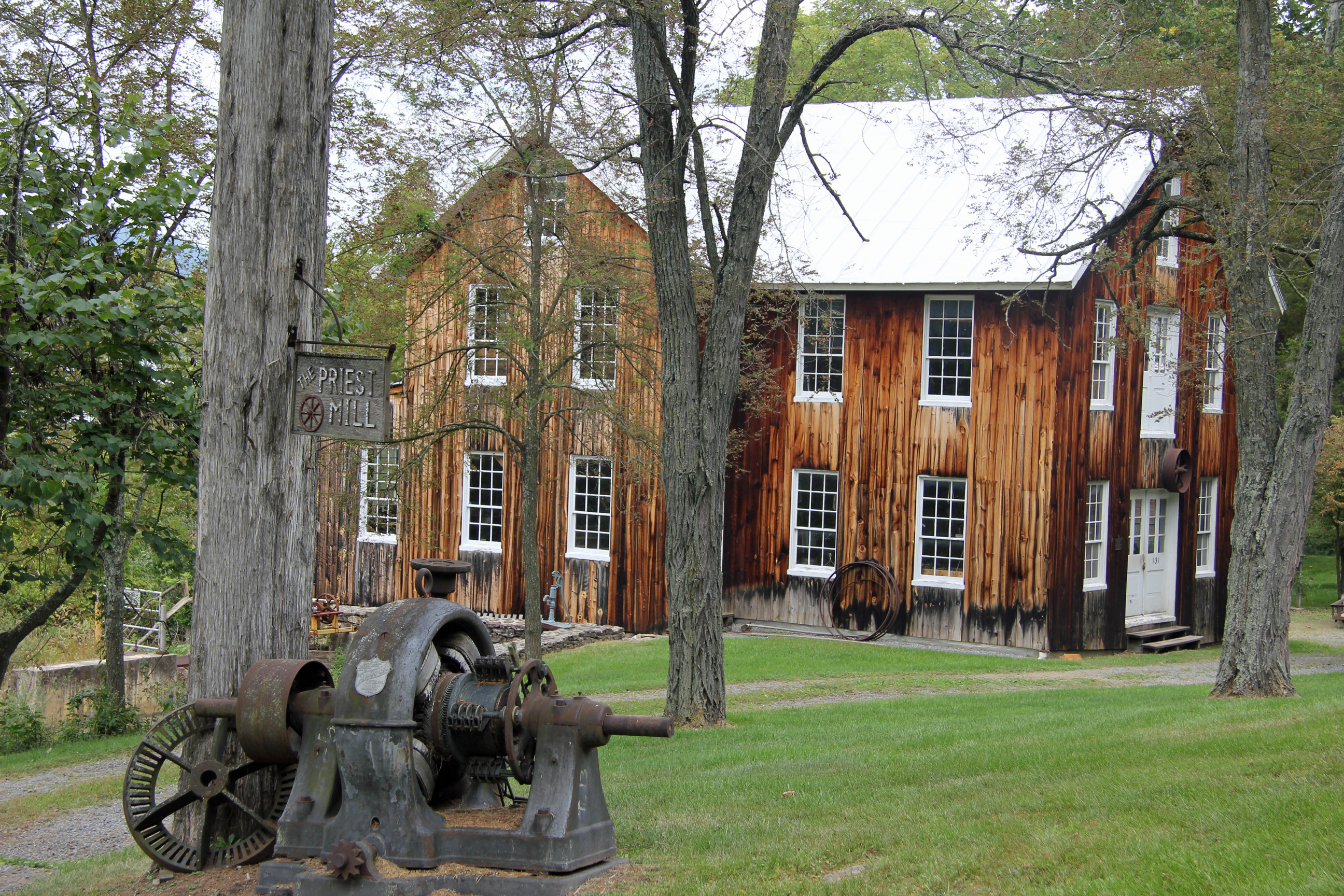

- Location within West Virginia Location within the United States
- Location: Off US 220, near Low-Water Bridge, near Franklin, West Virginia
- Coordinates: 38°38′22″N 79°19′50″W
- Area: 2.9 acres (1.2 ha)
- Built: 1900
- Architect: Priest, Samuel B.
- NRHP reference No.: 00000250
- Added to NRHP: April 4, 2000

Priest Mill is a historic sawmill and early electric power plant located near Franklin, Pendleton County, West Virginia. It was built in 1900, with an addition built in 1916 to house a generator and hydro-electric power plant. Electric power was generated at the mill starting in 1911, and in 1913, the Priest's home became the first in Pendleton County to have electric lights. It replaced a mill that was destroyed by fire in 1899. It is a three-story, T-shaped, unadorned wooden structure. Originally covered with wood shingles, the roof was later replaced with metal. The mill race measures 988 feet from the headgates at the dam to the entrance under the mill. It operated as a wool carding mill until the 1950s, and reopened in the 1980s.

It was listed on the National Register of Historic Places in 2000.
