= McCoy House (Kirkwood, Delaware) =

Historic house in Delaware, United States

- U.S. National Register of Historic Places
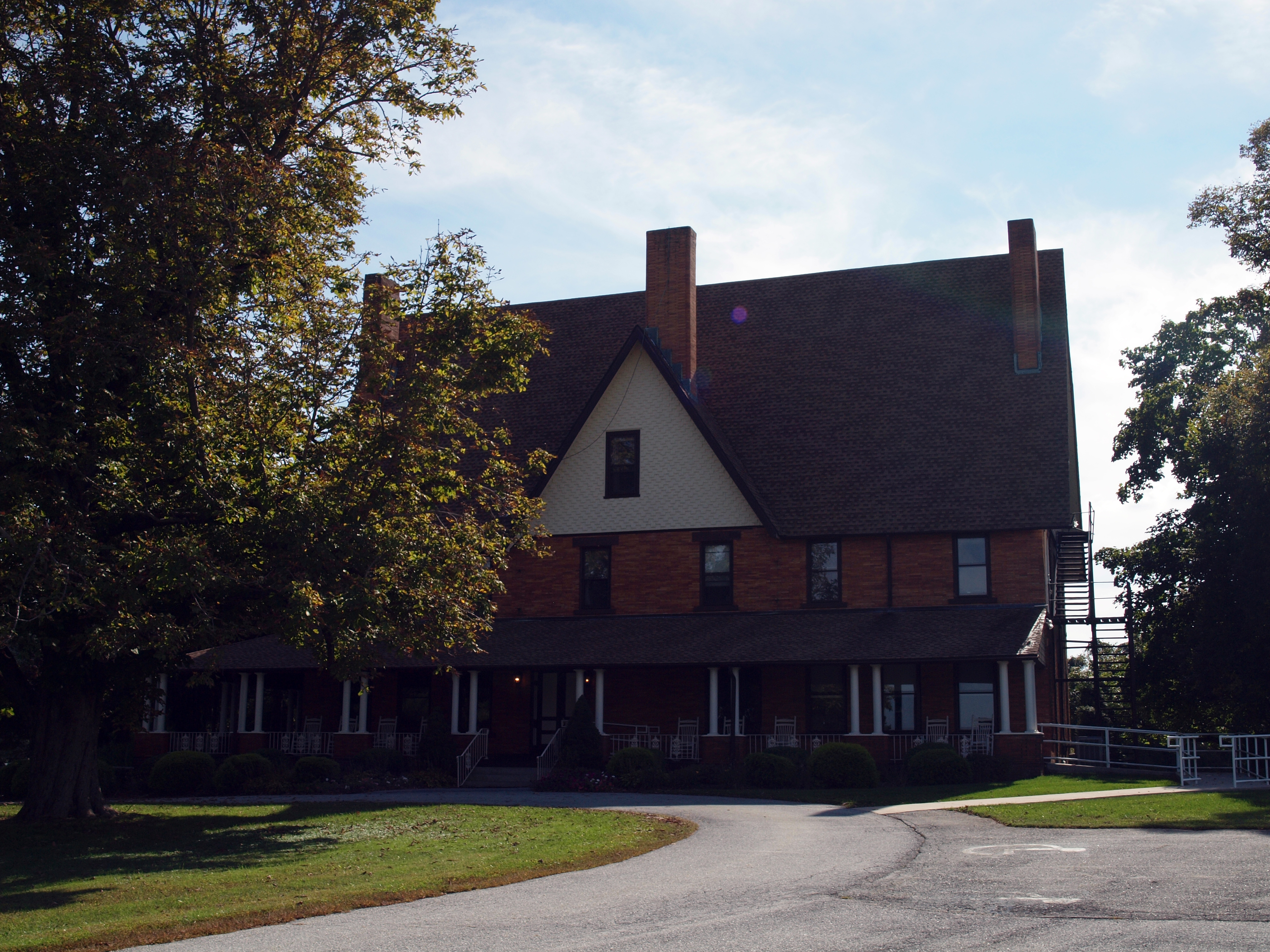

- Location within Delaware Location within the United States
- Location: 4185 Kirkwood St. Georges Rd., Kirkwood, Delaware
- Coordinates: 39.55996°N 75.67692°W
- Area: 10 acres (4.0 ha)
- Built: 1892–1897
- Architect: Dr. John Cresap McCoy
- Architectural style: Bungalow/craftsman, English Arts and Crafts
- NRHP reference No.: 73000512
- Added to NRHP: April 24, 1973

McCoy House, also known as the AuClaire School and Gingerbread House, is a historic home located at Kirkwood, New Castle County, Delaware. It was built between 1892 and 1897, and is a 28-room, 2 1/2-story, six-bay, brick house. It features a wraparound verandah, steep gable roof, and is covered in brown glazed tiles imported from Belgium. It is considered one of the most unusual structures in the State of Delaware and reflects the builder's unique expression of the European Arts and Crafts movement.

It was added to the National Register of Historic Places in 1973.
