= Benjamin McCoy House =

Historic house in South Carolina, United States

- U.S. National Register of Historic Places
- Location within South Carolina Location within the United States
- Location: South of Cassatt on South Carolina Highway 15, near Cassatt, South Carolina
- Coordinates: 34°19′39″N 80°25′59″W
- Area: 1 acre (0.40 ha)
- Built: c. 1820
- NRHP reference No.: 80003674
- Added to NRHP: August 7, 1980

Benjamin McCoy House, also known as Banbury Cross, is a historic home located near Cassatt, Kershaw County, South Carolina. It was built about 1820, and is a two-story I-house. It has heavy timber-frame construction and brick exterior brick chimneys.

It was listed on the National Register of Historic Places in 1980.
