= Franklin, West Virginia =

- Town
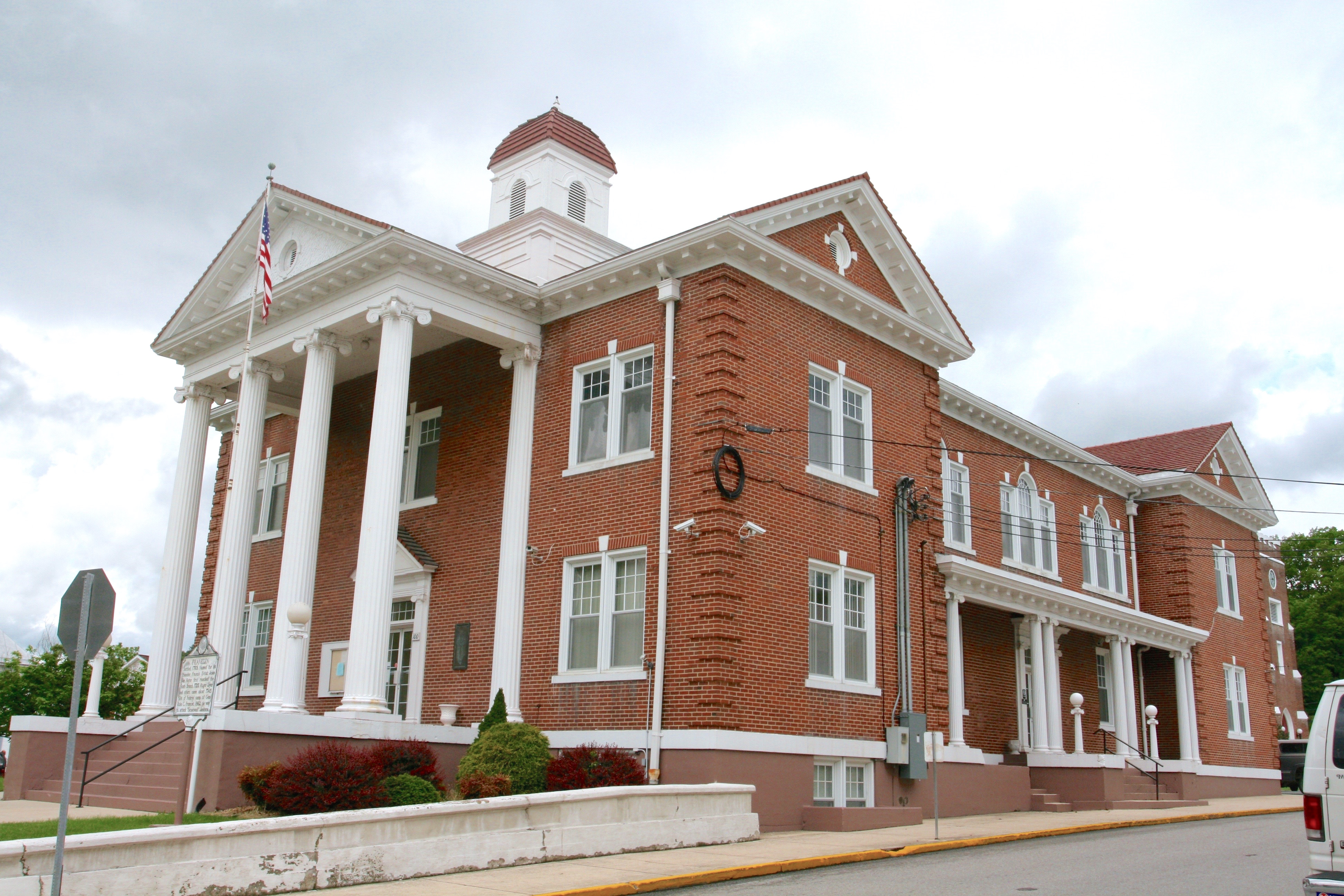
- Pendleton County Courthouse in Franklin

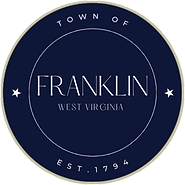
- Seal
- Nickname: F-Town
- Interactive map of Franklin, West Virginia
- Location within West Virginia Location within the United States
- Coordinates: 38°38′51″N 79°19′54″W
- Country: United States
- State: West Virginia
- County: Pendleton
- Chartered: 1794

Area
  - Total: 0.56 sq mi (1.46 km^{2})
  - Land: 0.56 sq mi (1.46 km^{2})
  - Water: 0 sq mi (0.00 km^{2})
- Elevation: 1,732 ft (528 m)

Population (2020)
  - Total: 495
  - Estimate (2021): 482
  - Density: 1,142.0/sq mi (440.93/km^{2})
- Time zone: UTC-5 (Eastern (EST))
  - Summer (DST): UTC-4 (EDT)
- ZIP code: 26807
- Area code: 304
- FIPS code: 54-29044
- GNIS feature ID: 1551175
- Website: https://www.townfranklinwv.com/

Franklin is a town in and the county seat of Pendleton County, West Virginia, United States. The population was 486 at the 2020 census. Franklin was established in 1794 and named for Francis Evick, an early settler.

== History ==
The Town of Franklin is situated in the Allegheny Mountains on the eastern edge of the Monongahela National Forest and along the South Branch of the Potomac River. This region was populated by Native American cultures for centuries prior to the arrival of English immigrants in the mid-18th century. During the French and Indian War, conflict between the early settlers and Native American populations included two battles at frontier fortifications at Upper Tract and Fort Seybert in 1758, both ten miles distant from the future location of Franklin. The land on which Franklin was laid out was first patented by brothers Francis and George Evick in 1769.

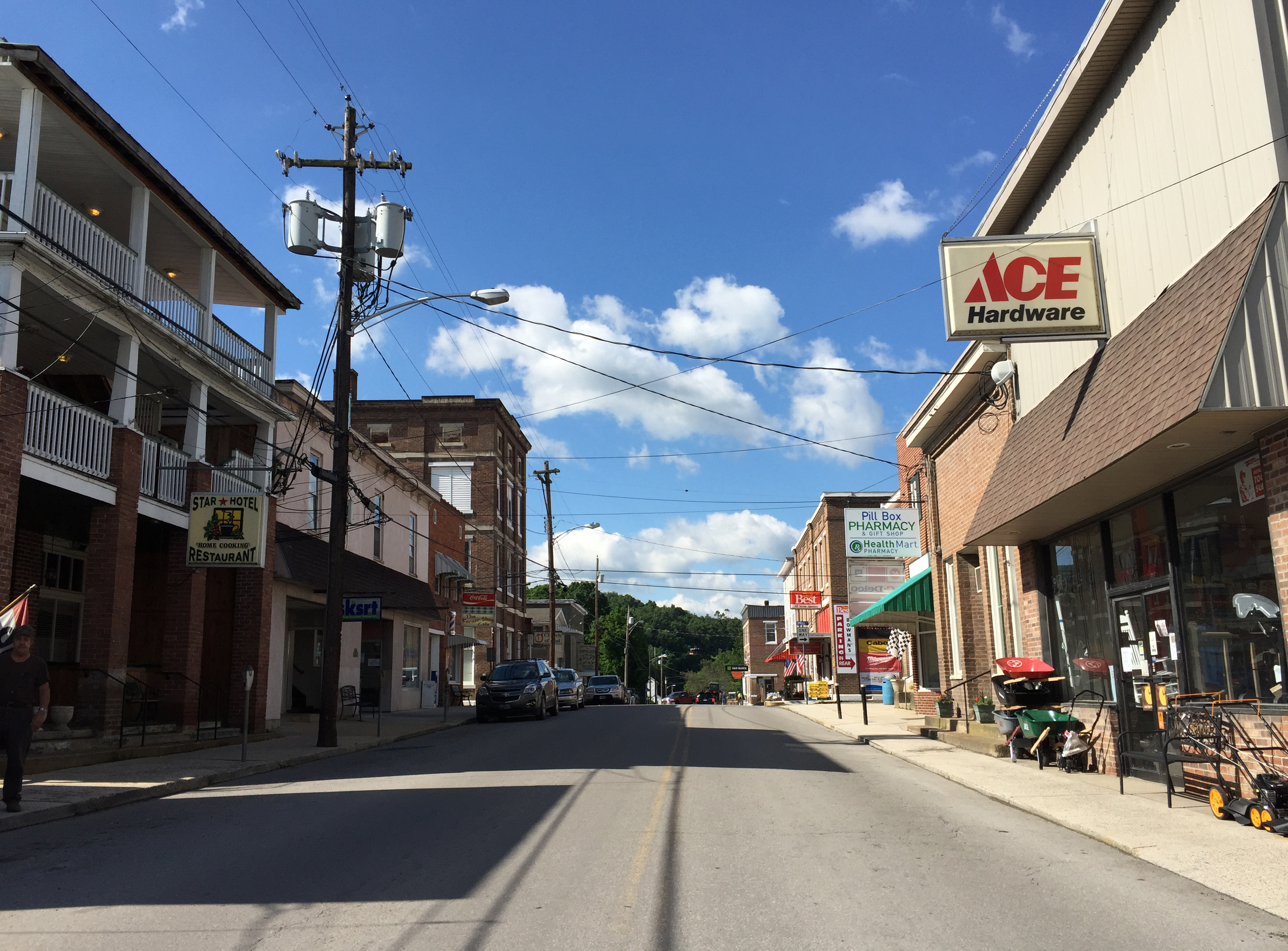
Main Street in downtown Franklin

Pendleton County was divided from parts of Augusta, Hardy, and Rockingham Counties (Virginia) by an act of the Virginia General Assembly in 1787. The earliest court sessions in the new county were held at the home of Captain Zeruiah Stratton near the present-day village of Ruddle until Francis Evick offered a part of his land to become a county seat around 1789. Additional lots were divided off of Evick's land to form the new town. On December 19, 1794, the Virginia General Assembly chartered the town of Franklin and recognized it as the seat of Pendleton County. Franklin grew steadily over the first half of the 19th century, becoming a local center of commerce and industry. In 1834, there were two stores, two tanneries, three saddlers, two carpenters, two shoemakers, two blacksmiths, one gunsmith, one tailor, one hat-maker, and one cabinet-maker listed among the town's residents.

At the outbreak of the American Civil War in 1861, Pendleton County voted to uphold Virginia's Ordinance of Secession, despite strong Union sympathies from many of its residents. Localized fighting occurred between northern and southern regiments throughout the war, but the only major battle to impact the Franklin area occurred in May 1862. Following the First Battle of Kernstown, Confederate Major General Thomas J. "Stonewall" Jackson initiated his Valley Campaign to draw attention of the Union Army away from its Peninsula Campaign nearing the Confederate capitol at Richmond. On May 8, 1862, Jackson clashed with Union regiments from West Virginia and Ohio under the command of Brigadier General Robert H. Milroy at the Battle of McDowell (some 30 miles from Franklin). After a day of fighting, the Union forces withdrew from the battle and began retreating towards Franklin, pursued by Jackson for nearly a week. The armies clashed briefly at McCoy's Mill (three miles south of Franklin, now a National Historic Site), but Jackson withdrew and returned to the Shenandoah Valley to continue his campaign.

Franklin did not grow significantly in the years following the American Civil War until the early twentieth century. In 1917, the town's boundaries were expanded, the streets were macadamized, and public water and electricity were brought into the town. However, tragedy struck on April 17, 1924, when a massive fire destroyed the entire business district and caused $500,000.00 (~$6.5 million adjusted for present inflation) in damages. Most of the town's center, its commercial district, and the Pendleton County Courthouse were constructed following the 1924 fire. Another disaster struck the town in 1985. The South Branch of the Potomac River in Franklin crested at 22.6 feet during the 1985 Election day floods. Flood stage at the time in the shallow riverbed was only 7 feet.

Route 108 which previously served Franklin was discontinued on June 3, 2024. The current 108 runs between Short Gap, WV and Keyser, WV.

== Geography ==
Franklin is located at 38°38′51″N 79°19′54″W (38.647400, -79.331557).

According to the United States Census Bureau, the town has a total area of 0.56 square miles (1.45 km^{2}), all land.

=== Climate ===
The climate in this area has mild differences between highs and lows, and there is adequate rainfall year-round.

Climate data for Franklin, WV (1991-2020 normals, coordinates:38.6756°N 79.3092°W
Month	Jan	Feb	Mar	Apr	May	Jun	Jul	Aug	Sep	Oct	Nov	Dec	Year
Mean daily maximum °F (°C)	43.3 (6.3)	46.6 (8.1)	55.3 (12.9)	66.8 (19.3)	74.1 (23.4)	81.1 (27.3)	84.3 (29.1)	82.7 (28.2)	76.8 (24.9)	67.7 (19.8)	55.7 (13.2)	46.4 (8.0)	65.1 (18.4)
Daily mean °F (°C)	32.5 (0.3)	34.6 (1.4)	42.6 (5.9)	52.4 (11.3)	60.9 (16.1)	68.1 (20.1)	71.8 (22.1)	70.4 (21.3)	64.1 (17.8)	54.2 (12.3)	43.7 (6.5)	35.8 (2.1)	52.6 (11.4)
Mean daily minimum °F (°C)	21.8 (−5.7)	22.7 (−5.2)	29.9 (−1.2)	38.0 (3.3)	47.7 (8.7)	55.2 (12.9)	59.3 (15.2)	58.1 (14.5)	51.4 (10.8)	40.7 (4.8)	31.6 (−0.2)	25.1 (−3.8)	40.1 (4.5)
Average precipitation inches (mm)	2.47 (63)	2.06 (52)	3.22 (82)	3.36 (85)	4.22 (107)	3.44 (87)	4.84 (123)	3.54 (90)	3.84 (98)	2.55 (65)	2.36 (60)	2.56 (65)	38.46 (977)
Average snowfall inches (cm)	8.1 (21)	8.1 (21)	3.5 (8.9)	0.0 (0.0)	0.0 (0.0)	0.0 (0.0)	0.0 (0.0)	0.0 (0.0)	0.0 (0.0)	0.0 (0.0)	1.2 (3.0)	5.8 (15)	26.7 (68.9)
Average precipitation days (≥ 0.01 in)	8.6	7.3	10.4	10.2	12.6	10.6	10.5	9.4	8.4	6.2	7.5	8.8	110.5
Average snowy days (≥ 0.01 in)	2.1	2.6	1.5	0	0	0	0	0	0	0	0.5	1.9	8.6

== Attractions ==
Aside from its historical sites, Franklin and Pendleton County are home to several recreational facilities. Franklin Gorge is a popular rock climbing destination. Franklin is within short distance of several of West Virginia's most celebrated state and national parks, including Seneca Rocks, Spruce Knob, and Smoke Hole Canyon.

== Demographics ==
Historical population
Census	Pop.	Note	%±
1880	273		—
1900	205		—
1910	200		−2.4%
1920	320		60.0%
1930	431		34.7%
1940	613		42.2%
1950	777		26.8%
1960	758		−2.4%
1970	695		−8.3%
1980	780		12.2%
1990	914		17.2%
2000	797		−12.8%
2010	721		−9.5%
2020	495		−31.3%
2021 (est.)	482	▼	−2.6%
U.S. Decennial Census

=== 2010 census ===
As of the census of 2010, there were 721 people, 313 households, and 173 families living in the town. The population density was 1,287.5 inhabitants per square mile (497.1/km^{2}). There were 398 housing units at an average density of 710.7 per square mile (274.4/km^{2}). The racial makeup of the town was 96.5% White, 1.0% African American, 0.6% Native American, 0.4% Asian, 0.4% from other races, and 1.1% from two or more races. Hispanic or Latino of any race were 0.7% of the population.

There were 313 households, of which 18.5% had children under the age of 18 living with them, 44.4% were married couples living together, 7.3% had a female householder with no husband present, 3.5% had a male householder with no wife present, and 44.7% were non-families. 40.9% of all households were made up of individuals, and 22.7% had someone living alone who was 65 years of age or older. The average household size was 2.00 and the average family size was 2.68.

The median age in the town was 55.5 years. 14.4% of residents were under the age of 18; 5.1% were between the ages of 18 and 24; 16% were from 25 to 44; 28.4% were from 45 to 64; and 36.2% were 65 years of age or older. The gender makeup of the town was 44.2% male and 55.8% female.

=== 2000 census ===
As of the census of 2000, there were 797 people, 362 households, and 222 families living in the town. The population density was 1,582.0 inhabitants per square mile (615.4/km^{2}). There were 424 housing units at an average density of 841.6 per square mile (327.4/km^{2}). The racial makeup of the town was 97.11% White, 2.01% African American, 0.25% Native American, .13% from other races, and 0.50% from two or more races. Hispanic or Latino of any race were 0.38% of the population.

There were 362 households, out of which 24.3% had children under the age of 18 living with them, 50.6% were married couples living together, 8.3% had a female householder with no husband present, and 38.4% were non-families. 35.1% of all households were made up of individuals, and 18.0% had someone living alone who was 65 years of age or older. The average household size was 2.17 and the average family size was 2.80.

In the town, the population was spread out, with 20.7% under the age of 18, 5.9% from 18 to 24, 23.8% from 25 to 44, 25.6% from 45 to 64, and 24.0% who were 65 years of age or older. The median age was 44 years. For every 100 females, there were 82.0 males. For every 100 females age 18 and over, there were 79.5 males.

The median income for a household in the town was $32,125, and the median income for a family was $40,500. Males had a median income of $23,839 versus $18,056 for females. The per capita income for the town was $15,609. About 6.0% of families and 11.1% of the population were below the poverty line, including 19.3% of those under age 18 and 6.0% of those age 65 or over.

== Arts and culture ==
=== Festivals ===
The most popular festivals in Franklin are the Treasure Mountain Festival, which takes place annually the third weekend in September, and the annual Trout Fest in May. Both attract visitors from surrounding counties and states.

=== Historic sites ===
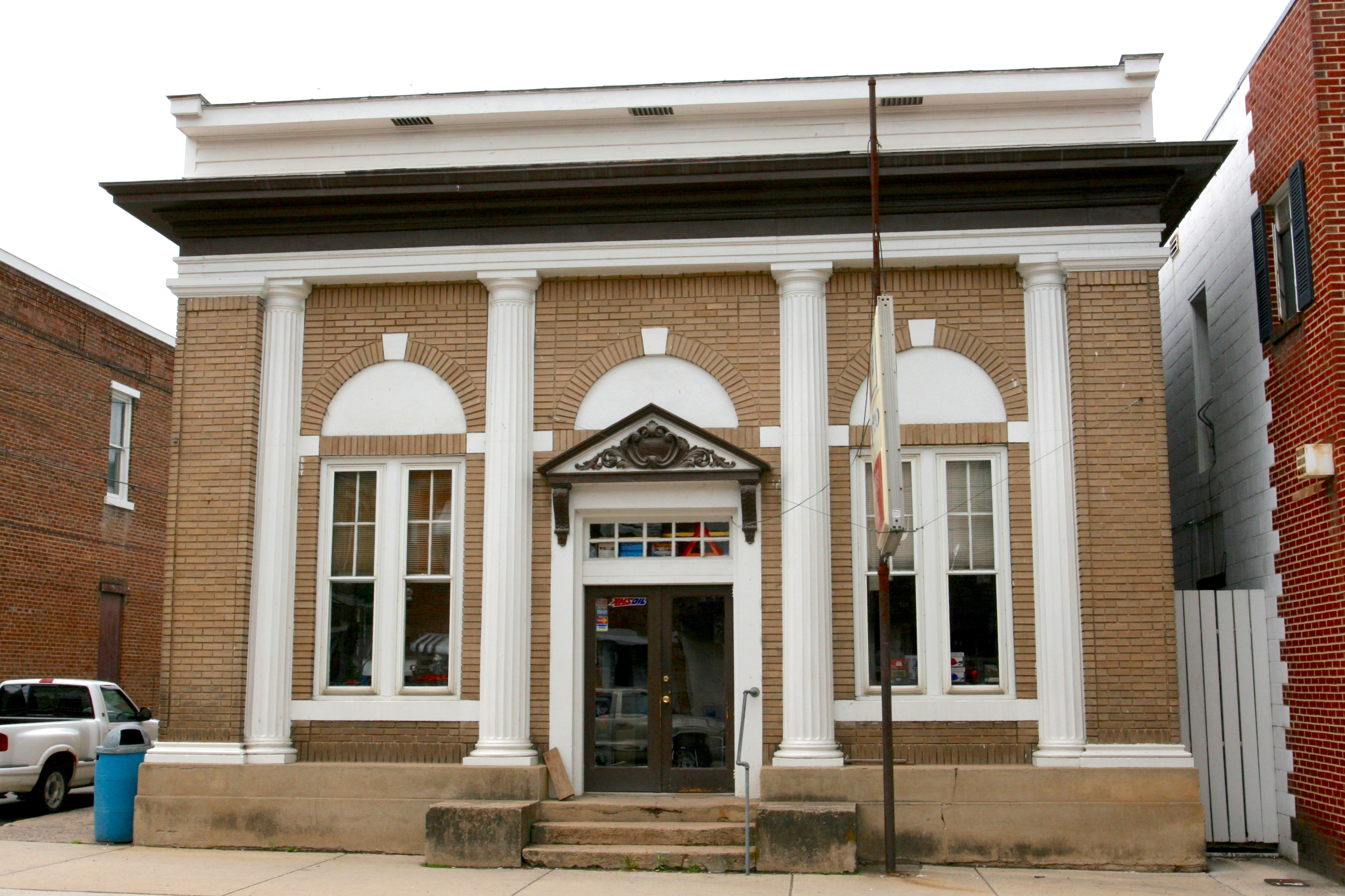
Bank of Franklin

Much of the town was listed on the National Register of Historic Places as the Franklin Historic District in 1986.

- Bank of Franklin (1925) Situated at the center of Franklin's commercial district, the Bank of Franklin building was constructed following the fire of 1924 to house one of Franklin's two banking institutions. The new building, constructed of brick, was designed in Neoclassical style inspired by the Beaux-Arts movement. The bank was closed after the passage of the Emergency Banking Act in 1933, along with the other two banks in Pendleton County.
- Dr. Preston Boggs House (1900) Located on North Main Street, the Dr. Preston Boggs House was constructed around 1900 in an elaborate interpretation of Queen Anne Style. The house features an octagonal turret positioned on its northeast corner and multiple bay window projections. A wraparound porch on the first floor is surmounted by a smaller porch on the second floor centered on the front facade of the house.

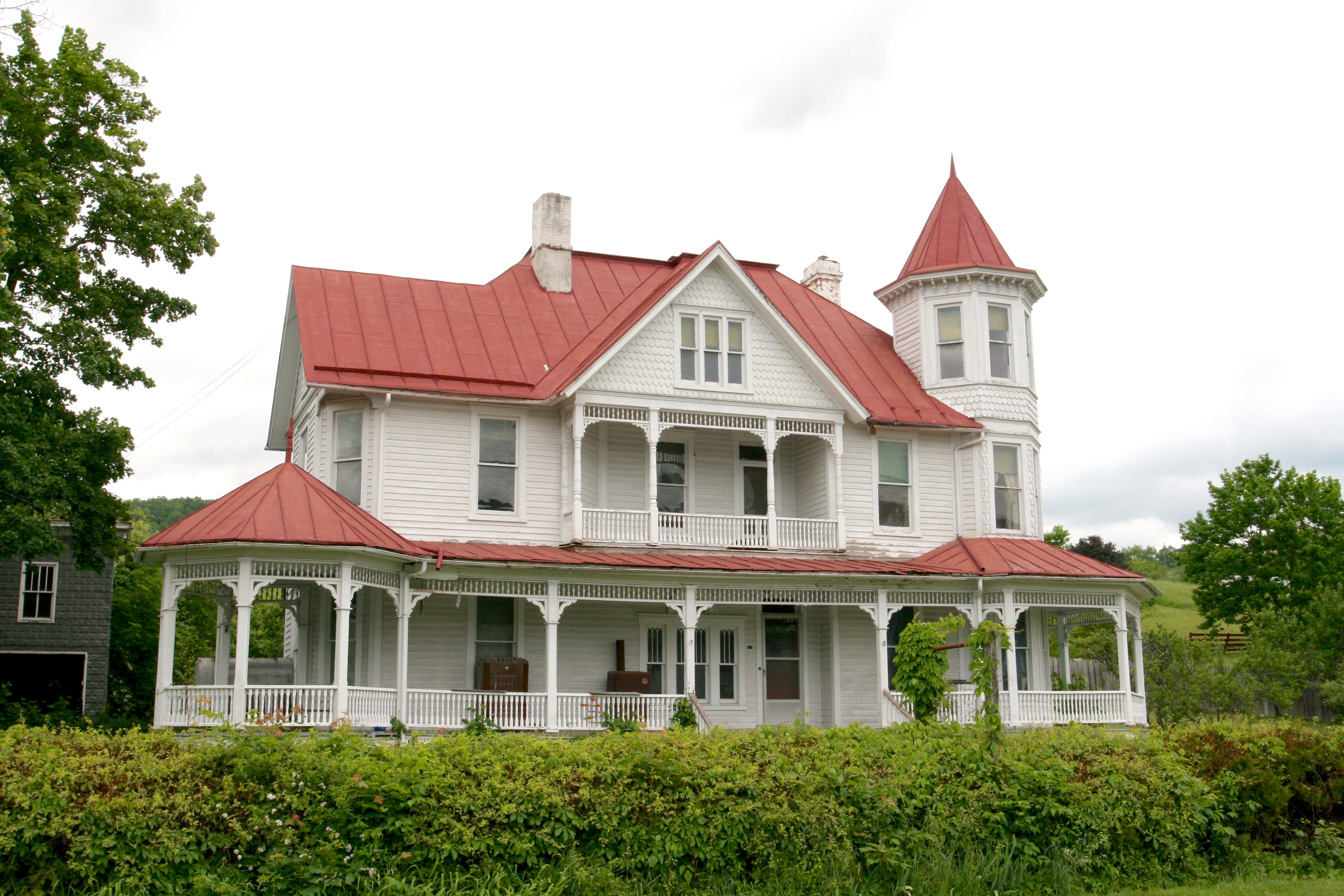
Dr. Preston Boggs House

- Ernest Bowman House (1900) Neighboring the Dr. Preston Boggs House, the Ernest Bowman House is situated at the corner of Main Street and Dogwood Drive. Erected around 1900, the Ernest Bowman House also displays Queen Anne Style with projecting bays and ornate porches. The south facade of the house features a unique second story porch positioned overtop a bay window on the first floor.
- Franklin Presbyterian Church (1922) The Presbyterian Church at Franklin was organized August 19, 1866, near the village of Upper Tract. The congregation first moved to Franklin in 1876 and erected a church across the street from the present edifice (today the Walnut Street United Methodist Church). Construction of the present structure began in 1918 but was delayed due to an influenza outbreak and was still partially completed when the fire of 1924 destroyed Franklin's commercial district (though leaving the new church untouched). The congregation sold its old building to the county for use as a temporary courthouse in 1924 and occupied the present building, which was designed by Stanholpe Johnson of Lexington, Virginia. The Franklin Presbyterian Church is an example of Gothic Revival style.

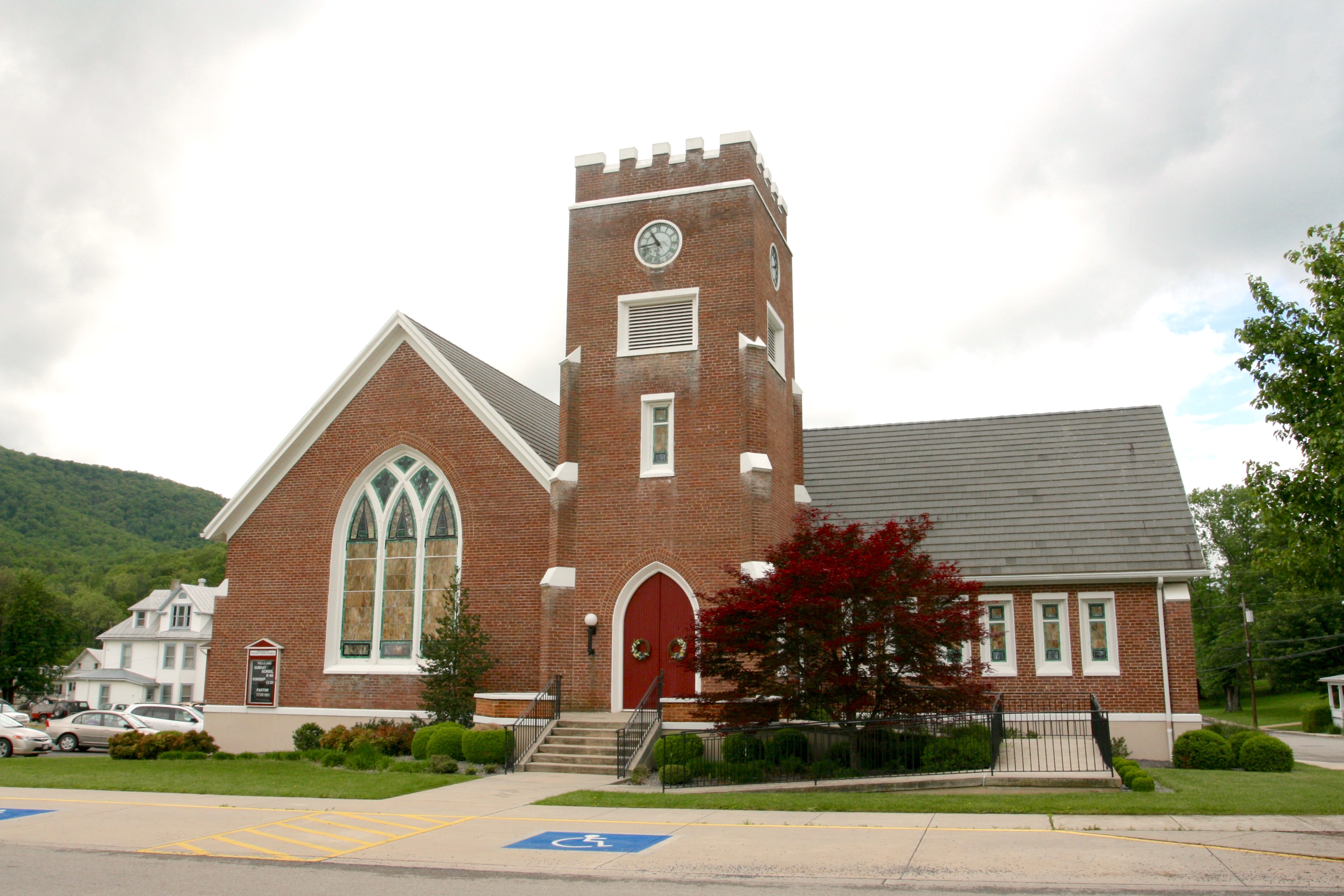
Franklin Presbyterian Church

- Franklin United Methodist Church (1881) Methodism in Pendleton County originated with the arrival of Rev. Ferdinand Lair in 1800. The congregation worshipped in Franklin's Union Church from 1809 until the construction of the present church in 1881, designed by H.H. Smally of Lilly, Virginia. Constructed of brick, Franklin United Methodist Church displays elements of Gothic Revival and Italianate design.
- McCoy House (1848) Located on Main Street opposite the Pendleton County Courthouse, the McCoy House was listed on the National Register of Historic Places in 1996. Built by slave labor in 1848, the house was constructed for William McCoy, who served at various times as deputy sheriff of Pendleton County, a justice of the county court, and represented Pendleton County in the state legislature. The McCoy House is a two-story, brick "I-House" designed in Greek Revival Style with an Ionic portico.

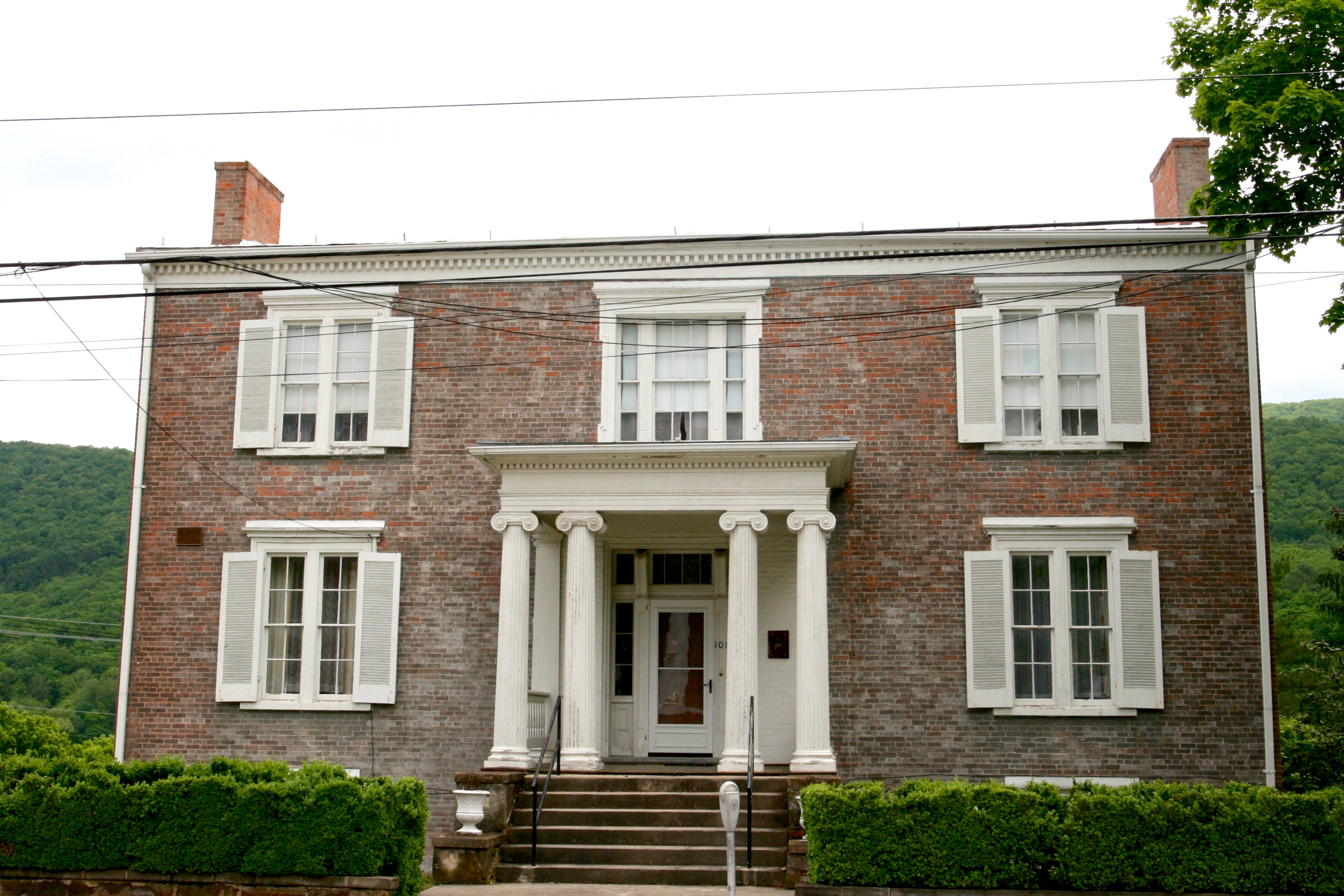
McCoy House

- Johnson House and Drug Store (1878) Located on Main Street catty-corner to the present courthouse. The property housed the Johnson family until the 1980s who operated a drug store and lived on-site in the brick structure. Much like the neighboring McCoy house, this structure is a brick "I-House" in a more Victorian style.
- Pendleton County Courthouse (1925) Franklin was the site of three courthouses prior to the present edifice. A log structure was built in 1788 by Thomas Collett, which served the county for 28 years until a brick courthouse was built in 1816–17. A third, larger courthouse was erected in 1889 by Franklin resident John Add Crigler, which was destroyed by the fire of 1924. The court convened in the old Presbyterian Church (today the Walnut Street United Methodist Church) until the present, fourth courthouse was completed in 1925. Designed by the Snyder Brothers of Keyser, West Virginia, the new courthouse cost $62,577.00 to erect. The Pendleton County Courthouse is an example of Colonial Revival Style.
- The Ananias Pitsenbarger Farm was listed on the National Register of Historic Places in 2011. The Priest Mill was listed on the National Register of Historic Places in 2000.

== Transportation ==
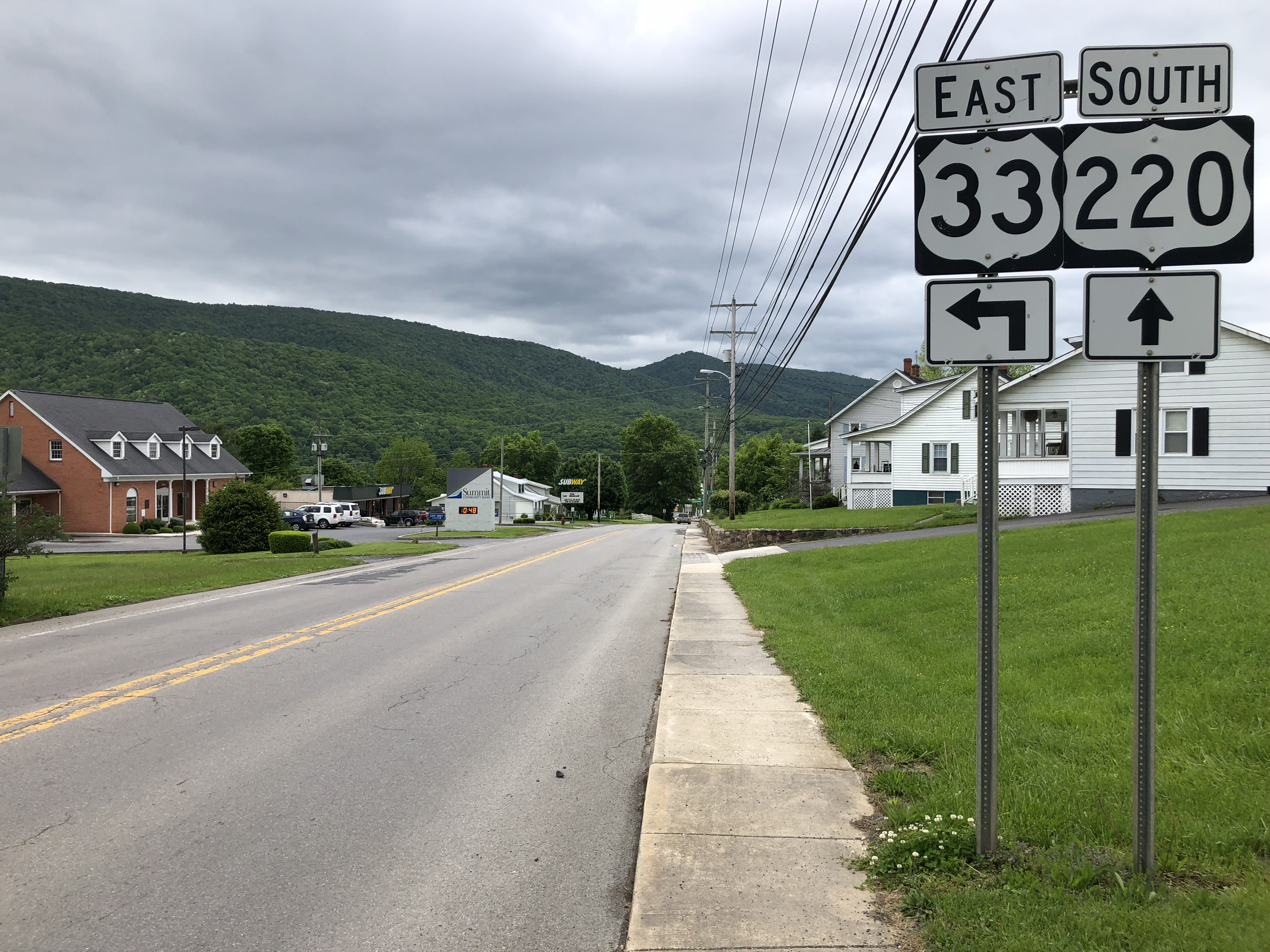
US 33 eastbound and US 220 southbound in Franklin

=== Roadways ===
Transport to and from Franklin is primarily via two-lane rural mountain roads. U.S. Route 33 is the main east–west road through Franklin, while U.S. Route 220 is the primary north–south highway traversing the town. Both roads run concurrently for a short segment on the north side of the town.
