= Albert McCoy Farm =

Historic house in North Carolina, United States

- U.S. National Register of Historic Places
- U.S. Historic district
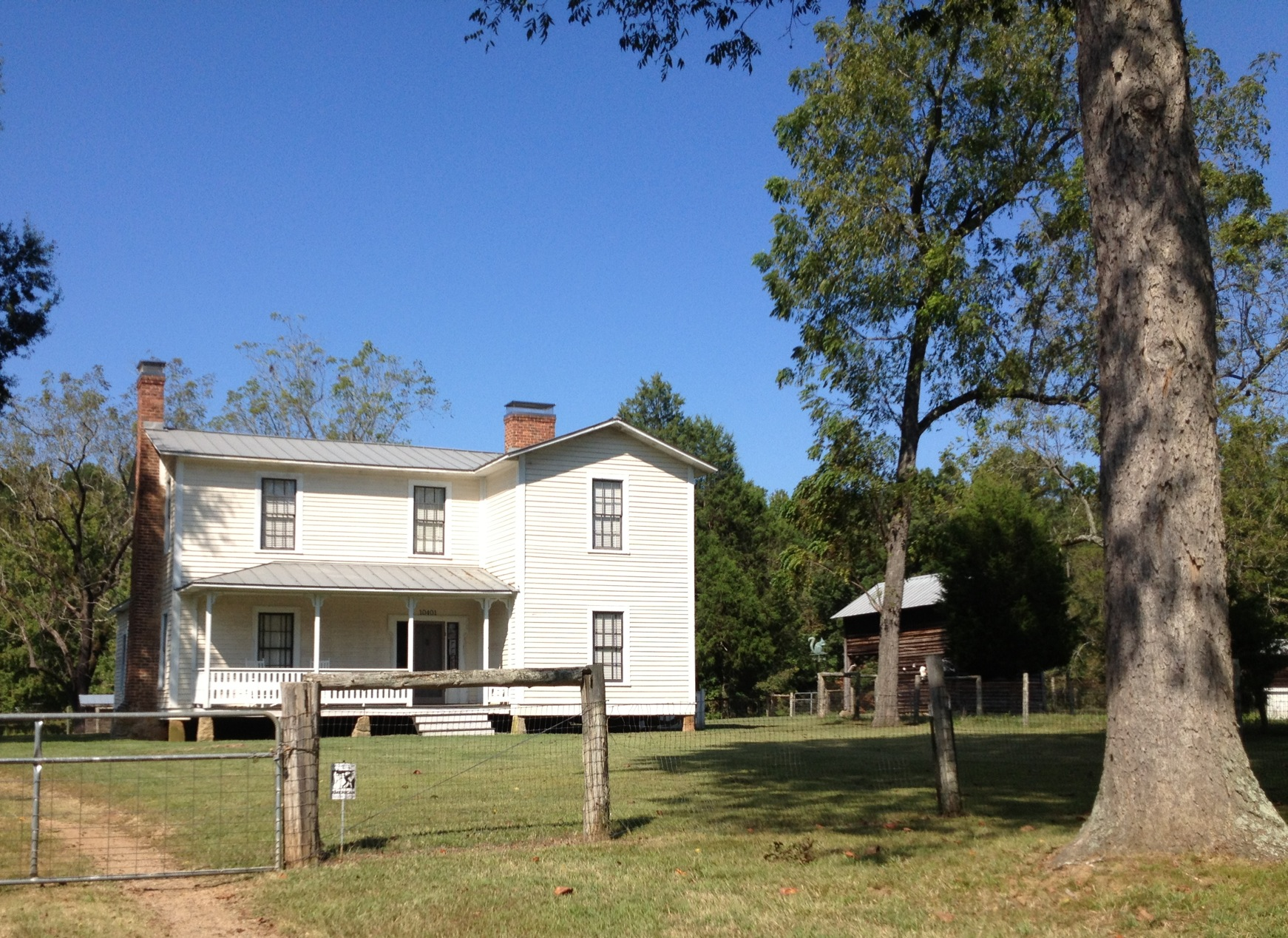
- Albert McCoy Farm House, September 2013

- Location within North Carolina Location within the United States
- Location: 10401 McCoy Rd., near Huntersville, North Carolina
- Coordinates: 35°22′01″N 80°53′10″W
- Area: 76.4 acres (30.9 ha)
- Built: 1886
- Built by: McAuley, John Ellis
- Architectural style: Queen Anne
- MPS: Rural Mecklenburg County MPS
- NRHP reference No.: 00001291
- Added to NRHP: November 2, 2000

Albert McCoy Farm is a historic home, farm, and national historic district located near Huntersville, Mecklenburg County, North Carolina. The district encompasses two contributing buildings, one contributing site, and five contributing structures in rural Mecklenburg County. The farmhouse was built about 1886, and is a two-story, timber frame, side-gable-and-wing dwelling with vernacular Queen Anne style design elements. It has a shallow cross gable roof, weatherboard siding, and three brick chimneys. It features a pedimented gable front porch. Other contributing resources include an arbor, a log corn crib, a wellhouse, a smokehouse, a privy, pumphouse, and the agricultural landscape.

It was added to the National Register of Historic Places in 2000.
