= McCoy Mill =

- U.S. National Register of Historic Places
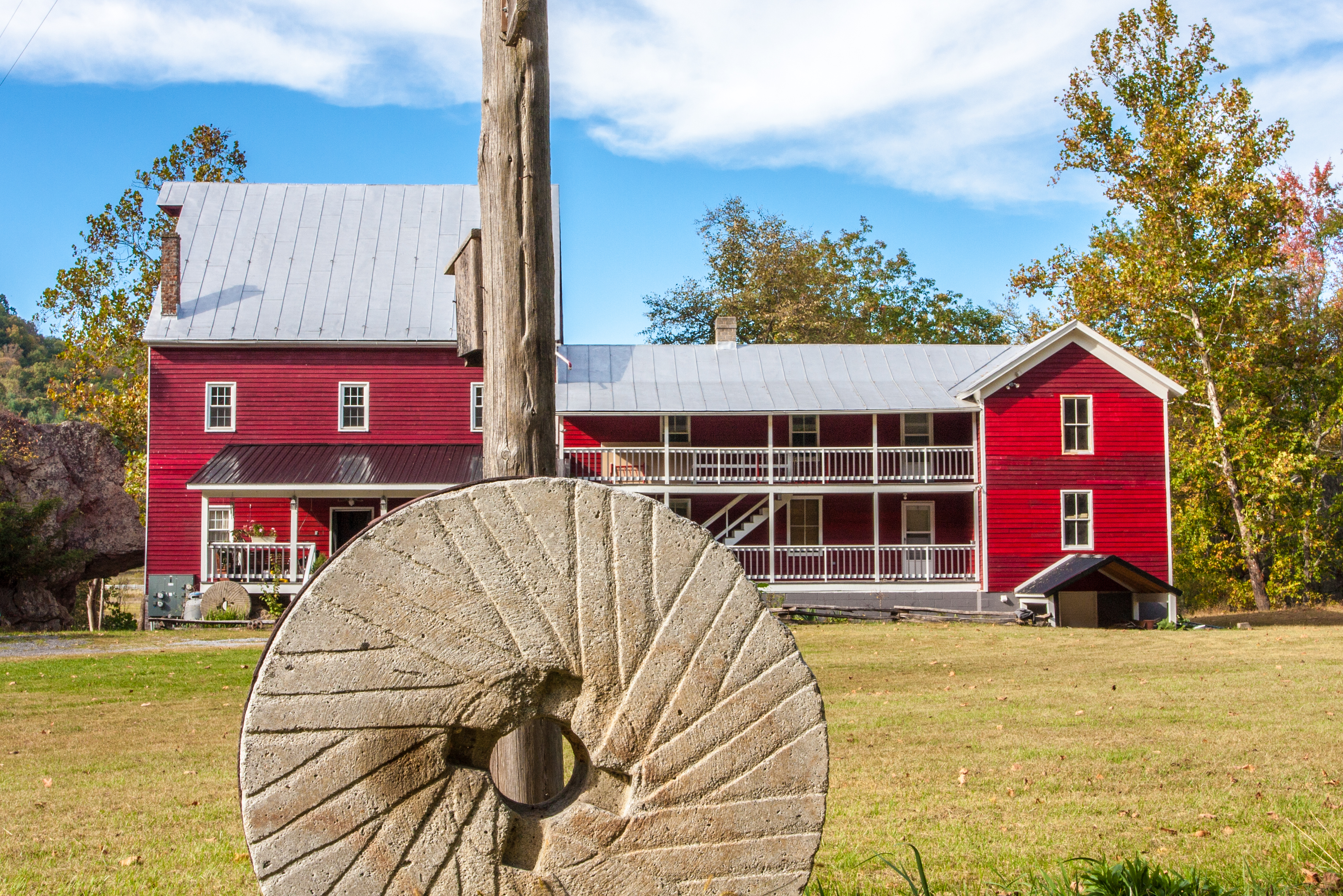

- Location within West Virginia Location within the United States
- Location: Johnstown Rd., near Franklin, West Virginia
- Coordinates: 38°36′34″N 79°21′4″W
- Area: less than one acre
- Built: 1845
- Built by: James William Byrd
- MPS: South Branch Valley MRA
- NRHP reference No.: 86000780
- Added to NRHP: January 14, 1986

McCoy Mill is a historic grist mill on U.S. Highway 220, three miles south of Franklin, Pendleton County, West Virginia. It was built in 1845, and has a late 19th- to early 20th-century addition. It replaced a mill that operated on the site as early as 1766. It is a 2½-story, T-shaped frame building. General William McCoy (1768-1835) owned an earlier mill on the site.

It was listed on the National Register of Historic Places in 1986.

It is one of West Virginia's oldest landmarks. Framed by the rugged mountains of Pendleton County, it employed generations of millers, drawing its water power from Thorn Creek just before the creek empties into the Potomac River's South Branch.

The first mill on the site was built about the time of the French and Indian War by Ulrich Conrad Sr., who came as a pioneer settler from Switzerland in 1753. From Augusta Co, VA Court records: Page 462.--18 March 1777. Ulrick Conrad, Sr., to Ulrick Conrad, Jr., his son, at mouth of Black Thorn on South Branch of Potomac, 6 acres with mill seat thereon erected, patented to Ulrick (Sr) 12 May 1770. (The mill property was later acquired by a General William McCoy, merchant of Franklin, who also purchased the Peninger and Conrad estates which extended from Franklin to the mouth of the Thorn.) According to Elsie Byrd Boggs's History of Franklin, Conrad supplied the soldiers in Lord Dunmore's War with flour and meal in 1774.

Conrad's son inherited the mill from his father in 1777. Gen. William McCoy, a Franklin merchant, later acquired it. When he died in 1835, the mill passed to his nephew, William McCoy, who found the business so lucrative, he decided to replace the old mill with a modern one, whose construction began in 1845.

The 1845 mill is the present four-story building, its large hand-hewn beams supported by a thick stone foundation. It originally had the familiar overshot mill wheel, but it was replaced by a more efficient underwater turbine in the early 20th century. Grain was milled there until the mid-1900s, and the mill and connecting residence were adapted late in the century as a furniture workshop and bed-and-breakfast inn.

The mill's future is uncertain. In 2010 the inn ceased operation and the property was offered for sale.
