= Brandywine, West Virginia =

Brandywine
- Census-designated place (CDP)
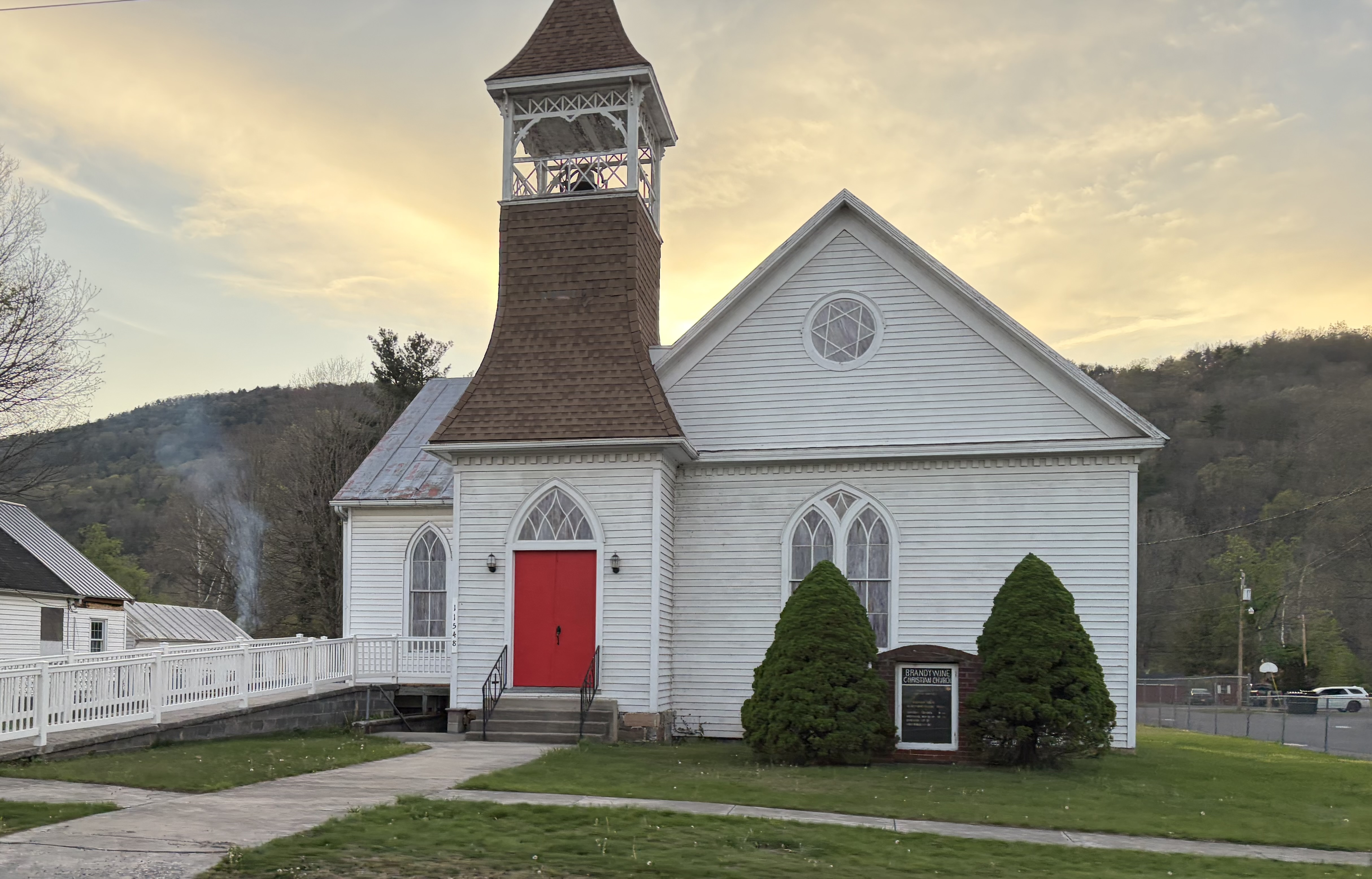
- Brandywine Christian Church on U.S. Route 33

- Location of Brandywine in West Virginia
- Coordinates: 38°37′19″N 79°14′29″W
- Country: United States
- State: West Virginia
- County: Pendleton

Area
  - Total: 0.491 sq mi (1.27 km^{2})
  - Land: 0.491 sq mi (1.27 km^{2})
  - Water: 0 sq mi (0 km^{2})

Population (2020)
  - Total: 178
  - Density: 363/sq mi (140/km^{2})
- Time zone: UTC-5 (Eastern (EST))
  - Summer (DST): UTC-4 (EDT)
- GNIS feature ID: 2586770

Brandywine is a census-designated place (CDP) located on U.S. Highway 33 in Pendleton County, West Virginia, United States. The town lies along the South Fork South Branch Potomac River at its confluence with Hawes Run. At the 2020 United States census, its population was 178.

Located nearby within the George Washington National Forest is the Brandywine Recreation Area which includes Brandywine Lake, a reservoir on Hawes Run created by the South Fork Structure Number 13 Dam.

Located near Brandywine is the Old Probst Church, listed on the National Register of Historic Places in 1986.
