= Cunningham-Hevener House =

Historic house in West Virginia, United States

- U.S. National Register of Historic Places
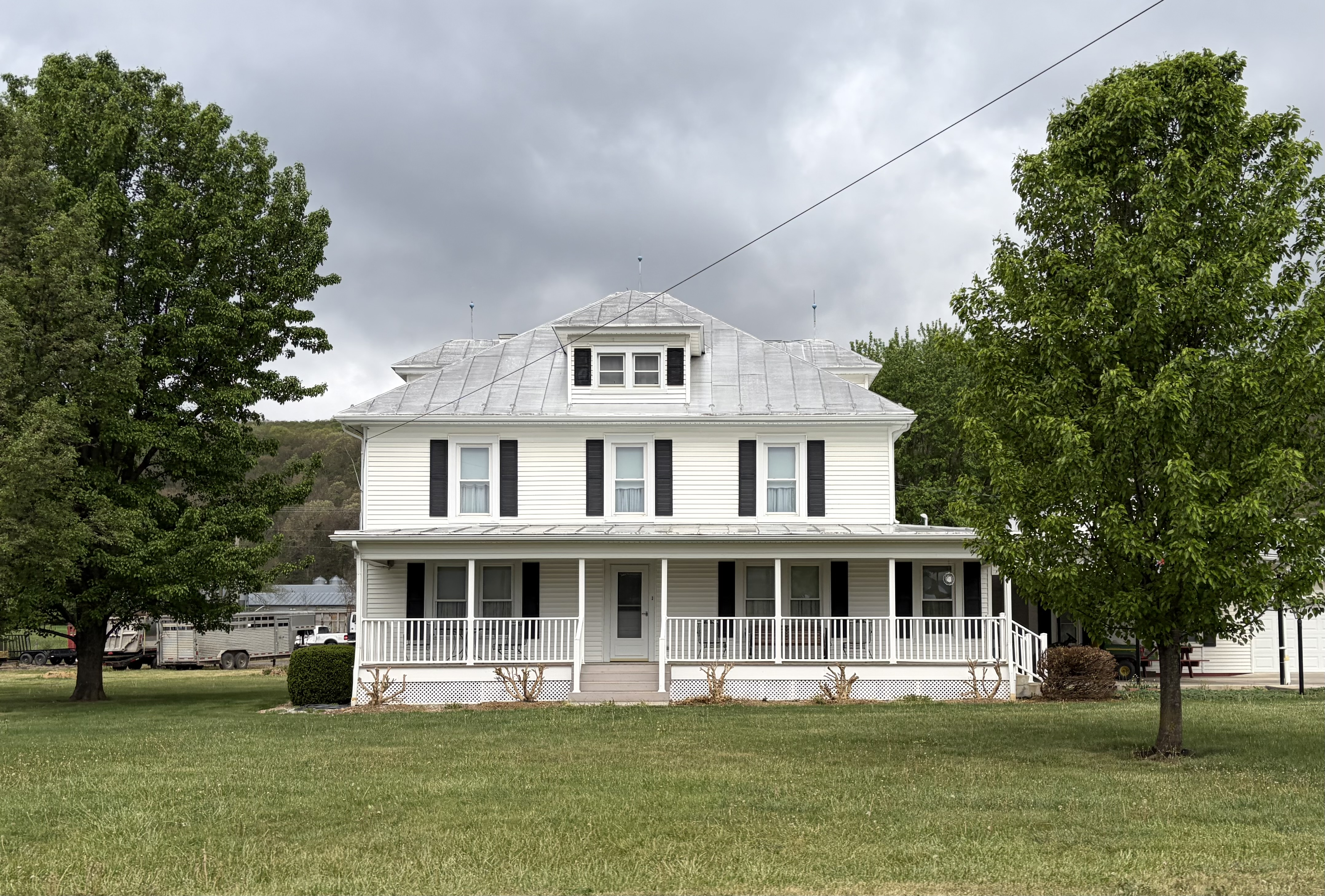
- The Cunningham-Hevener House in 2026

- Location within West Virginia Location within the United States
- Location: US 220, Upper Tract, West Virginia
- Coordinates: 38°46′40″N 79°17′5″W
- Area: less than one acre
- Built: 1880
- Architectural style: Italian Villa
- MPS: South Branch Valley MRA
- NRHP reference No.: 85001595
- Added to NRHP: July 10, 1985

Cunningham-Hevener House is a historic home located at Upper Tract, Pendleton County, West Virginia. It was built about 1880, and is a two-story, T-shaped Greek Revival / Italian Villa style masonry dwelling. It features a full-width, two-story porch supported by Ionic order columns.

It was listed on the National Register of Historic Places in 1985.
