= Ananias Pitsenbarger Farm =

Historic house in West Virginia, United States

- U.S. National Register of Historic Places
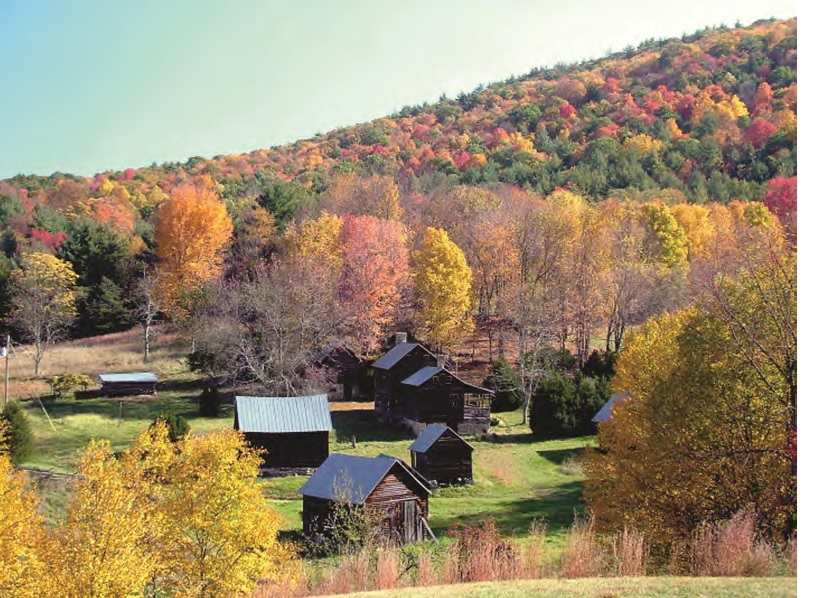

- Location within West Virginia Location within the United States
- Location: WV 23 approximately 1/4 mile south of junction with County Route 23/1, near Franklin, West Virginia
- Coordinates: 38°34′40″N 79°19′07″W
- Area: 130 acres (53 ha)
- Built: c. 1845, c. 1900
- Built by: Propst, John; Pitsenbarger, Ananias J
- NRHP reference No.: 11000557
- Added to NRHP: August 18, 2011

Ananias Pitsenbarger Farm is an historic home and farm complex located in the unincorporated community of Dahmer, near Franklin, Pendleton County, West Virginia. The original section of the house was built in 1845, and includes the 2 1/2-story section on the north end, with a later 1 1/2-story addition built about 1900. The house rests on a foundation of coursed rubble stone and is clad in weatherboard siding. It has a standing-seam metal gable roof. Also on the property are 15 log and frame contributing outbuildings. They include the cellar house, two hog pens, a stable, woodworking shop, carriage house, chicken coop, granary (photo 10), shed, privy constructed by the Works Progress Administration, spring house, three small hay barns, and a large double-crib log hay barn. Also on the property is the Pitsenbarger Cemetery.

The Farm is known to have had the nickname "Loafer's Glory." This was likely due to the Pitsenbarger's reputation for being hospitable, the farm's location on a trail connecting two waterways and leading toward Harrisonburg, VA, plus the hard cider and apple brandy they produced. The current property owners operate Loafer's Glory Log Cabin Resort & Event Venue as well as Dry Run Spirits, a distillery, on the premises.

The Ananias Pitsenbarger Farm was listed on the National Register of Historic Places in 2011.
