= Old Probst Church =

Historic church in Pendleton County, West Virginia

- Old Propst Church
- U.S. National Register of Historic Places
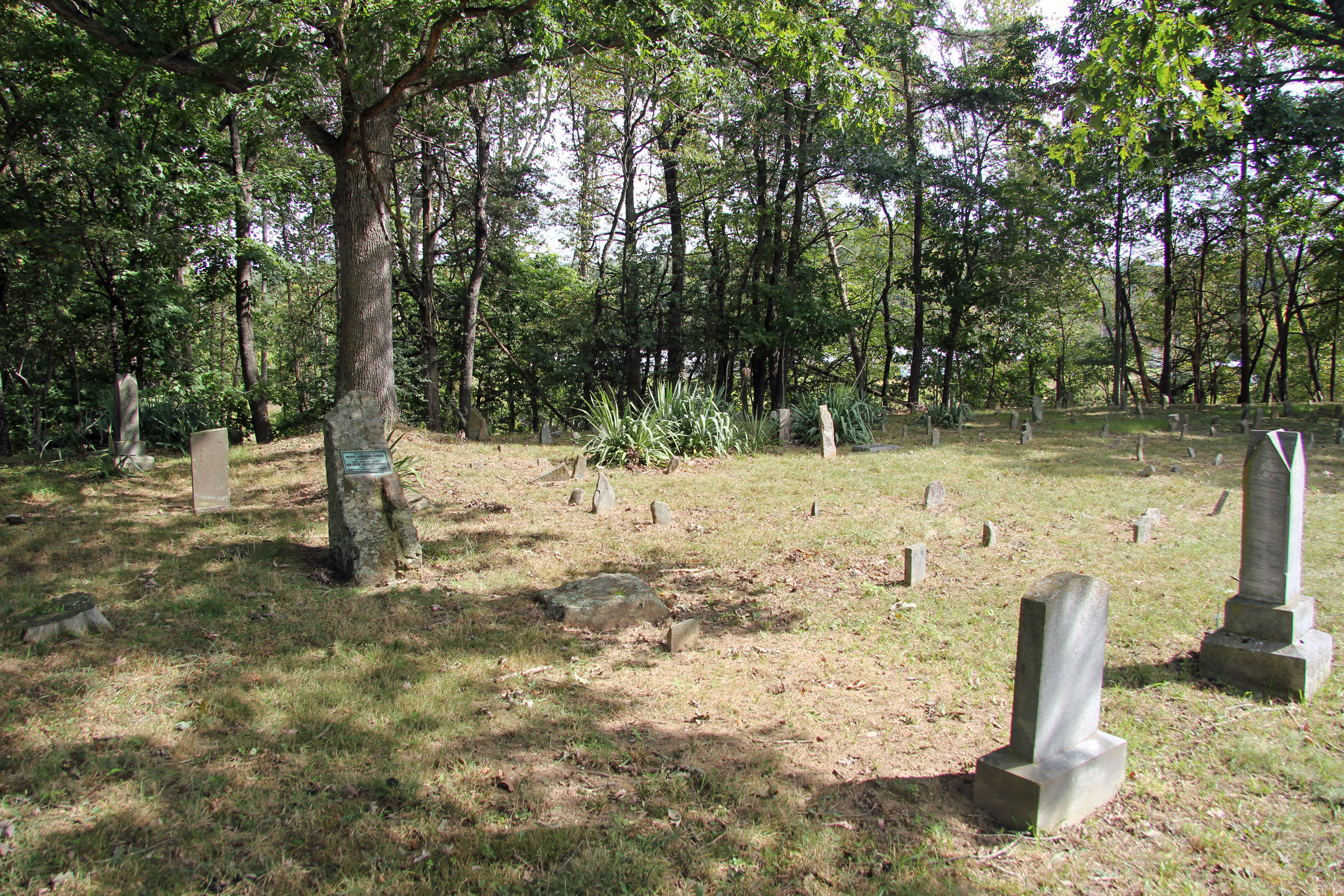
- Old Probst Lutheran Church Marker

- Location within West Virginia Location within the United States
- Location: County Route 21/9, near Brandywine, West Virginia
- Coordinates: 38°35′53″N 79°15′25″W
- Area: 1.5 acres (0.61 ha)
- Built: 1769, 1887
- Architect: Keister, Eugene
- MPS: South Branch Valley MRA
- NRHP reference No.: 86000779
- Added to NRHP: January 14, 1986

Old Probst Church, also known as Propst Lutheran Church, is a historic Lutheran church located near Brandywine, Pendleton County, West Virginia. It was built about 1887, and is a rectangular frame building with clapboard siding on a cut stone foundation. The church was in use until 1920, then renovated starting in 1968 for use as a community center. The surrounding property includes the site of the first church, built about 1769. A second log church building was removed from the site in 1885, and used as a house, and later a barn.

It was listed on the National Register of Historic Places in 1986.
