= Pendleton County Poor Farm =

- U.S. National Register of Historic Places
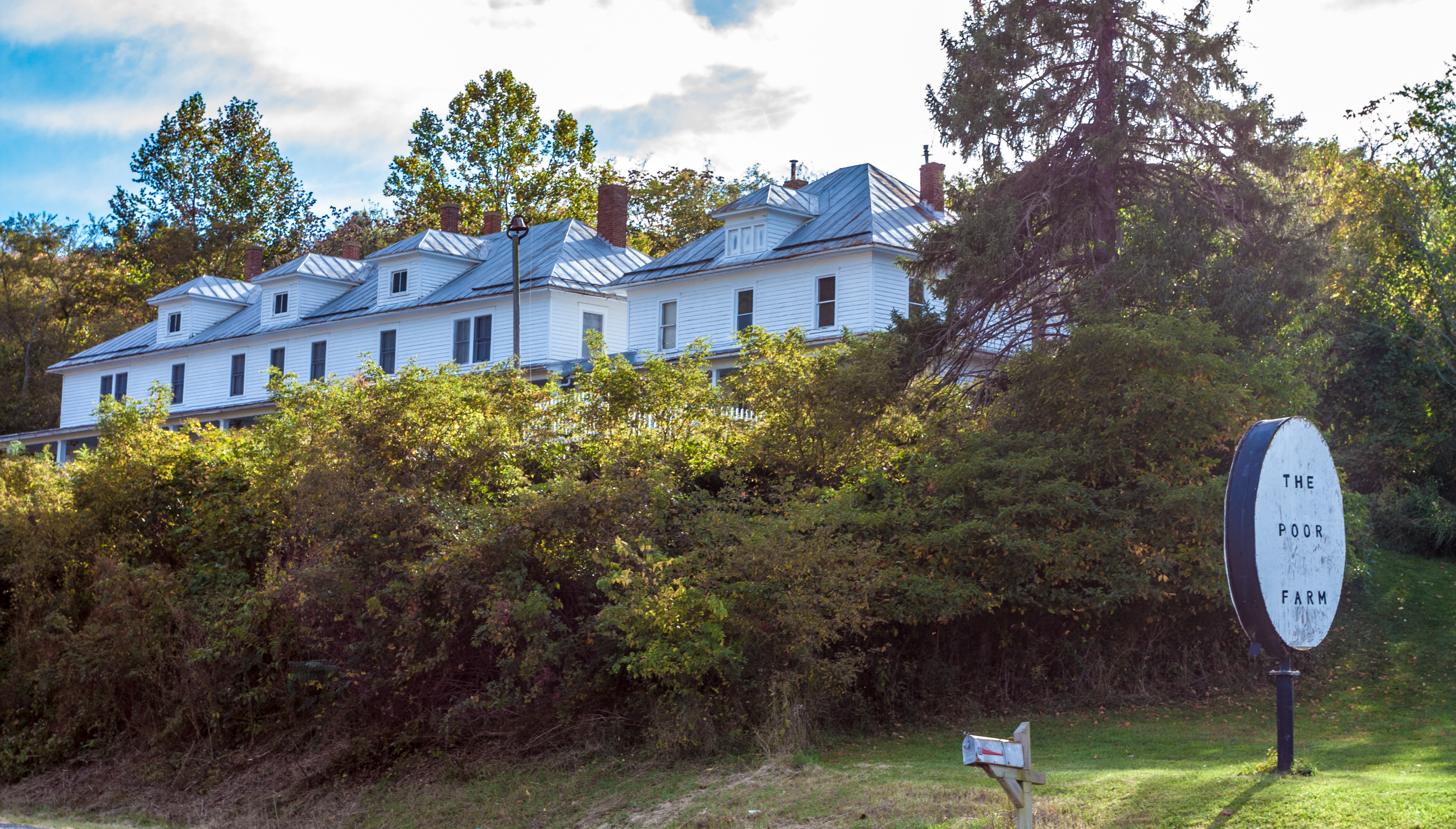
- Pendleton County Poor Farm, October 2013

- Location within West Virginia Location within the United States
- Location: US 220, Upper Tract, West Virginia
- Coordinates: 38°44′59″N 79°17′15″W
- Area: 1 acre (0.40 ha)
- Built: 1900
- Architectural style: Four-square
- MPS: South Branch Valley MRA
- NRHP reference No.: 86000775
- Added to NRHP: January 14, 1986

Pendleton County Poor Farm is a historic poor farm house located at Upper Tract, Pendleton County, West Virginia. It was built about 1900, and is a large, 2 1/2-story frame building. It features a full-width front porch and hipped roof with dormers.

It was listed on the National Register of Historic Places in 1986.
