= Upper Tract, West Virginia =

Unincorporated community in West Virginia, United States

Upper Tract
- Unincorporated community
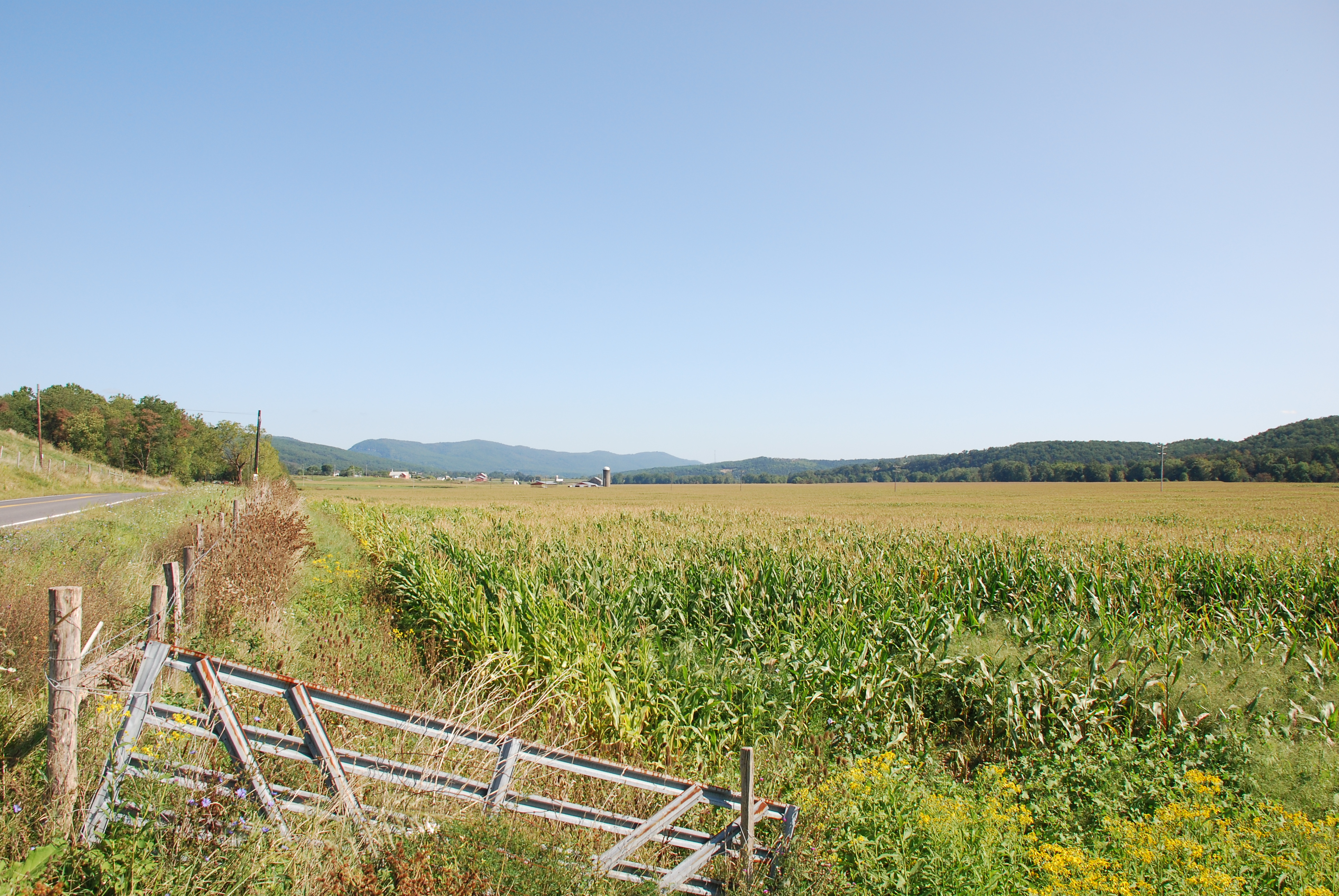
- Corn fields with Upper Tract in the back

- Location within the state of West Virginia Upper Tract (the United States)
- Coordinates: 38°47′14″N 79°16′57″W
- Country: United States
- State: West Virginia
- County: Pendleton
- Elevation: 1,558 ft (475 m)
- Time zone: UTC-5 (Eastern (EST))
  - Summer (DST): UTC-4 (EDT)
- GNIS feature ID: 1555861

Upper Tract is an unincorporated community in Pendleton County, West Virginia, United States.

== Description ==
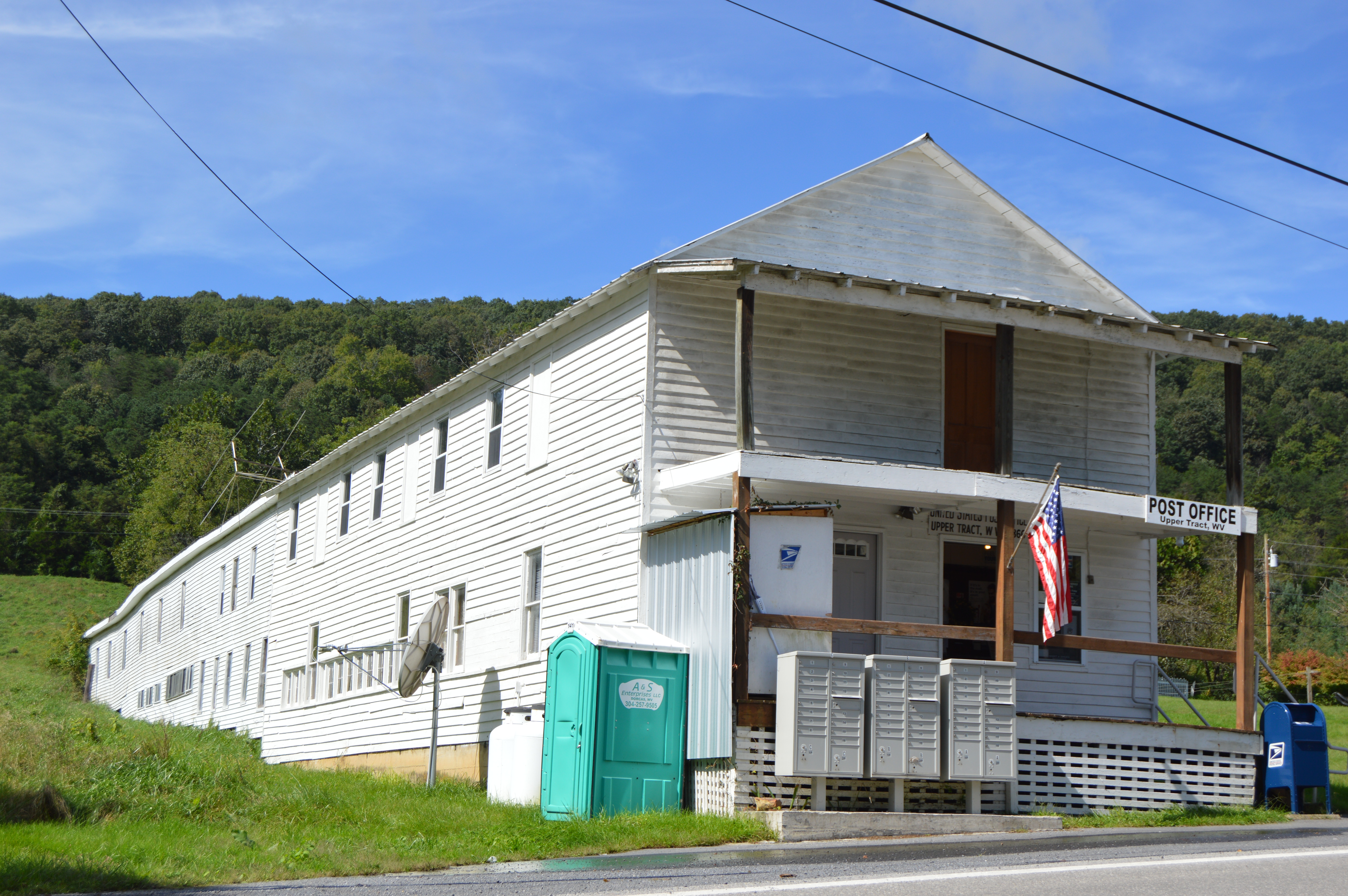
Upper Tract post office, September 2018

The community lies along U.S. Highway 220 at the confluence of Reeds Creek and the South Branch Potomac River. It has a post office with a ZIP Code of 26866.

The community took its name from a nearby 18th-century pioneer settlement. Two local structures — the Cunningham-Hevener House and the Pendleton County Poor Farm — are listed on the National Register of Historic Places.

Upper Tract is notable as one of the driest places in the United States east of the Mississippi River, owing to an isolated rain shadow from Spruce Knob to the west. Between 1899 and 1930 Upper Tract averaged only 28.82 inches or 732.0 millimetres of precipitation, and in the extreme drought year of 1930 it received a remarkably low 9.50 inches or 241.3 millimetres for the entire year — the lowest annual precipitation ever recorded in the US east of the Mississippi, and indeed less than fell during that year in such dry cities as Tucson and San Diego.
