= McCoy House (Franklin, West Virginia) =

Historic house in West Virginia, United States

- U.S. National Register of Historic Places
- U.S. Historic district – Contributing property
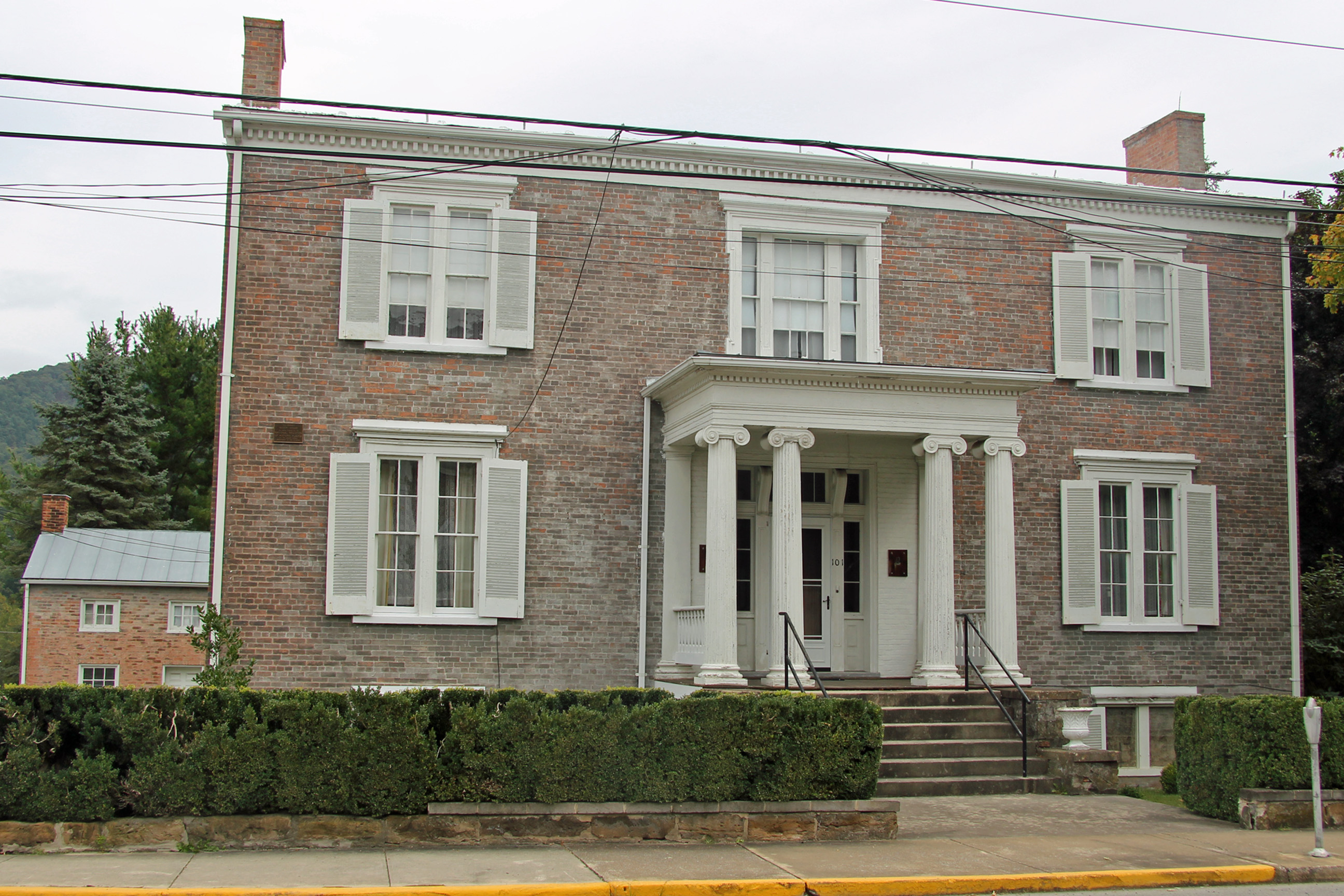

- Location within West Virginia Location within the United States
- Location: Main St., Franklin, West Virginia
- Coordinates: 38°38′29″N 79°19′52″W
- Area: 0.6 acres (0.24 ha)
- Built: 1848
- Architectural style: Greek Revival
- NRHP reference No.: 82004328
- Added to NRHP: December 10, 1982

The McCoy House, also known as Franklin Town Office or Pendleton County Library, is a historic home located at Franklin, Pendleton County, West Virginia. It was built in 1848, and is a two- to three-story, L-shaped, brick building in the Greek Revival-style. It features a one-bay entrance portico with two sets of double Ionic order columns. A three-story porch is incorporated into the northeastern section.

It was listed on the National Register of Historic Places in 1996.
