= Seneca Creek (North Fork South Branch Potomac River tributary) =

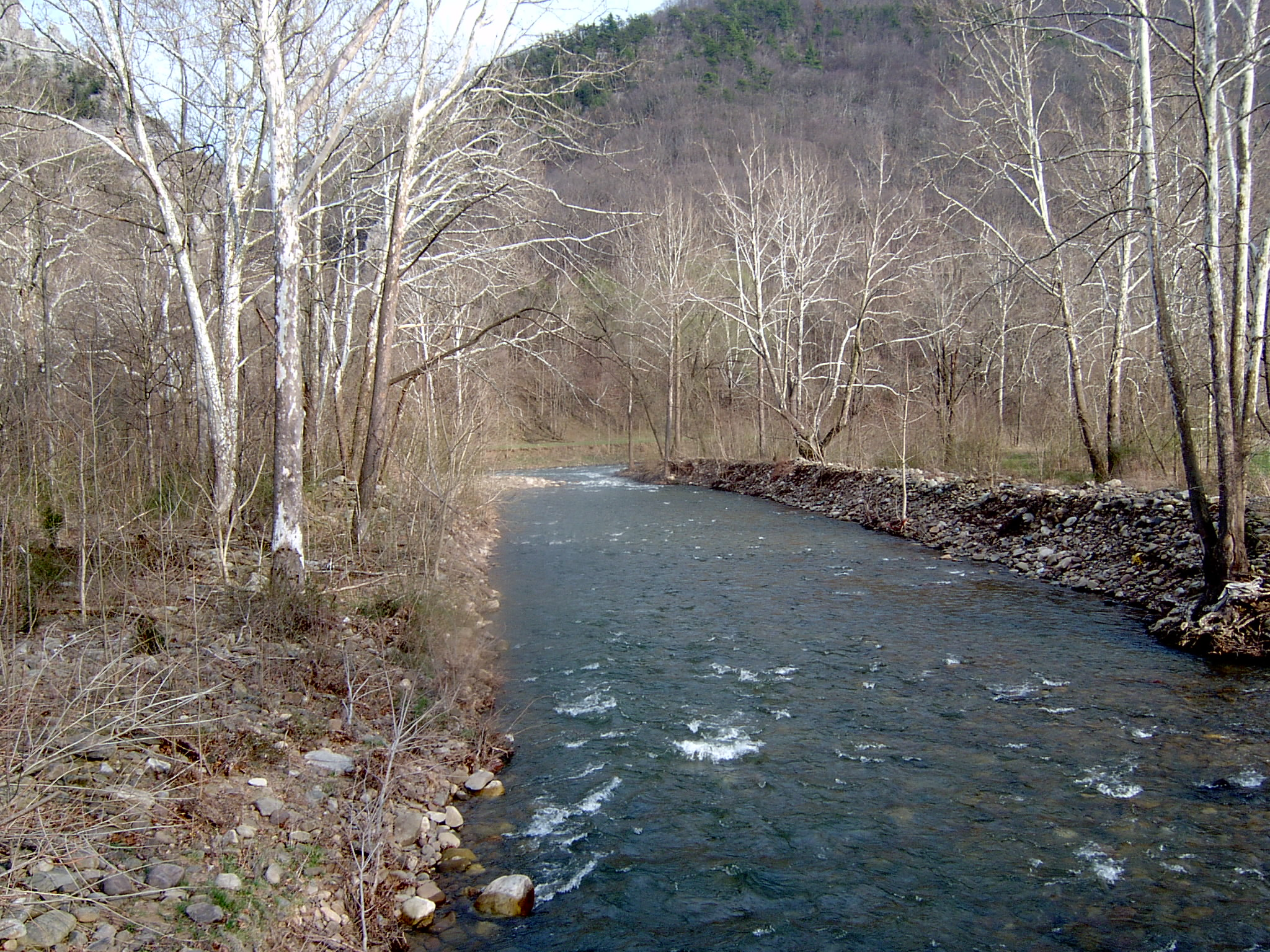
- Seneca Creek just upstream of its mouth

Location
- Country: United States
- State: West Virginia
- Counties: Pendleton

Physical characteristics
- Source: Slab Camp Run
  - location: Allegheny Mountain, Pendleton County, WV
  - coordinates: 38°43′29″N 79°33′23″W
  - elevation: 3,912 ft (1,192 m)
- 2nd source: Trussel Run
  - location: Spruce Mountain, Pocahontas County, WV
  - coordinates: 38°42′47″N 79°32′31″W
  - elevation: 3,944 ft (1,202 m)
- Source confluence
  - location: Pendleton County, WV
  - coordinates: 38°43′04″N 79°32′46″W
  - elevation: 3,747 ft (1,142 m)
- Mouth: North Fork South Branch Potomac River
  - location: Seneca Rocks, WV
  - coordinates: 38°09′42″N 81°11′47″W
  - elevation: 1,532 ft (467 m)

Seneca Creek is a 19.6-mile-long (31.5 km) tributary of the North Fork of the South Branch of the Potomac River located entirely within Pendleton County, West Virginia, USA.

Seneca Creek lies within the Appalachian Mountains, in the Spruce Knob–Seneca Rocks National Recreation Area of the Monongahela National Forest. It is formed by two spring-fed streams, Slab Camp Run and Trussel Run, on the western flanks of Spruce Mountain to the north of Spruce Knob. It empties into the North Fork of the South Branch at the community of Seneca Rocks near the base of the Seneca Rocks sandstone cliff formation.

== Recreation ==
Seneca Creek is popular destination for anglers, hikers, and backpackers. In 1999 it was named one of the 100 best trout streams in the United States. It holds native brook trout from the northern strain as well as wild rainbow trout.

The upper portion of the creek is paralleled by the Seneca Creek Trail, a 5-mile trail that begins at the Eastern Continental Divide on National Forest Road 112 and ends at its junction with the Horton Trail. The trail is part of the Seneca Creek Backcountry trail system, a 60-mile network of trails that extends from the Eastern Continental Divide down into the towns of Whitmer and Onego and is bounded by Gandy Creek to the west and Spruce Mountain to the east.

== Tributaries ==
Tributary streams are listed from south (source) to north (mouth).

- Slab Camp Run
- Trussel Run
- Beech Run
- Lower Gulf Run
  - Whites Run
- Gulf Run
- Strader Run
- Horsecamp Run
  - Wamsley Run
  - McIntosh Run
- Roaring Creek
- Brushy Run

== Communities along Seneca Creek ==
- Onego
- Seneca Rocks
- Teterton

== See also ==
- List of West Virginia rivers
