= Shawnee Trail (West Virginia) =

American Indian trail in West Virginia, U.S.

The Shawnee Trail was the white settlers' name for an American Indian trail in what is now eastern West Virginia, USA. It was a segment (or branch) of the much larger Indian trail network known as the Great Indian Warpath, which stretched from New York to Alabama. The GIW was referred to from this point north as the "Seneca Trail". Thus, in pioneer days, the segment known as the Shawnee Trail was often also referred to as the Seneca Trail.

== Route ==
The Shawnee Trail began on the South Branch Potomac River somewhere below what is now Moorefield, West Virginia and proceeded up that river to its confluence with the North Fork South Branch Potomac River. It continued up that Fork and up Seneca Creek (passing Seneca Rocks) and crossed the crests of the Allegheny Mountains (and in so doing, the upper tributaries of the Cheat River) above the mouth of Horse Camp Creek. This segment passed near the future sites of Harman and Bowden. The trail entered the Tygart River Valley near Elkins and proceeded up the Tygart past Beverly to Huttonsville.

== Traffic ==
The Shawnee Trail was long used by the Algonquians (including the Shawnee), Tuscarora, and Seneca nations to transit this part of the Alleghenies for purposes of trade and war. The name "Shawnee Trail" was applied after Native Americans of that tribe followed the trail out of the region after burning Fort Seybert (1758) in Pendleton County, West Virginia.

A local historian described the use of the Trail in white pioneer days, and later, as follows:

[The Shawnee Trail] was much used by early settlers and became important for a century as the chief highway between the South Branch and Tygart's valley. Over it, travelled hundreds of pack horses loaded with salt, iron, and other merchandise, and many droves of cattle fattened for the eastern market. In the Civil War it furnished an avenue of escape for a detachment of Confederates cut off from General Garnett's army at the battle of Rich mountain, five miles west of Beverly, in 1861, and it was used by Imboden and Jones in driving eastward the horses and cattle captured in their great raid of 1863.

== See also ==
- Texas Road, a pioneering cattle trail originally called "Shawnee Trail"
