= Sweedlin, West Virginia =

Sweedlin
- Unincorporated community
- Location within the state of West Virginia Sweedlin (the United States)
- Coordinates: 38°44′29″N 79°8′9″W
- Country: United States
- State: West Virginia
- County: Pendleton
- Elevation: 1,555 ft (474 m)
- Time zone: UTC-5 (Eastern (EST))
  - Summer (DST): UTC-4 (EDT)
- GNIS ID: 2702473

Sweedlin is an unincorporated community located in the north-east of Pendleton County, West Virginia, United States.
