= Seneca Rocks, West Virginia =

Seneca Rocks
- Unincorporated community
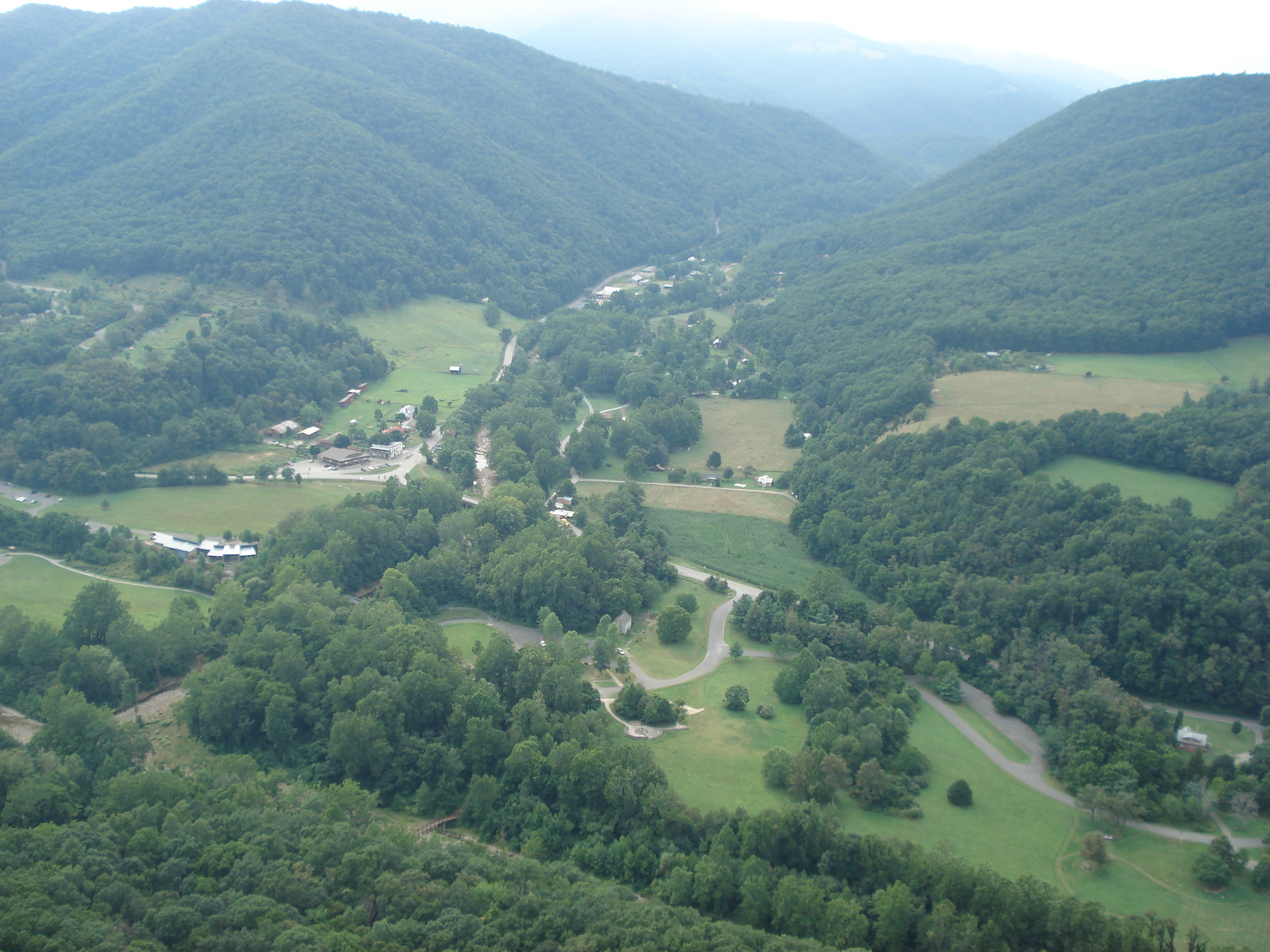
- Community of Seneca Rocks, West Virginia at the confluence of Seneca Creek and the North Fork South Branch Potomac River. The "Seneca Rocks Discovery Center" is on the left side of the photo which was taken from atop Seneca Rocks.

- Location within the state of West Virginia Seneca Rocks (the United States)
- Coordinates: 38°50′5″N 79°22′34″W
- Country: United States
- State: West Virginia
- County: Pendleton
- Elevation: 1,568 ft (478 m)
- Time zone: UTC-5 (Eastern (EST))
  - Summer (DST): UTC-4 (EDT)
- ZIP code: 26884
- Area codes: 304 and 681
- GNIS feature ID: 1552243

Seneca Rocks is an unincorporated community located in Pendleton County, West Virginia, United States. The community of Seneca Rocks — formerly known as Mouth of Seneca — lies at the junction of US 33, WV 28 and WV 55 near the confluence of Seneca Creek and the North Fork South Branch Potomac River. The community also lies near Seneca Rocks, the crag from which it takes its name. Both lie within the Spruce Knob–Seneca Rocks National Recreation Area of the Monongahela National Forest.

Located at Seneca Rocks is the Sites Homestead (c. 1839), now part of the Seneca Rocks Visitor Center and listed on the National Register of Historic Places in 2004. Located nearby is the Boggs Mill (c. 1830), listed in 2004.
