= Onego, West Virginia =

Onego
- Unincorporated community
- Location within the state of West Virginia Onego (the United States)
- Coordinates: 38°50′52.7028″N 79°25′20.1414″W
- Country: United States
- State: West Virginia
- County: Pendleton
- Time zone: UTC-5 (Eastern (EST))
  - Summer (DST): UTC-4 (EDT)
- GNIS feature ID: 1552388

Onego (pronounced '1 go') is an unincorporated community located along U.S. Highway 33 at the confluence of Seneca Creek and Roaring Creek in Pendleton County, West Virginia, United States. Onego lies within the Monongahela National Forest in the Appalachian Mountains, near Seneca Rocks.

Several folk theories of the etymology of the name exist. The community may have been named after an Indian tribe. Some residents claim that the town was so named because a previous version of the bridge through town crossing Roaring Creek was so narrow that it only allowed one car to go at a time. The name is actually a Seneca word meaning pool, found referring to the pool of Bethesda in the Seneca Gospel, John 5:2.

Onego is also the site of actor Johnny Lewis' grandparents' homestead.
