= Boggs Mill =

- U.S. National Register of Historic Places
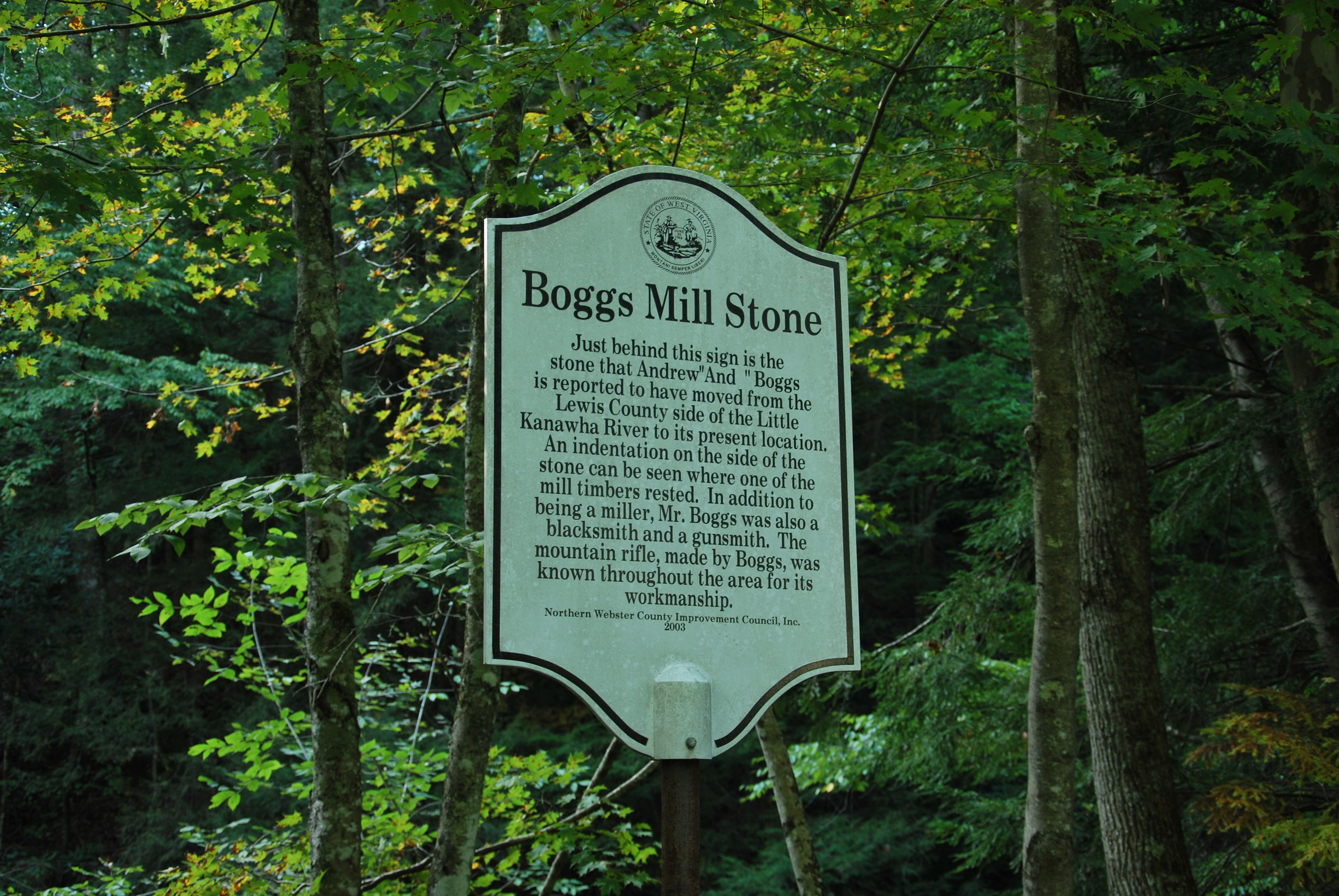
- Historical marker for the Boggs Mill Stone along the Mountain Parkway Backway

- Location within West Virginia Location within the United States
- Location: U.S. Route 33 and WV 28, north of junction with County Route 9, near Seneca Rocks, West Virginia
- Coordinates: 38°49′9″N 79°23′9″W
- Area: less than one acre
- Built: c. 1830
- Architectural style: Roller mill
- NRHP reference No.: 04000915
- Added to NRHP: August 25, 2004

Boggs Mill is a historic grist mill located near Seneca Rocks, Pendleton County, West Virginia. It was built about 1830, and is a 3 1/2-story, rectangular, gable front building. It has clapboard siding and was constructed using mortise and tenon, braced frame construction. It sits on a stone foundation and has a standing-seam metal roof. The mill remained in operation until 1966; it was damaged by a severe flood in 1985.

It was listed on the National Register of Historic Places in 2004.
