= Sites Homestead =

Historic house in West Virginia, United States

- U.S. National Register of Historic Places
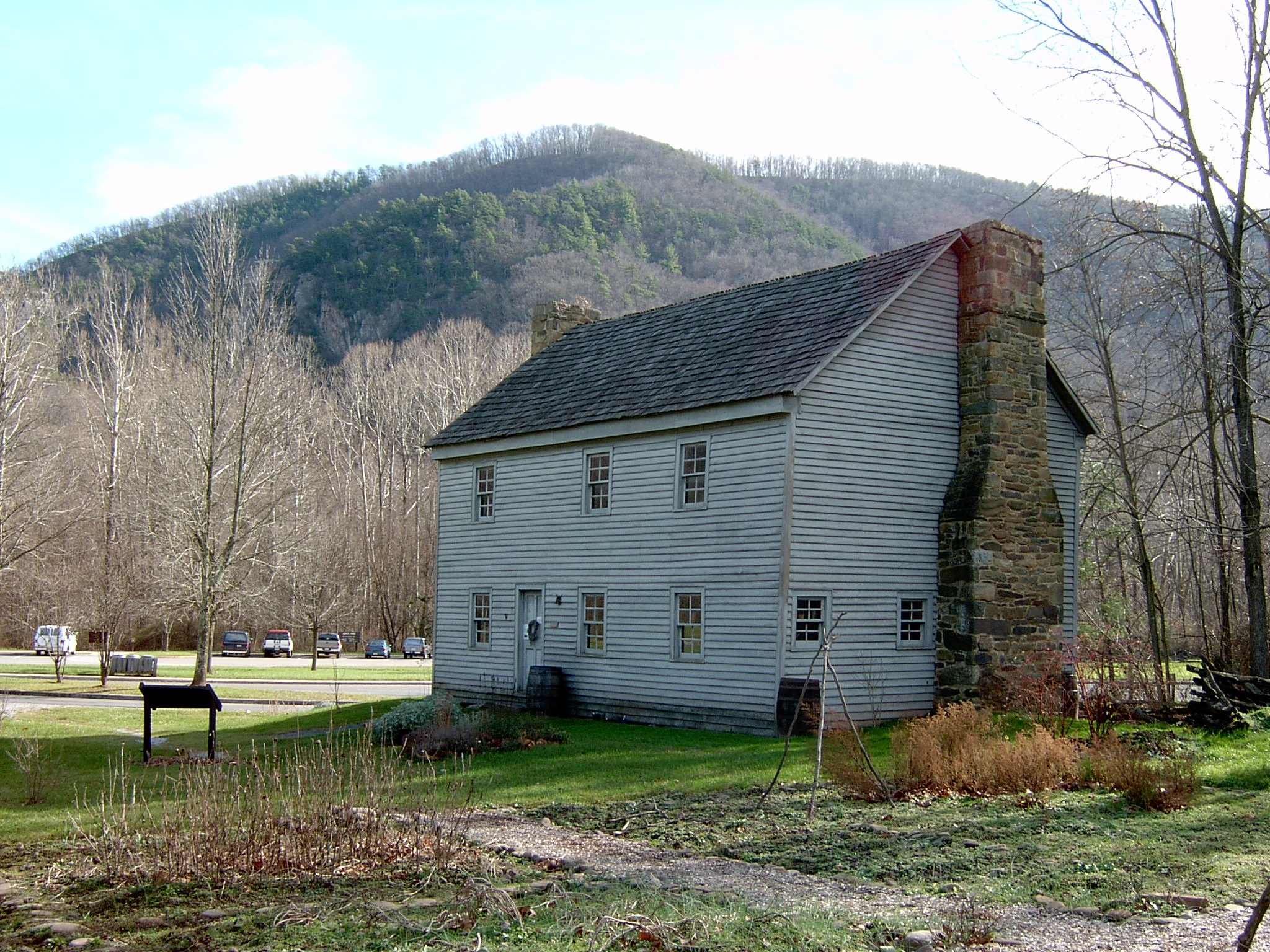
- Sites Homestead, November 2003

- Location within West Virginia Location within the United States
- Location: Seneca Rocks Visitor Center, Seneca Rocks, West Virginia
- Coordinates: 38°50′9″N 79°22′26″W
- Built: 1839
- Architectural style: Vernacular, log I house
- NRHP reference No.: 93000382
- Added to NRHP: May 20, 1993

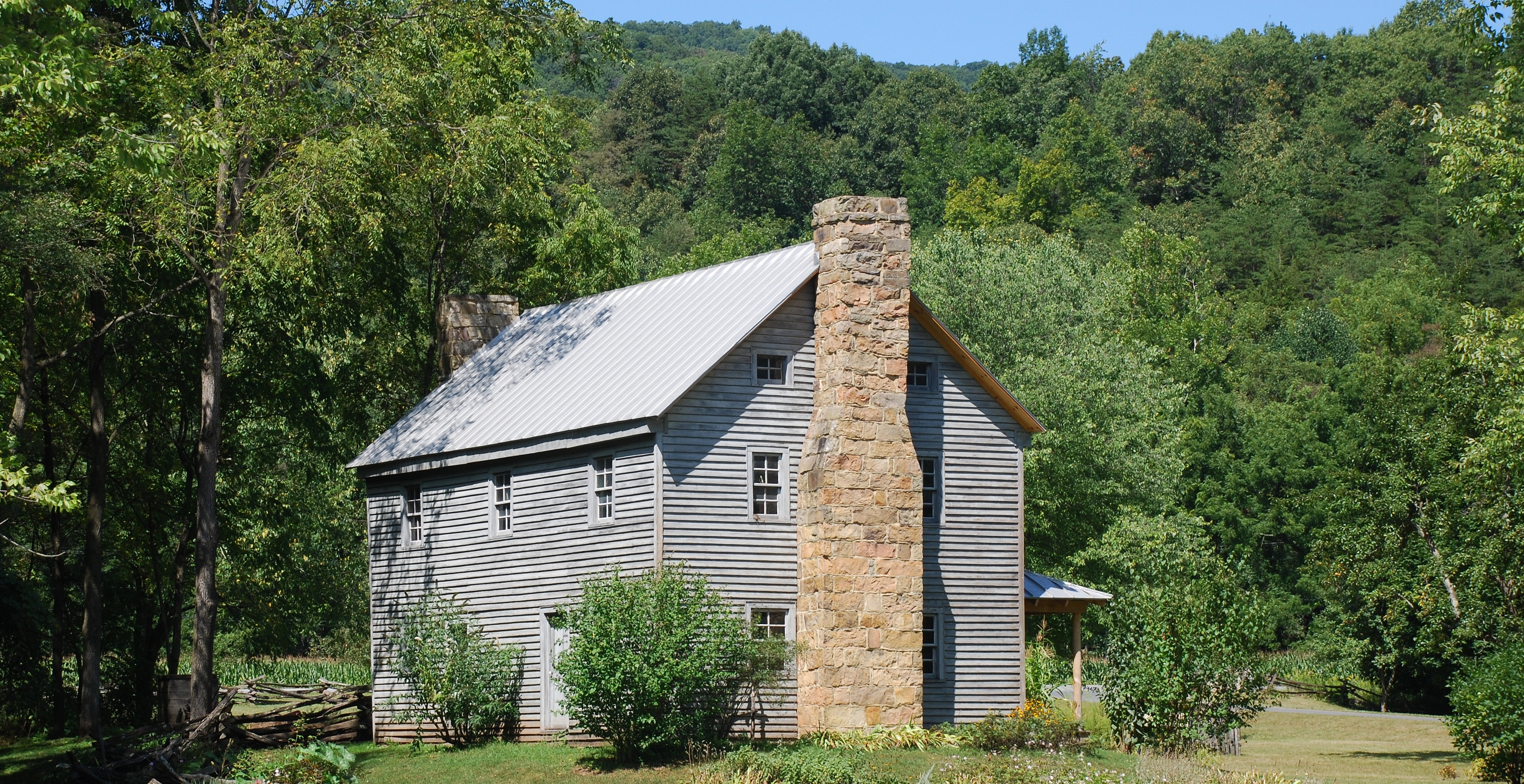
Sites Homestead

The Sites Homestead, also known as the Wayside Inn or the Sites Inn, is located near Seneca Rocks, West Virginia. The log house was built by Jacob Sites circa 1839 below the Seneca Rocks ridge. The house was expanded in the mid-1870s with a frame addition, remaining in the Sites family until it was acquired by the U.S. Forest Service in 1968 as part of Spruce Knob–Seneca Rocks National Recreation Area in Monongahela National Forest. The house had been used as a storage shed for some time and was in poor condition. It was restored by the Forest Service in the 1980s and became a temporary visitor center in 1992 after the Seneca Rocks visitor center burned. It is now part of the Seneca Rocks Discovery Center facility, operated by the Forest Service.
