= Simoda, West Virginia =

Simoda
- Unincorporated community
- Location within the state of West Virginia Simoda (the United States)
- Coordinates: 38°43′37″N 79°28′59″W
- Country: United States
- State: West Virginia
- County: Pendleton
- Time zone: UTC-5 (Eastern (EST))
  - Summer (DST): UTC-4 (EDT)
- GNIS feature ID: 1552896

Simoda is an unincorporated community located in Pendleton County, West Virginia, United States.

The community's name is an amalgamation of the name of Simon Dolly, who was instrumental in securing a post office for the town.
