= Mozer, West Virginia =

Mozer
- Unincorporated community
- Location within the state of West Virginia Mozer (the United States)
- Coordinates: 38°48′9″N 79°12′32″W
- Country: United States
- State: West Virginia
- County: Pendleton
- Time zone: UTC-5 (Eastern (EST))
  - Summer (DST): UTC-4 (EDT)
- GNIS feature ID: 1552250

Mozer is an unincorporated community in Pendleton County, West Virginia, United States.

The community was named after E. E. Mozer.
