= Oak Grove, Pendleton County, West Virginia =

Oak Grove
- Unincorporated community
- Location within the state of West Virginia Oak Grove (the United States)
- Coordinates: 38°37′33″N 79°21′17″W
- Country: United States
- State: West Virginia
- County: Pendleton
- Time zone: UTC-5 (Eastern (EST))
  - Summer (DST): UTC-4 (EDT)
- GNIS feature ID: 1552355

Oak Grove is an unincorporated community in Pendleton County, West Virginia, United States. Oak Grove lies on Smith Creek near its confluence with the South Branch Potomac River.
