= Kline, West Virginia =

Kline
- Unincorporated community
- Location within the state of West Virginia Kline (the United States)
- Coordinates: 38°46′44″N 79°13′31″W
- Country: United States
- State: West Virginia
- County: Pendleton
- Time zone: UTC-5 (Eastern (EST))
  - Summer (DST): UTC-4 (EDT)
- GNIS feature ID: 1554892

Kline is an unincorporated community located in Pendleton County, West Virginia, United States. Originally known as Clines Cross Roads, its name was changed to Kline in about 1875. The name comes from Samuel Kline (or Cline), an early postmaster.

Kline is located in Greenawalt Gap along Mill Run, a tributary of the South Branch Potomac River.
