= Old Judy Church =

Historic church in West Virginia, United States

- U.S. National Register of Historic Places
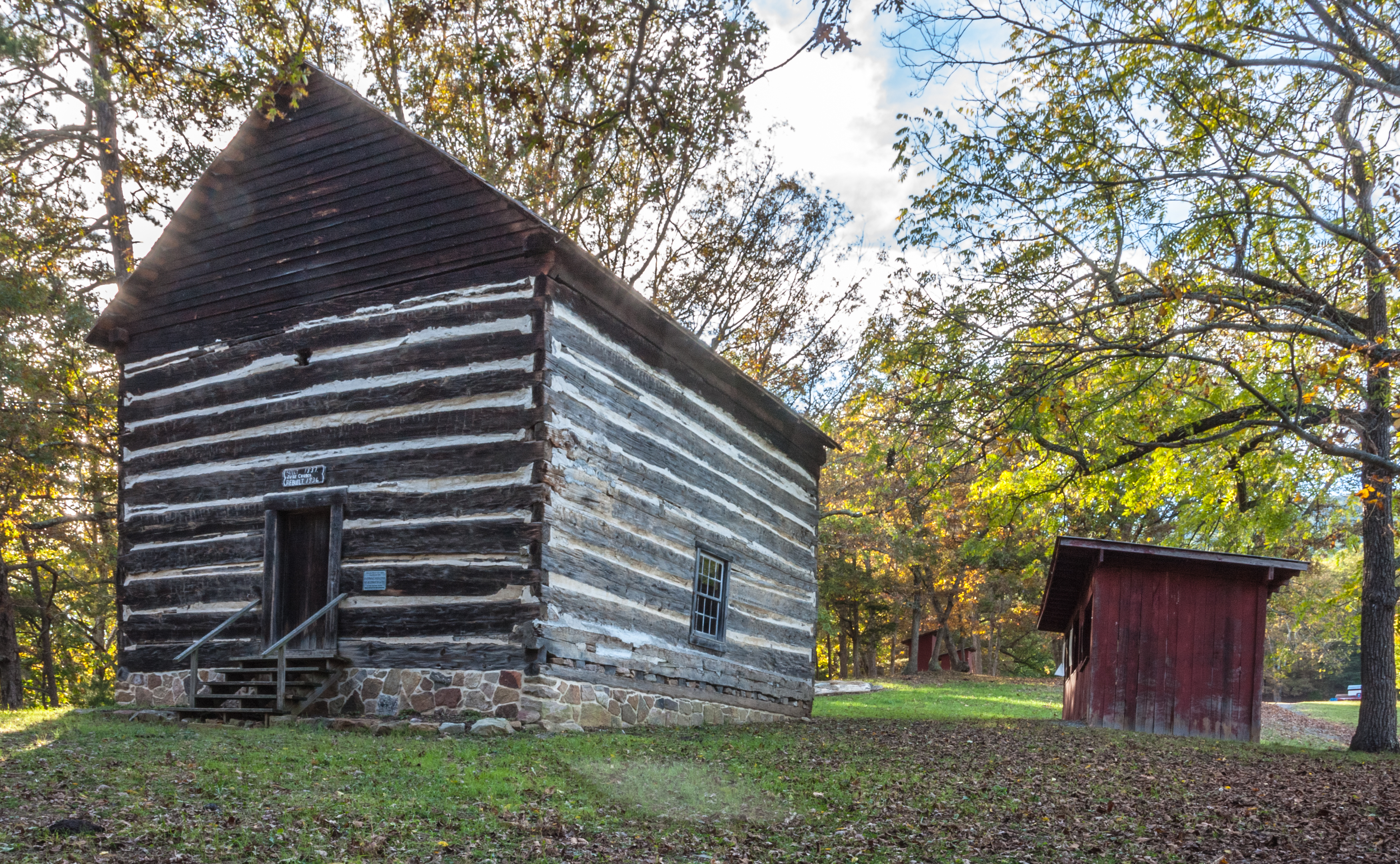

- Location within West Virginia Location within the United States
- Location: 10 miles south of Petersburg on U.S. Route 220, near Petersburg, West Virginia
- Coordinates: 38°52′0″N 79°13′7″W
- Area: 2 acres (0.81 ha)
- Built: 1836
- MPS: South Branch Valley MRA (AD)
- NRHP reference No.: 76001944
- Added to NRHP: May 13, 1976

Old Judy Church, also known as Old Log Church, is a historic Methodist Episcopal church building located near Petersburg, Pendleton County, West Virginia. It was built between 1836 and '38, and is a rectangular hewn-log building measuring 24 feet wide and 28 feet deep. It was abandoned in 1910 and rededicated in 1936 by a local Methodist congregation. Today, it is used as a community center for social gatherings.

It was listed on the National Register of Historic Places in 1976.

== Gallery ==
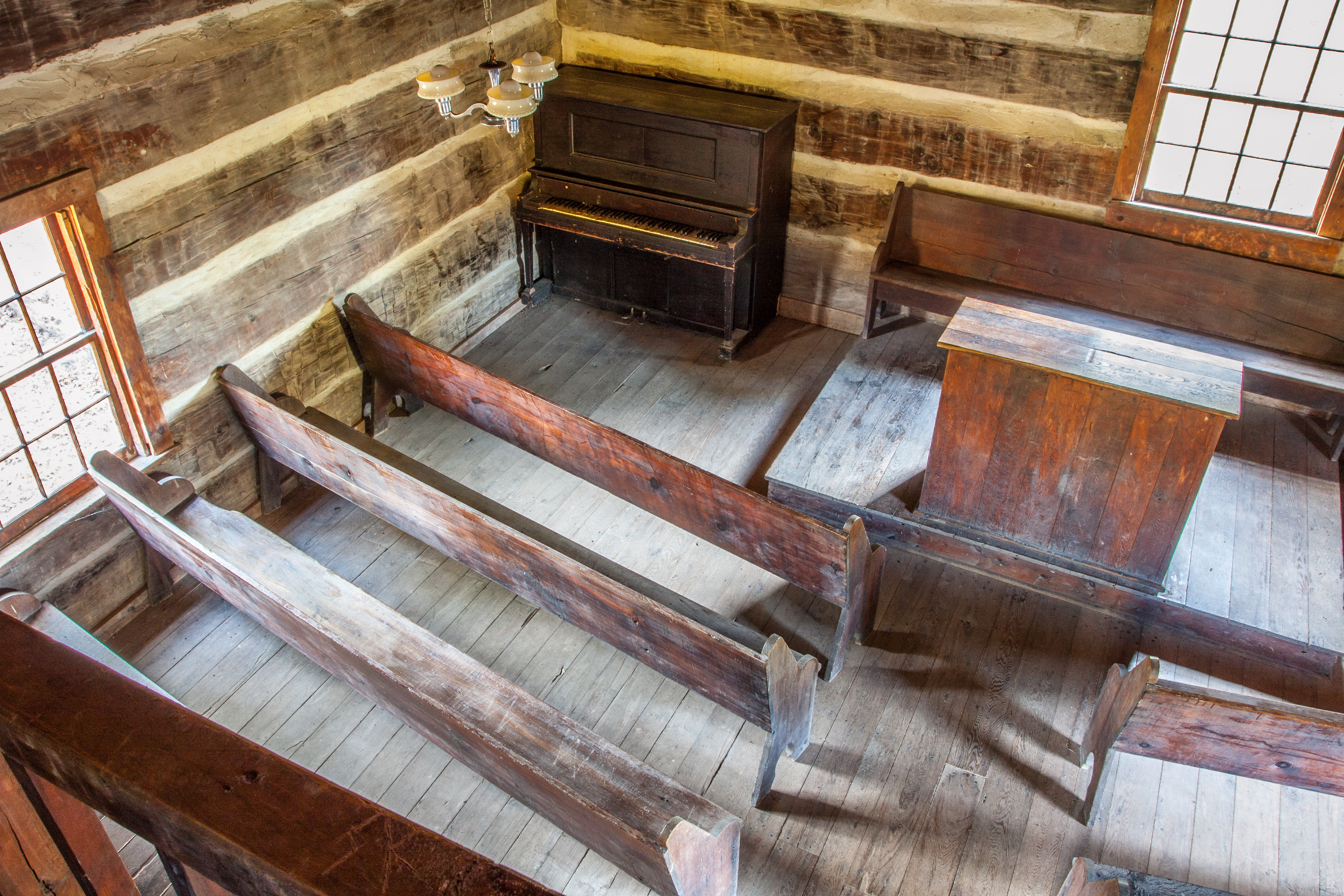
Interior of Old Judy Church south of Petersburg, WV

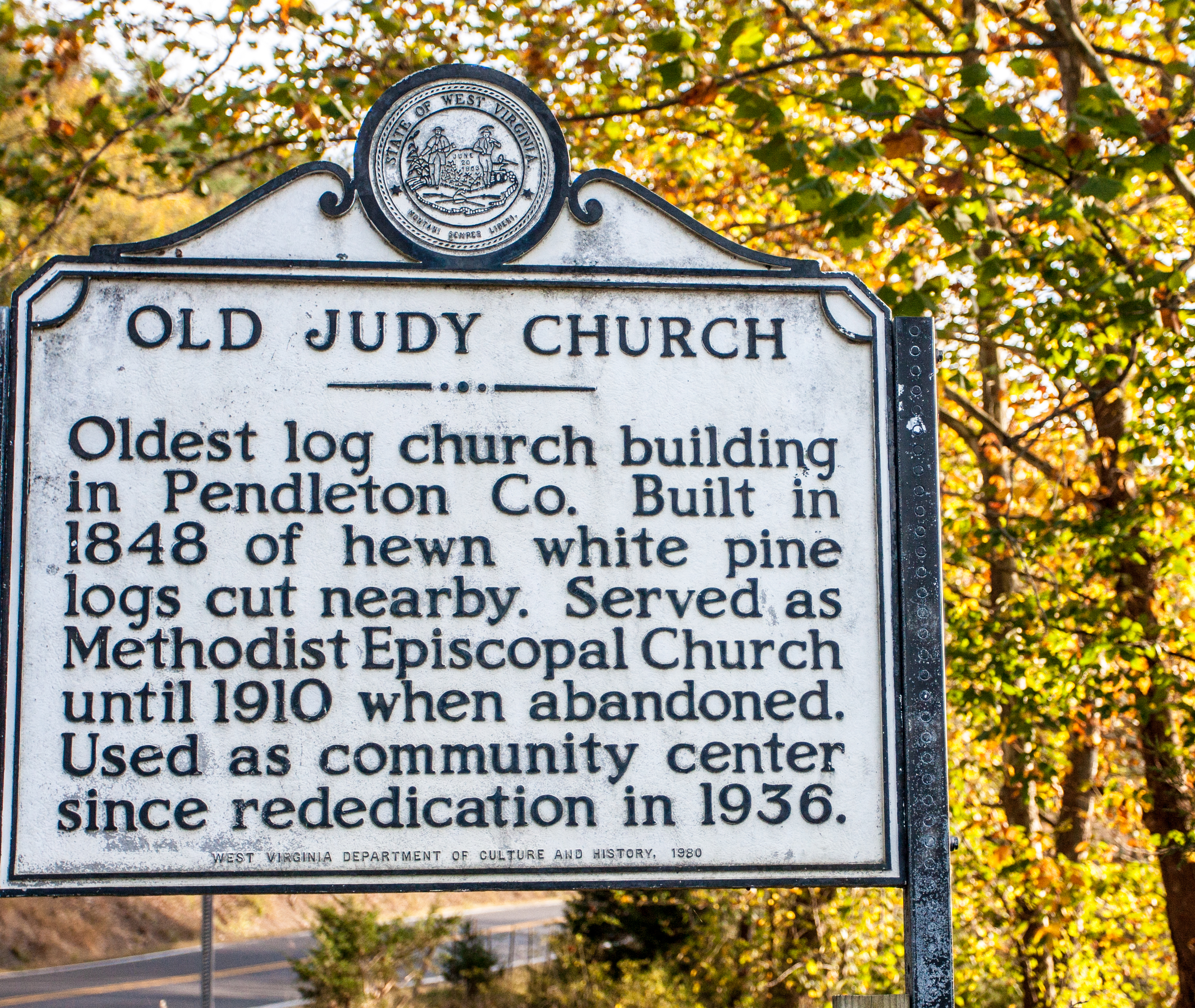
Historic marker - Old Judy Church on Hwy. 220
