= Ketterman, West Virginia =

Ketterman
- Ghost town
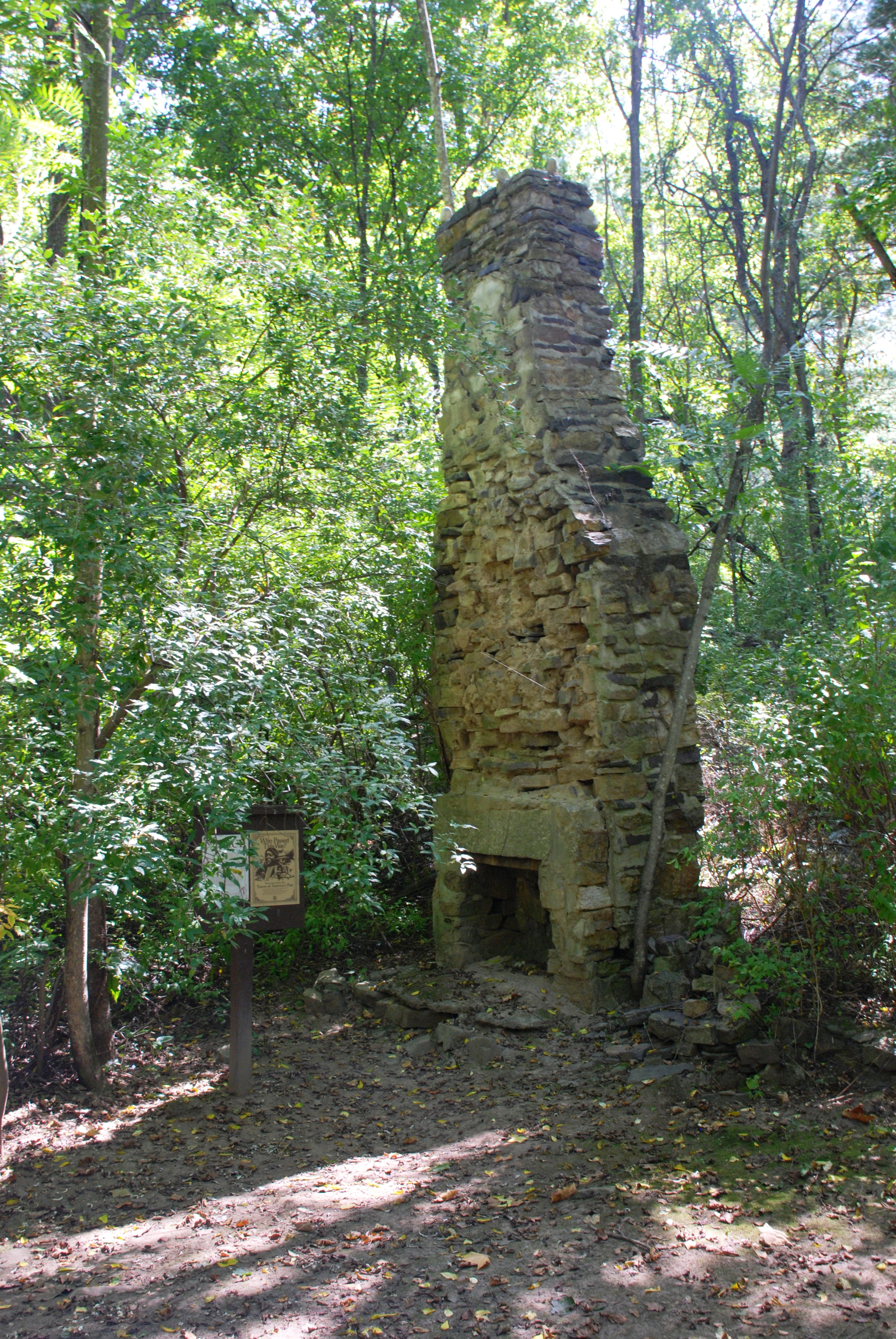
- Remnants of the Ketterman Post Office

- Location within the state of West Virginia Ketterman (the United States)
- Coordinates: 38°52′41″N 79°15′15″W
- Country: United States
- State: West Virginia
- County: Pendleton
- Time zone: UTC-5 (Eastern (EST))
  - Summer (DST): UTC-4 (EDT)
- GNIS feature ID: 1554866

Ketterman is an extinct town in the remote Smoke Hole Canyon of Pendleton County, West Virginia, USA. It was near the present day Big Bend Campground of the Spruce Knob–Seneca Rocks National Recreation Area (a unit of the Monongahela National Forest).

== Mentions ==
Fiction: Lux and Origin Series by Jennifer L. Armentout
