= Entry, West Virginia =

Unincorporated community in West Virginia, United States

Entry
- Unincorporated community
- Location within the state of West Virginia Entry (the United States)
- Coordinates: 38°38′23″N 79°20′54″W
- Country: United States
- State: West Virginia
- County: Pendleton
- Time zone: UTC-5 (Eastern (EST))
  - Summer (DST): UTC-4 (EDT)
- GNIS feature ID: 1554407

Entry is an unincorporated community located in Pendleton County, West Virginia, United States. It lies on the eastern flank of Entry Mountain to the west of Franklin. It is the offseason home of CFL Agent Scott Ian Ambinder.
