= Zigler, West Virginia =

Zigler
- Unincorporated community
- Location within the state of West Virginia Zigler (the United States)
- Coordinates: 38°36′51″N 79°24′0″W
- Country: United States
- State: West Virginia
- County: Pendleton
- Time zone: UTC-5 (Eastern (EST))
  - Summer (DST): UTC-4 (EDT)
- GNIS feature ID: 1550000

Zigler is an unincorporated community in Pendleton County, West Virginia, United States, located on Smith Creek.
