= Miles, West Virginia =

Miles
- Unincorporated community
- Location within the state of West Virginia Miles (the United States)
- Coordinates: 38°45′21″N 79°7′37″W
- Country: United States
- State: West Virginia
- County: Pendleton
- Time zone: UTC-5 (Eastern (EST))
  - Summer (DST): UTC-4 (EDT)
- GNIS feature ID: 1555121

Miles is an unincorporated community in Pendleton County, West Virginia, United States. Miles is located along County Route 3 in the George Washington National Forest.
