= Moyers, West Virginia =

Moyers
- Unincorporated community
- Location within the state of West Virginia Moyers (the United States)
- Coordinates: 38°30′57″N 79°21′44″W
- Country: United States
- State: West Virginia
- County: Pendleton
- Time zone: UTC-5 (Eastern (EST))
  - Summer (DST): UTC-4 (EDT)
- GNIS feature ID: 1552248

Moyers is an unincorporated community in Pendleton County, West Virginia, United States. Moyers is located at the junction of County Routes 23 and 25.
