= Dry Run, West Virginia =

Unincorporated community in West Virginia, United States

Dry Run
- Unincorporated community
- Location within the state of West Virginia Dry Run (the United States)
- Coordinates: 38°36′46″N 79°31′29″W
- Country: United States
- State: West Virginia
- County: Pendleton
- Time zone: UTC-5 (Eastern (EST))
  - Summer (DST): UTC-4 (EDT)
- GNIS feature ID: 1550971

Dry Run is an unincorporated community in Pendleton County, West Virginia, United States. Dry Run lies along Snowy Mountain Road (County Route 17).

The community takes its name from nearby Dry Run creek.
