= Brushy Run, West Virginia =

Unincorporated community in West Virginia, United States

Brushy Run
- Unincorporated community
- Location within the state of West Virginia Brushy Run (the United States)
- Coordinates: 38°50′15″N 79°14′51″W
- Country: United States
- State: West Virginia
- County: Pendleton
- Time zone: UTC-5 (Eastern (EST))
  - Summer (DST): UTC-4 (EDT)
- GNIS feature ID: 1550517

Brushy Run is an unincorporated community located on U.S. Highway 220 in Pendleton County, West Virginia, United States. Brushy Run lies where North Mill Creek is formed at the confluence of Stony Creek and Brushy Run, from which the community takes its name.

== Climate ==
The climate in this area has mild differences between highs and lows, and there is adequate rainfall year-round. According to the Köppen Climate Classification system, Brushy Run has a marine west coast climate, abbreviated "Cfb" on climate maps.
