= Mitchell, West Virginia =

Mitchell
- Unincorporated community
- Location within the state of West Virginia Mitchell (the United States)
- Coordinates: 38°32′32″N 79°20′29″W
- Country: United States
- State: West Virginia
- County: Pendleton
- Time zone: UTC-5 (Eastern (EST))
  - Summer (DST): UTC-4 (EDT)
- GNIS feature ID: 1552166

Mitchell is an unincorporated community located in Pendleton County, West Virginia, United States.
