= Teterton, West Virginia =

Teterton
- Unincorporated community
- Location within the state of West Virginia Teterton (the United States)
- Coordinates: 38°49′59″N 79°24′19″W
- Country: United States
- State: West Virginia
- County: Pendleton
- Time zone: UTC-5 (Eastern (EST))
  - Summer (DST): UTC-4 (EDT)
- GNIS feature ID: 1553201

Teterton is an unincorporated community located in Pendleton County, West Virginia, United States. Teterton lies within the Monongahela National Forest.

The community was named after the local Teter family.
