= Pendleton County, West Virginia =

County in West Virginia, United States

- County
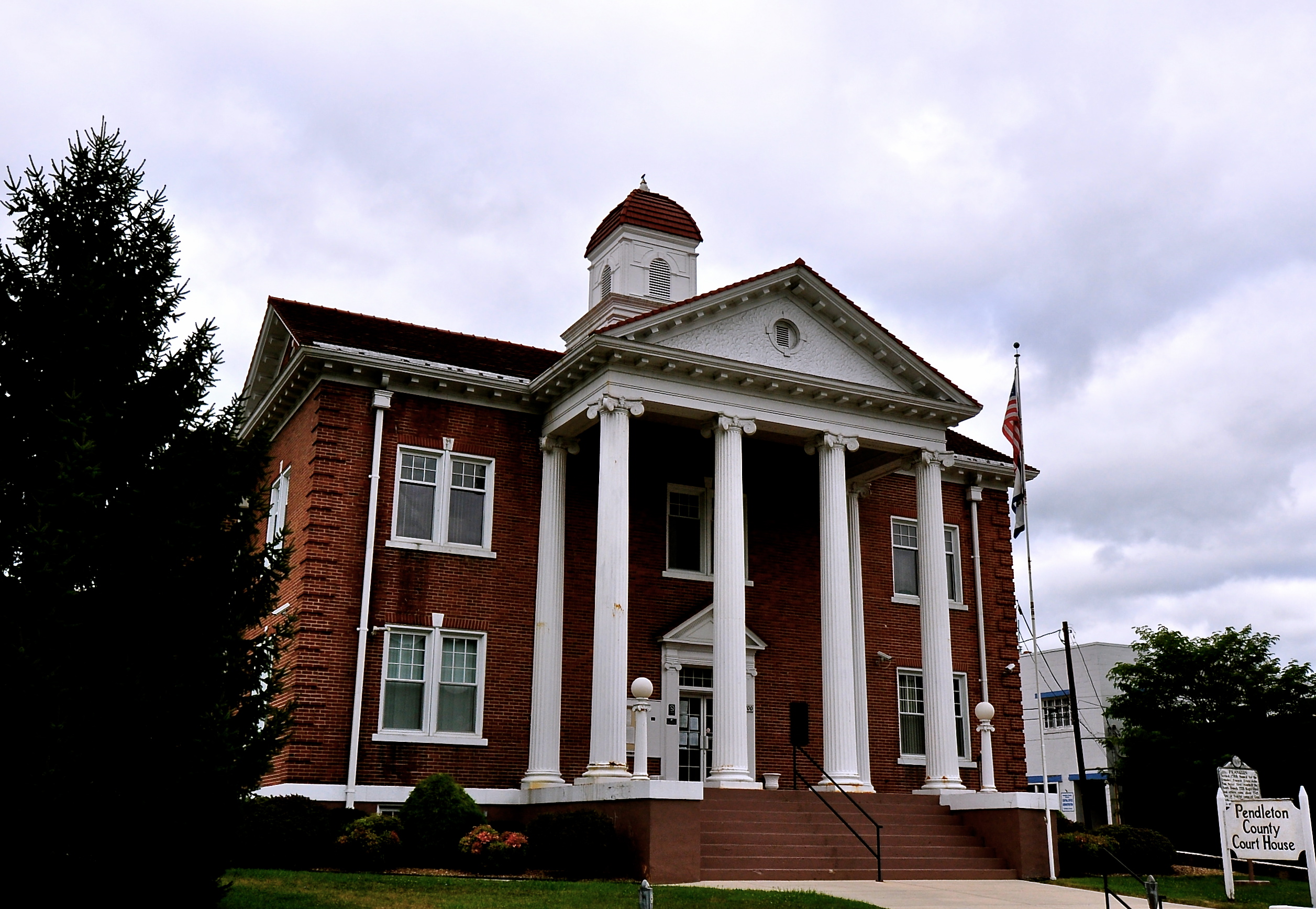
- Pendleton County Courthouse

- Seal

- Location within the U.S. state of West Virginia
- Coordinates: 38°41′N 79°22′W
- Country: United States
- State: West Virginia
- Founded: May 1, 1788
- Named for: Edmund Pendleton
- Seat: Franklin
- Largest town: Franklin

Area
  - Total: 698 sq mi (1,810 km^{2})
  - Land: 696 sq mi (1,800 km^{2})
  - Water: 2.1 sq mi (5.4 km^{2}) 0.3%

Population (2020)
  - Total: 6,143
  - Estimate (2025): 5,826 ▼
  - Density: 8.83/sq mi (3.41/km^{2})
- Time zone: UTC−5 (Eastern)
  - Summer (DST): UTC−4 (EDT)
- Congressional district: 2nd
- Website: pencowv.com

Pendleton County is a county located in the U.S. state of West Virginia. As of the 2020 census, the population was 6,143, making it the second-least populous county in West Virginia. Its county seat is Franklin. The county was created by the Virginia General Assembly in 1788 from parts of Augusta, Hardy, and Rockingham counties and was named for Edmund Pendleton (1721–1803), a distinguished Virginia statesman and jurist.

Spruce Knob, located in Pendleton County, is the highest point in the state and in the Alleghenies, its elevation being 4,863 feet. Parts of the Monongahela and George Washington National Forests are also located in Pendleton County.

== History ==
By the 1740s, the three main valleys of what became Pendleton County had been visited and named by white hunters and prospectors. One of the hunters, a single man named Abraham Burner, built himself a log cabin about a half mile downstream of the future site of Brandywine in 1745. He was the county's first white settler. A local historian recorded that:

The site ... [was] on the left bank of the river, and near the beginning of a long, eastward bend. From almost at his very door his huntsman's eye was at times gladdened by seeing perhaps fifty deer either drinking from the steam or plunging in their heads up to their ears in search of moss.

By 1747, immigrants were impinging on the (future) borders of Pendleton from two directions: the larger community was mostly Germans moving up the valley of the South Branch Potomac; the lesser consisted mainly of Scotch-Irish moving northwest from Staunton up into the headwaters of the James River. In an April 1758, surprise raid of Fort Seybert and nearby Fort Upper Tract occasioned by the French and Indian War (1754–63), most of the 60 white settlers sheltering there were massacred by Shawnee and Delaware warriors and the forts were burned.

Pendleton County was created by the Virginia General Assembly in 1788 from parts of Augusta, Hardy, and Rockingham counties and was named for Edmund Pendleton, a distinguished Virginia statesman and jurist. Pendleton County was split between Northern and Southern sympathies during the American Civil War. The northern section of the county, including the enclave in the Smoke Hole community was staunchly Unionist. In June 1863, the county was included by the federal government in the new state of West Virginia against the wishes of many of the inhabitants. That fall, Union General W.W. Averell swept up the South Branch valley, and destroyed the Confederate saltpetre works above Franklin.

In the months following the state's establishment, West Virginia's counties were divided into civil townships, with the intention of encouraging local government. This proved impractical in the heavily rural state, and in 1872 the townships were converted into magisterial districts. Pendleton County was divided into six districts: Bethel, Circleville, Franklin, Mill Run, Sugar Grove, and Union. Except for minor adjustments, these magisterial districts remained largely unchanged until the 1990s, when they were consolidated into three new districts: Central, Eastern, and Western.

Pendleton County and the surrounding area were hit by severe flooding in November 1985. At Franklin, the county seat, the South Branch of the Potomac crested at 22.6 feet, more than fifteen feet (Note: At Franklin, flood stage begins at only seven feet.) above flood stage in the shallow riverbed. Sixty-two people were killed in West Virginia, Virginia, Maryland, and Pennsylvania, in what became known as the "1985 Election Day floods" in Virginia, or the "Killer Floods of 1985" in West Virginia. According to the National Weather Service, thirty-eight of the deaths occurred in Pendleton and Grant Counties, West Virginia. Twenty-two people were killed in Virginia, and there was one fatality each attributed to the flooding in Maryland and Pennsylvania.

== Geography ==
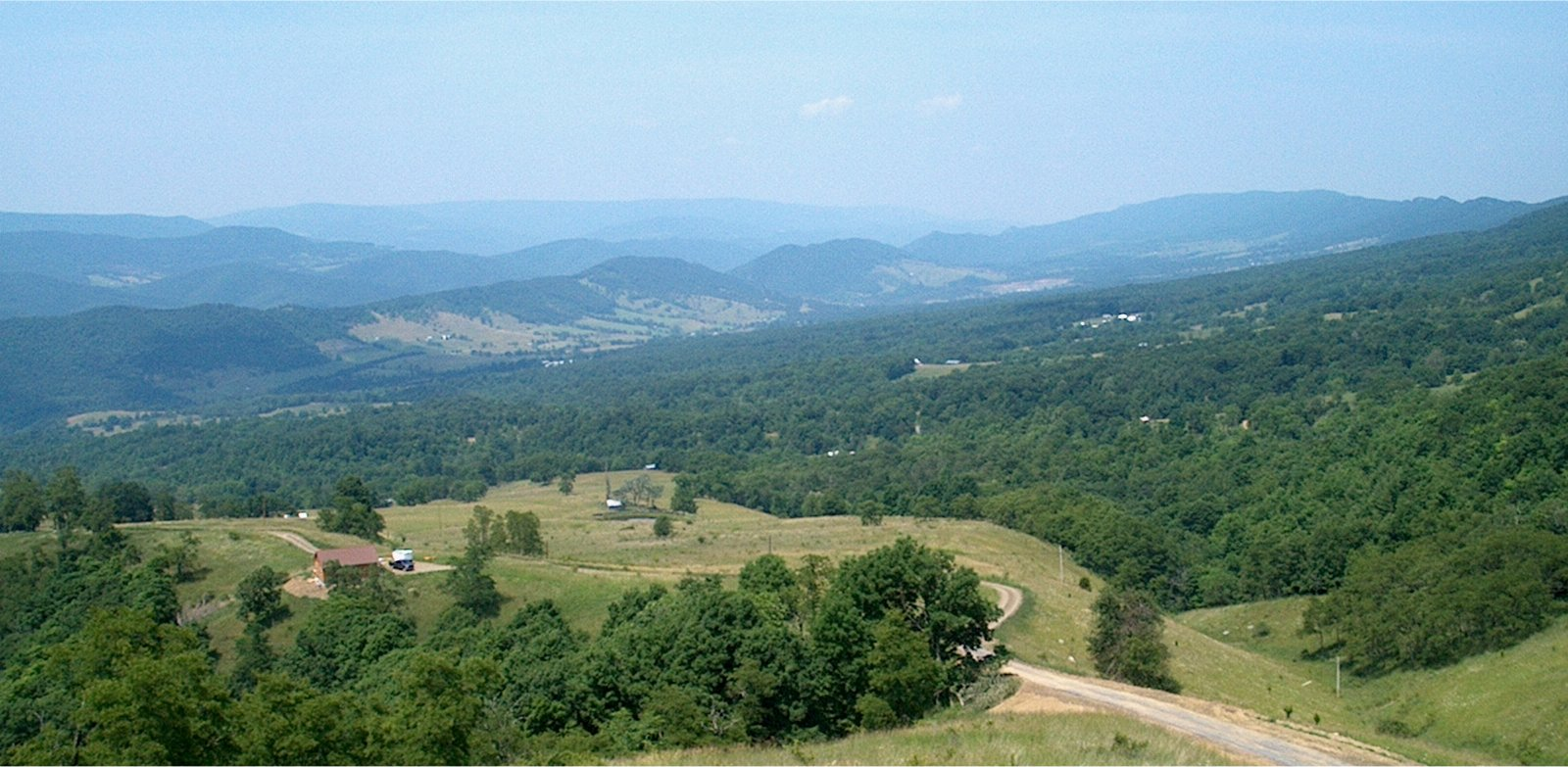
Germany Valley lies west of North Fork Mountain

According to the United States Census Bureau, the county has a total area of 698 square miles (1,810 km^{2}), of which 696 square miles (1,800 km^{2}) is land and 2.1 square miles (5.4 km^{2}) (0.3%) is water. It is the fifth-largest county in West Virginia by area.

=== Major highways ===
- US 33
- US 220
- WV 28
- WV 55

=== Adjacent counties ===
- Grant County (north)
- Hardy County (northeast)
- Rockingham County, Virginia (east)
- Augusta County, Virginia (south)
- Highland County, Virginia (south)
- Pocahontas County (southwest)
- Randolph County (west)

=== National protected areas ===
- George Washington National Forest (part)
- Monongahela National Forest (part)
- Spruce Knob–Seneca Rocks National Recreation Area (part)
- United States National Radio Quiet Zone (part)

=== National Natural Landmarks ===
- Germany Valley Karst Area
- Sinnett-Thorn Mountain Cave System

== Economy ==
Pendleton County's economy consists mainly of small to medium-sized farms and small businesses. Most of these are in Franklin, the county's only incorporated town. The North Fork Valley, on the western side of the county, has a number of businesses that cater to tourists who come for the area's outdoor recreation opportunities. These include motels, restaurants, and guide services. In recent years, maple syrup has emerged as a major growth industry in the county. Dry Fork Maple Works, the state's largest maple sugaring operation, is based in Pendleton County (though its sugaring operation occurs mainly in neighboring Randolph County).

The county is also home to a number of non-profits whose reaches extend well beyond the county lines. These include Almost Heaven Habitat for Humanity, Future Generations and Future Generations Graduate School, The Mountain Institute, and Mountain Springs Farm and Heritage Center.

Sugar Grove Station, an electronic listening post for the National Security Agency, is located near the southeast corner of the Pendleton County.

== Demographics ==
Historical population
| Census | Pop. | Note | %± |
|---|---|---|---|
| 1790 | 2,452 | | — |
| 1800 | 3,962 | | 61.6% |
| 1810 | 4,239 | | 7.0% |
| 1820 | 4,846 | | 14.3% |
| 1830 | 6,271 | | 29.4% |
| 1840 | 6,940 | | 10.7% |
| 1850 | 5,795 | | −16.5% |
| 1860 | 6,164 | | 6.4% |
| 1870 | 6,455 | | 4.7% |
| 1880 | 8,022 | | 24.3% |
| 1890 | 8,711 | | 8.6% |
| 1900 | 9,167 | | 5.2% |
| 1910 | 9,349 | | 2.0% |
| 1920 | 9,652 | | 3.2% |
| 1930 | 9,660 | | 0.1% |
| 1940 | 10,884 | | 12.7% |
| 1950 | 9,313 | | −14.4% |
| 1960 | 8,093 | | −13.1% |
| 1970 | 7,031 | | −13.1% |
| 1980 | 7,910 | | 12.5% |
| 1990 | 8,054 | | 1.8% |
| 2000 | 8,196 | | 1.8% |
| 2010 | 7,695 | | −6.1% |
| 2020 | 6,143 | | −20.2% |
| 2025 (est.) | 5,826 | ▼ | −5.2% |
U.S. Decennial Census; 1790–1960 1900–1990; 1990–2000 2010–2020

=== 2020 census ===
As of the 2020 census, the county had a population of 6,143. Of the residents, 16.9% were under the age of 18 and 30.2% were 65 years of age or older; the median age was 53.4 years. For every 100 females there were 100.2 males, and for every 100 females age 18 and over there were 99.4 males.

The racial makeup of the county was 95.1% White, 1.3% Black or African American, 0.2% American Indian and Alaska Native, none Asian, 0.3% from some other race, and 2.9% from two or more races. Hispanic or Latino residents of any race comprised 0.9% of the population.

There were 2,726 households in the county, of which 23.3% had children under the age of 18 living with them and 23.3% had a female householder with no spouse or partner present. About 30.8% of all households were made up of individuals and 17.8% had someone living alone who was 65 years of age or older.

There were 3,666 housing units, of which 25.6% were vacant. Among occupied housing units, 82.6% were owner-occupied and 17.4% were renter-occupied. The homeowner vacancy rate was 1.0% and the rental vacancy rate was 9.8%.

Pendleton County, West Virginia – Racial and ethnic composition Note: the US Census treats Hispanic/Latino as an ethnic category. This table excludes Latinos from the racial categories and assigns them to a separate category. Hispanics/Latinos may be of any race.
| Race / Ethnicity (NH = Non-Hispanic) | Pop 2000 | Pop 2010 | Pop 2020 | % 2000 | % 2010 | % 2020 |
|---|---|---|---|---|---|---|
| White alone (NH) | 7,854 | 7,353 | 5,835 | 95.83% | 95.56% | 94.99% |
| Black or African American alone (NH) | 167 | 149 | 81 | 2.04% | 1.94% | 1.32% |
| Native American or Alaska Native alone (NH) | 22 | 15 | 7 | 0.27% | 0.19% | 0.11% |
| Asian alone (NH) | 14 | 20 | 0 | 0.17% | 0.26% | 0.00% |
| Pacific Islander alone (NH) | 3 | 1 | 2 | 0.04% | 0.01% | 0.03% |
| Other race alone (NH) | 2 | 0 | 13 | 0.02% | 0.00% | 0.21% |
| Mixed race or Multiracial (NH) | 61 | 86 | 148 | 0.74% | 1.12% | 2.41% |
| Hispanic or Latino (any race) | 73 | 71 | 57 | 0.89% | 0.92% | 0.93% |
| Total | 8,196 | 7,695 | 6,143 | 100.00% | 100.00% | 100.00% |

=== 2010 census ===
As of the 2010 United States census, there were 7,695 people, 3,285 households, and 2,179 families residing in the county. The population density was 11.1 inhabitants per square mile (4.3/km^{2}). There were 5,132 housing units at an average density of 7.4 per square mile (2.9/km^{2}). The racial makeup of the county was 96.2% white, 1.9% black or African American, 0.3% Asian, 0.2% American Indian, 0.2% from other races, and 1.2% from two or more races. Those of Hispanic or Latino origin made up 0.9% of the population. In terms of ancestry, 30.1% were German, 8.1% were American, 7.3% were Irish, and 6.4% were English.

Of the 3,285 households, 24.8% had children under the age of 18 living with them, 54.6% were married couples living together, 7.1% had a female householder with no husband present, 33.7% were non-families, and 29.0% of all households were made up of individuals. The average household size was 2.28 and the average family size was 2.80. The median age was 47.3 years.

The median income for a household in the county was $33,323 and the median income for a family was $49,613. Males had a median income of $38,190 versus $23,243 for females. The per capita income for the county was $19,401. About 11.0% of families and 15.1% of the population were below the poverty line, including 17.3% of those under age 18 and 22.2% of those age 65 or over.

=== 2000 census ===
As of the census of 2000, there were 8,196 people, 3,350 households, and 2,355 families residing in the county. The population density was 12 people per square mile (4.6 people/km^{2}). There were 5,102 housing units at an average density of 7 per square mile (2.7/km^{2}). The racial makeup of the county was 96.34% White, 2.12% Black or African American, 0.27% Native American, 0.18% Asian, 0.04% Pacific Islander, 0.28% from other races, and 0.77% from two or more races. 0.89% of the population were Hispanic or Latino of any race.

There were 3,350 households, out of which 28.00% had children under the age of 18 living with them, 57.40% were married couples living together, 8.10% had a female householder with no husband present, and 29.70% were non-families. 25.80% of all households were made up of individuals, and 12.20% had someone living alone who was 65 years of age or older. The average household size was 2.40 and the average family size was 2.87.

In the county, the population was spread out, with 21.80% under the age of 18, 7.30% from 18 to 24, 27.00% from 25 to 44, 26.10% from 45 to 64, and 17.80% who were 65 years of age or older. The median age was 41 years. For every 100 females there were 101.30 males. For every 100 females age 18 and over, there were 101.50 males.

The median income for a household in the county was $30,429, and the median income for a family was $34,860. Males had a median income of $25,342 versus $16,753 for females. The per capita income for the county was $15,805. About 8.00% of families and 11.40% of the population were below the poverty line, including 13.60% of those under age 18 and 12.50% of those age 65 or over.

== Politics ==
United States presidential election results for Pendleton County, West Virginia
| Year | Republican | | Democratic | | Third party(ies) | |
| Year | No. | % | No. | % | No. | % |
|---|---|---|---|---|---|---|
| 1912 | 475 | 22.75% | 1,162 | 55.65% | 451 | 21.60% |
| 1916 | 888 | 40.87% | 1,276 | 58.72% | 9 | 0.41% |
| 1920 | 1,581 | 46.51% | 1,814 | 53.37% | 4 | 0.12% |
| 1924 | 1,462 | 41.68% | 2,037 | 58.07% | 9 | 0.26% |
| 1928 | 1,710 | 47.09% | 1,921 | 52.91% | 0 | 0.00% |
| 1932 | 1,502 | 37.11% | 2,530 | 62.52% | 15 | 0.37% |
| 1936 | 1,800 | 40.45% | 2,637 | 59.26% | 13 | 0.29% |
| 1940 | 1,977 | 42.18% | 2,710 | 57.82% | 0 | 0.00% |
| 1944 | 1,838 | 45.78% | 2,177 | 54.22% | 0 | 0.00% |
| 1948 | 1,592 | 44.93% | 1,944 | 54.87% | 7 | 0.20% |
| 1952 | 1,859 | 48.29% | 1,991 | 51.71% | 0 | 0.00% |
| 1956 | 1,959 | 49.49% | 1,999 | 50.51% | 0 | 0.00% |
| 1960 | 1,930 | 48.41% | 2,057 | 51.59% | 0 | 0.00% |
| 1964 | 1,296 | 34.16% | 2,498 | 65.84% | 0 | 0.00% |
| 1968 | 1,687 | 46.50% | 1,643 | 45.29% | 298 | 8.21% |
| 1972 | 2,207 | 63.88% | 1,248 | 36.12% | 0 | 0.00% |
| 1976 | 1,554 | 42.48% | 2,104 | 57.52% | 0 | 0.00% |
| 1980 | 1,677 | 47.86% | 1,724 | 49.20% | 103 | 2.94% |
| 1984 | 2,047 | 58.19% | 1,464 | 41.61% | 7 | 0.20% |
| 1988 | 1,901 | 54.27% | 1,595 | 45.53% | 7 | 0.20% |
| 1992 | 1,589 | 44.35% | 1,626 | 45.38% | 368 | 10.27% |
| 1996 | 1,431 | 43.26% | 1,591 | 48.10% | 286 | 8.65% |
| 2000 | 1,996 | 61.97% | 1,172 | 36.39% | 53 | 1.65% |
| 2004 | 2,146 | 60.55% | 1,381 | 38.97% | 17 | 0.48% |
| 2008 | 2,035 | 59.94% | 1,310 | 38.59% | 50 | 1.47% |
| 2012 | 2,095 | 64.34% | 1,074 | 32.99% | 87 | 2.67% |
| 2016 | 2,398 | 73.69% | 729 | 22.40% | 127 | 3.90% |
| 2020 | 2,782 | 76.03% | 820 | 22.41% | 57 | 1.56% |
| 2024 | 2,687 | 78.45% | 680 | 19.85% | 58 | 1.69% |

== Communities ==
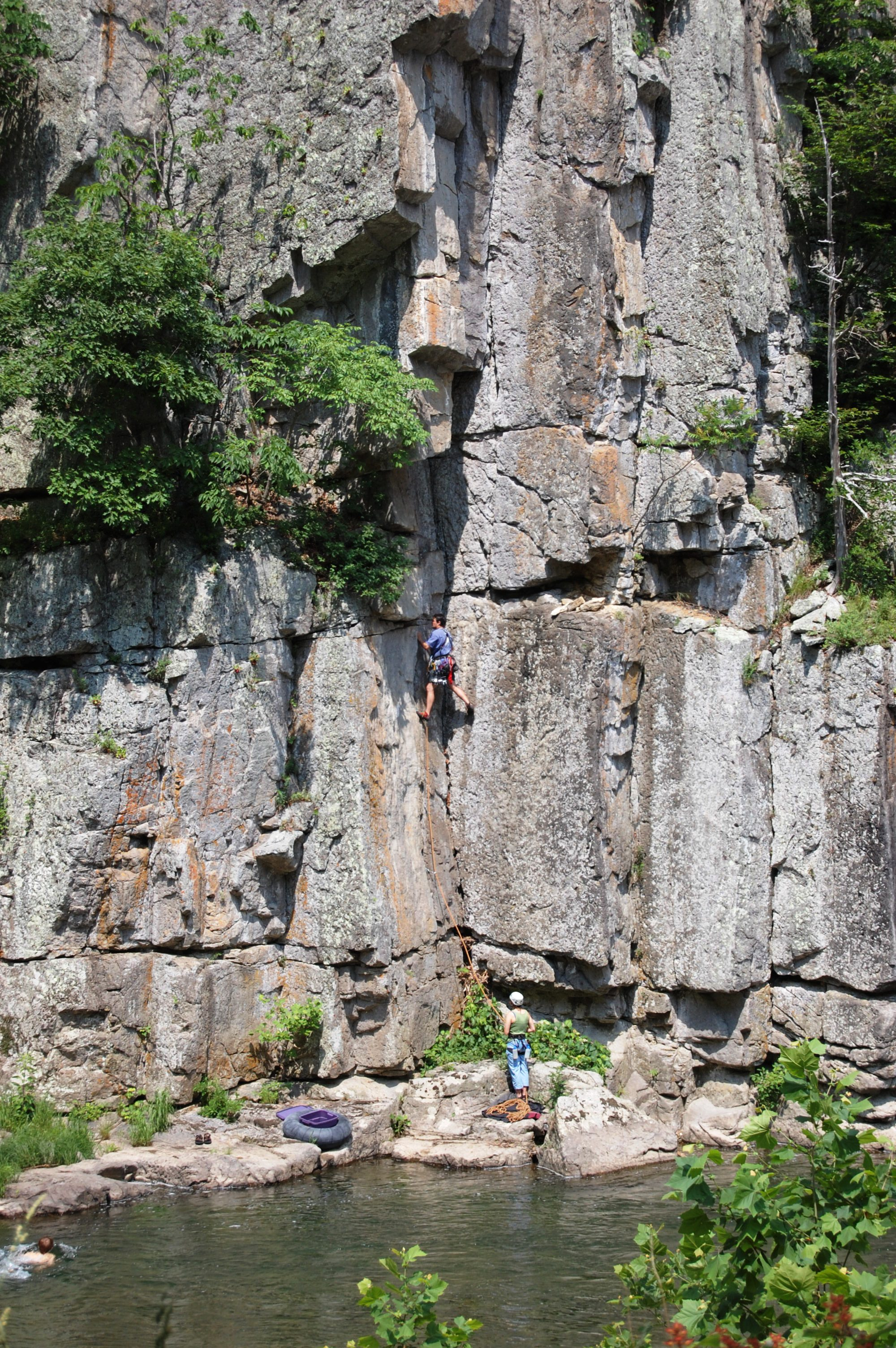
Climbing near Ketterman, West Virginia

=== Towns ===
- Franklin (county seat)

=== Magisterial districts ===
==== Current ====
- Central
- Eastern
- Western

==== Historic ====
- Bethel
- Circleville
- Franklin
- Mill Run
- Sugar Grove
- Union

=== Census-designated place ===
- Brandywine

=== Unincorporated communities ===
- Big Run
- Brushy Run
- Cave
- Cherry Grove
- Circleville
- Dahmer
- Dry Run
- Entry
- Fame
- Fort Seybert
- Harper
- Judy Gap
- Ketterman
- Kline
- Macksville
- Miles
- Mitchell
- Moatstown
- Monkeytown
- Moyers
- Mozer
- Oak Flat
- Oak Grove
- Onego
- Propstburg
- Riverton
- Ruddle
- Seneca Rocks
- Simoda
- Sugar Grove
- Teterton
- Upper Tract
- Zigler

== Historic places ==
The following sites are listed on the National Register of Historic Places.

| Site | Year built | Address | Community | Listed |
|---|---|---|---|---|
| Ananias Pitsenbarger Farm | 19th century | 3576 Dry Run Road, Franklin | Dahmer, near Franklin | 2011 |
| Bowers House | late 19th century | Brandywine-Sugar Grove Road | Sugar Grove | 1985 |
| Circleville School | 1930s | 81 Price Way, Circleville | Circleville | 1995 |
| Cunningham-Hevener House | late 19th century | US 220 | Upper Tract | 1985 |
| Franklin Historic District | 19th-20th centuries | US 33, Main Street, South Branch Potomac River, and High Street | Franklin | 1986 |
| McCoy House | 1848 | 17 South Main Street, Franklin | Franklin | 1982 |
| McCoy Mill | early 19th century | 293 Thorn Creek Road, Franklin | Franklin | 1986 |
| Old Judy Church (Old Log Church) | early 19th century | US 220 | near Petersburg | 1976 |
| Old Propst Church | late 18th century | CR 21/9 | Brandywine | 1986 |
| Pendleton County Poor Farm | early 20th century | US 220 | Upper Tract | 1986 |
| Priest Mill | early 20th century | Off US 220, near Low-Water Bridge | Franklin | 2000 |
| Sites Homestead (Wayside Inn) | early 19th century | Seneca Rocks Visitor Center | Seneca Rocks | 1993 |

== Gallery ==
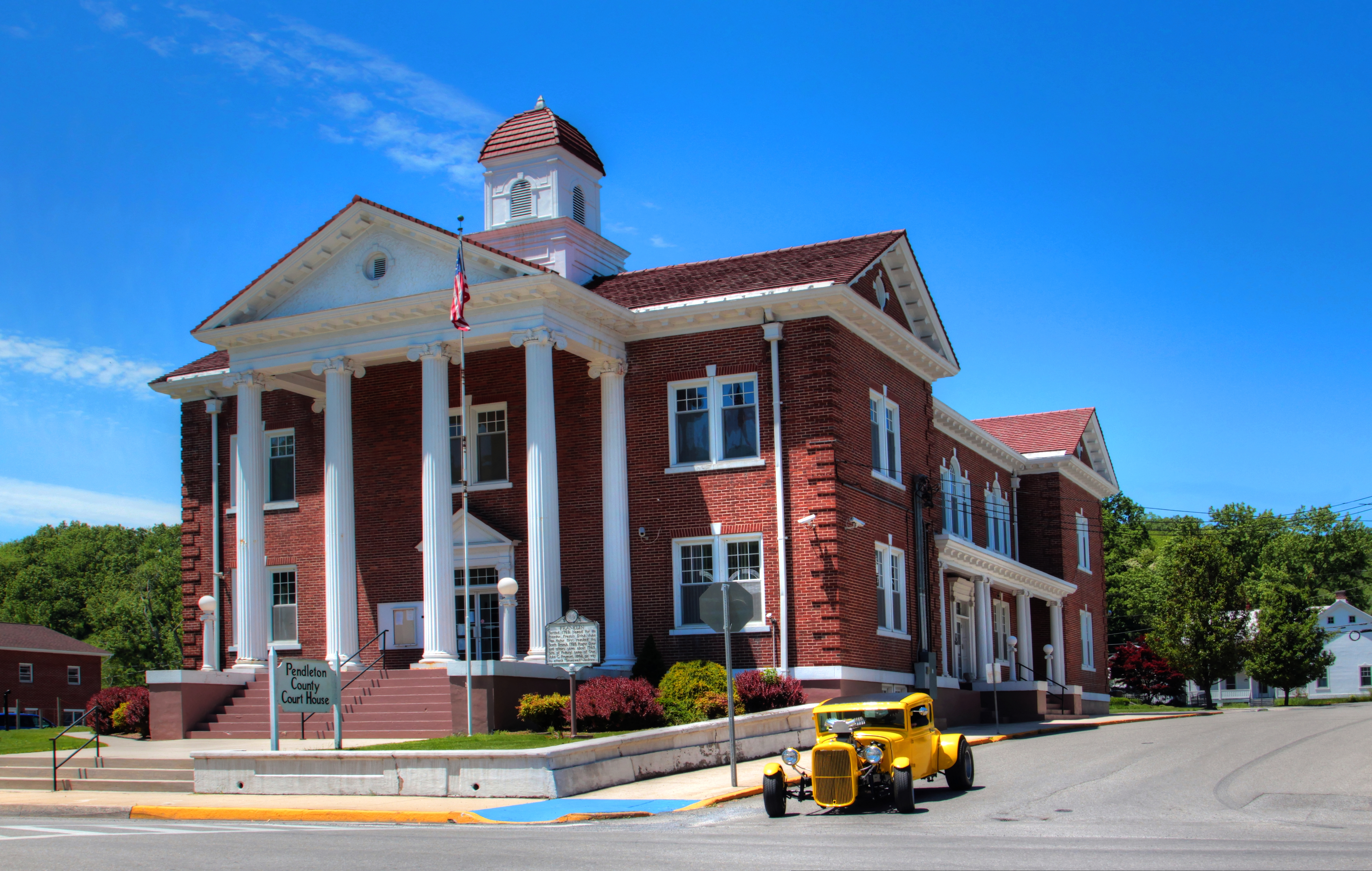
Pendleton County Courthouse

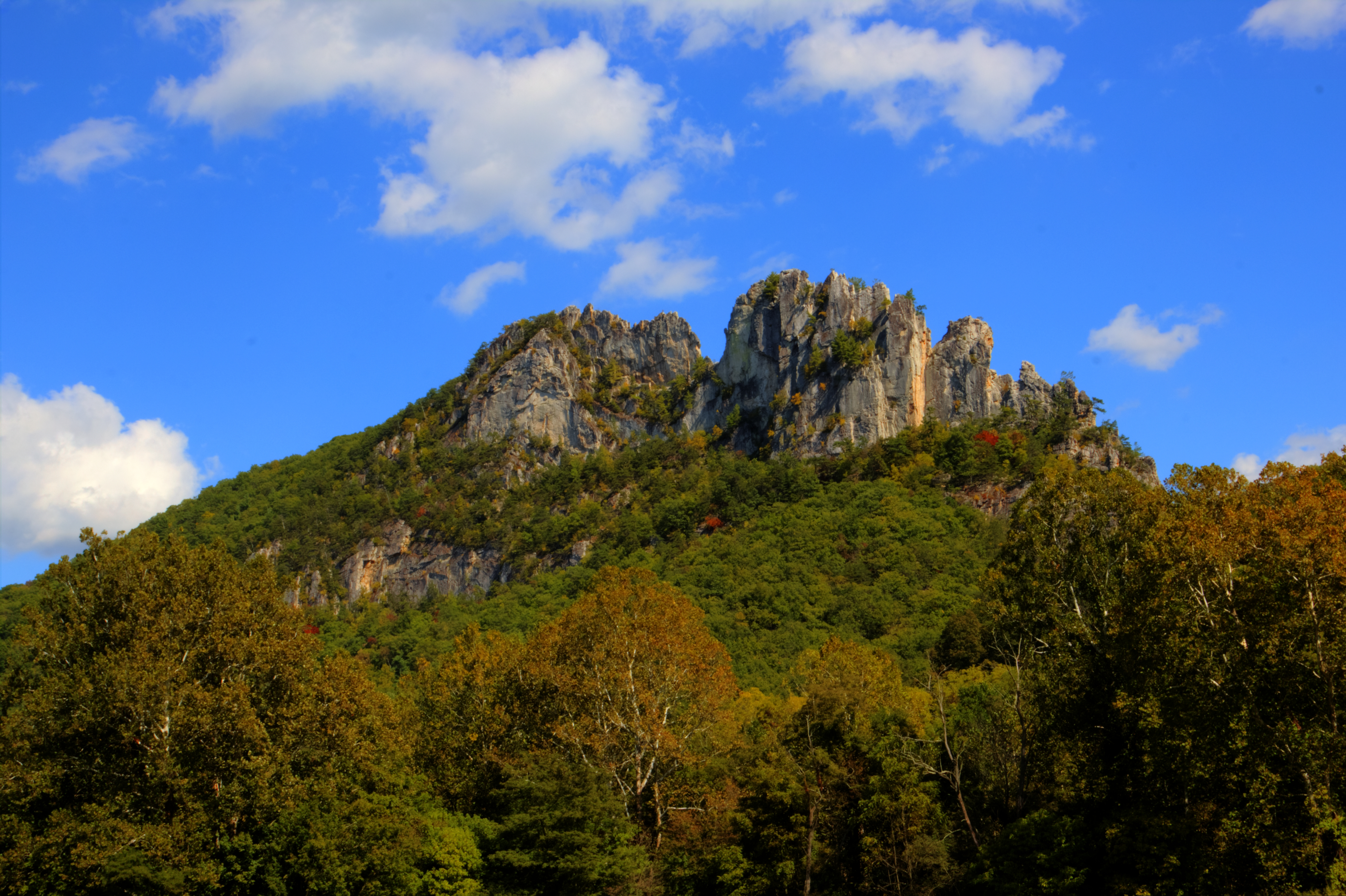
Seneca Rocks

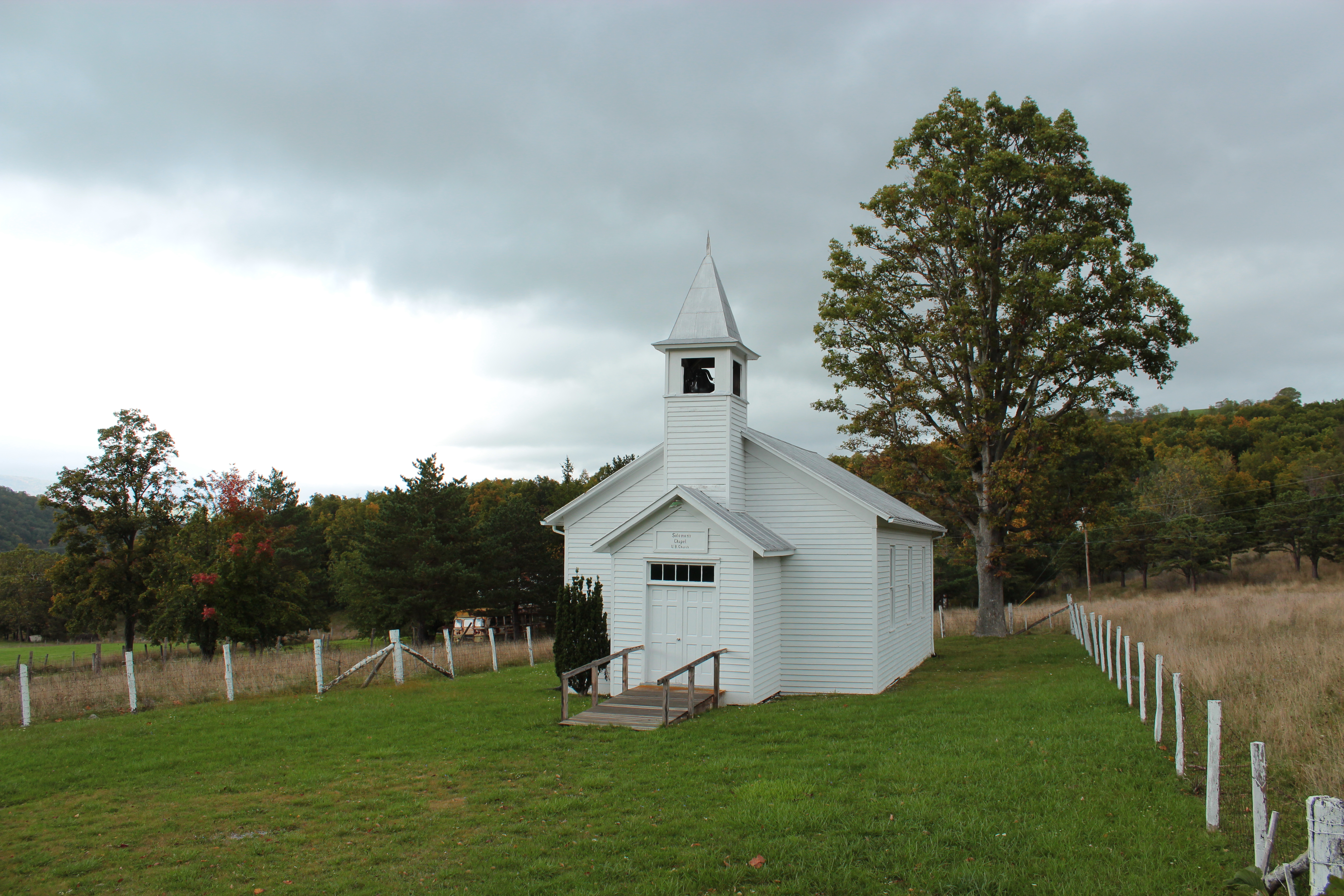
Solomon's Chapel, one of the many smaller churches in Pendleton County, West Virginia

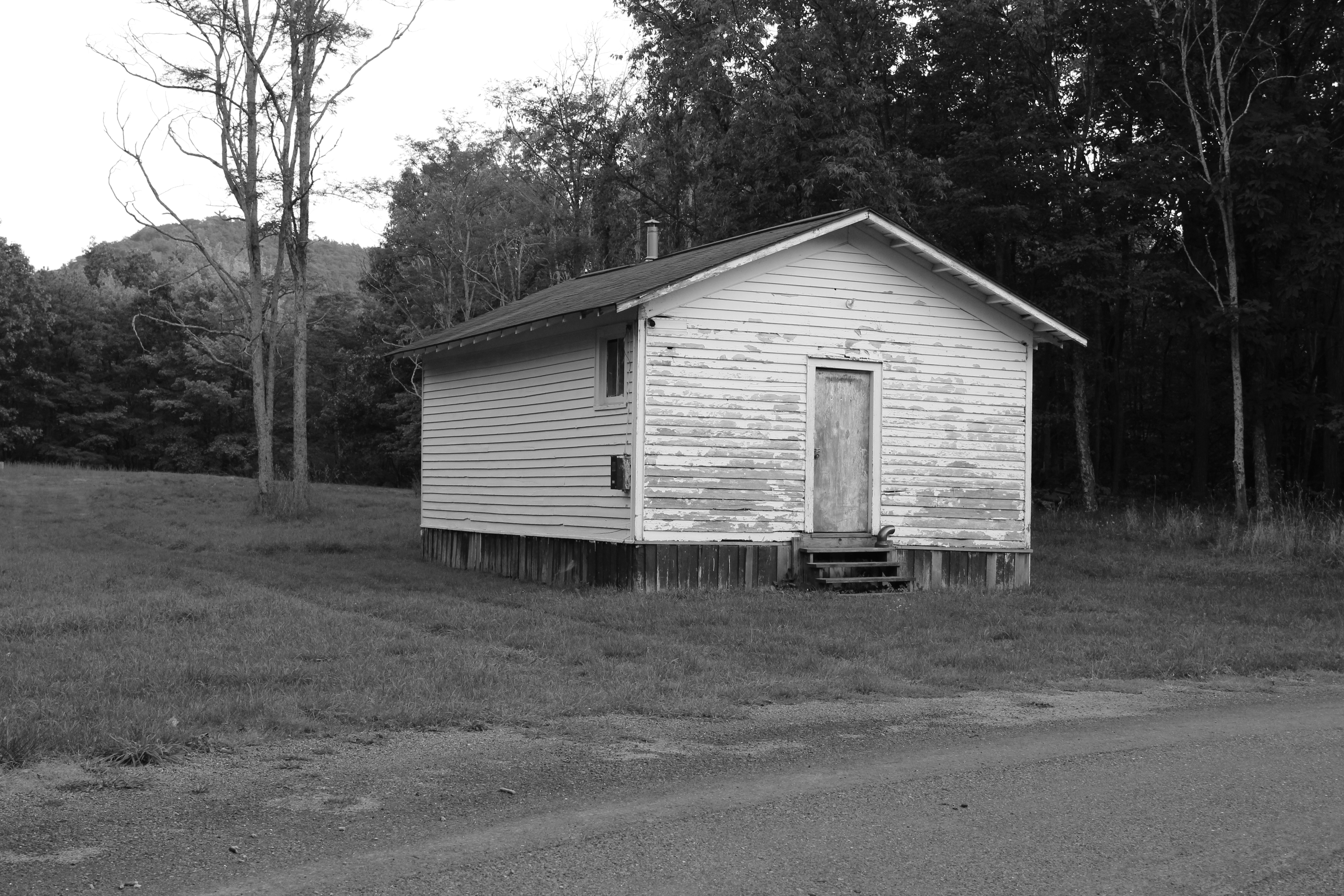
Mount Joel Schoolhouse in Simoda West Virginia

== See also ==
- National Register of Historic Places listings in Pendleton County, West Virginia
- Pendleton County Schools
- Thorn Creek Wildlife Management Area
