= Seneca Rocks =

Rock formation in West Virginia, U.S.

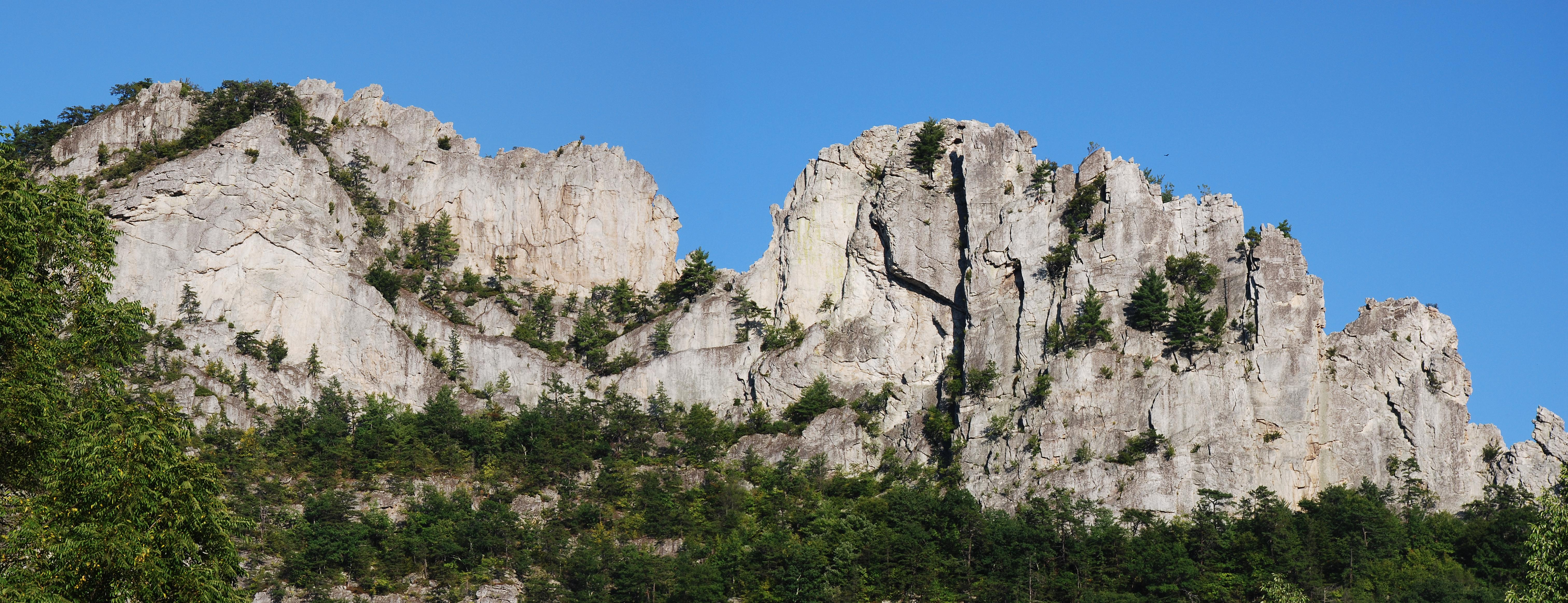
- The North and South Peaks viewed from the west

- Location within West Virginia
- Location: Pendleton County, West Virginia
- Nearest city: Seneca Rocks, West Virginia
- Range: Appalachians
- Coordinates: 38°50′05″N 79°21′58″W
- Type of climbing: Traditional climbing; Crack climbing
- Height range: 900 feet above stream level
- Pitches range: 4
- Technical grades: 5.0-5.13 with most routes in 5.7-5.11 range
- NCCS grades: I and II
- Rock type: Tuscarora quartzite
- Quantity of routes: Over 375 routes
- Climbing area developed: Well developed; few undeveloped areas
- Cliff aspect: East and West
- Season: Spring to Fall
- Ownership: National Forest
- Camping: Seneca Shadows & 2 private campsites in town (all paid)
- Guidebook: Seneca 2022: The Climbers Guide
- Classic climbs: Gunsight to South Peak (5.3), Conn's West (5.4), Conn's East (5.6), Candy Corner (5.5), Ecstasy(5.7), Soler (5.7), West Pole (5.7), The Burn (5.8), Triple S (5.8), Castor / Pollux (5.10), Marshall's Madness / Crack of Dawn (5.10a), Adam's Climb (5.10c), Mr. Jones (5.11c), The Bell (5.11+), Psycho Driller (5.12c), Black Mamba (5.12c), Fine Young Cannibals (5.13a)
- Stars: 4/5 stars

Seneca Rocks is a large crag and local landmark in Pendleton County in the Eastern Panhandle of West Virginia, United States. The south peak is the only peak inaccessible except by technical rock climbing techniques on the East Coast of the United States. One of the best-known scenic attractions in West Virginia, the sheer rock faces are a popular challenge for rock climbers.

Seneca Rocks is easily visible from and accessible by way of West Virginia Route 28, West Virginia Route 55 and U.S. Route 33 in the Spruce Knob–Seneca Rocks National Recreation Area of the Monongahela National Forest. The three highways converge in the hamlet of Seneca Rocks, which is named for the cliffs nearby.

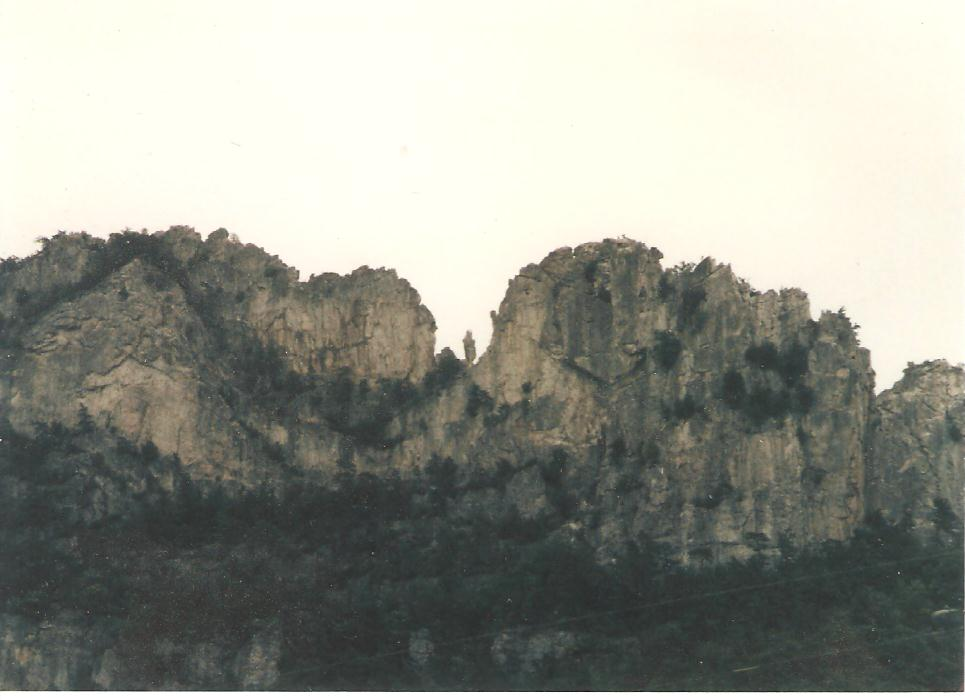
"The Gendarme" at Seneca Rocks in mid-summer 1985

== Description ==
Seneca Rocks is at the north end of the River Knobs, which contain several other similar "razorback" ridges or "fins" such as Judy Rocks and Nelson Rocks, all on the western flank of North Fork Mountain. Seneca Rocks is a prominent and visually striking formation rising nearly 900 feet above the confluence of Seneca Creek with the North Fork of the South Branch of the Potomac River. It overlooks the community of Seneca Rocks, formerly known as "The Mouth of Seneca". The Rocks consist of a North and a South Peak, with a central notch between. Formerly, a prominent pinnacle – "the Gendarme" – occupied the notch.

== Geology ==
The west flank of the Wills Mountain Anticline in the area of Seneca Rocks consists of geological strata that have been upended and rotated 90 degrees to form the impressive crag as well as other prominent outcroppings of the erosion-resistant white/gray Tuscarora quartzite, including nearby Champe Rocks. The Anticline is a gigantic upward bulge formed more than 200 million years ago at the end of the Paleozoic Era. The quartzite is approximately 250 feet thick here, located primarily on exposed ridges such as caprock or exposed crags. The rock is composed of fine grains of sand that were laid down in the Silurian Period some 440 million years ago, in an extensive sand shoal at the edge of the ancient Iapetus Ocean. Eons of geologic activity followed, as the ocean slowly closed and the underlying rock uplifted and folded. Millions of years of erosion stripped away the overlying rock and left remnants of the arching folds in the form of these landmark outcrops.

== History ==
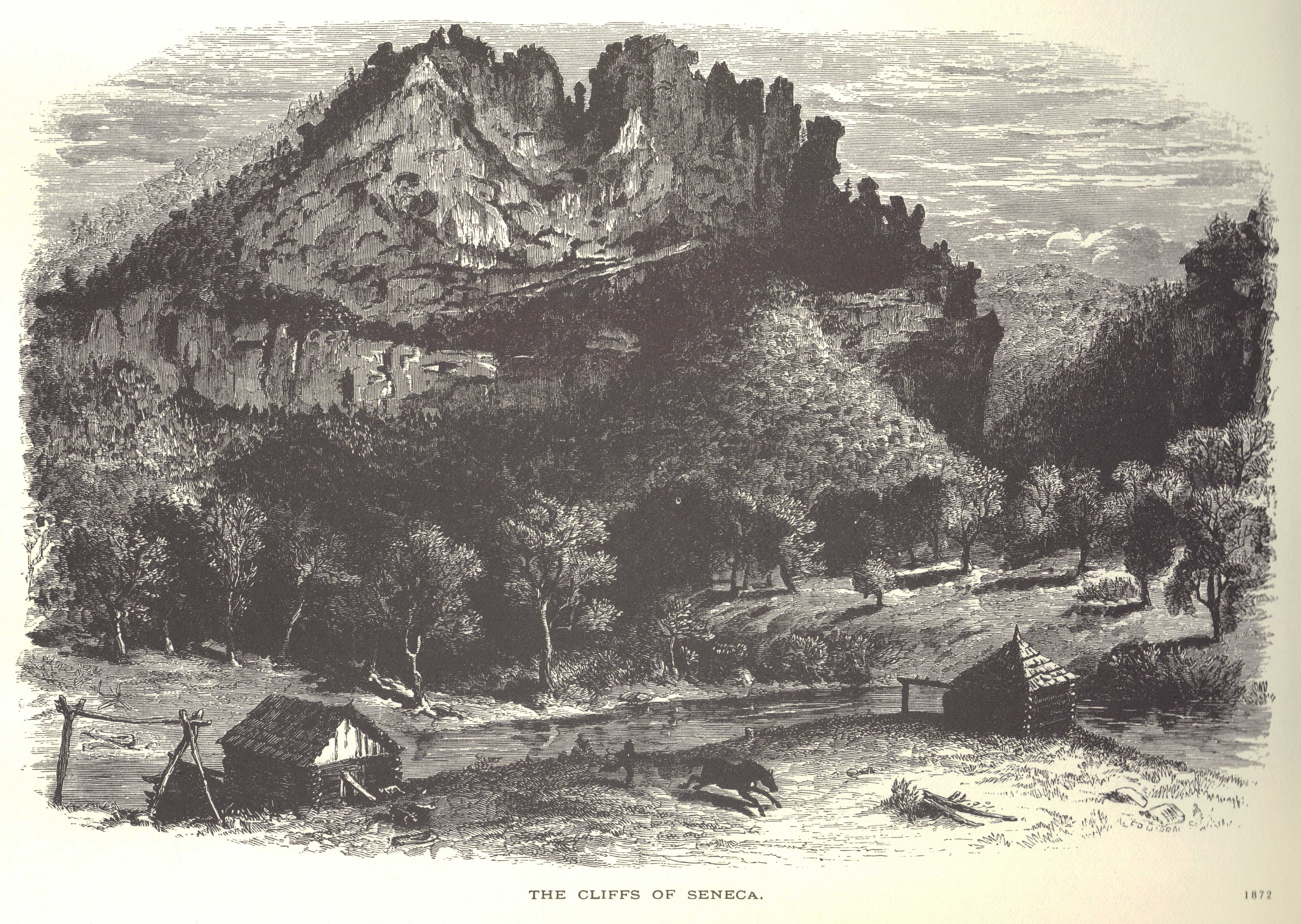
"The Cliffs of Seneca" (Wood engraving by David H.Strother, from "The Mountains III", Harper's New Monthly Magazine XLV (June 1872), 30.)

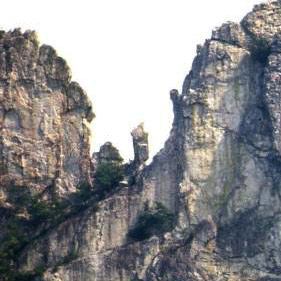
"The Gendarme" in a 1975 photo

Evidence suggests that the Native Americans of the Archaic Period may have camped frequently at the mouth of nearby Seneca Creek at the foot of the Rocks. The famous Great Indian Warpath, known locally as the "Seneca Trail", followed the Potomac River, allowing the Algonquian, Tuscarora, and Seneca nations to transit the area for purposes of trade and war. Excavation for the building of the present Seneca Rocks Visitor Center uncovered evidence of two villages, the more recent of which thrived about 700 years ago. About a dozen dwellings were found.

The first European visitors to see the region were surveyors who passed through around 1746, and the first settlers arrived at Mouth of Seneca fifteen years later. At that time, West Virginia (or western Virginia as it was then) was at the edge of the great wilderness. The Rocks were visited and sketched by the well-known writer and magazine illustrator David Hunter Strother (known by his pseudonym "Porte Crayon") around 1853. His sketches were reworked and published two decades later as a popular wood engraving in an 1872 issue of Harper's New Monthly Magazine. (see image left).

It is unknown who the first person was to climb Seneca Rocks. Undoubtedly Native Americans scaled the rocks before European settlers reaching the area, but there is no record of their ascents. The historic ascent of Paul Bradt, Don Hubbard, and Sam Moore in 1939 found an inscription of "D.B. September 16, 1908." This has been attributed to a surveyor named Bittenger who was known to be working in the area.

The documented climbing history of the Rocks begins in 1935 with a roped descent - the ascent was a steep hike – of the North Peak by Paul Bradt and Florence Perry. In the 1930s and 1940s only a few climbers, mostly from the Washington, D.C., and Pittsburgh areas, attempted to climb Seneca Rocks.

In 1943 and 1944, as part of the West Virginia Maneuver Area, the 10th Mountain Division of the U.S. Army used Seneca, Nelson and Champe Rocks to train mountain troops in assault climbing in preparation for action in the Apennines of Italy. They left behind an estimated 75,000 soft iron pitons, some of which can still be found on the rocks, and which inspired one of the faces to be named "The Face of a Thousand Pitons". Many of those pitons were retrieved and reused by local climbers in the following years, but many remained in the rock for decades.

The Spruce Knob–Seneca Rocks National Recreation Area (NRA) was established within the Monongahela National Forest by an act of the U.S. Congress on September 28, 1965. The Rocks themselves were purchased by the federal government in 1969 from the heirs of D. C. Harper.

The original visitor center was opened in 1978 and constructed on a grant of $297,000. A 1985 flood severely damaged the facility. On October 22, 1987, "the Gendarme", an isolated and prominent pinnacle of the Rocks, fell to the ground. On May 26, 1992, the visitor center was destroyed by arson. The current visitor center — known as the Seneca Rocks Discovery Center — was completed in the fall of 1998 on a 5 million dollar grant.

The "Seneca Rock" turnpoint at 38°50′03″N 79°22′04″W has been used by glider pilots for gliding competitions and soaring awards because its distinctive appearance in aerial photographs made it suitable for photo documentation of the flight performance. This turnpoint was used on many 500-kilometer out-and-return course flights from Ridge Soaring Gliderport in Julian, Pennsylvania, including an October 15, 1995, flight by Canadian pilot Walter Weir that was recognized as a world record at the time.

== Rock climbing ==
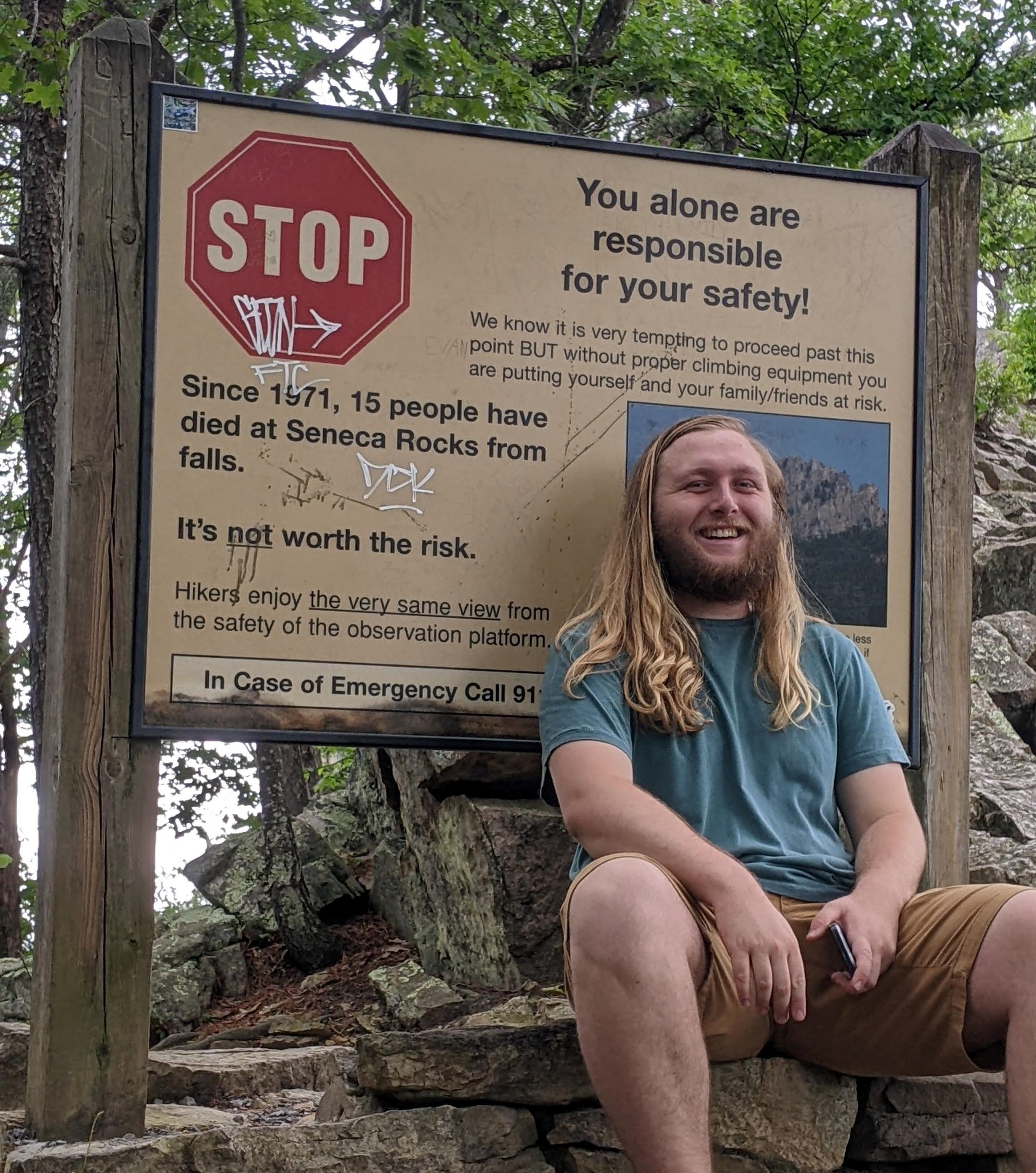
According to the warning sign near the top of North Peak, 15 people have died in falls while climbing Seneca Rocks since 1971.

Seneca Rocks is a popular location for recreational rock climbing. There are 375 major mapped climbing routes, varying in degree from 5.0 (the easiest) to 5.14b (the hardest). There are two climbing schools located in Seneca Rocks that train prospective climbers in beginning and advanced rock climbing: Seneca Rocks Climbing School and Seneca Rocks Mountain Guides. Other climbing guide services, particularly those located in the surrounding states, also guide and instruct rock climbing at Seneca Rocks.

Both the East and West faces of the North and South Peak offer single and multi-pitch routes up to 300 ft in length. Technical routes also exist on the Lower Slabs, located on the slopes below the west face of the North Peak, and on the Southern Pillar, directly across Roy Gap from the South Peak. Because of the way the rock was uplifted, many vertical cracks offer excellent jamming and good protection. Routes range from 5.0 to 5.14, nearly all of which require the leader to place protection (traditional climbing). The South Peak is the tallest peak east of Devils Tower in Wyoming and is only accessible by 5th-class climbing.

== Popular legends ==
A popular romance of the Rocks — "The Betrothal of Snow Bird, Princess of the Seneca Indians" — was written in 1932 by Harry Malcolm Wade. West Virginia writer J. Lawrence Smith provides the following summary of the story:

Princess Snow Bird, who had grown to maidenhood in the shadow of the rocks and scaled their heights many times, proposed a contest to her father, [Chief] Bald Eagle. She would climb to the crest of the rocks as prospective suitors followed. The first to take her hand would become her mate. Bald Eagle agreed, and at the end of the climb, of seven suitors, only one remained, the others having turned back from fear or fallen to their deaths. From their lofty perch, Snow Bird and her future mate surveyed the surrounding realm of the Seneca that would be theirs to rule one day.

In reality, the Seneca homeland was in what is now western New York state, and what Seneca tribesmen passed this way were strictly transients. (The historical "Chief Bald Eagle" [d. 1779], also known as Chief Woapalanne, was a Lenape leader of central Pennsylvania, not a Seneca of [West] Virginia.)

== Gallery ==
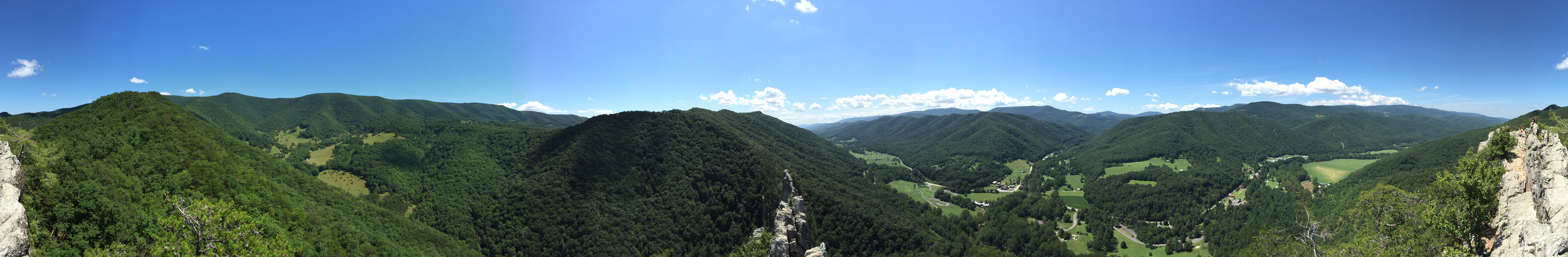
360-degree panorama from the top of the north peak of Seneca Rocks
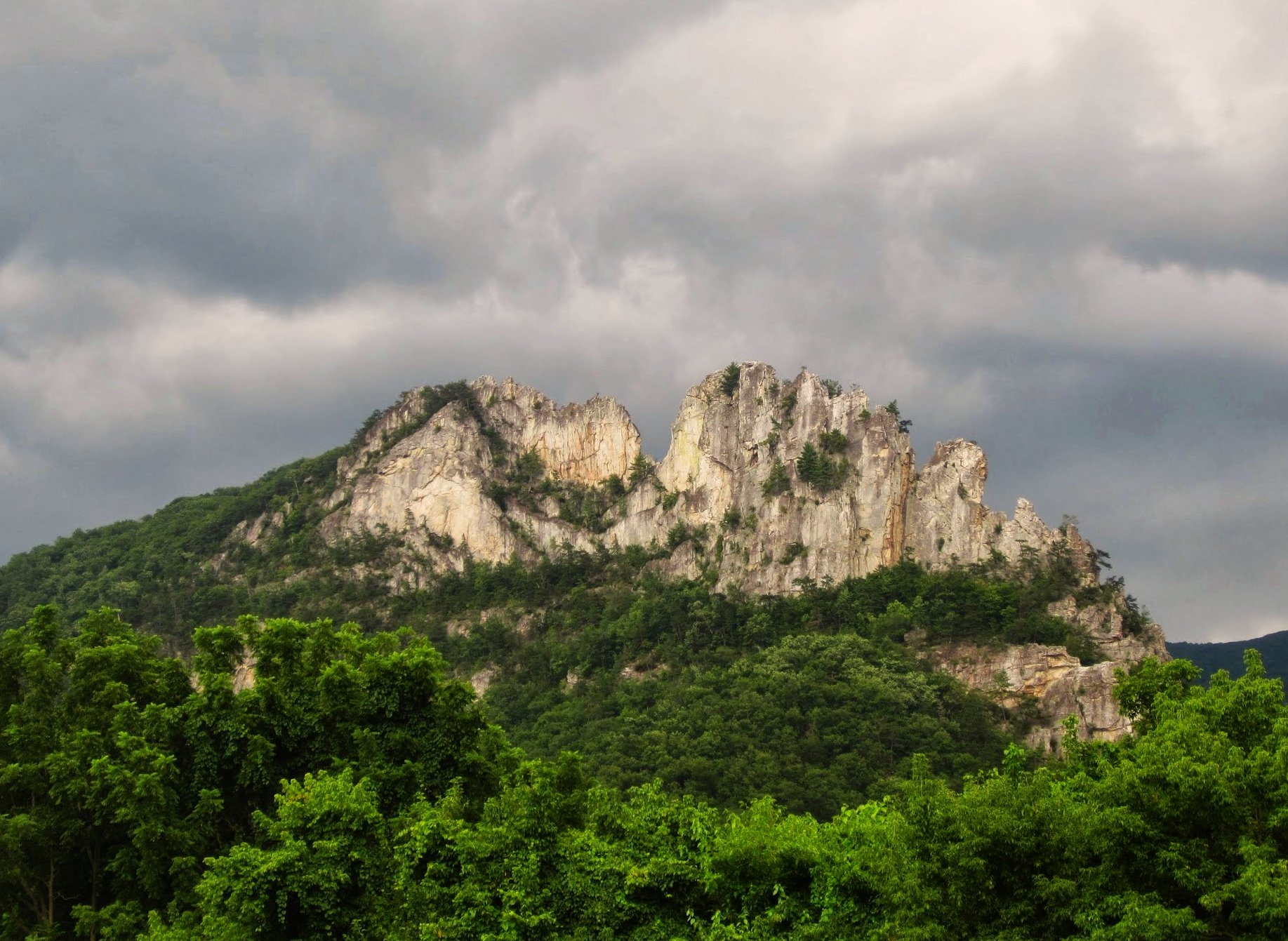
Seneca Rocks viewed from the parking lot

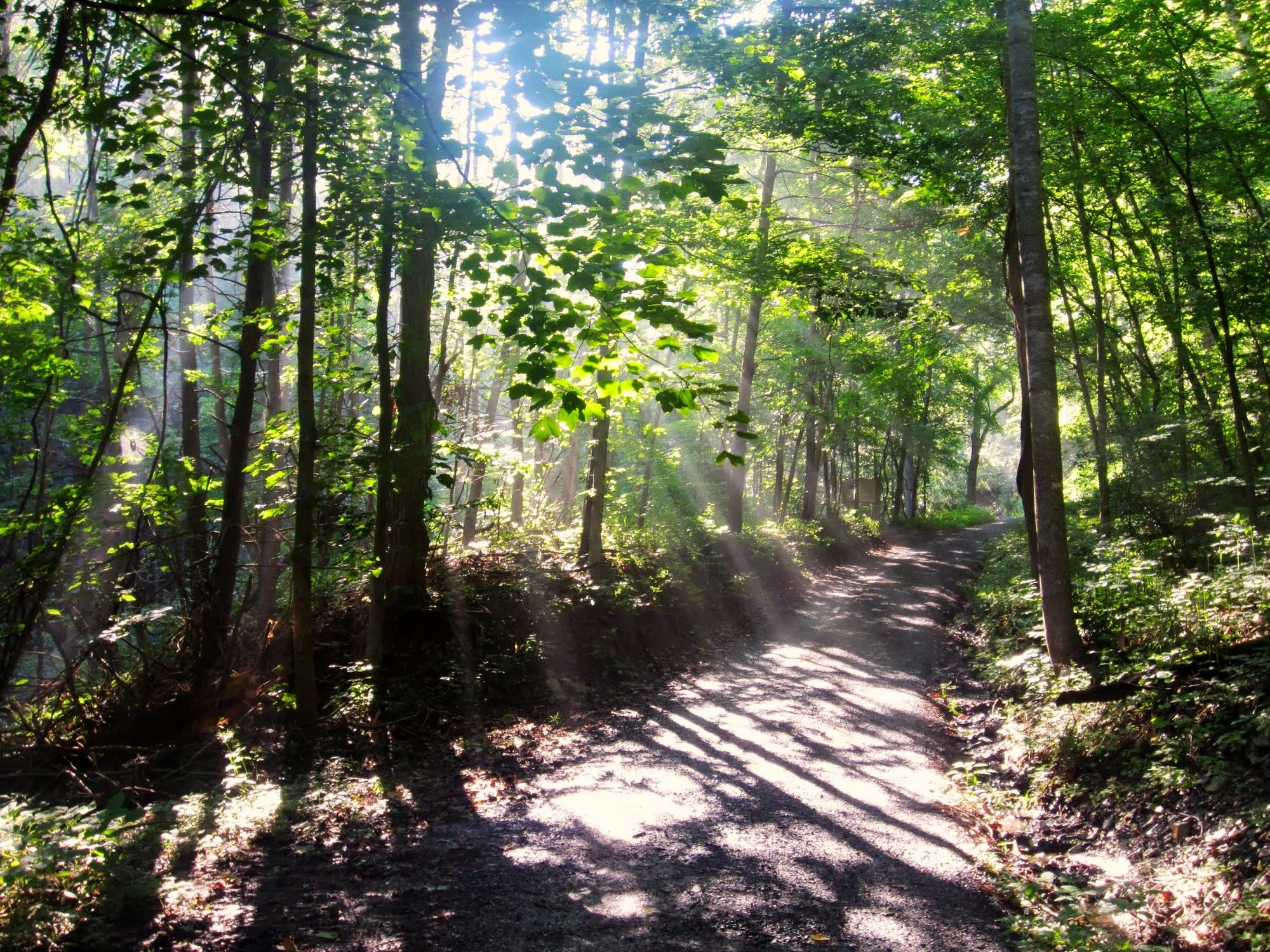
View of the trail / road (Roy Gap Road) to the South Peak area in the morning

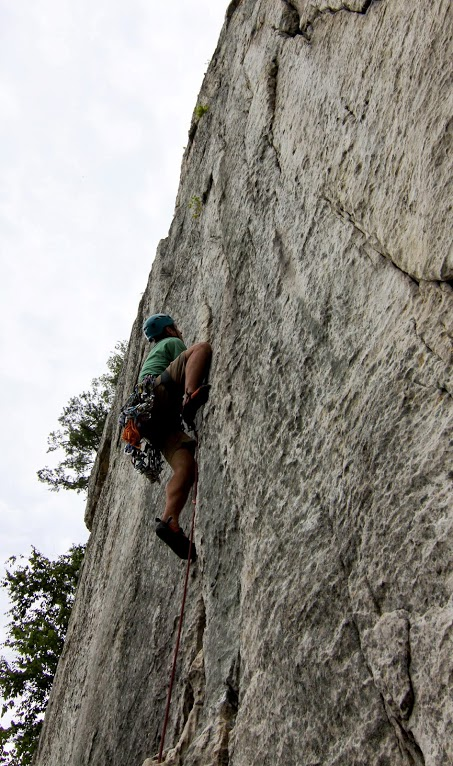
Climber on "Castor," east face of Seneca Rocks

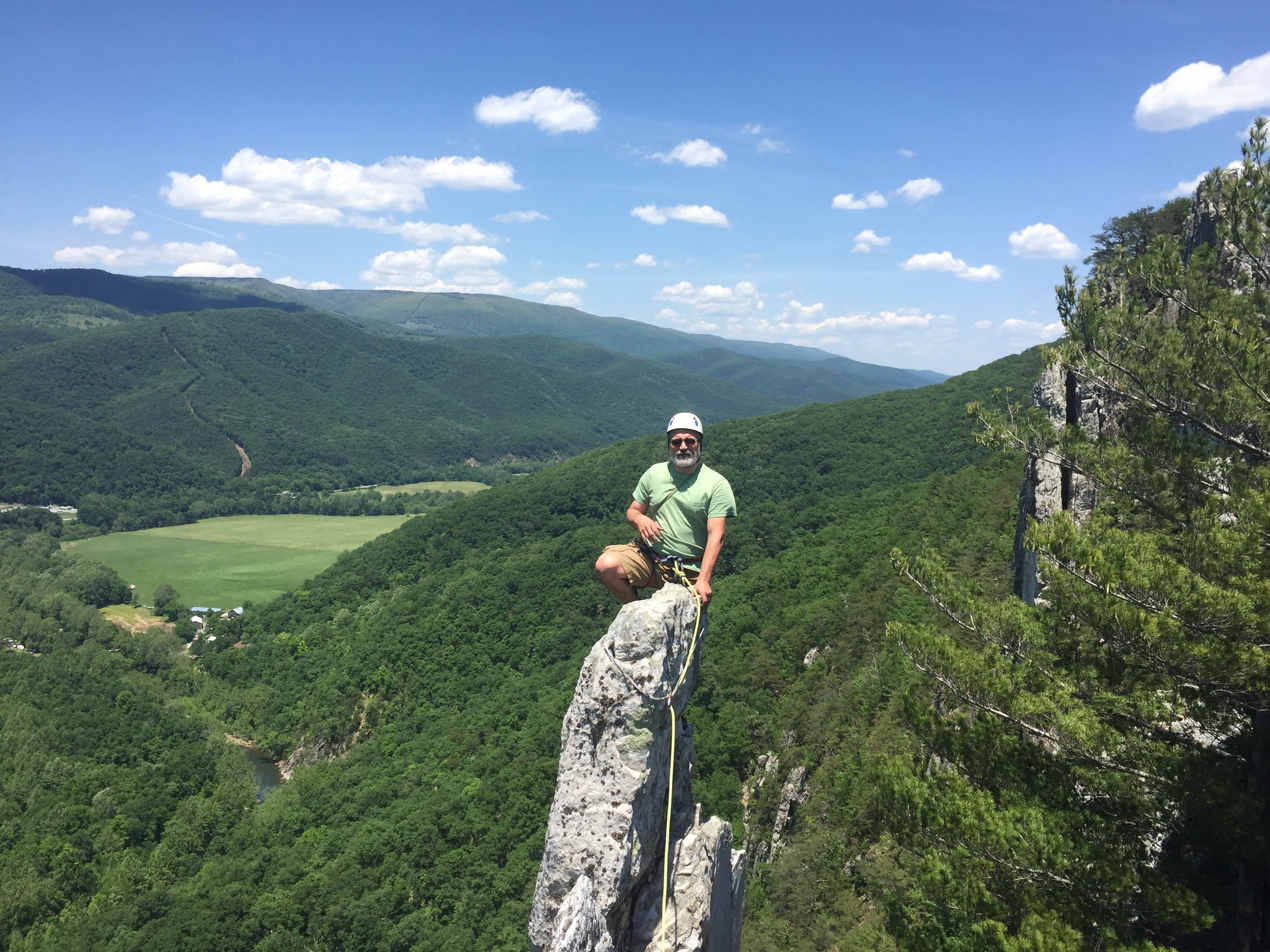
Climber on top of "Bring on the nubiles", west face of Seneca Rocks

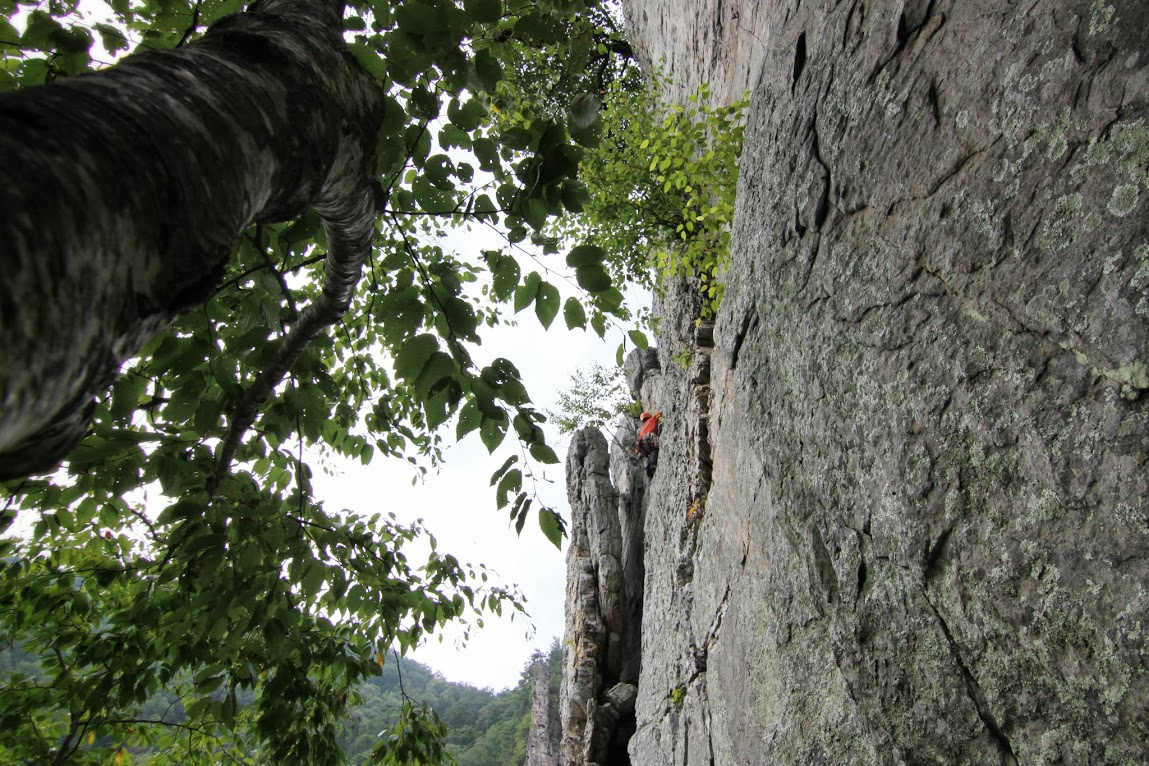
East face of Seneca Rocks

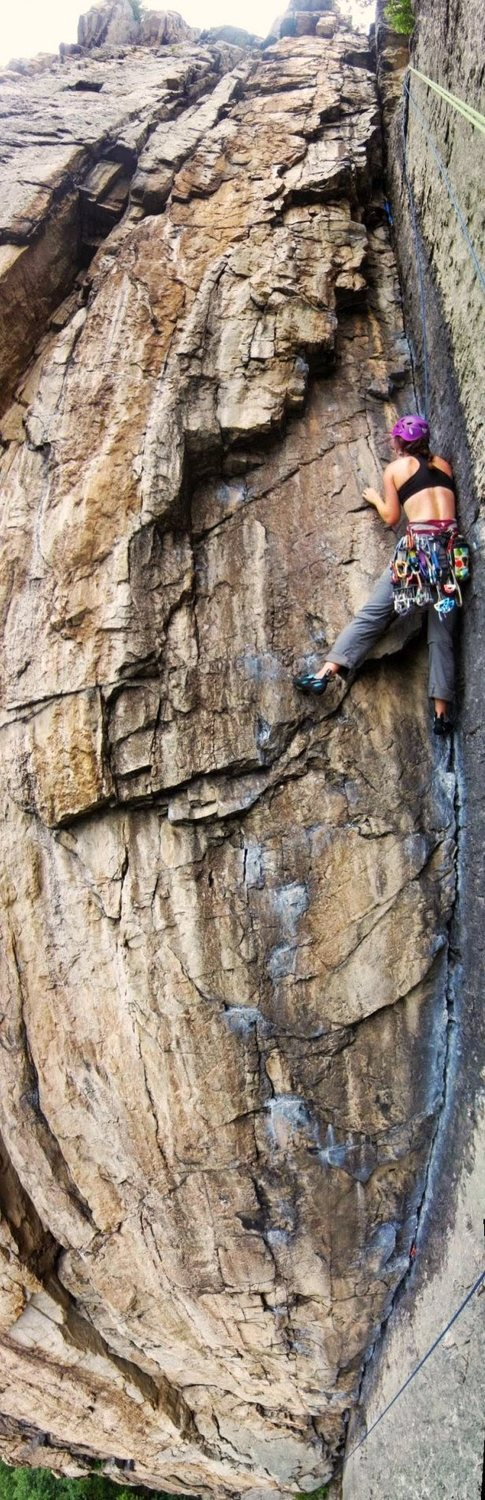
Vertical panorama of "Triple S" on the west face of Seneca Rocks

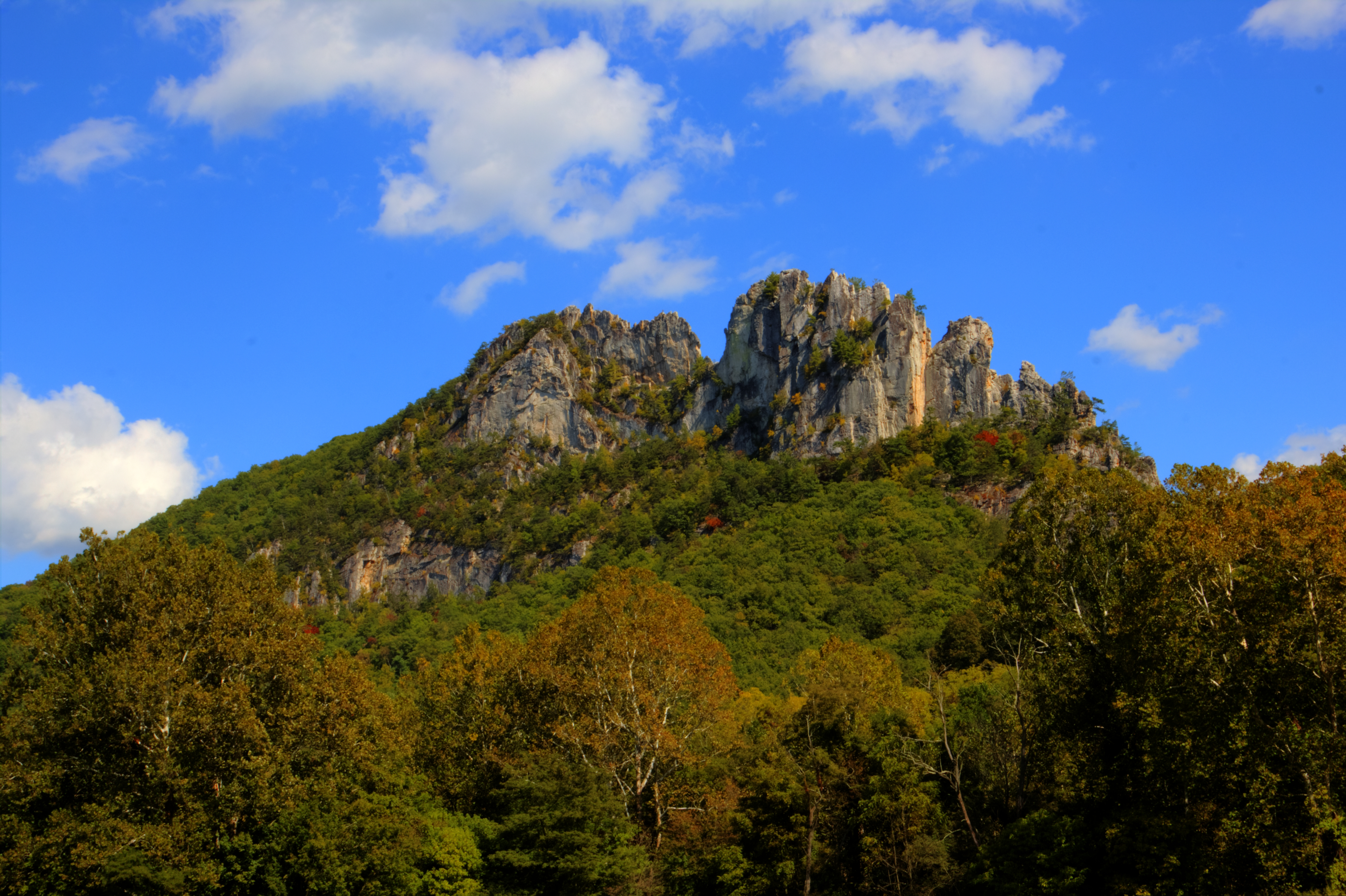
Seneca Rocks in the Fall

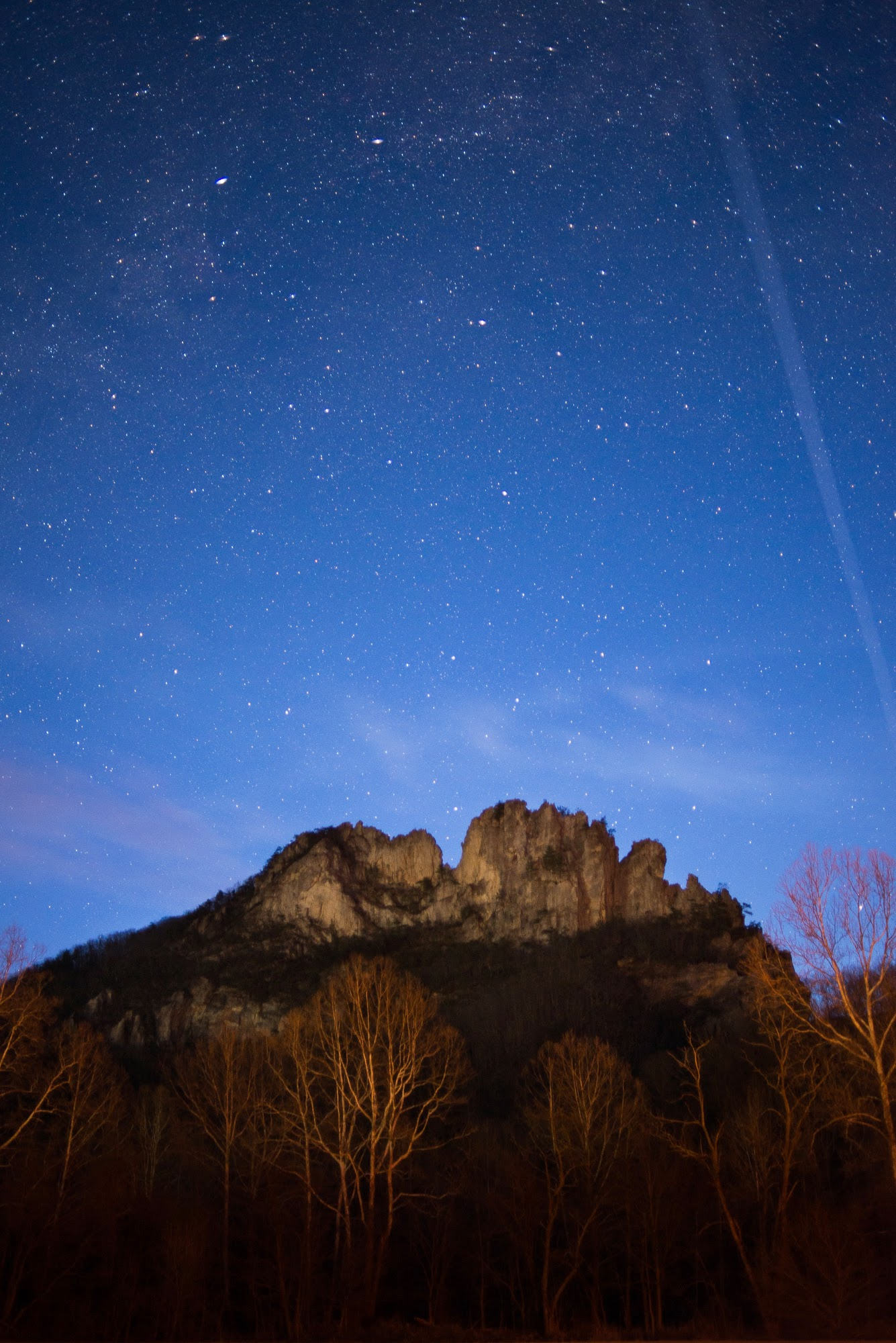
Seneca Rocks night sky, as seen from the town of Seneca Rocks, West Virginia in the Monongahela National Forest.

== See also ==
- Germany Valley
- Shawnee Trail (West Virginia)

== Nearby State Parks ==
- Audra State Park
- Blackwater Falls State Park
- Canaan Valley Resort State Park
- Cass Scenic Railroad State Park
- Lost River State Park
