= Spruce Knob–Seneca Rocks National Recreation Area =

Protected area in West Virginia, US

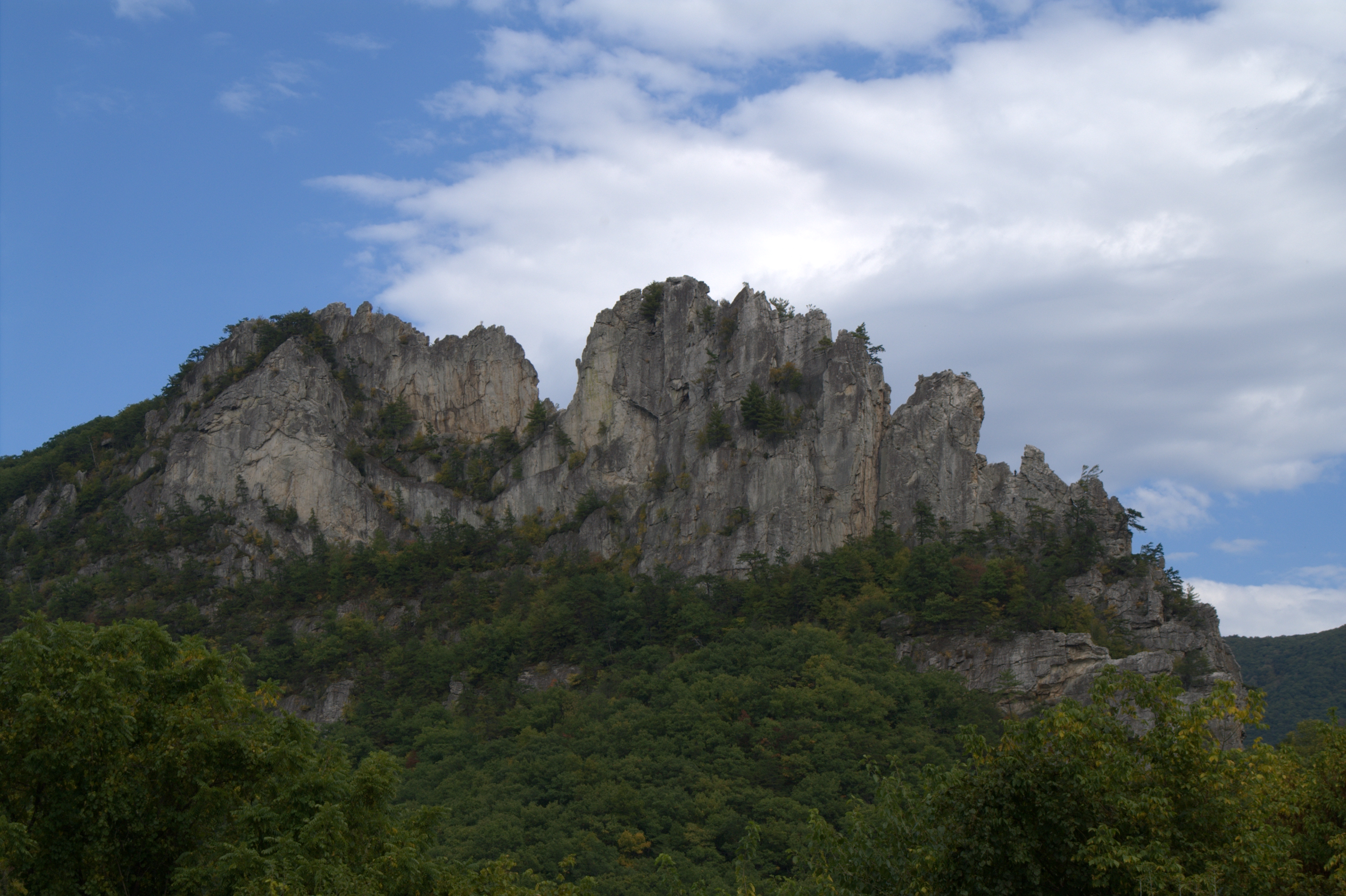
- Seneca Rocks in West Virginia

- Location within West Virginia
- Interactive map of Spruce Knob–Seneca Rocks National Recreation Area
- Location: West Virginia, U.S.
- Coordinates: 38°50′02″N 79°22′04″W
- Area: 100,000 acres (400 km^{2})
- Elevation: 1,923 ft (586 m)
- Established: 1965-09-28
- Operator: Monongahela National Forest
- Website: Spruce Knob-Seneca Rocks National Recreation Area

Spruce Knob–Seneca Rocks National Recreation Area is a national recreation area in the Monongahela National Forest of eastern West Virginia.

The national recreation area protects three prominent West Virginia landmarks:

- Spruce Knob, the highest point in West Virginia (and the highest of the Allegheny Mountains) with a summit elevation of 4,863 feet (1,482 m).
- Seneca Rocks, a 900-foot-high (270 m) quartzite crag popular with rock climbers.
- Smoke Hole Canyon, a canyon along the South Branch Potomac River.

Spruce Knob–Seneca Rocks National Recreation Area was established by an act of the U.S. Congress on September 28, 1965, as the first national recreation area in a United States National Forest, so it is administered by the U.S. Forest Service.

== Popular culture ==
- Spruce Knob–Seneca Rocks National Recreation Area is a location in role-playing game Fallout 76.

== See also ==
- Ketterman, West Virginia
