= Potomac Highlands =

Geographic region in West Virginia, United States

Coordinates: 38°52′N 79°22′W

The Potomac Highlands of West Virginia (/pəˈtoʊmək/), or simply the Potomac Highlands, centers on five West Virginian counties (Grant, Hampshire, Hardy, Mineral, and Pendleton) in the upper Potomac River watershed in the western portion of the state's eastern panhandle, bordering Maryland and Virginia. Because of geographical proximity, similar topography and landscapes, and shared culture and history, the Potomac Highlands region is also considered to include Pocahontas, Randolph, and Tucker Counties, even though they are in the Monongahela River or New River watersheds and not the Potomac River watershed.

The Potomac Highlands broadly overlap but are not identical with the four-state Allegheny Highlands or High Alleghenies region, which includes the relatively high and rugged mountains along and near the Allegheny Front from extreme southern Pennsylvania southward across Maryland and West Virginia into adjacent Virginia.

== Geography ==
The region's geologic setting and landscape history make the Potomac Highlands one of the most scenic areas within the central Appalachian Mountains. The eastern part of the region is within the Ridge and Valley physiographic province, where long, steep-sided mountain ridges alternate with parallel broad, flat valleys. Water gaps, where rivers or streams have cut through the ridges, are important not only for their dramatic scenery, but also for their utility as easy crossings of these otherwise formidable mountains for roads, railroads, and telephone and telegraph lines. The western portion of the Potomac Highlands is within the Allegheny Plateau, with the Allegheny Front's prominent escarpment providing the boundary between these two areas.

While much of the land in the Potomac Highlands is privately owned, large portions of the area are within the Monongahela National Forest, the George Washington National Forest, or various other kinds of parks, preserves, or other managed wild areas. A group of sites within the Allegheny Highlands has been proposed for inclusion as a new unit within the U.S. National Park System.

The Fairfax Stone, marking the source of the Potomac River, is along the north edge of the Potomac Highlands, just south of the southern tip of western Maryland.

=== Ridge and Valley region ===
Among notable scenic features or wild areas within the Ridge and Valley portion of the Potomac Highlands are:

- Germany Valley
- The Germany Valley Overlook, on U.S. 33 on the western slope of North Fork Mountain
- Greenland Gap, a preserve owned by The Nature Conservancy
- Ice Mountain, a preserve owned by The Nature Conservancy
- Lost River State Park
- Nathaniel Mountain Wildlife Management Area
- North Fork Mountain, along the axis of the Wills Mountain Anticline, a long, high ridge crossed only by U.S. 33; Kile Knob, Panther Knob, and Pike Knob are among the mountain's high points
- North Fork Mountain Red Pine Botanical Area
- The North Fork Water Gap, west of Petersburg
- Reddish Knob, on Shenandoah Mountain on the state line with Virginia
- Seneca Caverns, in the Germany Valley
- Seneca Rocks and such similar near-vertical Tuscarora quartzite outcrops as Champe Rocks, Nelson Rocks, and Judy Rocks, all structurally parts of the western limb of the Wills Mountain Anticline.
- Short Mountain Wildlife Management Area
- The Smoke Hole (or Smoke Hole Canyon)
- Smoke Hole Caverns
- Trout Pond Wildlife Management Area

The George Washington National Forest includes six Recreation Areas within the Potomac Highlands' Ridge and Valley region: Brandywine RA, Camp Run RA, Rock Cliff RA, Shenandoah Mountain RA, Trout Pond RA, and Wolf Gap RA.

=== Allegheny Front ===
The Allegheny Front provides the setting for various high, openly vegetated areas atop massive outcrops of the Pottsville sandstone, including:

- Spruce Knob, West Virginia's highest point
- Dolly Sods, including the Dolly Sods Recreation Area and the Dolly Sods Wilderness

=== Appalachian Plateau ===
Within the region's three western counties, landscapes of the Appalachian Plateau include such features as:

- Beartown State Park
- Big Ditch Wildlife Management Area
- The Blackwater Canyon
- Blackwater Falls, in Blackwater Falls State Park
- The Canaan Valley, including the Canaan Valley National Wildlife Refuge and Canaan Valley Resort State Park
- Cass Scenic Railroad State Park
- Cranberry Glades Botanical Area
- The Cranberry Wilderness and the Cranberry Backcountry
- Droop Mountain Battlefield State Park
- Gaudineer Knob (within the Gaudineer Knob Recreation Area)
- Greenbrier River Trail State Park
- Handley Wildlife Management Area
- The High Falls of the Cheat River
- Hills Creek Falls
- Kumbrabow State Forest
- The Otter Creek Wilderness
- Seneca State Forest
- The Sinks of Gandy
- The Valley Bend Wetland
- Watoga State Park

The Monongahela National Forest includes a number of Recreation Areas on the Appalachian Plateau, including: Bear Heaven RA, Bickle Knob RA, Big Bend RA, Bird Run RA, Bishop Knob RA, Cranberry RA, Gaudineer Knob RA, Horseshoe RA, Lake Buffalo RA, Laurel Fork RA, Old House Run RA, Pocahontas RA, Red Creek RA, Red Lick RA, Spruce Knob Lake RA, Stuart RA, and Tea Creek RA.

== County information ==
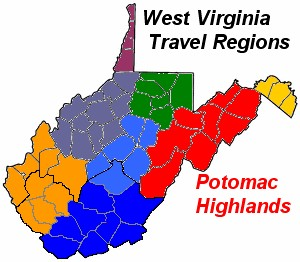
General Information, The Wonders of WV, 2007 ^{(1)} Note, modern tourism regions do not necessarily match traditional geography regions.

The following eight West Virginia counties are included within the Potomac Highlands:

County	Named For	Founded	Seat
Grant	Ulysses S. Grant	February 14, 1866	Petersburg
Hampshire	Hampshire County, England	December 13, 1753	Romney
Hardy	Samuel Hardy	December 10, 1785	Moorefield
Mineral	Minerals located in the county	February 1, 1866	Keyser
Pendleton	Edmund Pendleton	December 4, 1787	Franklin
Pocahontas	Pocahontas of the Powhatan Native American people	1821	Marlinton
Randolph	Edmund Jennings Randolph	1787	Elkins
Tucker	Henry St. George Tucker, Sr.	1856	Parsons

== Largest cities ==
City	2005 (estimate)	2000	County
Elkins	7,109	7,032	Randolph
Keyser	5,410	5,303	Mineral
Petersburg	2,634	2,423	Grant
Moorefield	2,408	2,375	Hardy
Romney	1,975	1,940	Hampshire
Parsons	1,400	1,463	Tucker
Marlinton	1,247	1,204	Pocahontas
