= North Fork Mountain =

Mountain in West Virginia, United States

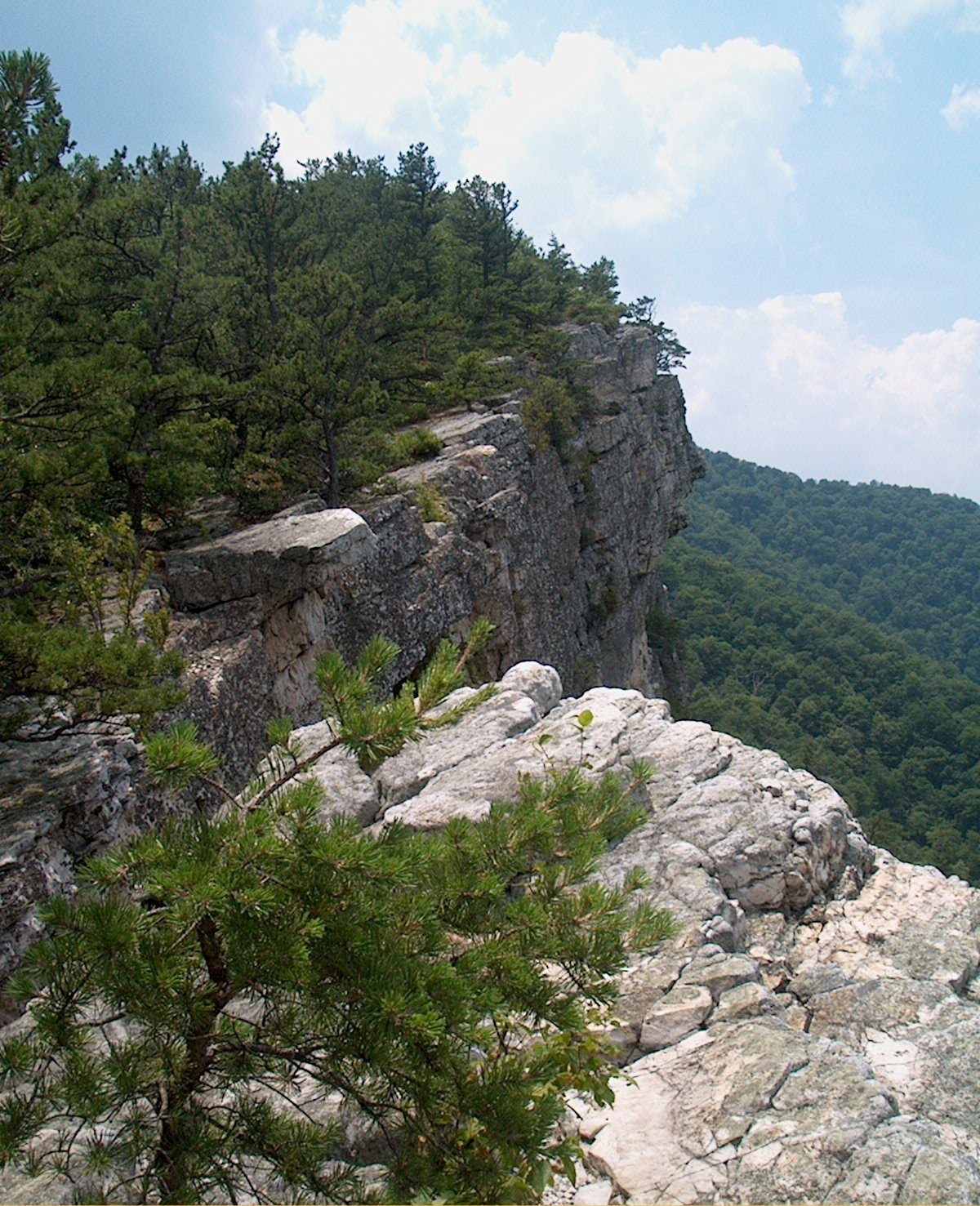
- North Fork Mountain facing the Tuscarora quartzite cliff to its west

Highest point
- Peak: Kile Knob, Pendleton County, West Virginia, U.S.
- Elevation: 4,588 ft (1,398 m)
- Coordinates: 38°36′58″N 79°28′55″W

Dimensions
- Length: 34 mi (55 km)

Geography
- Location within West Virginia
- Country: United States
- State: West Virginia
- Counties: Grant and Pendleton
- Range coordinates: 38°40′03″N 79°26′16″W
- Parent range: Allegheny Mountains
- Topo maps: USGS: Upper Tract; Moatstown; Circleville; Franklin; Hopeville

North Fork Mountain is a quartzite-capped mountain ridge in the Ridge and Valley physiographic province of the Allegheny Mountains, also known as the High Alleghenies or Potomac Highlands, of eastern West Virginia. Kile Knob, at 4,588 feet (1,398 m), is the mountain's highest point, and Panther Knob and Pike Knob are nearly as high.

North Fork Mountain is the driest high mountain in the Appalachians, and has vegetation and flora different from nearby, wetter high mountain areas immediately to the west such as Spruce Knob and Dolly Sods, with pines (Pinus) abundant on the mountain's ridgecrest, in contrast with the spruces (Picea) so characteristic of these comparably high summits across the North Fork Valley.

North Fork Mountain is structurally an anticline mountain and a major component of the Wills Mountain Anticline system. The mountain's strata (rock layers) are nearly flat, but the Tuscarora quartzite that forms the mountain's caprock is bent downwards (and now mostly eroded away) east and west of the ridge, becoming nearly vertical along the mountain's slopes, where the same quartzite stratum forms such dramatic outcrops as Seneca Rocks.

Much of the mountain is within the Monongahela National Forest, and a large portion of the mountain has been proposed for federal wilderness designation or inclusion within a new unit of U.S. National Park System. The Nature Conservancy's Panther Knob and Pike Knob preserves are also located on North Fork Mountain.

The scenic North Fork Mountain Trail follows much of the ridge crest, and U.S. Route 33 is the only road that crosses the steep, rugged ridge.

== Geography ==
North Fork Mountain runs roughly northeast to southwest for 34 miles (55 km) throughout Grant and Pendleton Counties in West Virginia. It separates the South Branch of the Potomac River watershed from that of the North Fork of the South Branch of the Potomac River. It also forms the western edge of Smoke Hole Canyon, a portion of the South Branch popular with boaters.

The north end of the mountain arises abruptly along the south side of North Fork Gap, a water gap along the North Fork river and West Virginia Route 28 near Cabins, west of Petersburg. The mountain continues southwest from there to Dry Run Gap in southern Pendleton County.

North Fork Mountain reaches its highest elevation (4,588 feet, or 1,398 m) at Kile Knob. Other notable points along the mountain include Panther Knob at 4,498 feet (1,371 m) and Pike Knob, both having nature preserves owned and managed by The Nature Conservancy.

Today there are no settlements on the mountain itself – except, arguably, Monkeytown on the western slopes. There are however numerous scattered homes and vacation rental cabins on the mountain. Future Generations Graduate School's main campus is located at the top of the ridgeline near U.S. Route 33, the only major road that crosses the mountain.

=== Climate ===
Kile Knob (West Virginia), the highest point of North Fork Mountain, has a humid continental climate (Köppen Dfb). There is no weather station, but this climate table contains interpolated data.

Climate data for Kile Knob 38.6080 N, 79.4863 W, Elevation: 4,314 ft (1,315 m) (1991–2020 normals)
| Month | Jan | Feb | Mar | Apr | May | Jun | Jul | Aug | Sep | Oct | Nov | Dec | Year |
|---|---|---|---|---|---|---|---|---|---|---|---|---|---|
| Mean daily maximum °F (°C) | 32.3 (0.2) | 34.6 (1.4) | 41.8 (5.4) | 55.0 (12.8) | 63.3 (17.4) | 70.1 (21.2) | 73.4 (23.0) | 72.4 (22.4) | 67.7 (19.8) | 58.5 (14.7) | 45.3 (7.4) | 36.6 (2.6) | 54.2 (12.4) |
| Daily mean °F (°C) | 23.9 (−4.5) | 25.9 (−3.4) | 32.8 (0.4) | 44.5 (6.9) | 53.6 (12.0) | 61.0 (16.1) | 64.7 (18.2) | 63.6 (17.6) | 58.5 (14.7) | 48.3 (9.1) | 36.5 (2.5) | 28.5 (−1.9) | 45.2 (7.3) |
| Mean daily minimum °F (°C) | 15.6 (−9.1) | 17.2 (−8.2) | 23.7 (−4.6) | 34.0 (1.1) | 43.9 (6.6) | 52.0 (11.1) | 55.9 (13.3) | 54.8 (12.7) | 49.4 (9.7) | 38.0 (3.3) | 27.8 (−2.3) | 20.4 (−6.4) | 36.1 (2.3) |
| Average precipitation inches (mm) | 3.61 (92) | 3.06 (78) | 4.05 (103) | 3.97 (101) | 4.56 (116) | 4.70 (119) | 4.98 (126) | 4.10 (104) | 4.00 (102) | 3.05 (77) | 3.05 (77) | 3.62 (92) | 46.75 (1,187) |
Source: PRISM Climate Group

== Geology ==
North Fork Mountain is part of the Wills Mountain Anticline, a geological structure that extends from Pennsylvania through Maryland and West Virginia into Virginia. The same geologic ridge that forms North Fork Mountain is known as New Creek Mountain north of North Fork Gap. At North Fork's southern end, the ridge fragments into Devils Backbone, Brushy Mountain, and Monterey Mountain, with Snowy Mountain being a minor continuation into Virginia.

Tuscarora quartzite (or sandstone), a layer of erosion-resistant Silurian rock only about 50 feet (15 m) thick, the major ridge-forming stratum in eastern West Virginia, caps most of North Fork Mountain, often as a broad, slightly eastward-tilted slab, forming numerous west-facing cliffs and various larger outcrops such as Chimney Top and Harmon Rocks. Immediately west of the mountain, the same quartzite formation is nearly vertical, along the western limb of the anticline, forming such dramatic outcrops as Seneca Rocks, Champe Rocks, Nelson Rocks, and Judy Rocks. This series of vertical outcrops is part of a formation known as the River Knobs or East Seneca Ridge.

The lower, western slopes of the mountain and the adjacent Germany Valley are underlain by the easily eroded Ordovician-aged New Market Limestone and are penetrated by numerous caves, such as the celebrated Hellhole. Shales occur on some of North Fork Mountain's slopes.

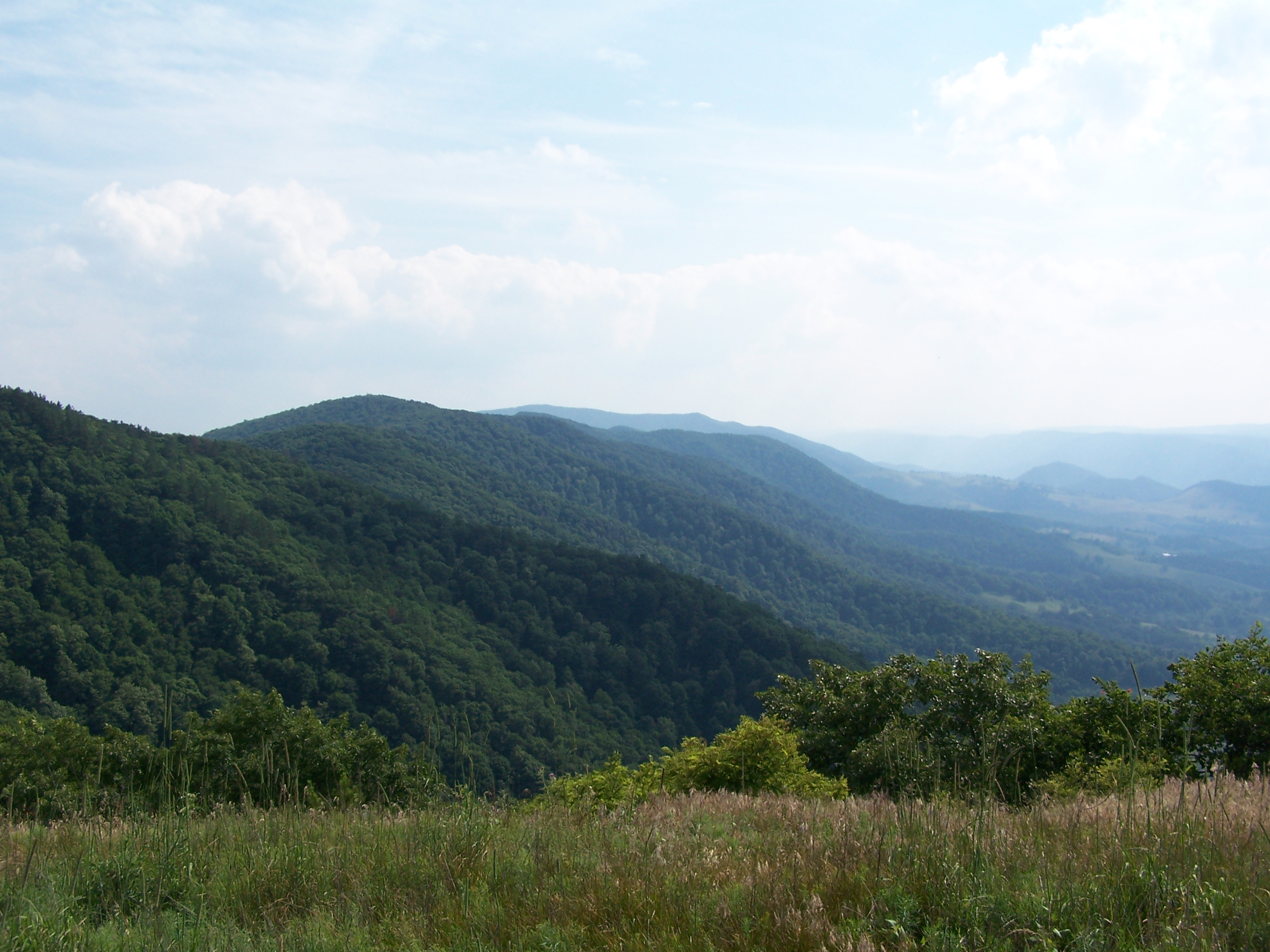
Looking south along North Fork Mountain from Nelson Sods

== History ==
Scattered family homesteads existed on the east slope of North Fork Mountain throughout the 19th and 20th centuries. These few early settlers were of English, German or Dutch stock and constituted a community known as "Smoke Hole", named for the gorge to the east of the Mountain. None of these smallholders owned slaves, a fact that determined their Unionist sentiments during the American Civil War and brought them into sometimes violent conflict with surrounding communities during that time. Rohrbaugh Cabin (or Allegheny Cabin), a log cabin built about 1880, still stands on the eastern slope, among various related structures. (It was listed on the National Register of Historic Places in 1993.) The steeper western slopes have, with few exceptions, always been uninhabited. Most of the forests on the North Fork Mountain were cut for timber in the late 19th and early 20th centuries.

Much of North Fork Mountain has been included in the Monongahela National Forest, established in 1911. Panther Knob, near the south end of North Fork Mountain, was first explored botanically by P.A. Rydberg of the New York Botanical Garden in 1926. He was astonished by the similarity of the mountaintop to the Pine Barrens of New Jersey, especially the presence of the beach heather (Hudsonia tomentosa). However, his findings were doubted until the mountaintop was revised by a group of botanists in the 1950s. Botanist Paul J. Harmon studied the flora of the entire length of North Fork Mountain's ridgetop, presenting his findings in 1981.

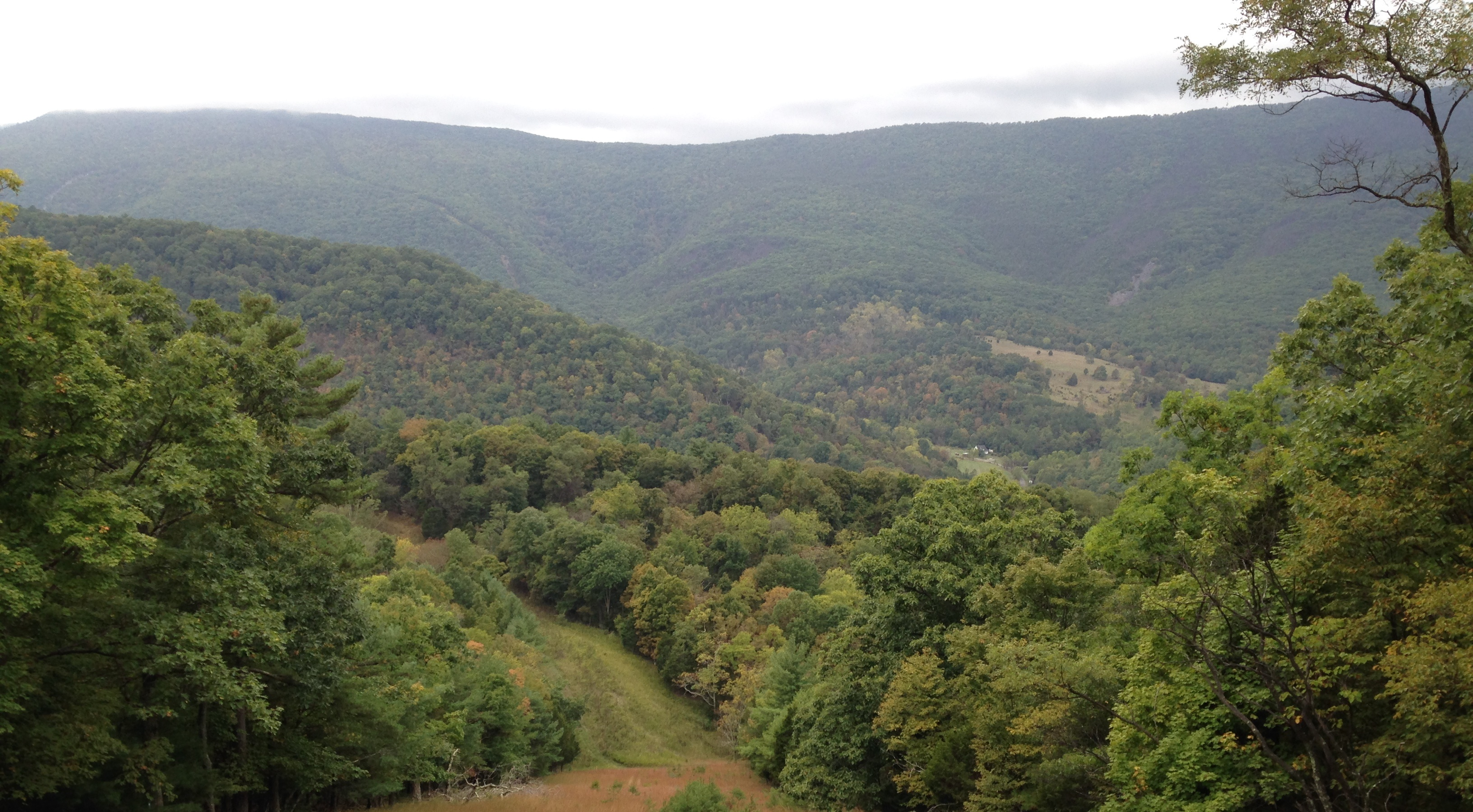
View of the eastward-looking face of the middle section of North Fork Mountain. The valley in the middle distance is Smoke Hole Canyon.

In the early 20th century, a local "character" and moonshiner – Cal Nelson – lived on the western slopes of the Mountain. "Nelson Sods" and the "Cal Nelson Trail" (former name of a portion of the North Fork Mountain Trail) are his namesakes. His colorful – sometimes outrageous – story is told in Bardon Shreve's book, A Place Called Smoke Hole.

In March 1930, after an unusually mild and dry winter, an epochal forest fire ravaged North Fork Mountain consuming most of the undergrowth and smaller trees. Fire covered almost the entire Mountain and was only extinguished by rainfall after 11 days. This dramatic event motivated the Forest Service to organize a more effective program of fire suppression on the Mountain: fire wardens were hired, a 90-foot steel fire tower was built on Pike Knob, and surveillance was undertaken 24 hours per day during the fire season. Over the next few years, local men were recruited, even compelled, to form quick-response, fire-fighting teams, but deep resentments were created. Many locals – "Smoke Holers" who lived on the gentler-sloping east side of the Mountain – blamed the Forest Service program for the deterioration in the quality of forage needed by their free-ranging swine and sheep and for the decline in the huckleberry patches. Locals surreptitiously started the next (and last) significant fire on the Mountain in the spring of 1941. Suppression efforts succeeded only after five days of hard work and about ten square miles of woodland were burned. The mostly unemployed local men fighting the fire happily accepted their wages though they all knew the true cause of the conflagration. The foundations of the Pike Knob tower, together with the ruins of the watchman's cabin nearby, can still be seen today.

Beginning in the early 1980s, The Nature Conservancy has become increasingly involved in habitat conservation on North Fork Mountain, working cooperatively with the Forest Service and with various private landowners, as well as establishing preserves on Panther Knob and on Pike Knob.

== Ecology ==
=== Flora ===
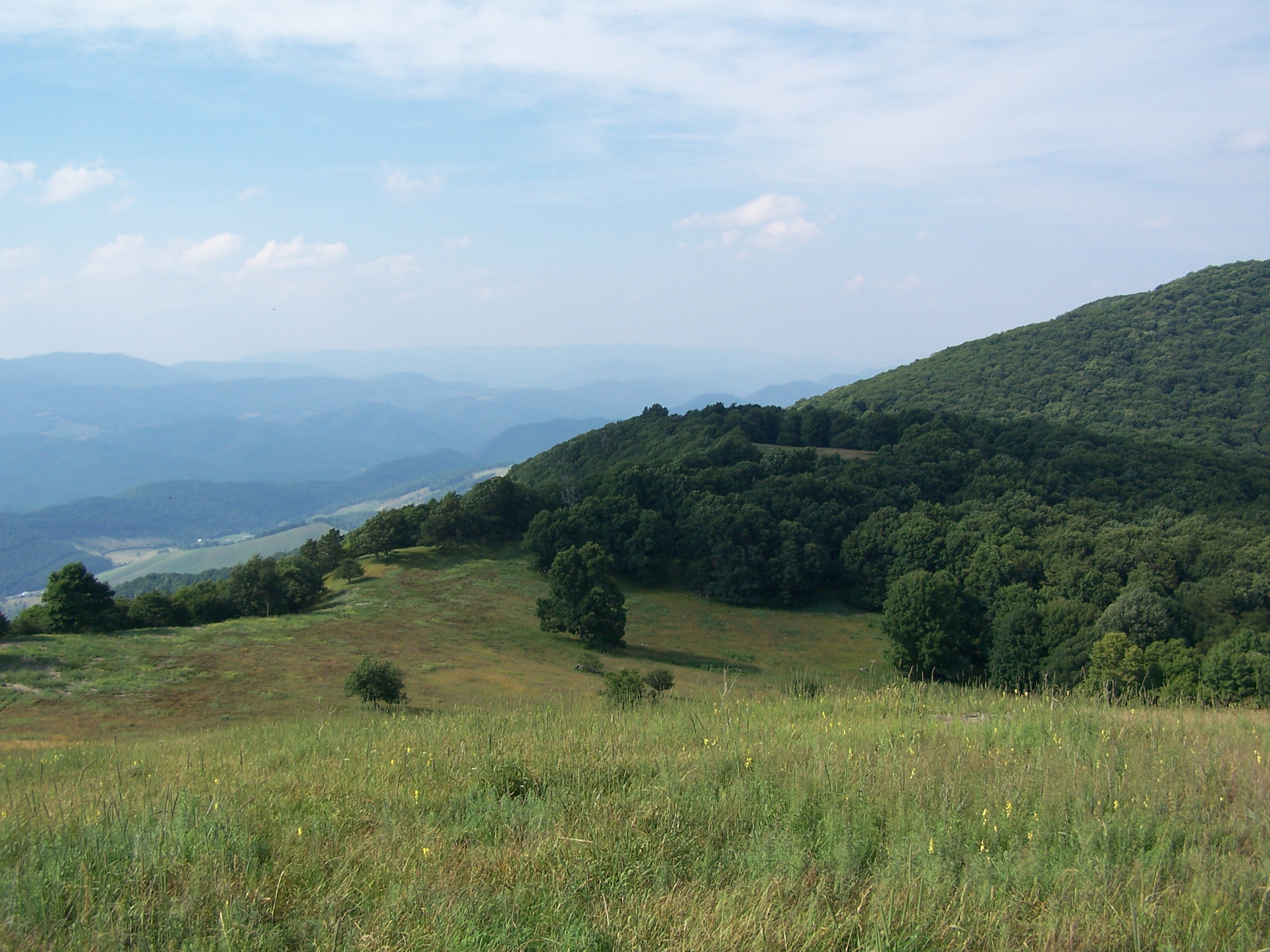
Nelson Sods

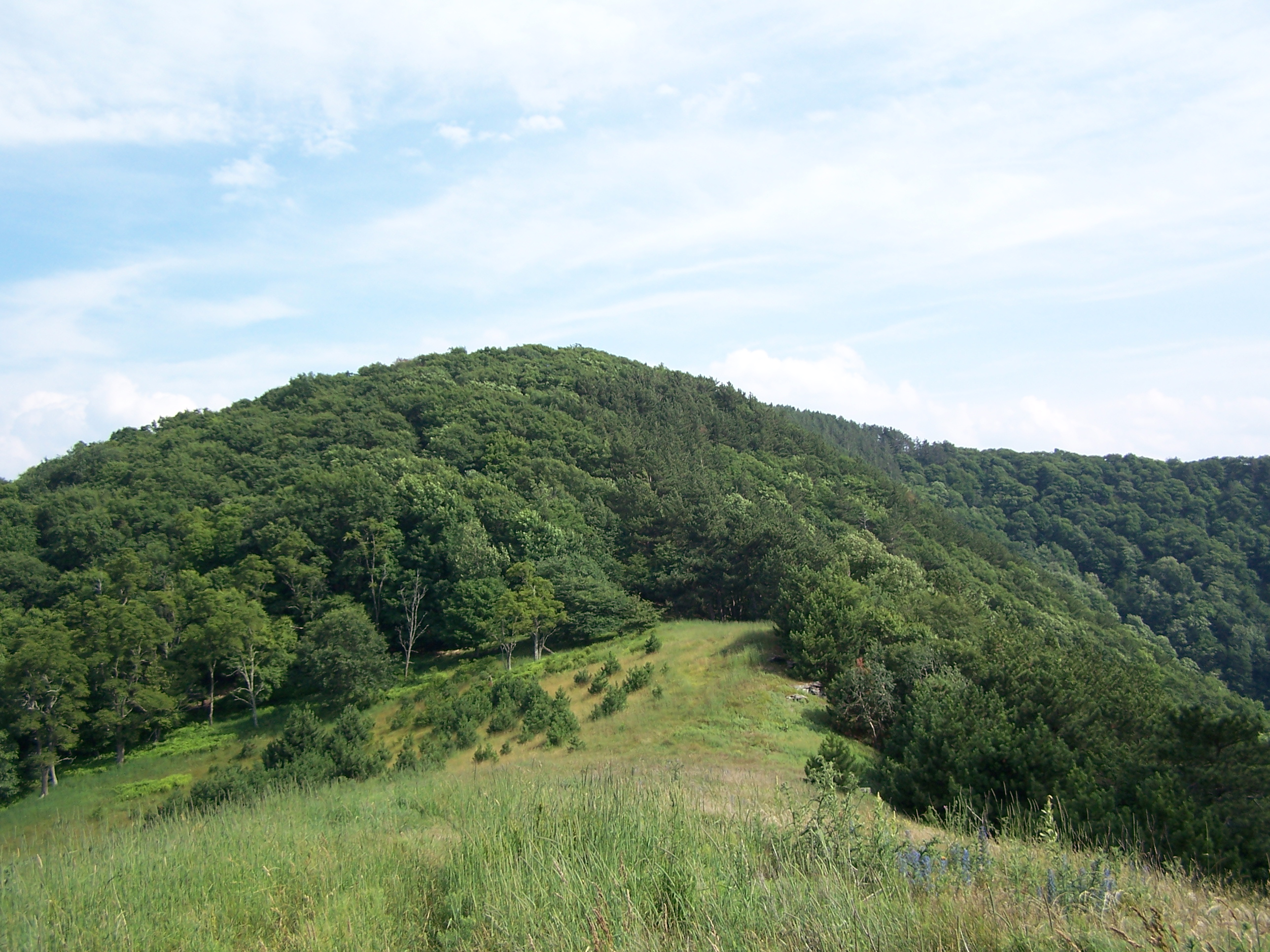
Pike Knob from the north

The forests on North Fork Mountain consists mainly of mixed oaks and other hardwoods, along with mountain laurel (Kalmia latifolia), flame azalea (Rhododendron calendulaceum), and wintergreen (Gaultheria procumbens). Pines (Pinus) are frequent along the ridgecrest, especially just back of clifftop openings. Fern beds and various wildflowers are common on the mountain's slopes. The mountain also supports a few high-elevation mountain meadows (sods), such as Nelson Sods near Pike Knob.

The exposed sandstone cliff edges so characteristic of the west side of North Fork Mountain support narrow zones of persistingly open, treeless habitat characterized by several unusual or regionally endemic plant species, including the silvery nailwort (Paronychia argyrocoma) and the white alumroot (Heuchera alba). Chestnut oak (Quercus montana) and Table Mountain pine (Pinus pungens) are often found just back of the cliff edges.

Pine barrens, maintained by frequent fires, cover several peaks; Panther Knob supports the largest pine barren in the Central Appalachians. Other rocky summits, including the 4,300-foot (1,300 m) summit of Pike Knob, are blanketed by red pine (Pinus resinosa) forests, here at their southernmost natural occurrences. The Monongahela National Forest has designated 10 acres (40,000 m^{2}) of old growth red pine forest on the mountain as the North Fork Mountain Red Pine Botanical Area.

Another unusual vegetation type on North Fork Mountain is an elfin forest dominated by yellow birch (Betula alleghaniensis), mountain ash (Sorbus americana), and mountain holly.

The oak-and-pine vegetation of North Fork Mountain contrasts strongly with the more diverse vegetation of the nearby mountains just west of the North Fork River, such as Spruce Mountain and the Allegheny Front, which receive considerably more rainfall. The lower slopes of those mountains are covered by mixed Appalachian hardwood forests dominated by sugar maple (Acer saccharum), beech (Fagus grandifolia), and yellow birch (Betula alleghaniensis), with red spruce (Picea rubens) abundant at higher elevations. Fraser magnolia (Magnolia fraseri) occurs on the slopes of the Allegheny Front, becoming abundant westward, but is not known from North Fork Mountain.

The contrast is also great between North Fork Mountain's quartzite-outcrop vegetation and the superficially similar vegetation of the rocky sandstone-conglomerate openings of Spruce Knob, Dolly Sods, and similar sites just west of North Fork Mountain. While North Fork Mountain's lesser rainfall is a substantial factor in this difference, another consideration is the nature of the bedrock itself. North Fork Mountain's fine-grained Tuscarora quartzite erodes into sand, which either quickly disperses or persists in cracks and crevices, sometimes even forming tiny dunelets on wide, nearly flat open outcrops, as on Panther Knob. On the other hand, the various mountains along the Allegheny Front immediately west of North Fork Mountain are capped instead by the coarse Pottsville sandstone conglomerate, which erodes instead primarily into gravel rather than sand. While many widespread Appalachian rock-outcrop species are shared between the two areas, openings on Dolly Sods lack the silvery nailwort, the white alumroot, and table-mountain pine, and instead support a greater species diversity, even including such wetland plants as the small cranberry (Vaccinium oxycoccos).

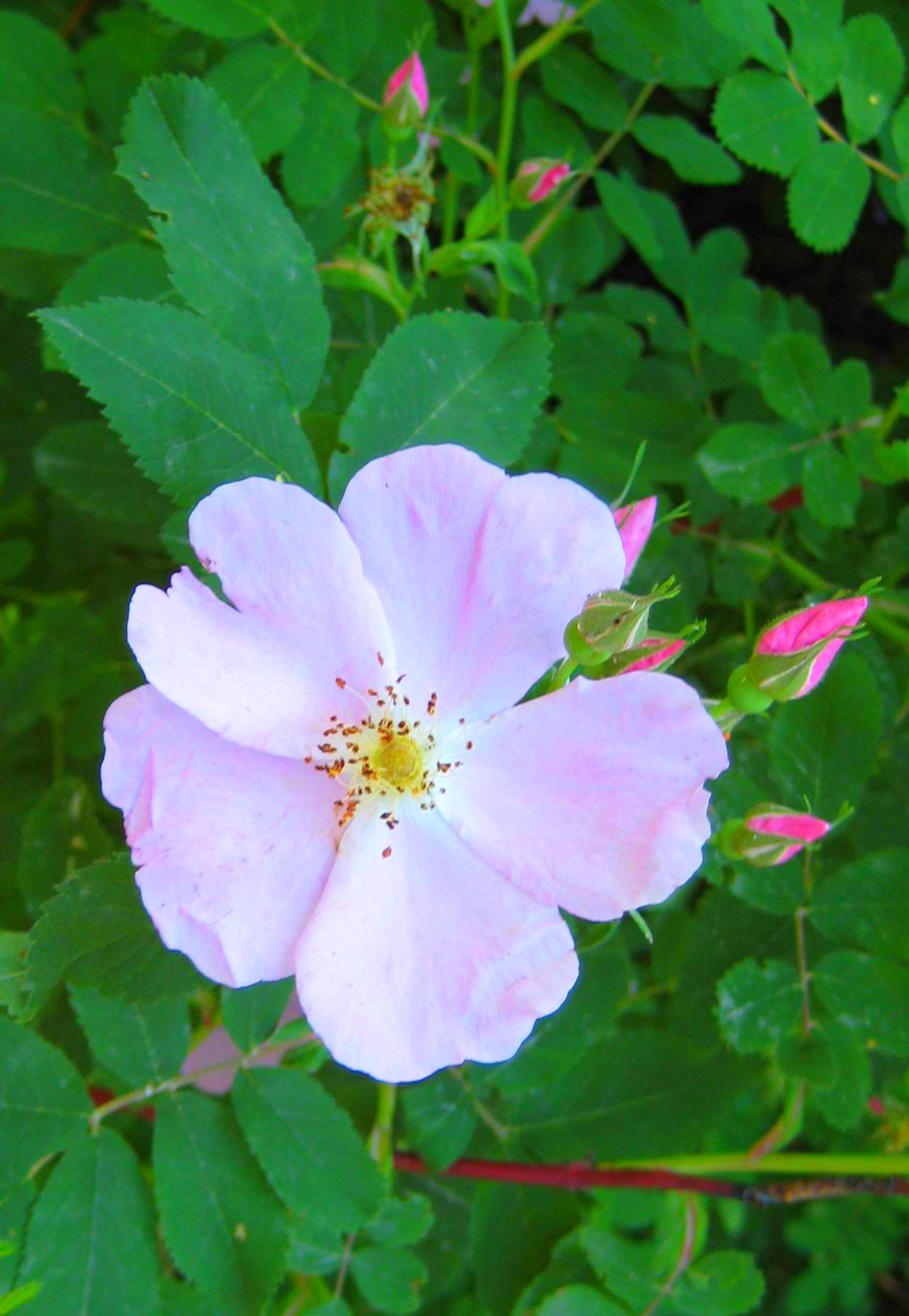
Bristly rose (Rosa acicularis), has its southernmost known occurrence at Pike Knob on North Fork Mountain

Paper birch (Betula papyrifera) groves thrive along Little Creek and on Pike Knob. This widespread northern tree is quite rare this far south. Other rare plant species on the mountain's slopes include butternut (Juglans cinerea), Smoke Hole bergamot (Monarda fistulosa var. brevis), Appalachian oak fern (Gymnocarpium appalachianum), Allegheny onion (Allium alleghaniense), and American chestnut.

Pike Knob supports not only extensive red pine (Pinus resinosa) stands but also various Appalachian-endemic species such as rusty woodsia (Woodsia ilvensis), as well as boreal species such as the three-toothed cinquefoil (Sibbaldiopsis tridentata) and the bristly rose (Rosa acicularis), here at its southernmost known stand.

The cliff-skirted 4,508-foot (1,374 m) summit of Panther Knob supports the world's largest population of variable sedge (Carex polymorpha), a fire-dependent globally vulnerable plant. Beach heather (Hudsonia tomentosa), typically found on coastal dunes, and Michaux's saxifrage (Saxifraga michauxii), a Southern Appalachian rock-outcrop endemic, also occur there.

=== Fauna ===
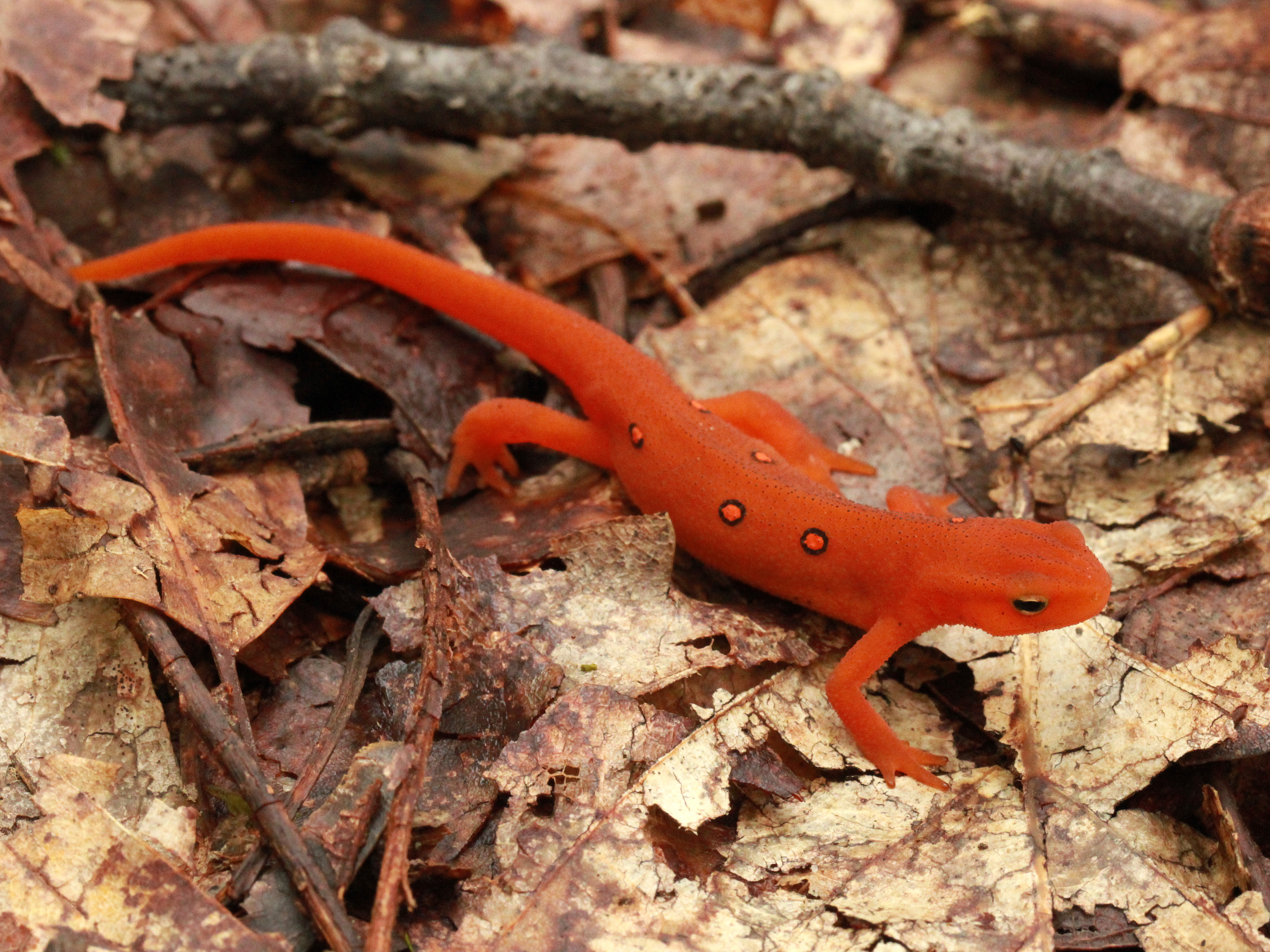
A "red eft" (juvenile eastern newt) on North Fork Mountain. (Photo taken about 50 m from the Mountain's "Chimney Top" outcropping.)

Wildlife on North Fork Mountain includes whitetail deer, wild turkey, black bear, Coyotes, bobcats, gray foxes, timber rattlesnakes, eastern newts, and a variety of other bird, mammal, reptile, and amphibian species.

Two U.S. Fish and Wildlife Service Species of Concern are found on North Fork Mountain, the peregrine falcon and the Allegheny woodrat. Golden eagles are also known there. Various locally abundant but globally rare species of bats that roost in nearby limestone caverns are also often seen foraging over North Fork Mountain's western slopes. The pink-edged sulphur butterfly is known from Panther Knob, Its caterpillars feed on the blueberries that thrive atop this knob after fires.

== Scenery and recreation ==
Views westward overlooking the North Fork River abound from many of North Fork Mountain's rocky outcrops. Places visible to the west from points on the ridgetop may include the River Knobs (including Seneca Rocks and Champe Rocks), the Germany Valley, the Fore Knobs, Hopeville Gorge, Spruce Mountain and Spruce Knob, and the Allegheny Front.

North Fork Mountain and the River Knobs feature prominently in views from the mountaintops immediately west of the North Fork Valley, including Spruce Knob and Dolly Sods.

Nelson Sods on North Fork Mountain has views of the Roaring Plains, Spruce Mountain, and the North Fork Valley, as well as Shenandoah Mountain to the east. Similar views are also offered by other open summits on the mountain.

State Route 28 follows the North Fork River from North Fork Gap south to Cherry Grove, offering diverse views of the River Knobs and North Fork Mountain to the east and the Fore Knobs, Allegheny Front, and Spruce Mountain to the west.

The Germany Valley Overlook on U.S. 33, on the west side of North Fork Mountain near Judy Gap, offers views of the Germany Valley and North Fork Valley, the River Knobs and the Fore Knobs, Spruce Mountain and Spruce Knob, and the Allegheny Front extending northwards toward Dolly Sods, as well as a view back to the sandstone cliffs along the crest of North Fork Mountain itself.

Panther Knob is easily viewed from the west from Snowy Mountain Road south of Cherry Grove. Other views of Seneca Rocks and North Fork Mountain are offered by U.S. 33 as it descends the Allegheny Front approaching Seneca Rocks, and by SR 28 approaching Cherry Grove from the southwest. North Fork Gap and the eastern sides of North Fork and New Creek mountains may be seen from SR 28 west of Petersburg, with the Dolly Sods portion of the Allegheny Front visible beyond the gap.

The 23.8-mile-long North Fork Mountain Trail (NFMT) follows much of the crest of the northern portion of the mountain. The trail's southern terminus is where U.S. Route 33 crosses the ridge and the northern terminus is on Smoke Hole Road, near the top of the canyon. This trail was called the best trail in West Virginia by Outside magazine. Much of the southern portion of the trail crosses private property. While hiking is generally permitted, hunting and bikes are not.

== Variant names ==
North Fork Mountain is also widely referred to as North Mountain.

== Photo gallery ==
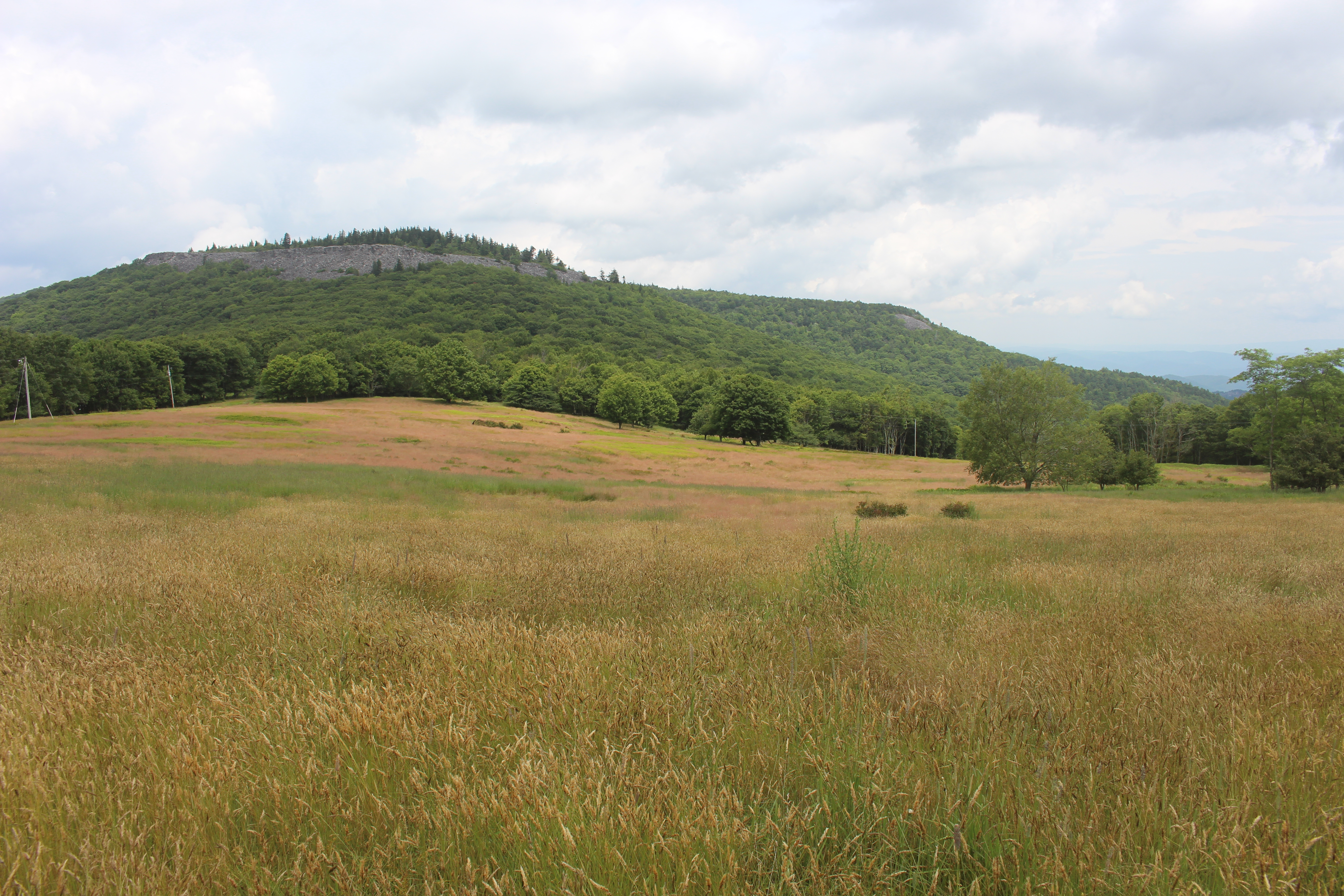
Kile Knob from Goshen Ridge, North Fork Mountain, WV

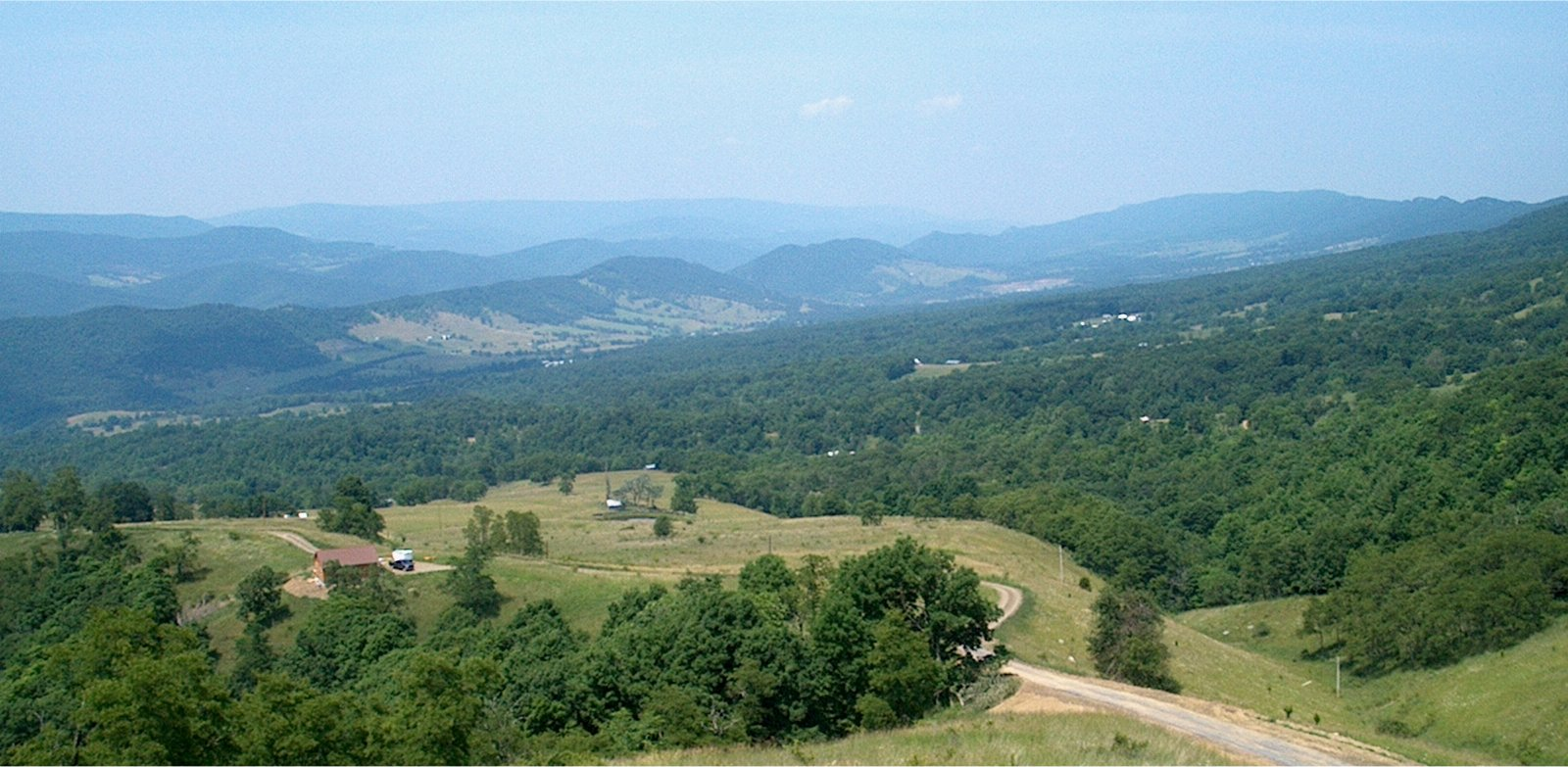
Germany Valley, with North Fork Mountain to the east on right

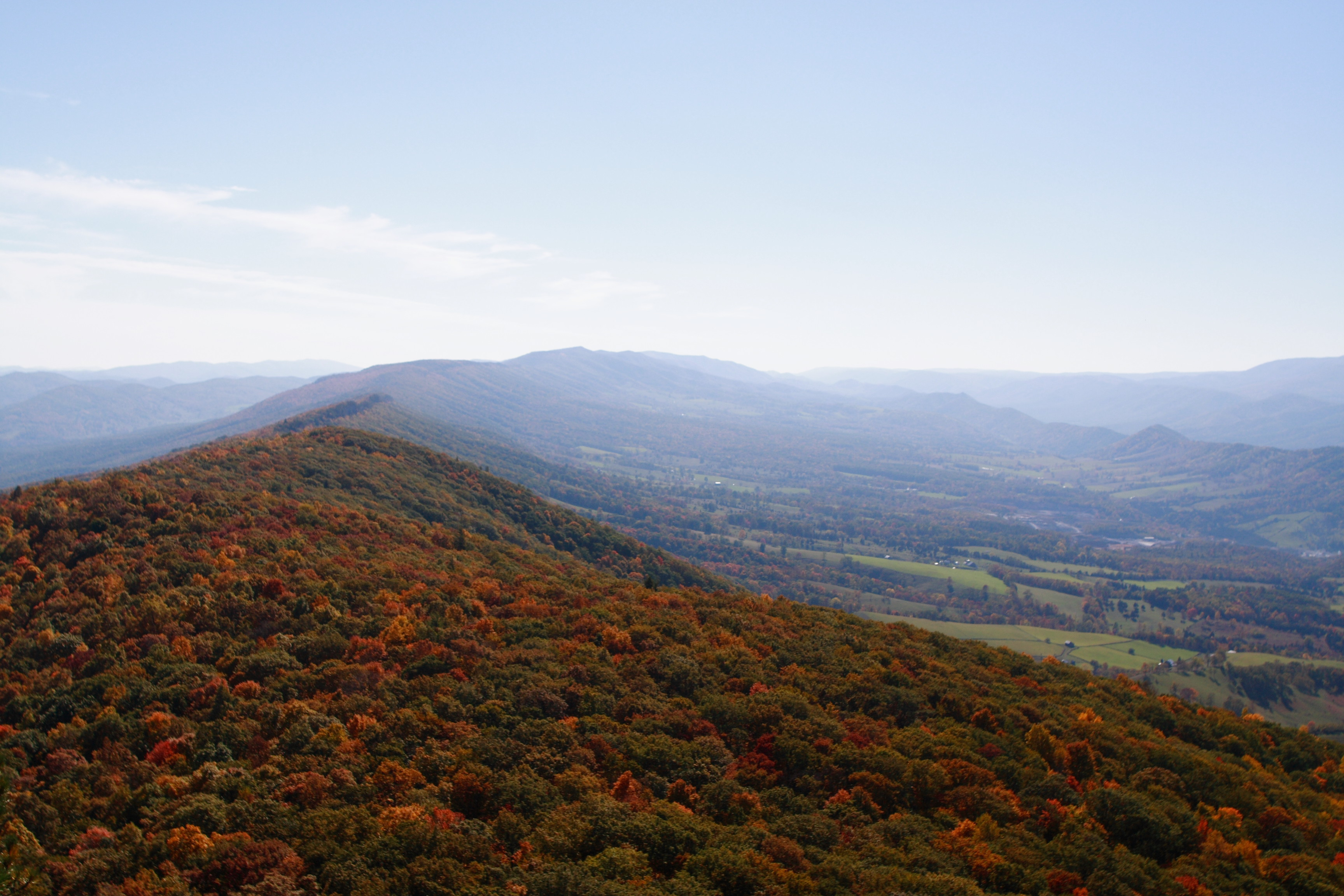
Overview of North Fork Mountain

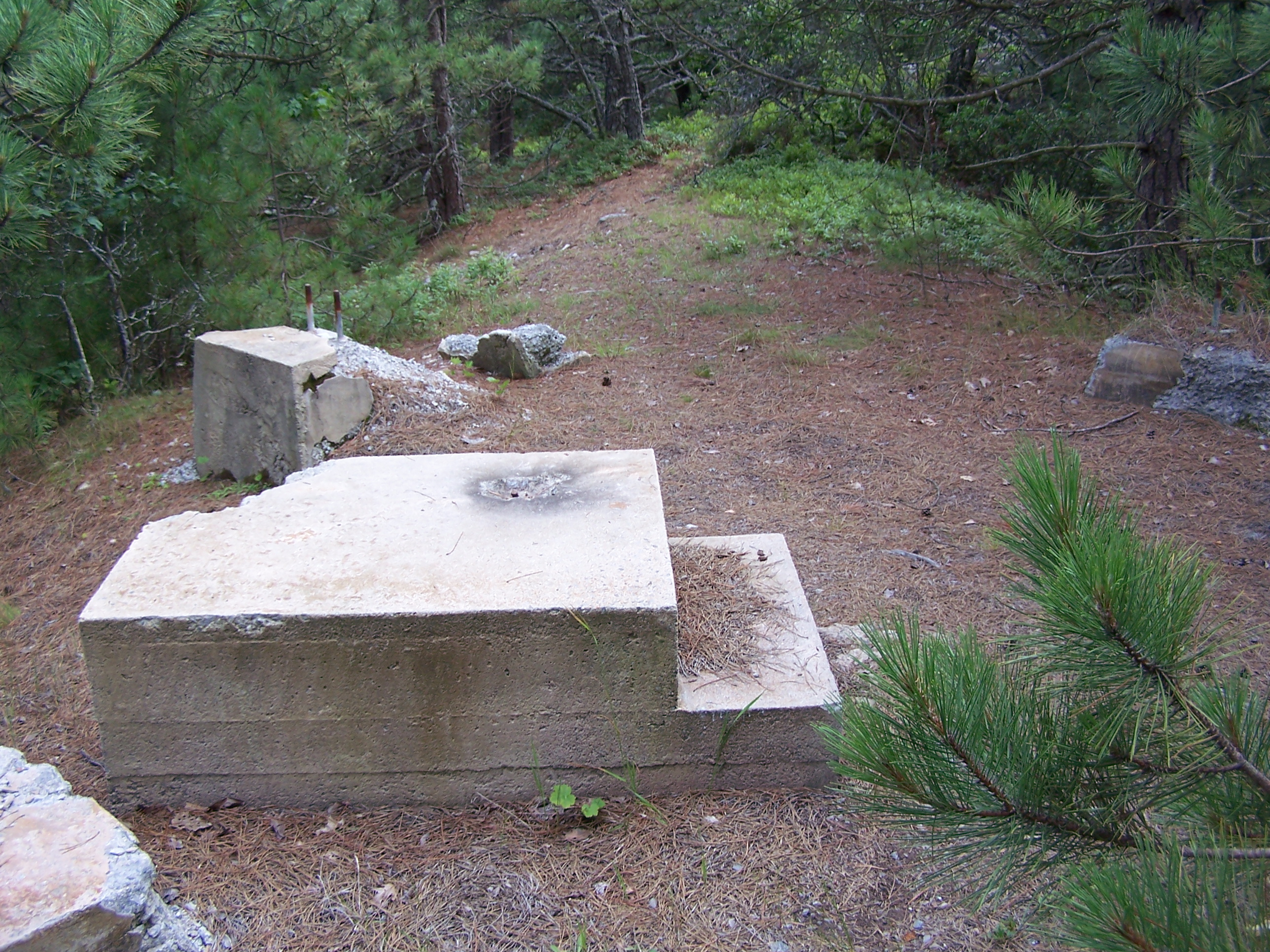
Former Pike Knob Fire Tower footings
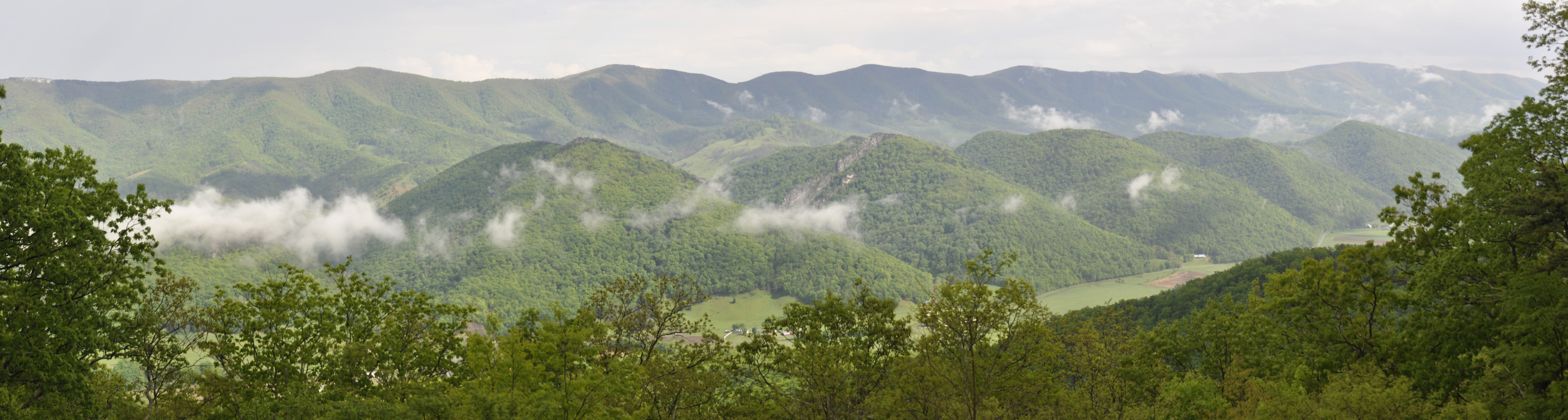
The River Knobs and Nelson Rocks (middle distance) beneath the crest of North Fork Mountain

== See also ==
- List of old growth forests
