= Monkeytown =

Monkey Town or Monkeytown may refer to:

- Monkeytown, West Virginia
- Moncton, New Brunswick
- Monkey Town, a historical nickname for Dayton, Tennessee, the location of the Scopes Trial
- Monkey Town (novel), a 2006 novel about the 1925 Scopes Trial
- Monkeytown (album), a 2011 studio album by Modeselektor
- Monkey Town Continental Team, a Dutch cycling team
