= River Knobs (West Virginia) =

Ridge and series of knobs in Pendleton County, West Virginia

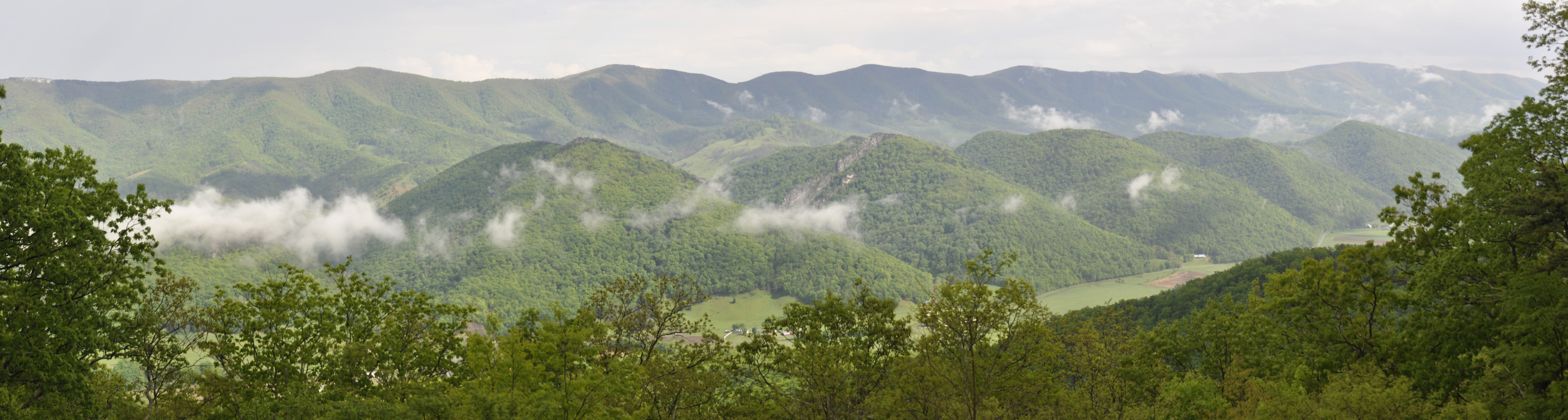
- The River Knobs around Nelson Rocks

Highest point
- Elevation: 2,854 ft (870 m)
- Coordinates: 38°44′13″N 79°26′05″W

Geography
- Location: Pendleton County, West Virginia, U.S.
- Parent range: Allegheny Mountains, part of the Ridge-and-Valley Appalachians
- Topo map: USGS ?????

For other "River Knobs", see River Knobs (disambiguation).

The River Knobs — formerly known as East Seneca Ridge — are a ridge and series of knobs in western Pendleton County, West Virginia, USA, along a stretch of the North Fork South Branch Potomac River. Although the Knobs (peak elevation: 2,854 ft) are dwarfed by Spruce Mountain to the west (peak: 4,840 ft) and by North Fork Mountain to the east (peak: 4,588 ft), they are notable for their series of prominent "razorback" ridges or "fins". The largest and most famous of these blade-like crags is Seneca Rocks.

== Geography ==
The River Knobs stretch for about 18 miles (29 km) from near Cherry Grove to near Seneca Rocks and are situated in a southwest/northeast orientation. They are a minor part of the High Alleghenies of the Appalachian Mountains. Their rock outcrops are clearly visible from WV 55 and US 33. Each is associated with a named gap through which a stream has transected the ridge and exposed the bedrock. From north to south the most prominent features are Roy Gap (with its Seneca Rocks), Harper Knob (2,820 ft), Harper Gap, Harmon Knob (2,854 ft), Hinkle Gap, Germany Knob (2,802 ft), Riverton Gap, Judy Gap (with its Judy Rocks), Nelson Gap (with its Nelson Rocks), False Gap, Lambert Gap, Pike Gap and Teter Gap.

The Knobs are part of the same structural fold of the Earth's crust that continues to the north as Champe Knobs (with its Champe Rocks and Yellow Rocks) and to the south as River Hill and (in Virginia) Lantz Mountain.

== Geology ==
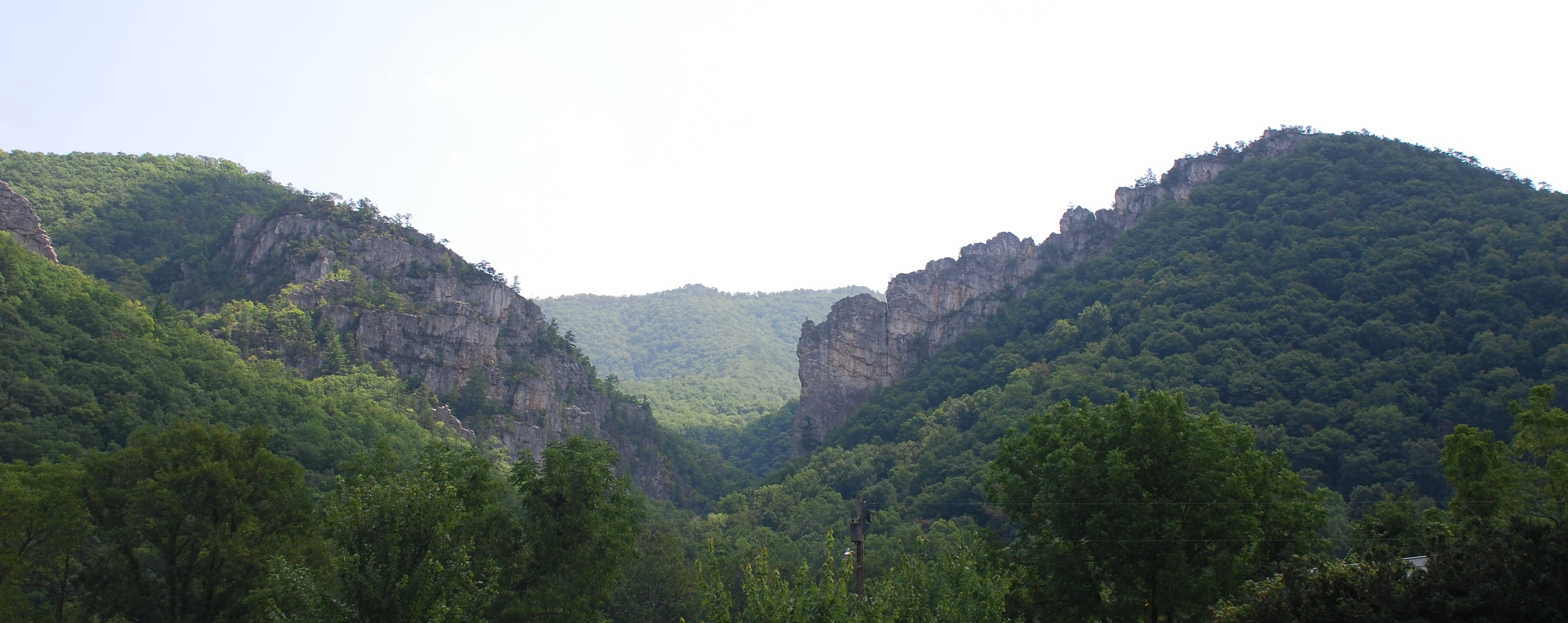
Champe Rocks, at the northern end of the River Knobs

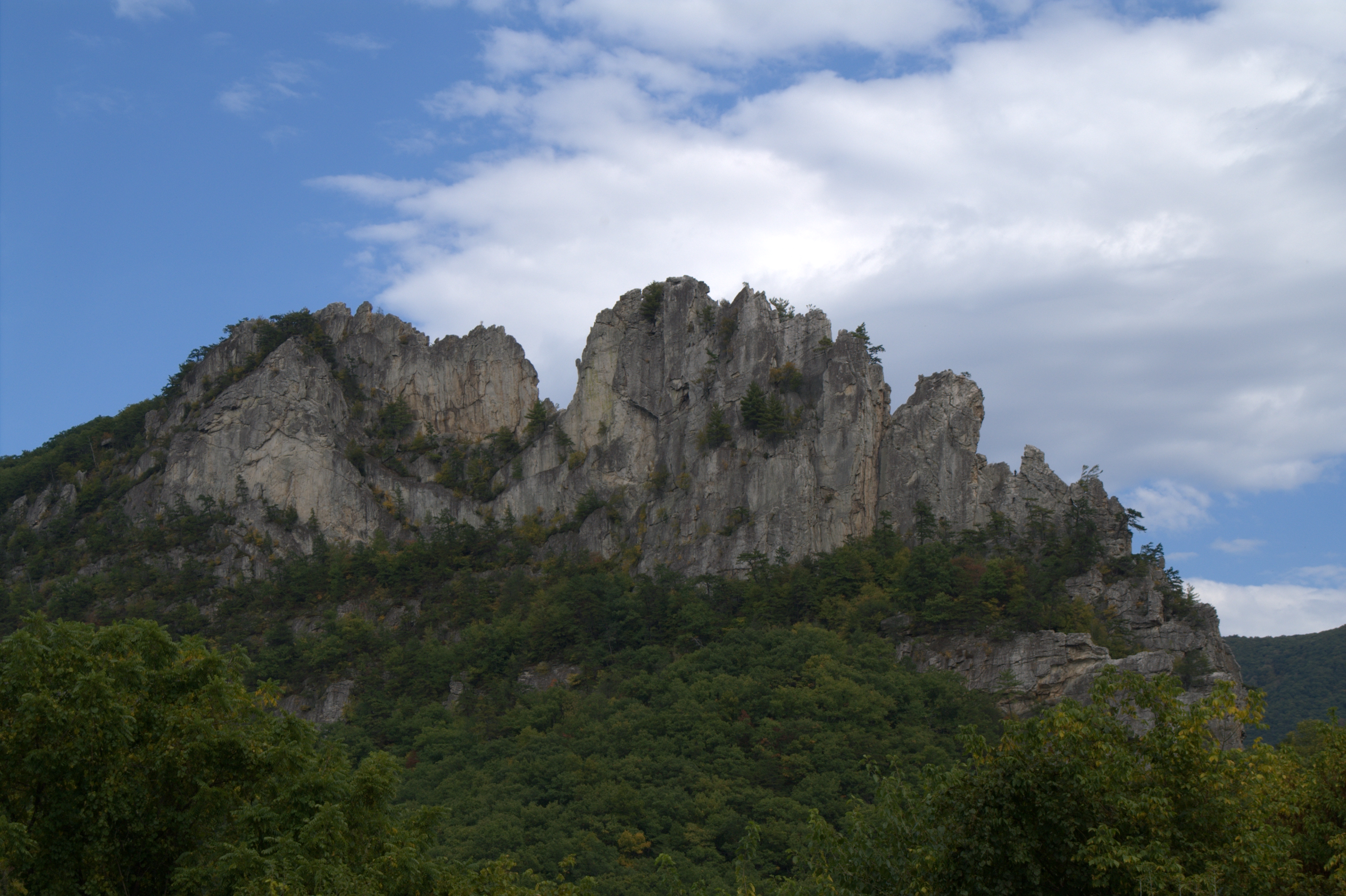
Seneca Rocks

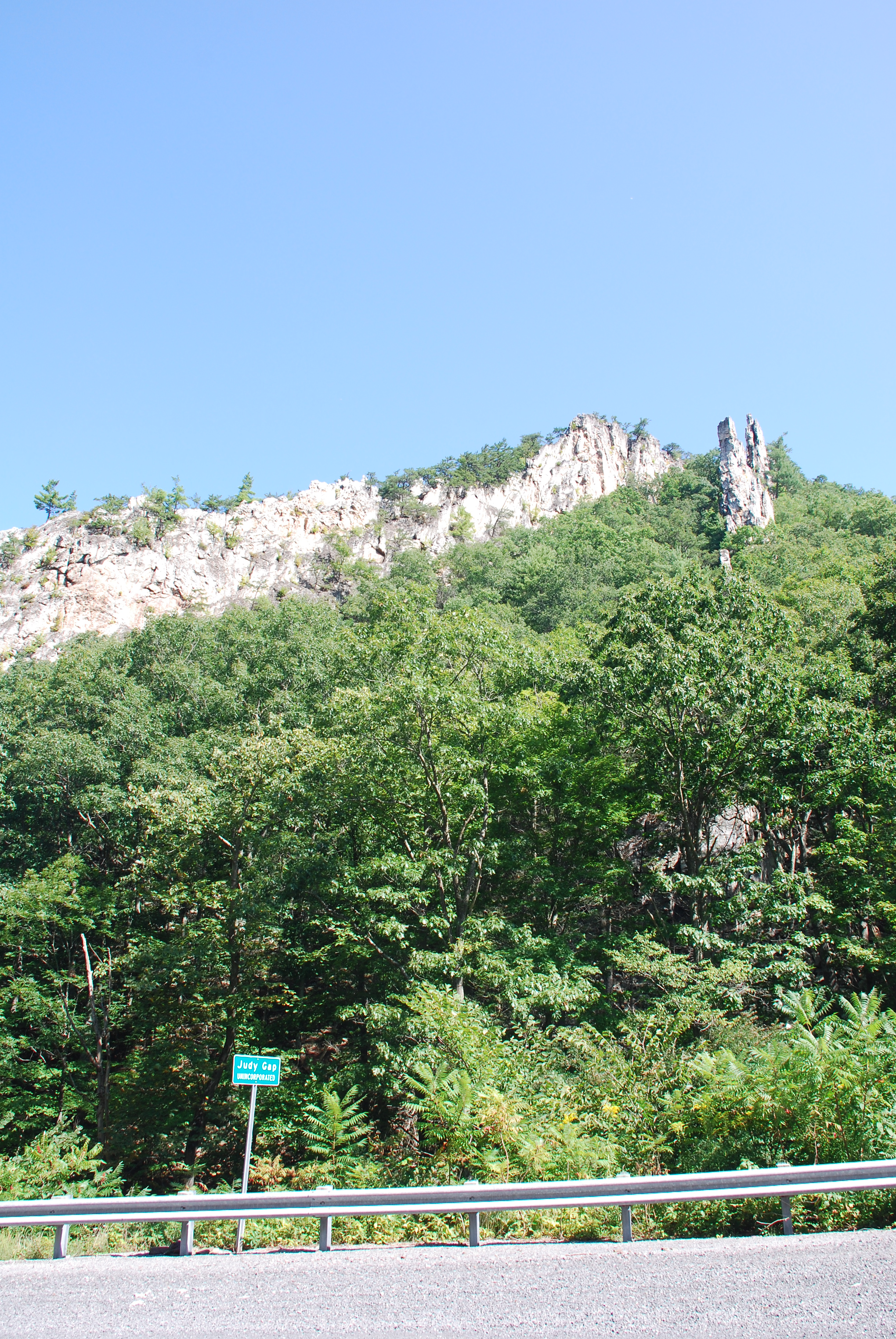
Judy Rocks

The exposed rock of the River Knobs is a tough quartzite, Tuscarora Sandstone, an extremely hard sedimentary rock, ranging in color from a nearly translucent white, to gray, pink or orange. Laid down as sediment on a sea floor 440 million years ago, in West Virginia the Tuscarora is 150 to 250 feet (76 m) thick. At the River Knobs, the quartzite layer has been "verticalized" by geological forces during the formation of the Appalachians some 230 million years ago. A folding of the Earth's crust forced this layer - and the surrounding strata - into enormous arches, miles wide. The River Knobs trace the western wall of this arch, or anticline, where the Tuscarora was turned a full 90 degrees from horizontal to vertical. Over time, erosion stripped away the softer rock covering the arch, and finally the dome of the arch itself. The tough quartzite of the western walls resisted this process, leaving the soaring "fins" - narrow vertical plates of exposed rock. About 2 miles (3.2 km) east, along the top of North Fork Mountain, the horizontal strata of the far slope of the Tuscarora anticline are also visible. (Within this eroded anticline lies Germany Valley, registered as a National Natural Landmark because of its unique karst topography.)

At Champe Rocks and Nelson Rocks the outcroppings are seen as not one, but two parallel fins. The reason for this is that, during the rise of the Appalachians, the same forces which formed the anticline caused the Tuscarora to fault or rupture, with the upper layer sliding over and overlapping the lower. As the top of the arch wore away, two fins were left. Nelson Rocks is considered one of the best examples of the "faulted Tuscarora". Seneca Rocks is a much thicker, monolithic formation because there the rock did not fault cleanly into two layers, but rather rolled over on itself. From Roy Gap, looking north, this effect is clearly visible in the curving layers of rock surrounding the large cave in the south end of Seneca Rocks.

== Miscellany ==
- Nelson Rocks Preserve features a via ferrata (one of only six in North America), along with a rope bridge, 200 feet (61 m) long and 150 feet (46 m) high.
