= Spruce Mountain (West Virginia) =

Highest point in the state of West Virginia

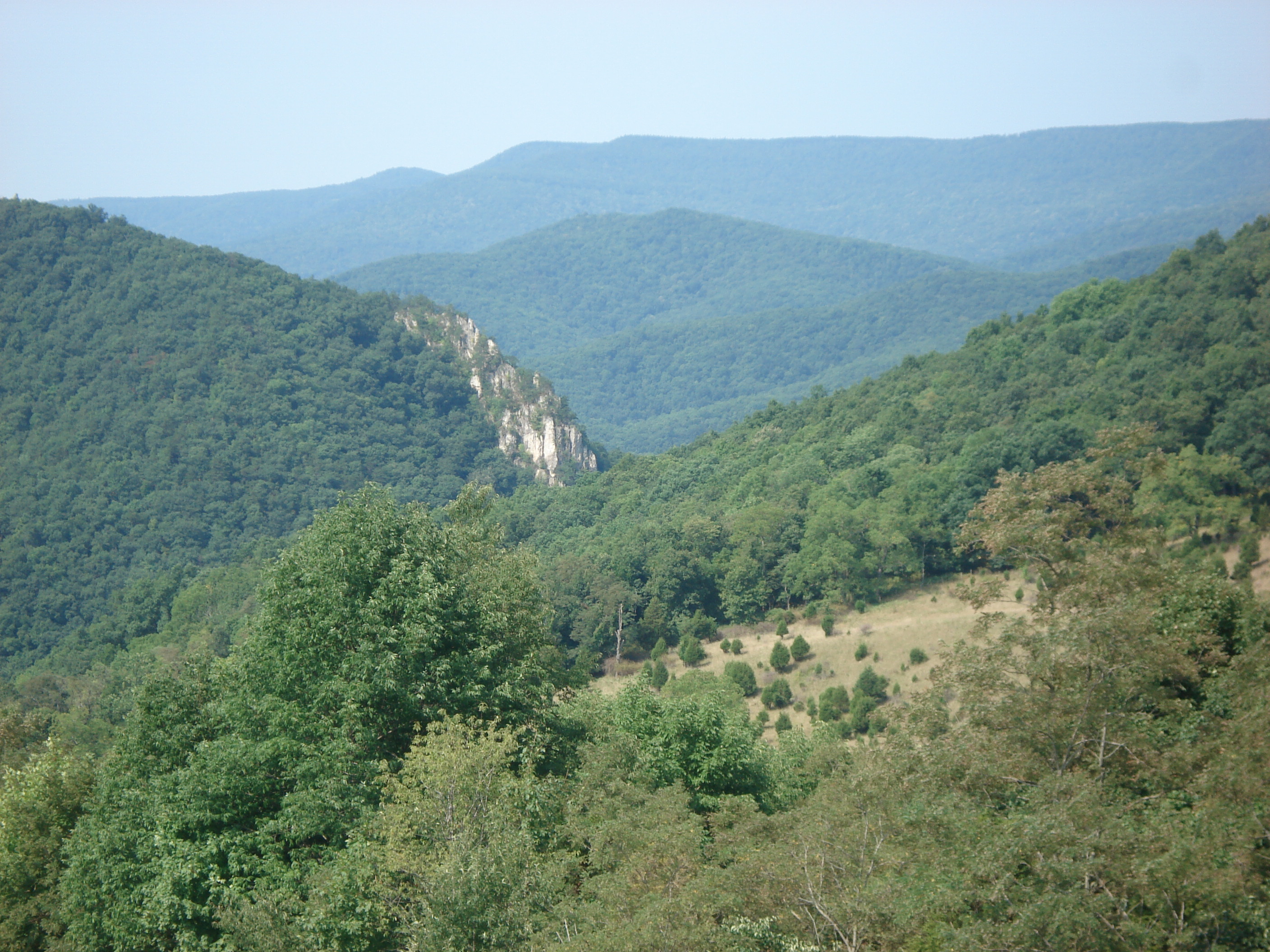
- Spruce Mountain (in the distance) beyond the River Knobs (Judy Rocks, foreground) and the Fore Knobs (middle distance)

Highest point
- Peak: Spruce Knob, Pendleton County, West Virginia
- Elevation: 4,863 ft (1,482 m)
- Coordinates: 38°41′59″N 79°31′58″W

Dimensions
- Length: 16 mi (26 km)approximately

Geography
- Location within West Virginia
- Country: United States
- State: West Virginia
- County: Pendleton
- Range coordinates: 38°45′N 79°29′W
- Parent range: Allegheny Mountains, part of the Ridge-and-Valley Appalachians
- Topo map: USGS

Spruce Mountain, located in eastern West Virginia, is the highest ridge of the Allegheny Mountains. The whale-backed ridge extends for only 16 miles (26 km) from northeast to southwest, but several of its peaks exceed 4,500 feet (1,400 m) in elevation. The summit, Spruce Knob (4,863 ft; 1,482 m), is the highest point both in West Virginia and in the entire Allegheny range, which spans four states.

== Geography ==
Spruce Mountain lies mostly within the Spruce Knob–Seneca Rocks National Recreation Area, a U.S. National Recreation Area (NRA) located within the Monongahela National Forest (MNF) in Pendleton County. It extends from the vicinity of Onego in the north to near Cherry Grove in the south. Brushy Run separates Timber Ridge — a spur of the main mountain — to the east. The ridgelines of Spruce Mountain and Timber Ridge continue to the north of US Route 33 as Hoffman Ridge and Smith Mountain, respectively. To the south (south of West Virginia 28) the line continues as Big Mountain.

Prominent peaks of Spruce Mountain, north to south, are Horse Rock (4,536 ft; 1,383 m), Spruce Mountain Peak (4,586 ft; 1,398 m), Picea Benchmark (4,613 ft; 1,406 m), and Spruce Knob itself. Spruce Knob is the highest point in the eastern United States between the Adirondacks of New York and Mount Rogers (part of the Blue Ridge Mountains) in southern Virginia.

The summit of Spruce Knob has a definite alpine feel, much more so than most other mountains of the southern Appalachians. The upper few hundred feet are covered in a dense spruce forest, a relic boreal forest environment similar to those found in northern New England and Canada. The summit is accessible both via trails and a paved Forest Service road, and is crowned with a stone lookout tower amid a mixture of boulder fields, meadows and trees. A handicap-accessible nature trail one-half mile (0.80 km) long circles the topmost part of the mountain. High west winds near the summit have gnarled the spruce there like Krummholz, flagged with limbs only on their leeward (eastward) side.

As is typical in the southern Appalachians, the highest point on a ridge is frequently referred to as a knob or dome. Spruce Knob is the highest point along a ridge known as the Allegheny Front. Dropping steeply to the east, it offers views of the Germany Valley and North Fork Mountain; to the west is the Allegheny Plateau. It also is the highest point in the Chesapeake Bay Watershed.

== Geology ==
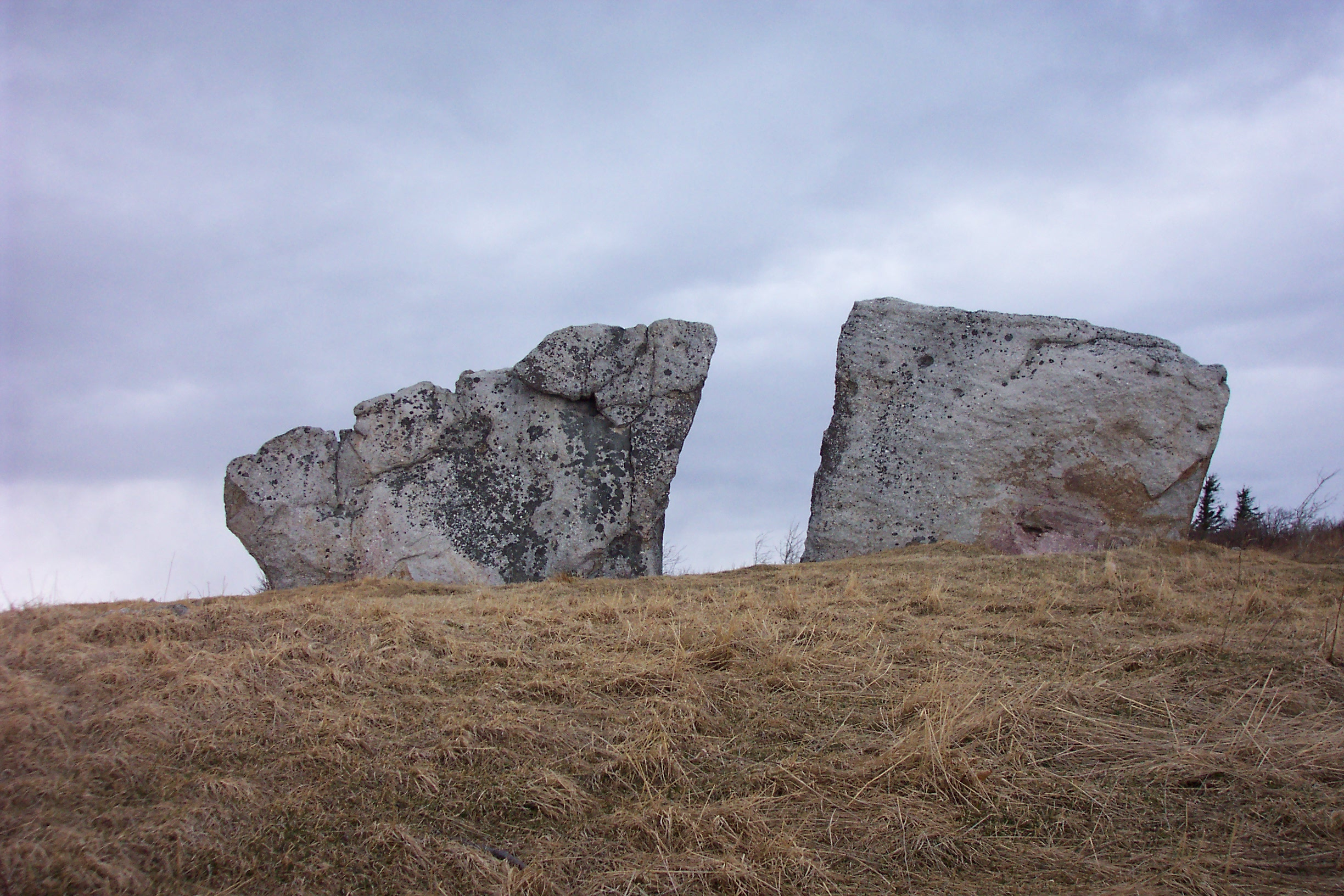
Boulders on the summit

Like the rest of this part of the Appalachian Mountains, Spruce Knob began to form with the breakup of Pangea I. The African Plate separated from the North American Plate opening the Proto-Atlantic Ocean. The North American Plate stretched and thinned, allowing it to backfill with a shallow inland sea. About 50 million years later, with the Taconic Orogeny, the two plates reversed course and began to move towards each other. Mid-ocean subduction created a volcanic arc (now known as the Blue Ridge Mountains) which eventually collided with the North American Plate. The arc fused onto the continent and the land to the west was uplifted.

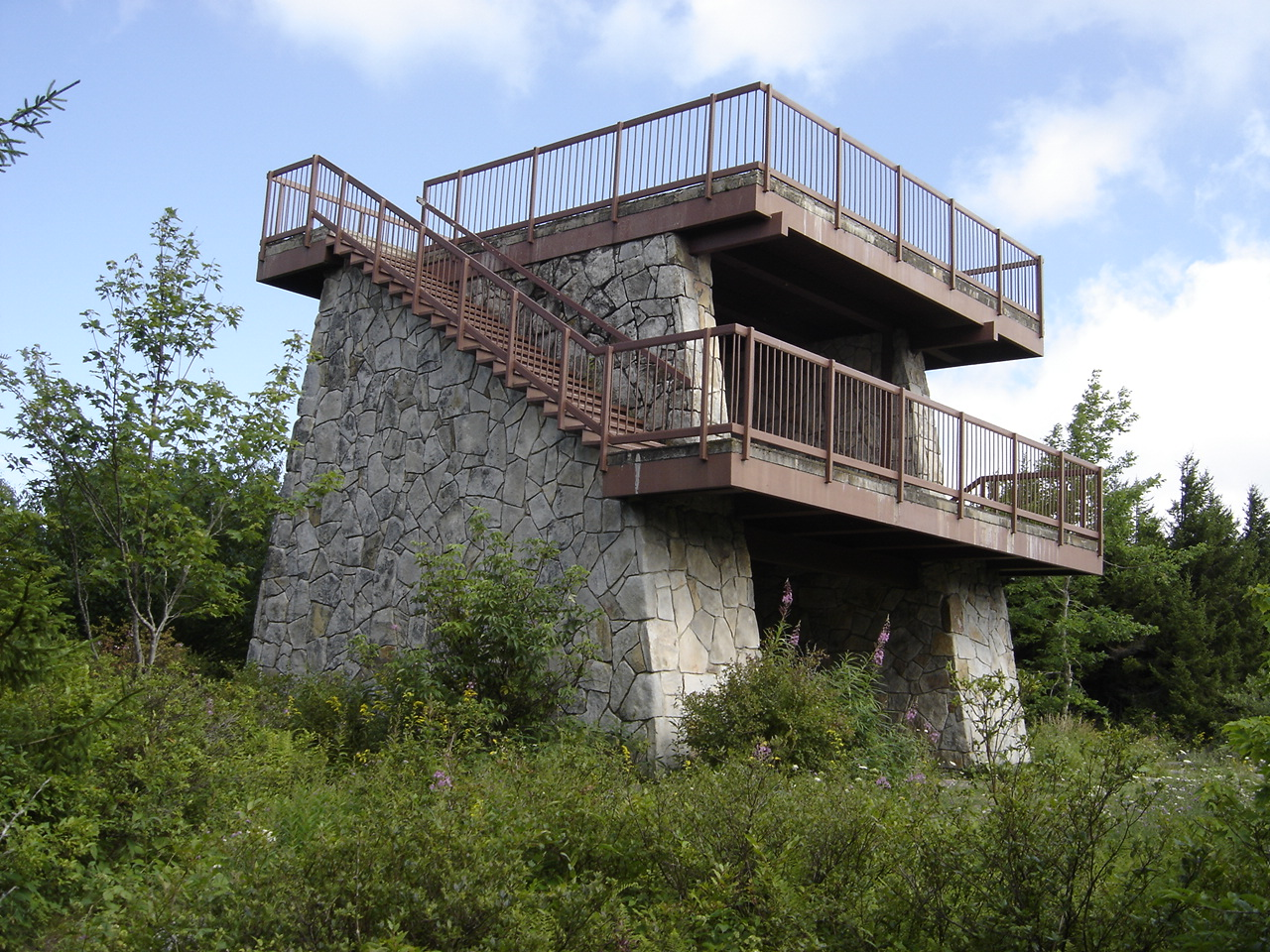
The lookout tower atop Spruce Knob

The accumulation of shells and other hard parts of marine organisms (made of CaCO_{3}, calcium carbonate) at the bottom of the shallow inland sea cemented into a layer of Greenbrier Limestone. The shallow inland sea began to retreat with the uplift. This caused fine grains of mud and silt to settle out and lithify into a layer of Mauch Chunk Shale on top of the Greenbrier Limestone. As the Blue Ridge eroded, rivers carried sediment down to the low-lying areas that formed a layer of Pottsville Conglomerate on top of the shale. The large boulders on the summit are remnants of this layer, and outcrops of both Mauch Chunk Shale and Greenbrier Limestone can be found lower on the mountain.

When the North American and African Plates finally collided around 250 mya, it caused a massive uplift that folded and faulted these layers of sedimentary rock. Spruce Knob was originally in the bottom (syncline) of one of these folds, but over time cracks in the Pottsville Conglomerate in the higher elevations allowed it to erode quickly, and the softer layers of shale and limestone were quick to follow. This left Spruce Knob as the highest point in the landscape. Spruce Knob (Spruce Mountain) is the westernmost extent of this intense folding and faulting. To the west, the Allegheny Plateau is composed of more gently sloping hills and dendritic drainages.

== Climate ==
Spruce Knob's climate can be classified as cold continental or highland. Summers are cool and often damp, with thunderstorms common both in spring and summer. Winters are cold and snowy, with an average of around 180 inches (4.6 m) of annual snowfall leaving the summit access road often impassible between October and April. Blizzard conditions can develop in minutes behind cold frontal passages and last days with upslope snowfall continuing with northwest winds, making travel on the mountain dangerous during the colder months. This mountain can receive high winds year-round; red spruce deformed by constant exposure to strong westerly winds are scattered across its rocky ridges.

== Ecology ==
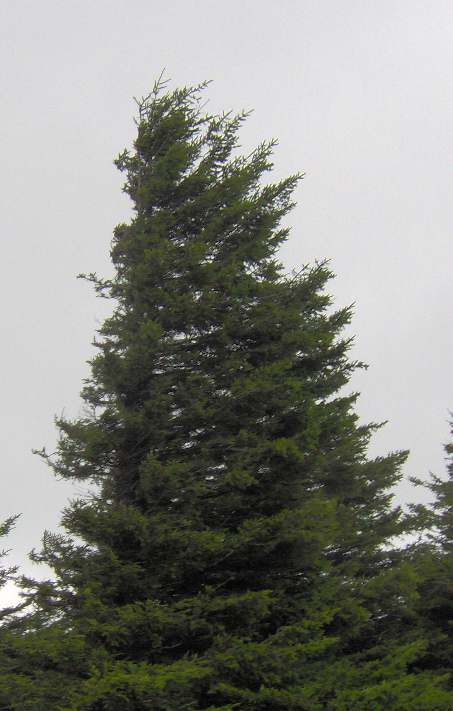
Windswept spruce

=== Flora ===
As with almost the entirety of the MNF, most of the original Spruce Mountain upland forest was completely denuded by logging around the turn of the 20th century and now consists of second- or third-growth forest. (The only documented exception to this on the mountain is the 17-acre (69,000 m^{2}) North Spruce Mountain Old Growth Site.) The present second-growth forest of Spruce Mountain is characterized by a dominance of sugar maple (Acer saccharum), American beech (Fagus grandifolia), and yellow birch (Betula lutea). Other characteristic species of the mixed mesophytic forest region are also present: tuliptree (Liriodendron tulipifera), basswood (Tilia heterophylla, T.floridana, T. neglecta), chestnut (Castanea dentata), yellow buckeye (Aesculus flava), red oak (Quercus borealis), white oak (Q. alba), and eastern hemlock (Tsuga canadensis). The upper reaches of Spruce Mountain also include areas termed northern hardwood and northern evergreen forest types. The former is typified by red oak, white ash (Fraxinus americana), basswood (Tilia spp.), red maple (Acer rubrum), and cherry (Prunus spp.). The latter is dominated by the Mountain's eponymous red spruce (Picea rubens). While not extending above the timberline, the stunted tree growth high on this windy mountaintop is relatively open.

The summit was named for the spruce trees which grow there. Red spruce (Picea rubens) is the most common tree species on the summit. The lower altitudes are populated by oak, hickory, birch, beech and maple.

=== Fauna ===
Bald eagles, hawks and peregrine falcons have been seen on the mountain. Mammals such as black bear, white-tailed deer, weasel, porcupine, skunk and rabbit are also found. The important presence of ruffed grouse (Bonasa umbellus) on the Mountain has been acknowledged by the establishment of the 1,750-acre (7.1 km^{2}) Spruce Mountain Grouse Management Area by the MNF

== Recreation ==
Spruce Knob is within the Spruce Knob–Seneca Rocks National Recreation Area, which in turn is part of Monongahela National Forest. Established in 1965, it was the first National Recreation Area designated by the U.S. Forest Service and includes more than 100,000 acres (40,000 ha).

There are over 75 miles (121 km) of hiking trails around the mountain and a small 25-acre (10 ha) lake well stocked with trout on the west side of the mountain. Two campgrounds are also on the mountain.

Hiking trails — Huckleberry Trail, Lumberjack Trail, Spruce Mountain Trail — extend the length of the ridge. There are over 75 miles (121 km) of trails around the Mountain and a small 25 acres (10 hectares) lake well stocked with trout on the west side. There are also two campgrounds on the Mountain; the larger (43 sites) is nearest the lake.

=== Access ===
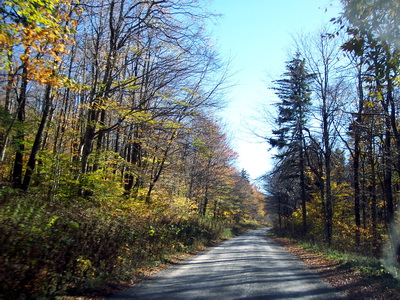
Forest Road 112 leading up to the summit, today paved

Paved access is from U.S. Route 33/West Virginia Route 28 about 2 miles (3.2 km) south of Riverton. Briery Gap Road (County Route 33/4), Forest Road 112 and Forest Road 104 have been reconstructed and paved to provide a hard-surfaced road to the summit.

Forest Roads 104 and 112 are not maintained in the winter. Impassable conditions can be expected any time from mid-October to mid-April.

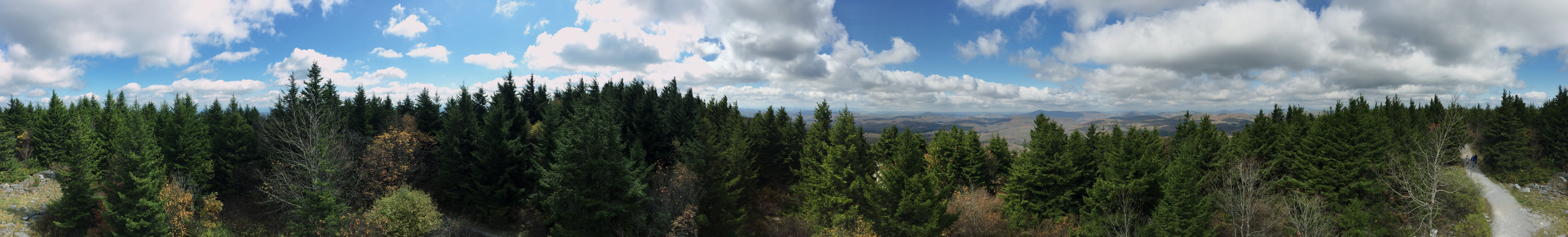
View from the observation tower on Spruce Knob

== See also ==
- List of mountains of the Alleghenies
- List of mountain peaks of North America
  - List of mountain peaks of the United States
    - List of mountains of West Virginia
    - List of U.S. states by elevation
