= River Knobs =

River Knobs is a name applied to several terrain features in the eastern United States, including:

- River Knobs, in Hawkins County, Tennessee
- River Knobs, in Hancock County, Tennessee
- River Knobs, in Rhea County, Tennessee
- River Knobs, in Roane County, Tennessee
- River Knobs, in Lee County, Virginia
- River Knobs, in Washington County, Virginia
- River Knobs (West Virginia), in Pendleton County, West Virginia
