= Rohrbaugh Cabin =

Historic house in West Virginia, United States

- U.S. National Register of Historic Places
- Location within West Virginia Location within the United States
- Location: Smokehole Rd. (County Route 28/11), 3 miles south of junction with WV 28/WV 55, Monongahela National Forest, near Petersburg, West Virginia
- Coordinates: 38°57′20″N 79°14′31″W
- Area: 4.3 acres (1.7 ha)
- Built: c. 1880
- Architectural style: Vernacular, Log
- NRHP reference No.: 93000490
- Added to NRHP: November 3, 1993

Rohrbaugh Cabin — also known as Allegheny Cabin — is a historic log cabin located on the eastern slope of North Fork Mountain near Petersburg, Grant County, West Virginia, USA.

Rohrbaugh Cabin was built about 1880, and is a 2 1/2-story, "double pen" plan log house built of tulip poplar logs. It measures 26 feet, two inches long, and 16 feet, 6 inches, deep. Also on the property are a frame storage shed, a log animal pen, stone springhouse remains, and portions of the original Smokehole roadbed.

Rohrbaugh Cabin was listed on the National Register of Historic Places in 1993.
