= Monkeytown, West Virginia =

Monkeytown
- Unincorporated community
- Location within the state of West Virginia Monkeytown (the United States)
- Coordinates: 38°42′18″N 79°25′56″W
- Country: United States
- State: West Virginia
- County: Pendleton
- Elevation: 2,795 ft (852 m)
- Time zone: UTC-5 (Eastern (EST))
  - Summer (DST): UTC-4 (EDT)
- GNIS feature ID: 2634635

Monkeytown is a small hamlet in Pendleton County, West Virginia, United States, on the mountain slope above the hamlet of Riverton. It is located on U.S. Route 33 on the western face of North Fork Mountain.

This town was never incorporated as a town, but has existed as an area relevant to local people. The area was inhabited by Native American tribes long before being settled by European immigrants. Those who now live in the area are a mixture of German, Swiss, Irish, Scottish, and English descent. The population is now less than fifty people.

== History ==
At one point in the mid 20th century, the town boasted a bus stop, two country stores (one with gasoline pumps), and a post office located in the general store. Today all of these innovations have disappeared; most of the civic works occur in nearby Franklin which is the county seat.
