= Horton, West Virginia =

Horton
- Unincorporated community
- Location within the state of West Virginia Horton (the United States)
- Coordinates: 38°48′26″N 79°32′33″W
- Country: United States
- State: West Virginia
- County: Randolph
- Elevation: 2,799 ft (853 m)
- Time zone: UTC-5 (Eastern (EST))
  - Summer (DST): UTC-4 (EDT)
- GNIS ID: 1554746

Horton is an unincorporated community in Randolph County, West Virginia, United States.
