= Champe Rocks =

Rock formation in West Virginia, US

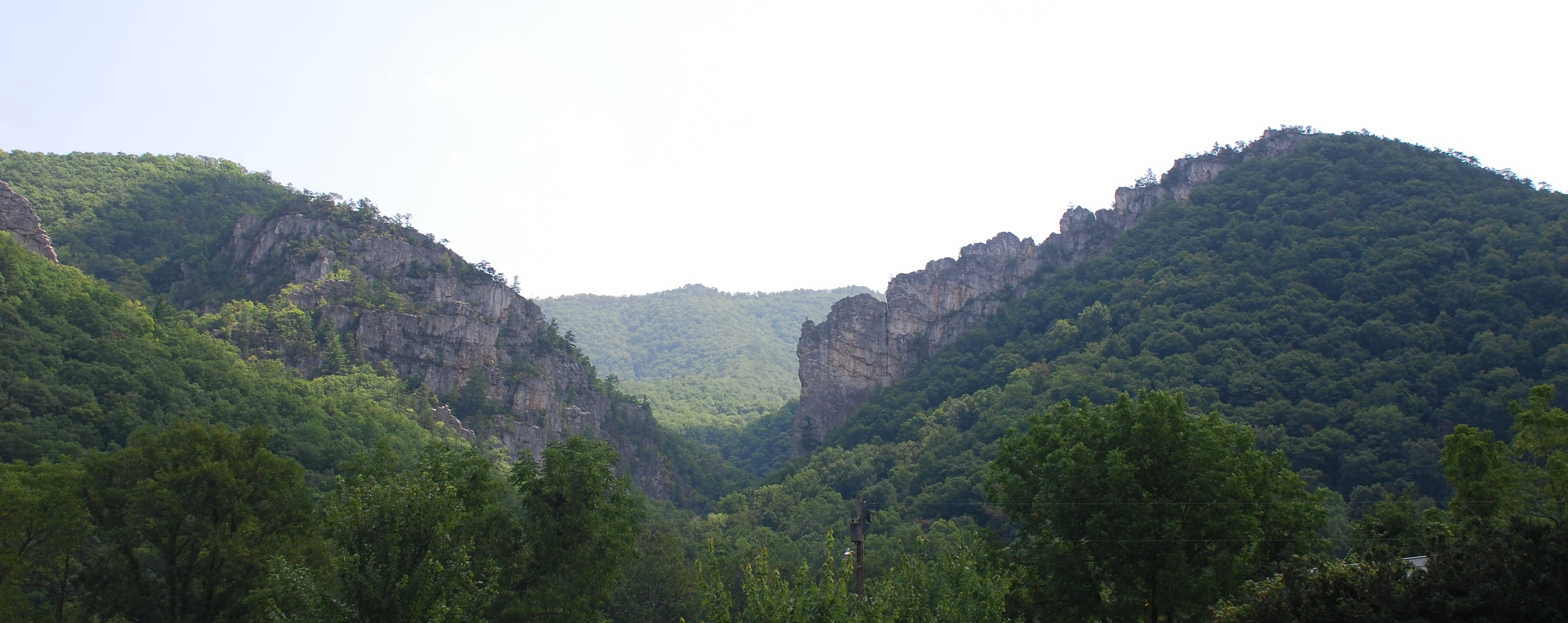

- Location within West Virginia
- Location: Pendleton County, West Virginia, US
- Nearest city: Seneca Rocks, West Virginia
- Range: Appalachians
- Coordinates: 38°53′29″N 79°18′42″W
- Type of climbing: traditional and sport crag
- Height range: 330 feet
- Technical grades: Mixed leaning towards expert
- NCCS grades: I and II
- Rock type: Tuscarora quartzite
- Quantity of routes: Month's worth
- Climbing area developed: Developed
- Cliff aspect: East and west
- Season: Spring to fall
- Ownership: National Forest (but most direct access is through private land)
- Camping: None
- Classic climbs: Psychotic Reaction (5.9), Fintasia (5.11+), Enchampement (5.11+)
- Stars: 2/5 stars

Champe Rocks are a pair of large crags in Pendleton County in the Eastern Panhandle of West Virginia. Easily visible from West Virginia Route 28, they are situated within the Spruce Knob–Seneca Rocks National Recreation Area. They are — along with the nearby and more celebrated Seneca Rocks — the most imposing examples in eastern West Virginia of several formations of the white/gray Tuscarora quartzite and are a popular challenge for rock climbers.

Champe Knobs, from which the Rocks emerge, are a northern extension of the River Knobs, which contain other similar "razorback" ridges or "fins" such as Judy Rocks at Judy Gap, and Nelson Rocks at Nelson Gap. Champe Rocks are 2,257 feet above sea level.

== History ==
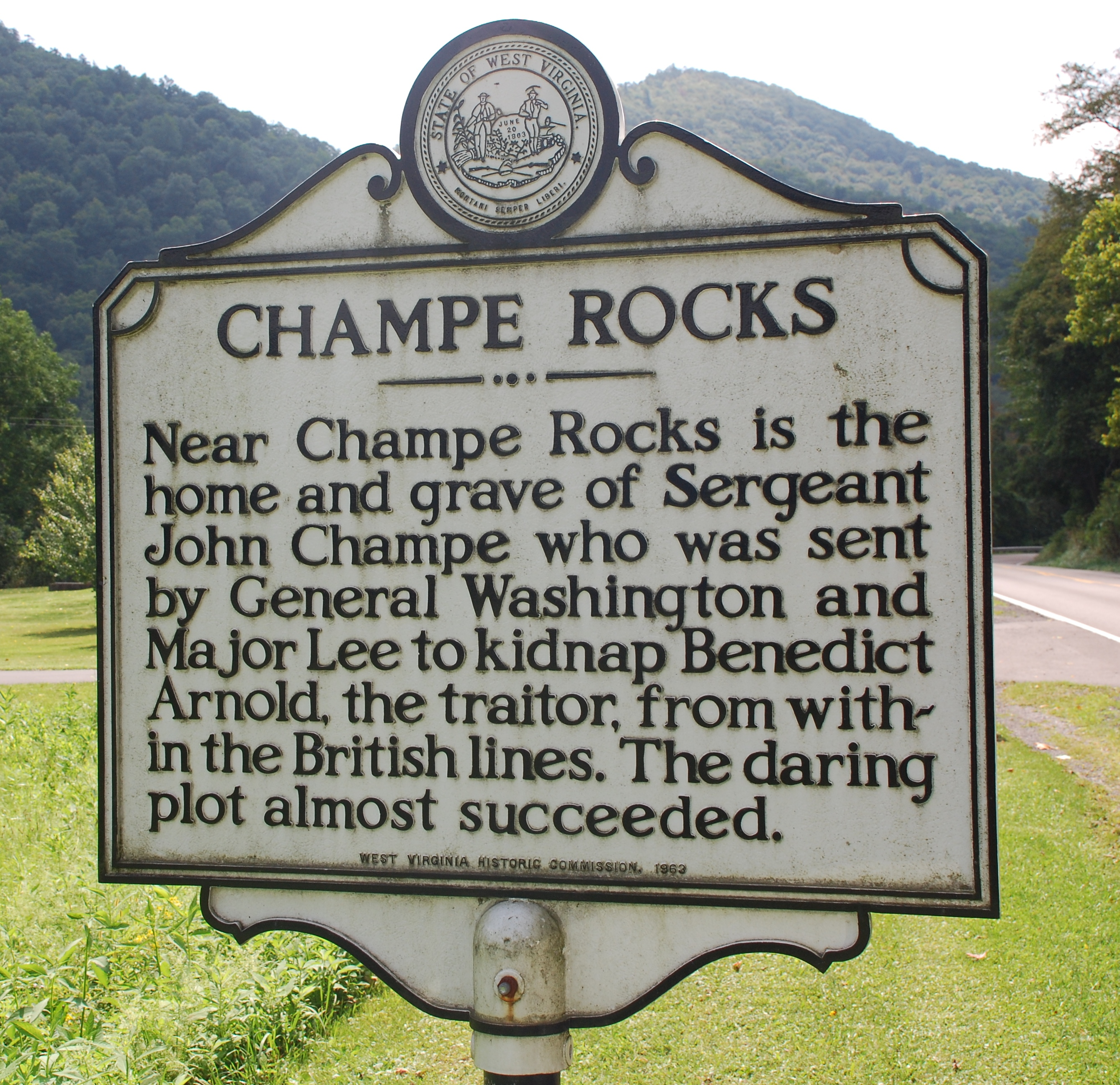
Champe Rocks marker

Champe Rocks are named for Sergeant Major John Champe (1752–1798), a Revolutionary War soldier who became a double agent in an attempt to capture the American traitor General Benedict Arnold. Commanded by Major Henry "Light-Horse Harry" Lee and handpicked by George Washington for the mission, Champe "defected" to the British side and came very close to succeeding, but at the last moment, Arnold changed plans and the whole endeavor had to be called off. Champe, who was born in Loudoun County, Virginia, settled near the Rocks after the War.

== Access ==
Although Champe Rocks lie within Spruce Knob–Seneca Rocks National Recreation Area and are clearly visible from West Virginia Route 28, there is no direct access to the formation from the public road without trespassing through private property. The Rocks are therefore only rarely climbed.
