= Cherry Grove, West Virginia =

Unincorporated community in West Virginia, United States

Cherry Grove
- Unincorporated community
- Location within the state of West Virginia Cherry Grove (the United States)
- Coordinates: 38°38′26″N 79°31′22″W
- Country: United States
- State: West Virginia
- County: Pendleton
- Time zone: UTC-5 (Eastern (EST))
  - Summer (DST): UTC-4 (EDT)
- GNIS feature ID: 1550682

Cherry Grove is an unincorporated community located in Pendleton County, West Virginia, United States. Cherry Grove lies within the Monongahela National Forest at the confluence of Big Run with the North Fork South Branch Potomac River.

According to the Geographic Names Information System, Cherry Grove has also been known throughout its history as Big Run, Big Run School, Champe Rocks, Mullenax, Mullenun, and Mullenux. The present name is derived from the local Cherry Grove school.

Champe Rocks are located some 20 miles north of Cherry Grove and would not have been an alternate name.

== Notable people ==
- Cherry Grove was the birthplace and hometown of Clinton M. Hedrick, who received the Medal of Honor for actions while serving with the U.S. Army's 17th Airborne Division during World War II.
- Anthony Johnson Showalter, American gospel music composer, teacher and publisher
