= Judy Gap, West Virginia =

- Unincorporated community
- Location within West Virginia Location within the United States
- Coordinates: 38°42′24″N 79°27′52″W
- Country: United States
- State: West Virginia
- County: Pendleton
- Elevation: 1,929 ft (588 m)
- Time zone: UTC-5 (Eastern (EST))
  - Summer (DST): UTC-4 (EDT)
- Area codes: 304 & 681
- GNIS feature ID: 1551614

Judy Gap is an unincorporated community in Pendleton County, West Virginia, United States. Judy Gap is located at the junction of U.S. Route 33 and West Virginia Route 28, 8.5 miles (13.7 km) west-northwest of Franklin, just west of the mountain gap also called Judy Gap. The Judy Rocks geological formation is just to the south. North Fork Mountain is to the east, and the North Fork of the South Branch of the Potomac River is to the west, with Spruce Mountain and Spruce Knob beyond the river. Most of the surrounding land is within the Monongahela National Forest.

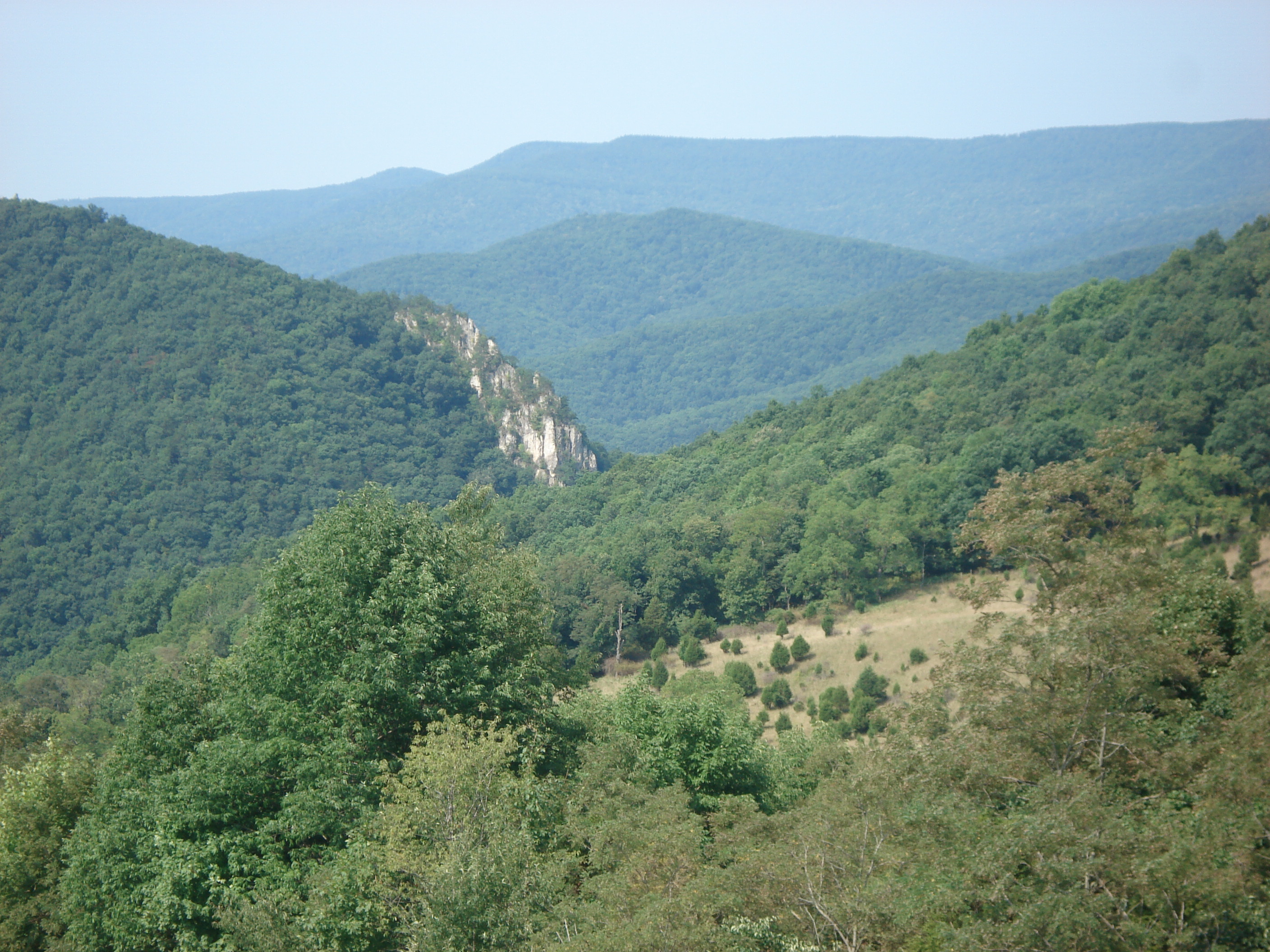
Landscape near the community of Judy Gap: Judy Gap (center), with Judy Rocks beyond the gap. Spruce Mountain is in the background; its highest point is Spruce Knob.
