= Riverton, West Virginia =

Riverton
- Unincorporated community
- Location within the state of West Virginia Riverton (the United States)
- Coordinates: 38°44′38″N 79°26′9″W
- Country: United States
- State: West Virginia
- County: Pendleton
- Time zone: UTC-5 (Eastern (EST))
  - Summer (DST): UTC-4 (EDT)
- ZIP code: 26814
- Area codes: 304 and 681
- GNIS feature ID: 1555491

Riverton is an unincorporated community on the North Fork South Branch Potomac River in Pendleton County, West Virginia, United States. Riverton lies along U.S. Highway 33/West Virginia Route 28 in the Monongahela National Forest.

== Climate ==
This climatic region is typified by large seasonal temperature differences, with warm to hot (and often humid) summers and cold (sometimes severely cold) winters. According to the Köppen Climate Classification system, Riverton has a humid continental climate, abbreviated "Dfb" on climate maps.
