= Smoke Hole =

Smoke Hole may refer to:

- Smoke hole, a hole in a roof for the smoke from a fire to vent
- Smoke Hole Canyon, or Smoke Hole, a gorge in the Allegheny Mountains of West Virginia, U.S.
  - Smoke Hole, West Virginia, a former unincorporated community
  - Smoke Hole Caverns, a picturesque show cave

== See also ==
- Smokey Hole Cave, in Manchester, Jamaica
