= Helmick =

Helmick is a surname. Notable people with the surname include:

- Dean Helmick, American politician
- Debra May Helmick, girl murdered by Larry Gene Bell
- Frank Helmick (born 1953), Lieutenant General in the United States Army
- Jeffrey J. Helmick (born 1960), United States District Judge for the Northern District of Ohio
- Paul Helmick, American film director who directed Thunder in Carolina
- Robert Helmick (1937–2003), American sports executive
- Walt Helmick (1944–2025), member of the West Virginia Senate
- William Helmick (1817–1888), U.S. Representative from Ohio

== See also ==
- James Helmick Beatty (1836–1927), judge from Idaho
- Sarah Helmick State Recreation Site, a state park in Polk County, Oregon
- Helmick, Ohio, an unincorporated community
- Helmick (Steamer), a steamer seized at Cairo, Illinois on April 27, 1861 while loaded with powder and war munitions destined for the Confederacy.
