= Smoke Hole, West Virginia =

Coordinates: 38°51′26″N 79°17′00″W

Smoke Hole
- Unincorporated community
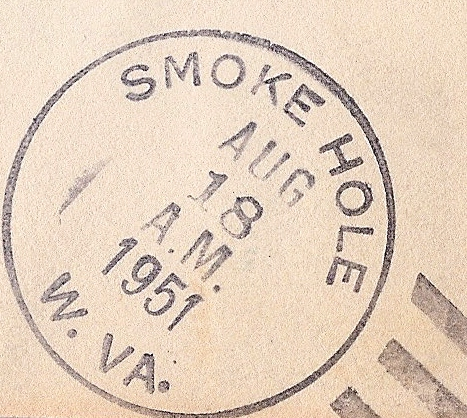
- Postmark from Smoke Hole, West Virginia
- Interactive map of Smoke Hole
- Country: United States
- State: West Virginia
- County: Pendleton
- Time zone: Eastern (EST)
- FIPS code: 1547011

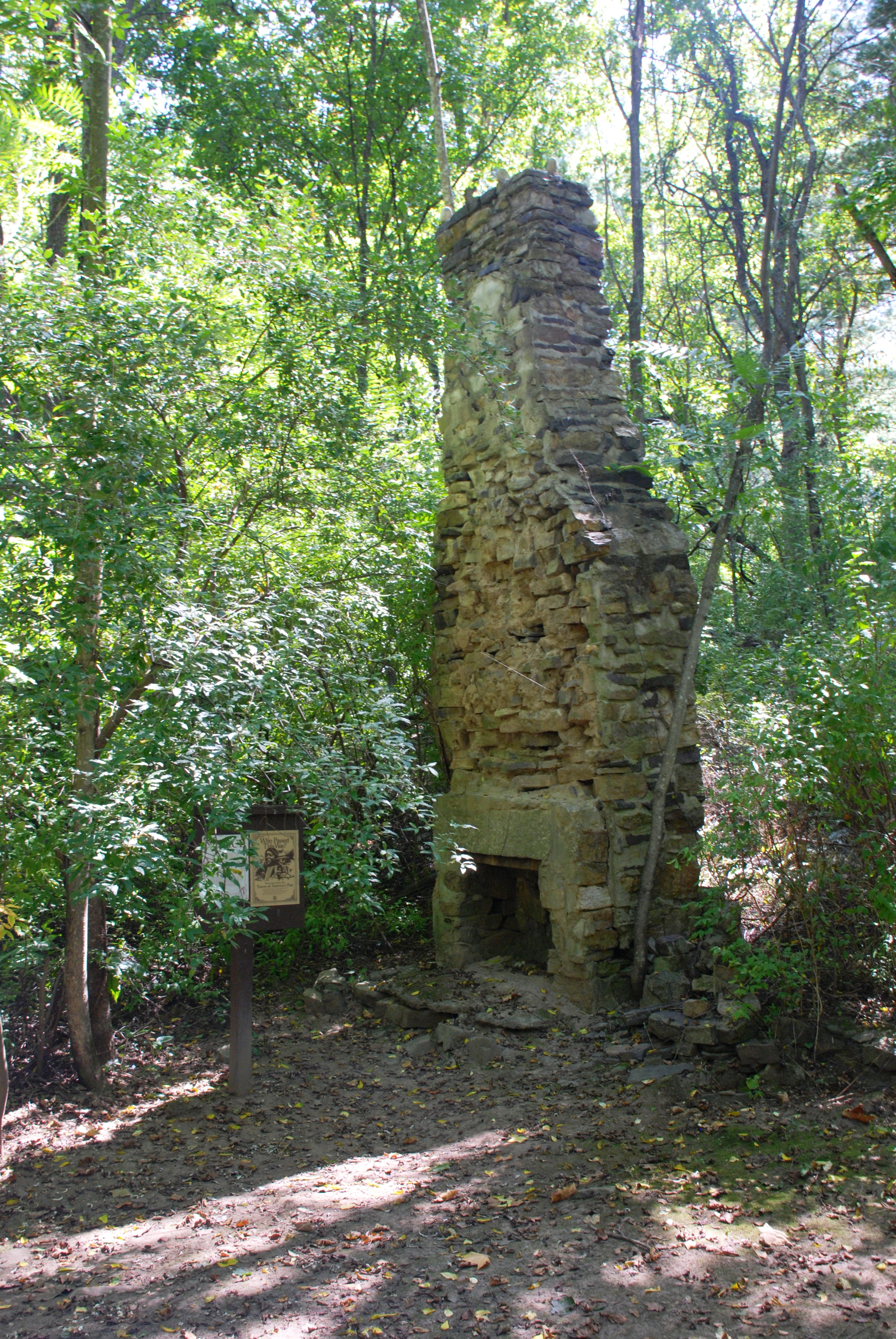
Smoke Hole's post office today

Smoke Hole was an unincorporated community located in Pendleton County, West Virginia, USA. It was in Smoke Hole Canyon and has since ceased to exist.
