= Smoke Hole Canyon =

Gorge in the United States

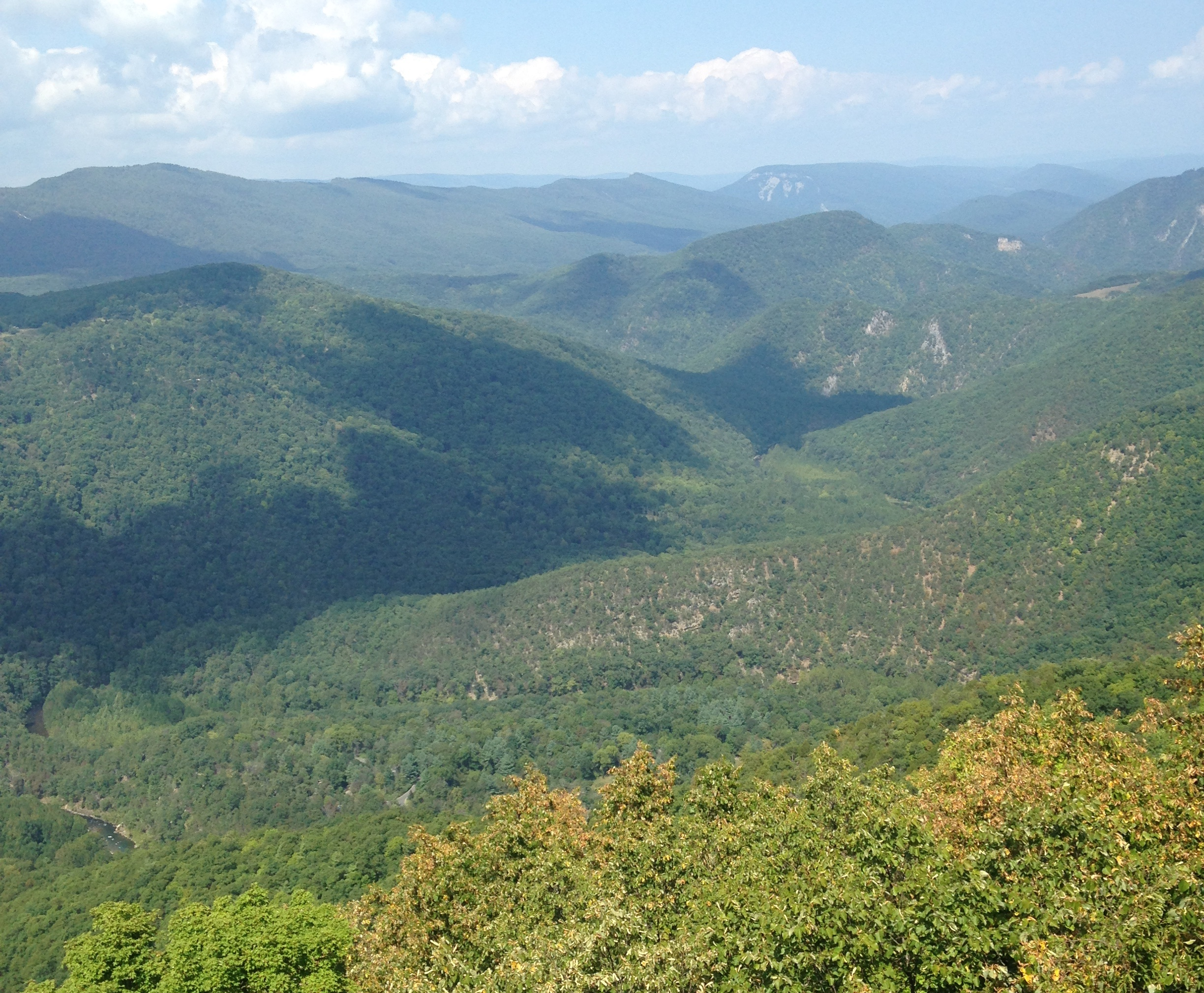
- View of Smoke Hole Canyon from atop Cave Mountain. Visible are the South Branch Potomac River and the Big Bend (bottom), as well as Castle Rock and North Fork Gap (distance).

- Location within West Virginia
- Floor elevation: 1,100 feet (300 m)
- Length: 20.7 miles (33.3 km)

Geography
- Location: Grant and Pendleton Counties, West Virginia, United States
- Coordinates: 38°51′35″N 79°17′04″W
- Rivers: South Branch Potomac River
- Interactive map of Smoke Hole Canyon

Smoke Hole Canyon — traditionally called The Smoke Holes and later simply Smoke Hole — is a rugged 20 miles (32 km) long gorge carved by the South Branch Potomac River in the Allegheny Mountains of eastern West Virginia, United States. The area is rather isolated and remote with parts accessible only by boat or on foot.

Defined to the east by Cave Mountain and to the west by North Fork Mountain, Smoke Hole has been part of the Monongahela National Forest's Spruce Knob–Seneca Rocks National Recreation Area since 1965, although some of it is still private land. Formerly, the area was home to a scattered community of family homesteads, storied for their isolation, traditional lifestyles, and skilled production of the illicit liquor known as "moonshine". Today, The Nature Conservancy considers Smoke Hole and the surrounding mountains to be "one of the most biologically rich places in the East", especially as regards its rare plant communities. It included the Canyon as part of the greater Smoke Hole-North Mountain Bioreserve during its "Last Great Places" campaign.

== Geography and description ==
Smoke Hole is situated in southern Grant and northern Pendleton Counties. It is defined by North Fork Mountain to the west and Cave Mountain to the east. At places the Canyon is over 1,000 feet (300 m) deep with nearly vertical walls. (The riverbed is at about 1,100 feet (340 m) above sea level and the summit of Cave Mountain is 2,470 feet (750 m).) Views of the Canyon can be had along the 24-mile (39 km) long North Fork Mountain Trail to the west where sods and cedar barrens can be visited. Caves are common in the Canyon slopes. Some are home to the endangered Virginia big-eared bat and are therefore closed to visitors during critical nesting or hibernation periods.

The main — and traditional — entrance into the Smoke Hole is from the south through a water gap between Big Mountain and Cave Mountain about two miles north of the community of Upper Tract. (This is about 1.5 miles along Pendleton County Route 2 beyond the bridge where US Route 220 crosses the South Branch.) The name of this "gateway" to the Canyon is Cave Mountain Gap and it represents a half mile cut through the high ridge separating the ancient riverbed of the South Branch Potomac River (to the east) from the ancient bed of Briggs Run (to the west).

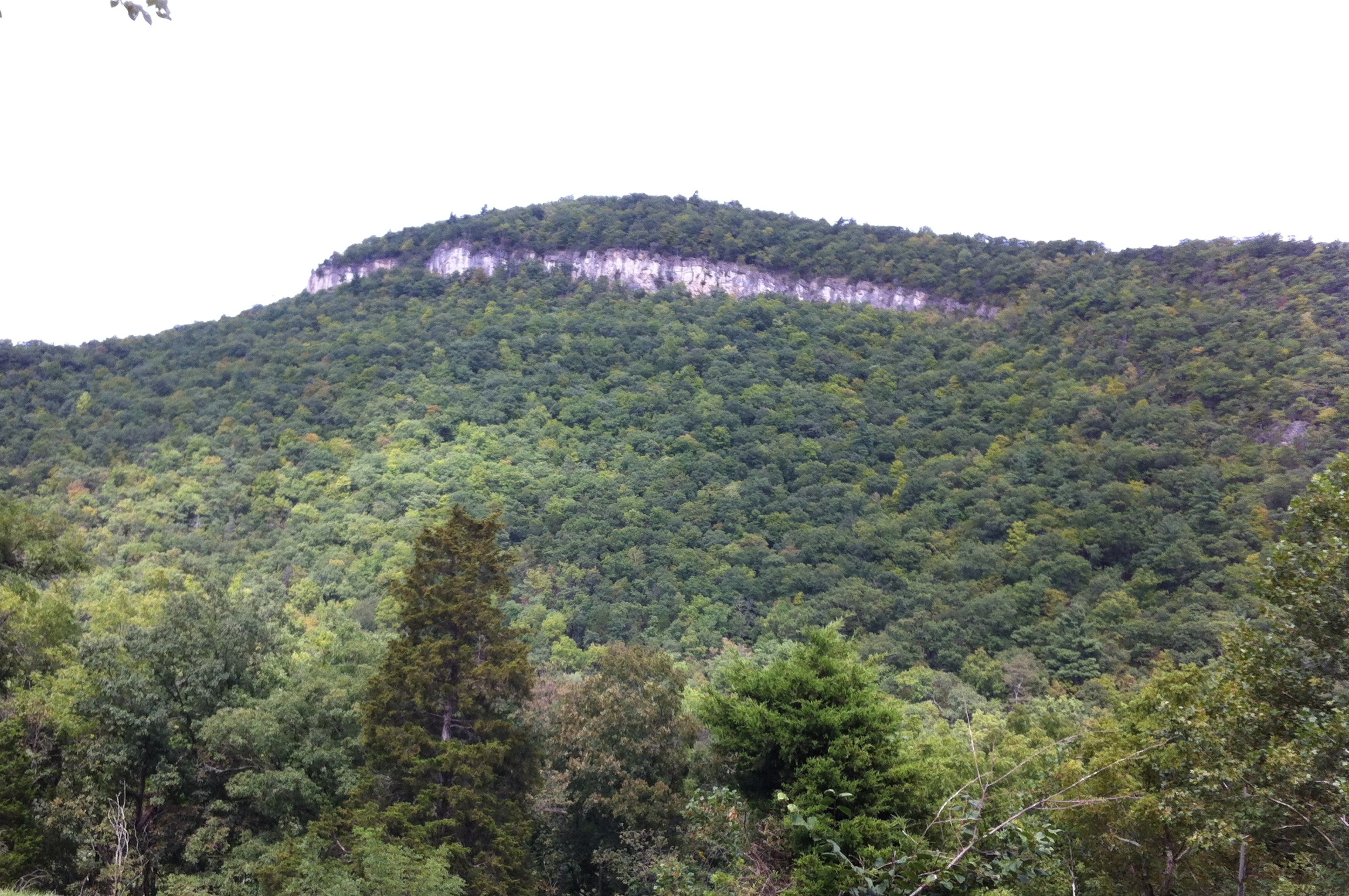
The Cave Mountain Anticline exposed as a cliff-face in Cave Mountain Gap

Eons ago — through a process known as "river piracy" or stream capture — the flow of the river was diverted cataclysmically from its old bed westward into what would eventually become the present Smoke Hole gorge through massive excavation and erosion. This likely developed through an intermediate stage during which the South Branch (or its precursor stream here, the lower Briggs Run) traversed the future Smoke Hole region underground. The roof of the vast subterranean channel then collapsed forming the karst topography seen today. Before the river exits the gap it passes through a narrow channel with ferocious rapids locally known as the "Rock Break". Nearby is Big Spring, source of the water supply for Upper Tract, which discharges 1,040 gallons per minute. (The spring issues from the base of Cave Mountain and is situated about 1,000 feet directly downhill of Cave Mountain Cave [formerly, "Big Cave"]. Many explorers have tried to find connections between the dry cave — which has had over two miles of passages mapped as of 2001 — and the spring, but so far without success. It was here, at cave and spring, that Confederates operated a salt petre works during the Civil War.) High above the river, on the north side of the gap, is a prominent range of limestone cliffs which represent the Cave Mountain Anticline. Here also, at river level, is a very prominent crag — Eagle Rock. A bit further on, Cat Path Rocks, a perpendicular cliff, has been partially cut through by the roadbed and is followed by another outcropping known as High Rocks.

About two miles downstream of the entrance, the river bifurcates to create the low-lying Hermit Island (4.5 acres), formerly a popular picnicking ground and site of a two-storey log cabin that served as a community center ("Calhoun's Community Camp") from 1928. Almost directly across the river, and high on the hillside, is the Canyon's namesake, Smoke Hole Cave. Passing on down the river, one encounters Fishing Rock and Fishing Rock Ford and finally comes, at 3.8 miles from the entrance, to an intersection near Shreve's Country Store, Smoke Hole Campground and the old Palestine Church ("Old Log Church"). This area was the center of the "town of Smoke Hole" proper, site of an official post office for a time. From here a steep Forest Service road switchbacks 5.4 miles up to the former site of the North Fork Mountain Lookout Tower. Grant County Route 28/11 also proceeds from this intersection and traverses the northern half of the Canyon well above the river level for about 12 miles (19 km) where it exits the Canyon at WV Route 55/28. (NB: Both Grant County Route 28/11 and Pendleton County Route 2 are indicated on maps as "Smoke Hole Road". The former was previously called FR 74.)

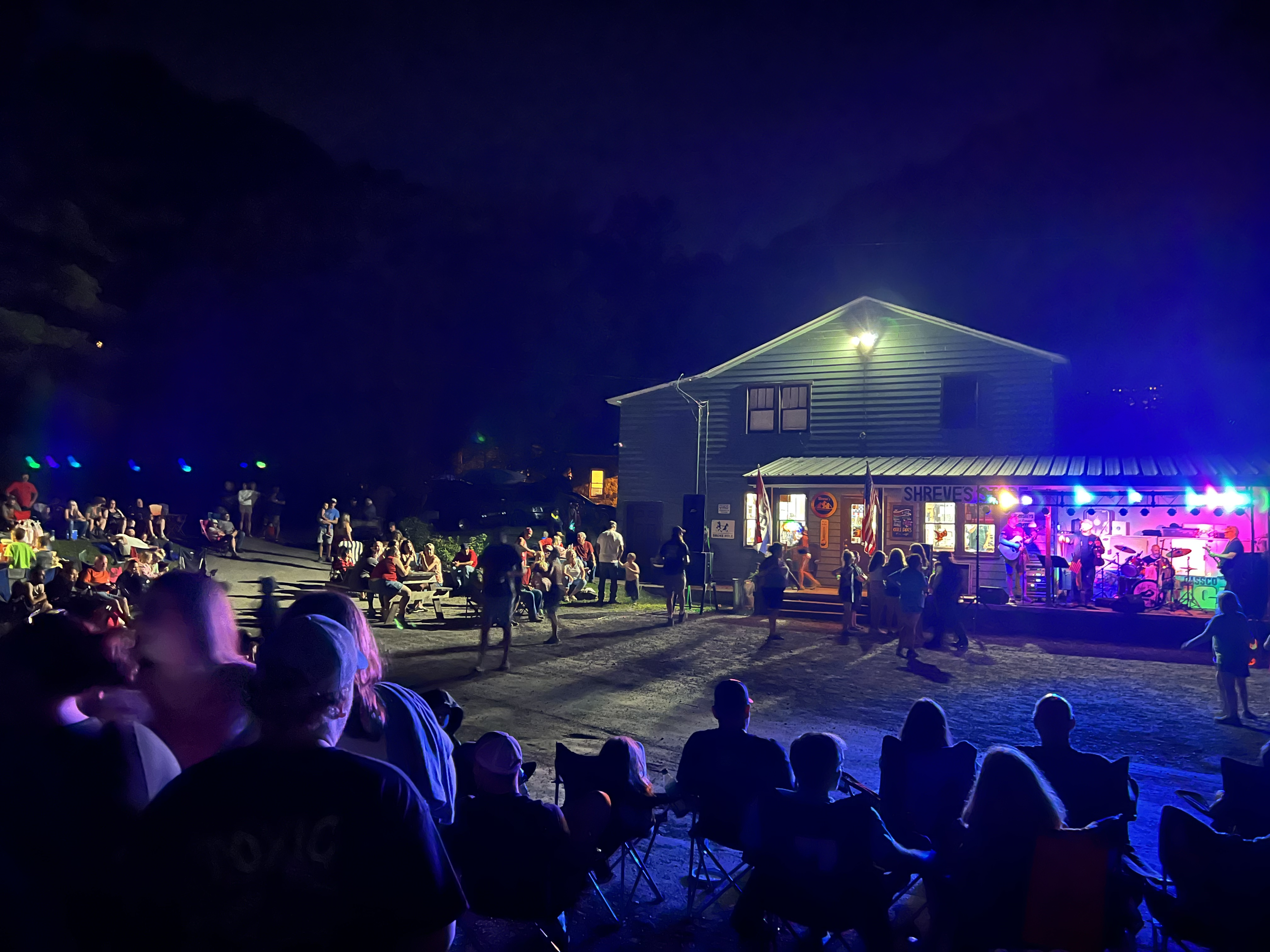
Live bluegrass music and dancing at Shreves Country Store

From the Shreve's Country Store intersection, CR 2 continues north another two miles along the river (past Old Mines Cave Rocks, mile 4.1 and Old Mines Cave, mile 5.8) to the abandoned town of Ketterman (mile 6.3) — also site of an erstwhile post office — and then a final mile to Big Bend Campground (mile 7.3) where the motorable roadway ends. Big Bend constitutes an unusual "peninsula" in the river; the river here loops for about 1.3 miles back to a point just 350 feet from itself. (The narrow ridge between the riverbanks here was traditionally known as "Arm Ridge".)

The South Branch collects a number of minor streams in the Canyon; these include Briggs Run (0.6 mile from the entrance), Dry Hollow Run (mile 1.0), Chevaux-de-fris Run (mile 3.8, at the road intersection), Short (Pack Saddle) Run (mile 5.5), Long (Feather Bed) Run (mile 5.8), and — beyond the Big Bend — Redman Run (mile 13.3) and Landes Hollow Run (mile 16.6). Beyond the Big Bend, the Canyon has the character of a remote wilderness; it is one of the most isolated regions of the state and can be traversed only on foot or by boat. Formerly, a primitive wagon road threaded its way through the lower Canyon, but most traces of this are long gone. Prominent named crags and caves along this section include Indian House Cave (mile 10.1), Castle Rock (mile 11.3), Blue Rock (mile 16.2), and Bulls Head (mile 16.6), just below which is Peacock Cave (mile 16.6). About 3 miles on (mile 20.7), the river debouches from the Canyon. After another half mile, the South Branch collects the North Fork South Branch just below Cabins.

== History ==
=== Early settlers ===
The first Smoke Hole settlers followed quickly on the heels of the first in the South Branch valley, which arrived in the late 1740s. A man named Steele (given name now lost) was the first Smoke Holer, arriving sometime in the 1750s. He built a cabin near the (still standing) Palestine Church and his daughter Katie married another pioneer, George Full — the first wedding celebrated in the Canyon. Another young Steele daughter, Susie, out alone searching for a family cow, fell victim to a wandering band of Native Americans. Her father found her scalped, she died soon after, and he buried her nearby on a small promontory still known as "Susie Hill". George Full built his home and a grist mill in the same vicinity. The parents of Revolutionary War veteran William Eagle (1761–1848) arrived shortly afterward. (Eagle returned after the war and is buried near the 300-foot-high crag that bears his name.) Another Revolutionary War veteran settled there in the years after the conflict, but he — Charles Bleachynden — had been one of the enemy: he was one of the Hessian soldiers (German mercenaries) surrendered at Yorktown in 1781 with Lord Cornwallis' forces.

The earliest settler families — the Steeles, Fulls, Eagles, Coxes, Boars, Shreves, and Van Meters — were sustained by smallholder farming, supplemented by hunting and fishing. (In those days, available game included bison, elk and puma.) Livestock, especially swine and sheep, were typically free-ranging and huckleberries and chestnuts were harvested from the wooded mountainsides in quantity. Maple sugar, maple syrup and wild honey were all available with a minimum of effort. Fruit orchards were also harvested, but — owing to the inaccessibility of the community — only very infrequently was local produce brought to market at nearby Petersburg or Franklin. This situation continued to prevail for several generations.

The origin of the name "Smoke Hole" is undocumented. Some old timers used to refer to the area as the "Smoke Holes". The oldest explanation appears to be the story that Native Americans used a well-known cave in the gorge (Smoke Hole Cave) for smoking meat; this cave has a room shaped like an inverted funnel with a hole at the apex through which smoke could escape and be seen from some distance. But it has also been suggested that a misty fog often lies along the river and ascends, thus evoking a "smoky hole", and that this is possibly the origin. A third popular story is that the fires of moonshiner's stills during prohibition days (and before) gave the gorge its name. Longtime residents of the gorge have insisted that the Indian "smoke house" cave story is the only genuine one and the only explanation that pre-dates the ones on the local state historical highway markers.

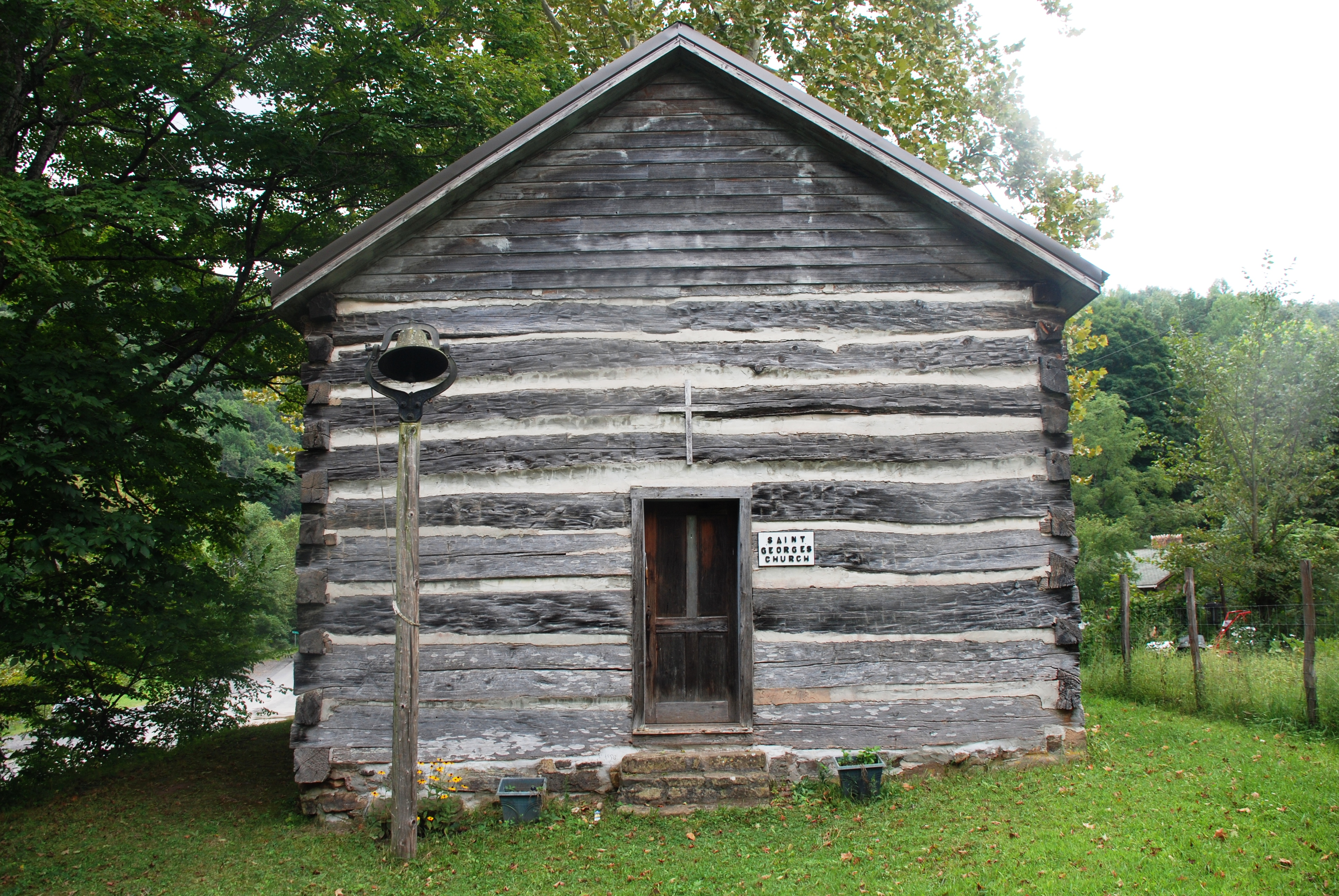
Palestine (St. George's) Church (built c. 1850)

=== The 19th century ===
The earliest settler families were followed, a generation or two later, by a second wave — the Kimbles, Alts, Stumps, Judys, Helmicks, and Kettermans.

A still extant log church — Palestine Church — was built as a Methodist Episcopal meeting house around 1850.

The nearby cavern known as "Big Cave", on Cave Mountain, was a source of saltpeter for the production of gunpowder from the earliest settlements through the War of 1812. This cave (not to be confused with the commercially developed Smoke Hole Caverns, just outside the Canyon, or with Smoke Hole Cave in the Canyon itself) is now better known as Cave Mountain Cave. Confederates again mined there during the American Civil War. This work was undertaken by the 46th Regiment Militia, a Virginia State Unit based in Pendleton County, but Smoke Holers too old or too young to be drafted were coerced into doing the hard labor. Union-supporting Home Guards — known locally as "Swamp Dragons" — destroyed the works. The Smoke Hole settlers were not generally slaveholders and became overwhelmingly Unionist during the War. With most local men of military age away for the duration of the War, the depredations of local Confederate partisans — known as the "Rebel Raiders" — included a number of ambushes and killings. This created a bitter legacy. One result of this was that the Smoke Holers, previously staunch Democrats (along with most antebellum Virginians), became inveterate Republicans afterward.

=== Early 20th-century life ===
Descriptions of conditions prevailing in the Smoke Hole during the early 20th century were highlighted by wild tales of inaccessibility and the outmoded pioneer lifestyles of the inhabitants. Many stories centered on the production of the illicit homemade liquor known as "moonshine". The more gullible travellers believed that Smoke Holers were so uncivilized and violent that it was dangerous to go there and that "revenuers" (federal law officers) frequently disappeared in the Canyon. In the 1920s, sympathetic Franklin attorney H. M. Calhoun Sr. (1866–1933) became a public champion of the Smoke Hole and its people.

High quality moonshine, however, was a booming cottage industry for Smoke Holers in the 1920s and early '30s. It was made for local consumption as well as distributed (on the black market) for hundreds of miles around. Production on a small scale had been a local tradition long before the institution of Prohibition (1919) and continued to be so long after its repeal (1933). The "revenuers" destroyed many "stills" (distilleries) during this period and sent many moonshiners to the state penitentiary — the typical term of incarceration was one year. (Not uncommonly, an offender would serve his term, be released, and promptly resume production.) Local constables sometimes cooperated with the "revenuers" in busting up the stills, but at other times were themselves participants in moonshine production and distribution. Despite the wild stories, there is no evidence that any "revenuer" was ever assaulted or "disappeared" in the Smoke Hole.

The Monongahela National Forest (MNF) extended its boundaries in 1927 to include the Smoke Hole and in 1930 the first improved (graded) road was extended into the southern half of the gorge. The Civilian Conservation Corps stationed a battalion in Smoke Hole between 1934 and 1936 and constructed a popular recreation area there. In the latter year, their encampment was washed away in a river flood. At this period, local grade school children could attend a long-established local, one-room schoolhouse, but those few who were ambitious enough to try and attend high school had to walk seven miles (each way) to catch a school bus.

A visitor in the late 1930s observed that:

Their speech is quaint, containing many archaic forms handed down from the first settlers of the eighteenth century. They use such plural forms as 'postes', 'beastes', 'nestes', 'ghostes', and analogous verb forms, 'costes' and 'twistes'. They employ 'clumb' for 'climbed', 'wrop' for 'wrapped', 'holp' for 'helped', and such redundancies as 'rifle-gun', 'rock-clift', 'ham-meat' and 'tooth-dentist'. Peculiarly free from modern slang, their vocabulary includes such a familiar term as 'budget' to signify a bag, wallet, or bundle. The Smoke Holer is most precise: 'Is that a bushel basket?' he is asked. 'No, I reckon not,' is the reply, 'but hit'll hold nigh onto a bushel.'

In 1940, the West Virginia Writers' Project provided a vivid description of life and politics in the Smoke Hole:

Notwithstanding the comparative isolation from daily events, the Smoke Hole resident takes a keen interest in governmental affairs and goes to some lengths to express his political convictions at the polls ... Along with occasional Saturday night jaunts to Petersburg or Franklin, one of his choicest entertainments consists of gathering in jeans-clad groups on Saturday and Sunday afternoons in Shreve's store, there to discuss crops, hunting, and politics. The political situation in the Smoke Hole is certainly unusual; until a few years ago it was said the Smoke Hole had "only one Democrat and lightnin' killed him", but recently there has been some swing of political allegiances. There are 113 registered voters in the Smoke Hole, and of these 81 are members of one of seven families, all early settlers, the Alts, Ayres, Judys, Kimbles, Selfs, Shreves, and Shirks, with the Kimble clan alone boasting 29 votes.

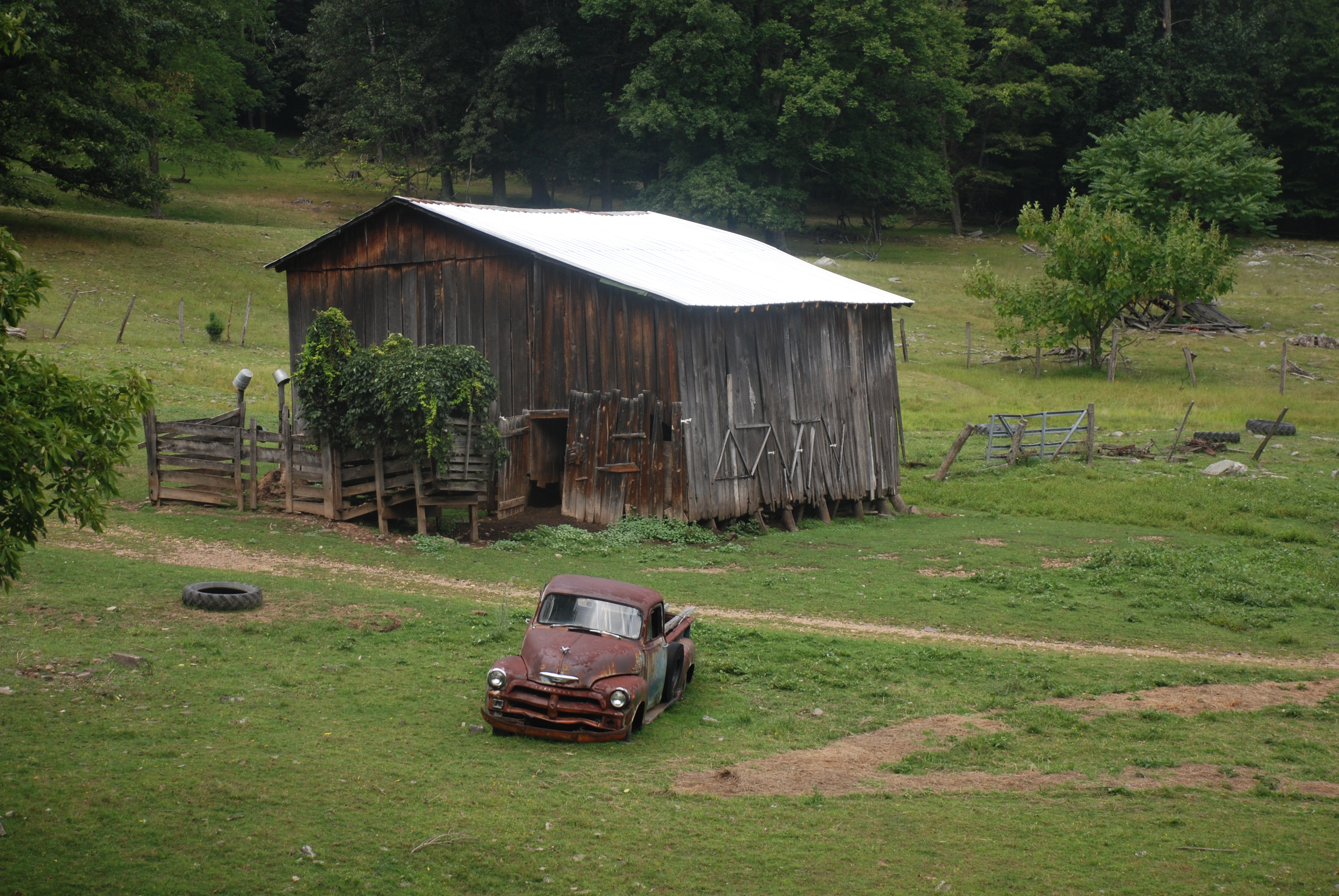
A barn and 1950s Chevrolet pickup truck off Smoke Hole Road in the Canyon

During the Great Depression, many of the few people then living in the Canyon left to find better jobs, and their homesteads were consolidated among a smaller number of landholders. By this time about 50 families resided in the Canyon — in 1941 there were 260 residents associated with the post office at Smoke Hole and another 49 around the one at Ketterman, three miles downstream — but World War II accelerated the out-migration and long-term population decline. The network of mountain roads formerly connecting homesteads and farms throughout the Canyon is now largely abandoned. Electric and gas service was provided to the few remaining residents only in 1949.

=== Preservation and recreation ===
In 1965, much of the Smoke Hole gorge was included in the MNF's new Spruce Knob–Seneca Rocks National Recreation Area. A remote hotel — the Smoke Hole Lodge — operated in the Canyon until severely damaged in a 1985 flood; a replacement business operated until 2001.

The Smoke Hole region has become a primary protection project of The Nature Conservancy, which purchased an 1,126-acre (456 ha) easement there in April 2004. Under the 2006 Monongahela National Forest Land and Resource Management Plan, over 3,000 acres (1,200 ha) in the Smoke Hole area were set aside for non-motorized, primitive recreation and remote wildlife habitat. The West Virginia Division of Forestry, in conjunction with The Nature Conservancy, acquired conservation easements to protect private woodlands near Smoke Hole in 2009.

On 10 November 2013, a fire started on private land adjacent to USFS land in the Smoke Hole. Over the next 12 days, more than 190 personnel were dedicated to fire suppression efforts. The fire grew through the first night, despite rapid response efforts by the Franklin, Seneca Rocks, and Upper Tract Volunteer Fire Departments, as well as crews from the USFS. Several crews, engines, and a helicopter worked to suppress the fire. Resources from 18 other states provided personnel and equipment. The major Smoke Hole Fire effort came under the unified command of the West Virginia Division of Forestry and the USFS. According to Peter Fischer, MNF Fire Management Officer, it was the largest wildfire in the Monongahela National Forest since the 1950s. As of 22 November 2013, the 1,611 acre Smoke Hole Fire had been fully contained.

The canyon offers excellent class II - III whitewater paddling for several months in the spring when the water levels are high enough.

== Geology ==
=== Exposed anticlinal-synclinal structures ===
The geology of the Smoke Holes is dominated by the Cave Mountain anticline. The stratigraphic column exposed in this region contains Lower Silurian to Middle Devonian sandstones, limestones, and shales. This package of rocks is bounded on the lower and upper ends by two fairly competent sandstones: the Silurian Tuscarora and the Devonian Oriskany (Ridgeley), respectively. The anticline trends N 34 degrees E, and is faulted along the southeast-dipping Cave Mountain thrust against the southeast limb of the Wills Mountain anticline (North Fork Mountain). The Cave Mountain anticline is asymmetric to the northwest with a slightly overturned northwest limb. Adjacent to this northwest limb is a highly folded and faulted zone that is representative of the designated Blue Rock synclinal "shear zone" complex of macroscale structures between the Cave Mountain and the Wills Mountain anticlines. Furthermore, the Cave Mountain anticline is a doubly plunging fold showing a culmination at the Lower Silurian strata level near Big Bend in the center of the Smoke Holes. The anticline appears to divide into several plunging folds upsection, at the Lower Devonian strata level, toward each end of the fold.

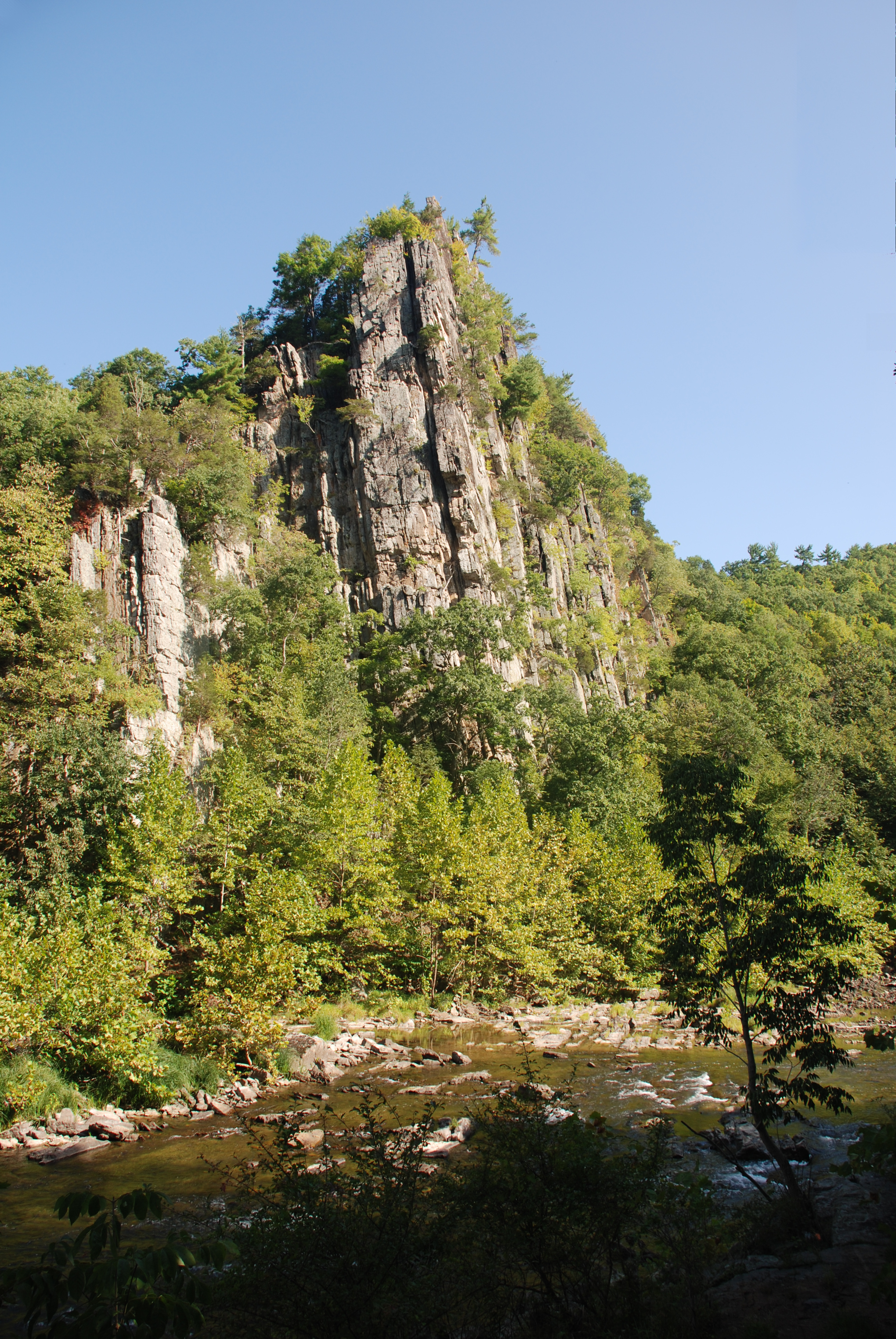
Eagle Rock

Particularly noticeable are the numerous plunging anticlinal noses at the northeastern end of the Smoke Holes.

The Cave Mountain anticline consists of subparallel northeast-trending folds and southeast-dipping thrust faults with a maximum stratigraphic displacement of approximately 1900 feet, throwing Lower Silurian rocks against Lower Devonian rocks. The Cave Mountain anticline is further structurally bounded to the northeast and southwest by major cross-strike structural discontinuities: the nearly east–west trending Petersburg lineament and an extension of the northwest–southeast trending Parsons lineament, respectively.

Overall, this region reveals the interior of this thrusted anticlinal-synclinal structure and presents a phenomenal exposure of complex central Appalachian macroscale structures involving the Silurian-Devonian package of rocks. Geologically, the Smoke Holes are the most uniquely exposed region within the westernmost central Appalachians and they have served as a surface model for complex subsurface structures shown and/or suspected by seismic and exploratory drilling. Furthermore, this region provides detailed insight into the lowermost roof-sequence cover above the suspected duplex of Cambrian-Ordovician horse-blocks and blind-thrusts at depth.

=== Caves and karst ===
A number of small shelter caves in the Canyon are developed in the Oriskany Sandstone. The larger and more significant limestone solutional caves, however, are mostly developed in limestones of the Helderberg Group (Lower Devonian), especially Corriganville Limestone and New Creek Limestone. A few caves in the lower gorge are developed in the Tonoloway Limestone (Silurian), as is Smoke Hole Caverns, just outside the Canyon's lower end. A notable Tonoloway Limestone "fin" is "Blue Rock" in the lower gorge. Smoke Hole caves include some that are historically significant for past saltpeter mining operations — Big Cave (now called Cave Mountain Cave) and Old Mines Cave — as well as Peacock Cave, Patricks Cave, Blue Rock Cave, Indian House Cave, and the namesake Smoke Hole Cave. Another dozen or so smaller caves have also been documented.

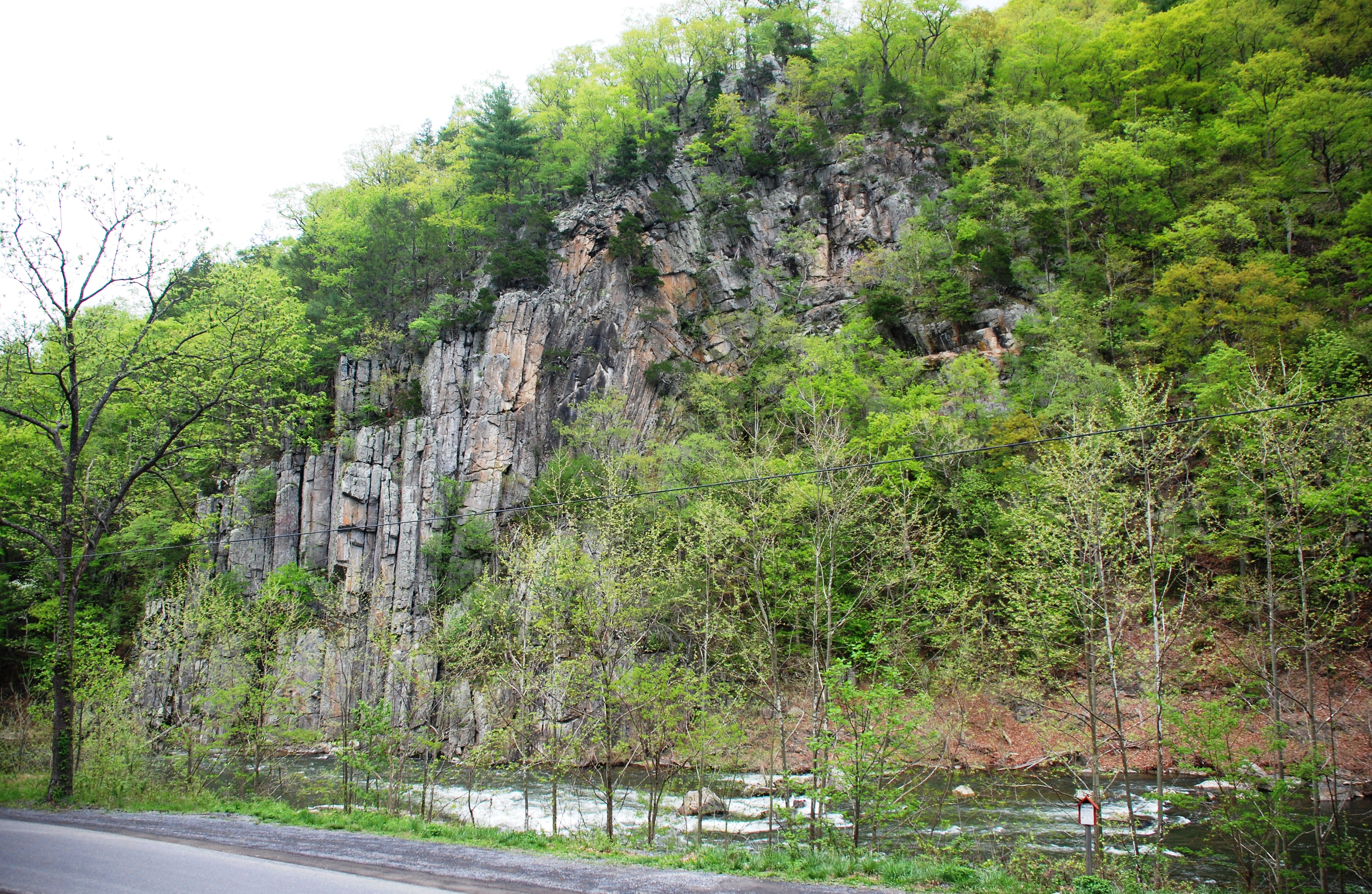
Unnamed cliff (part of the Alt Cabin Anticline) along Smoke Hole Road

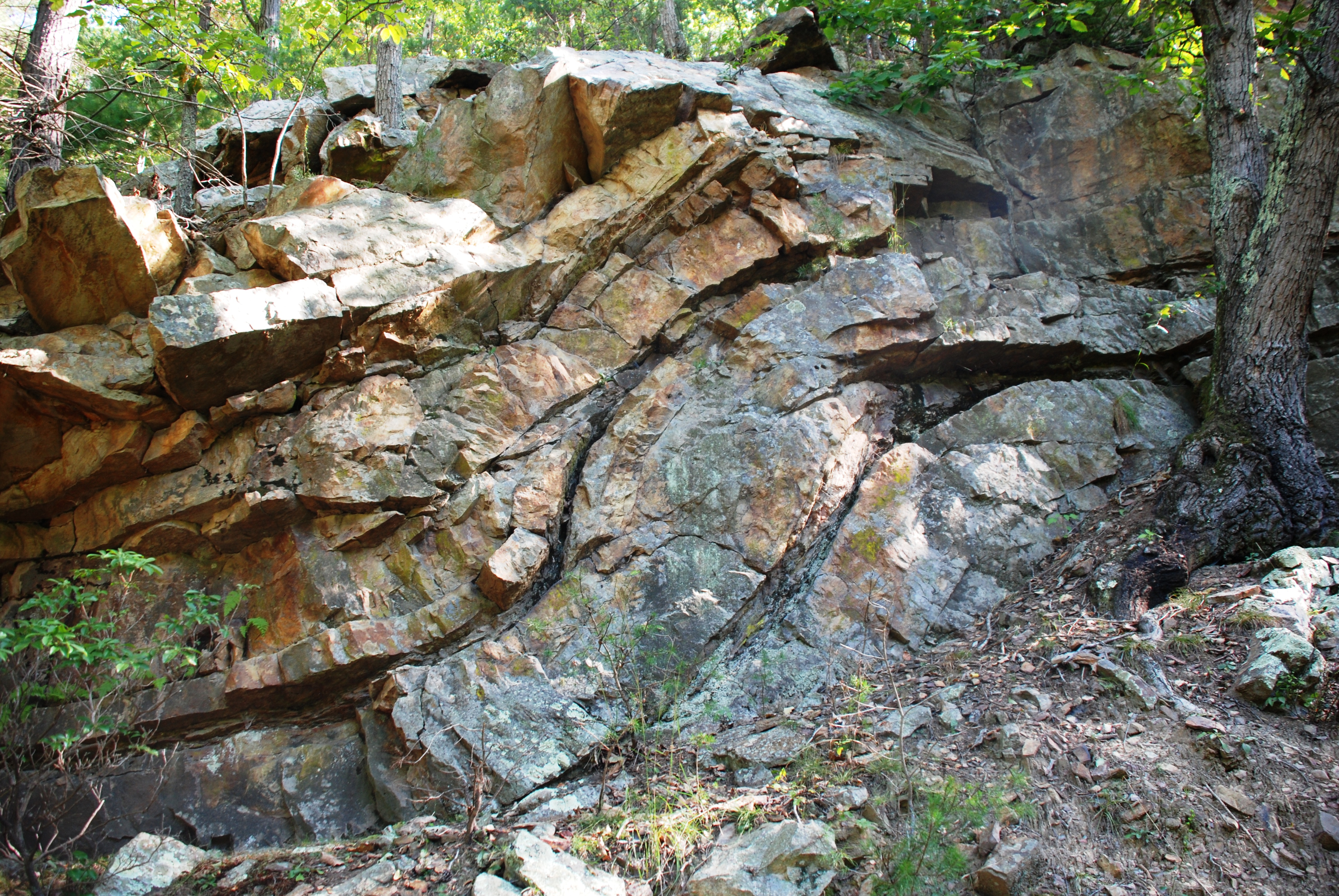
Exposed rock layers near Big Bend Campground

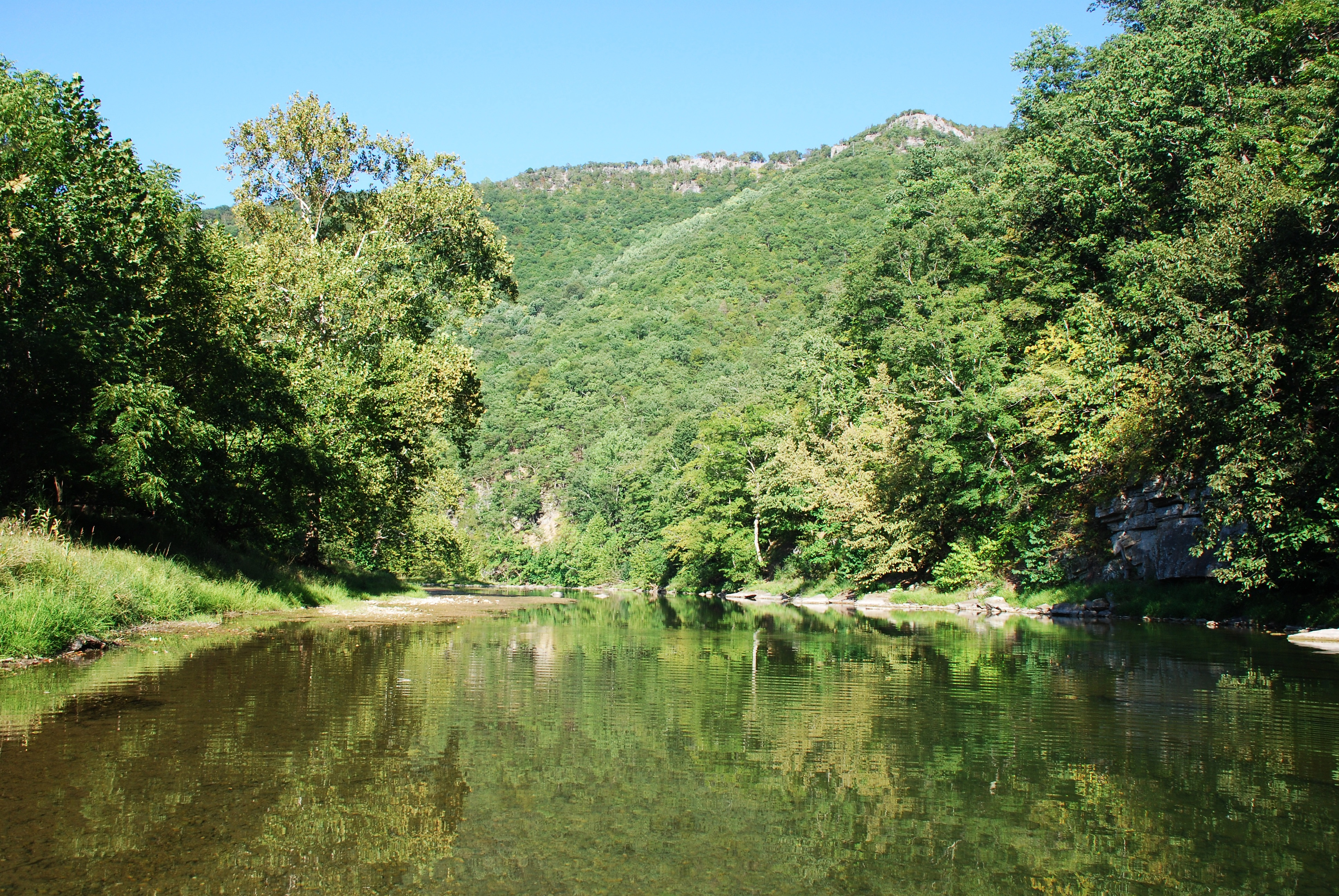
A view of the South Branch at Big Bend

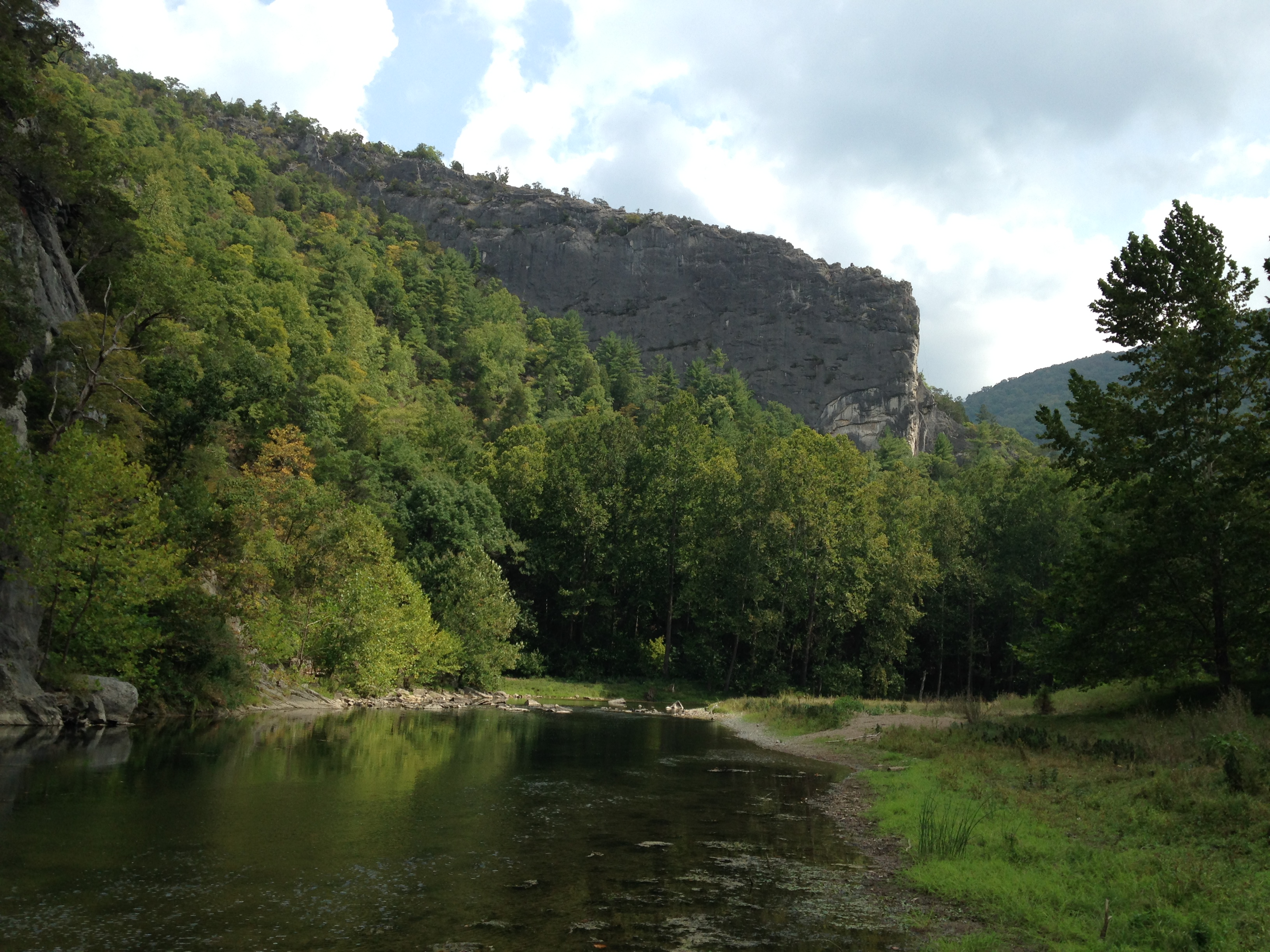
Blue Rock, composed of the Late Silurian Tonoloway Formation limestone, in the lower Smoke Hole Canyon

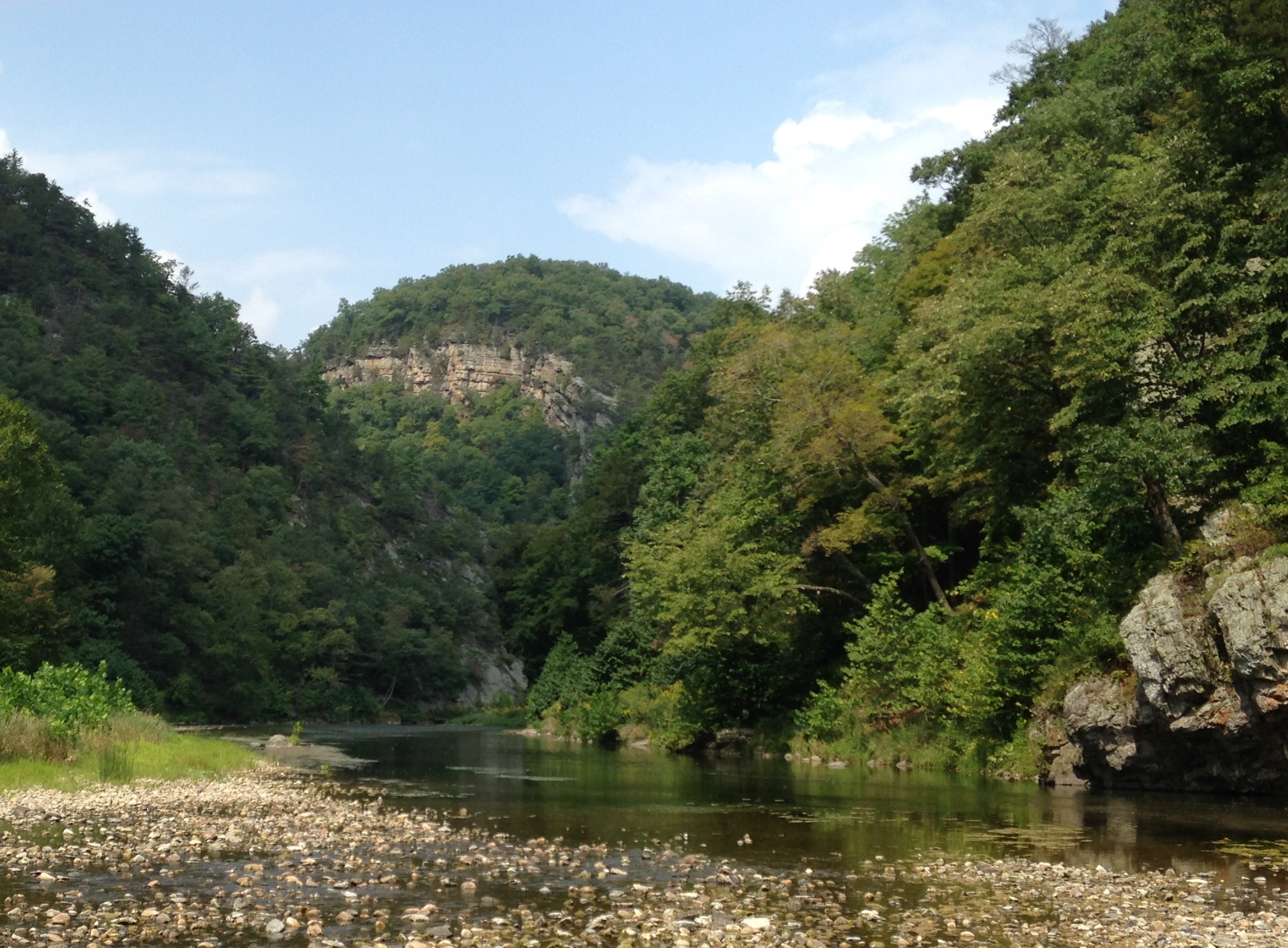
Redman Gap and the South Branch

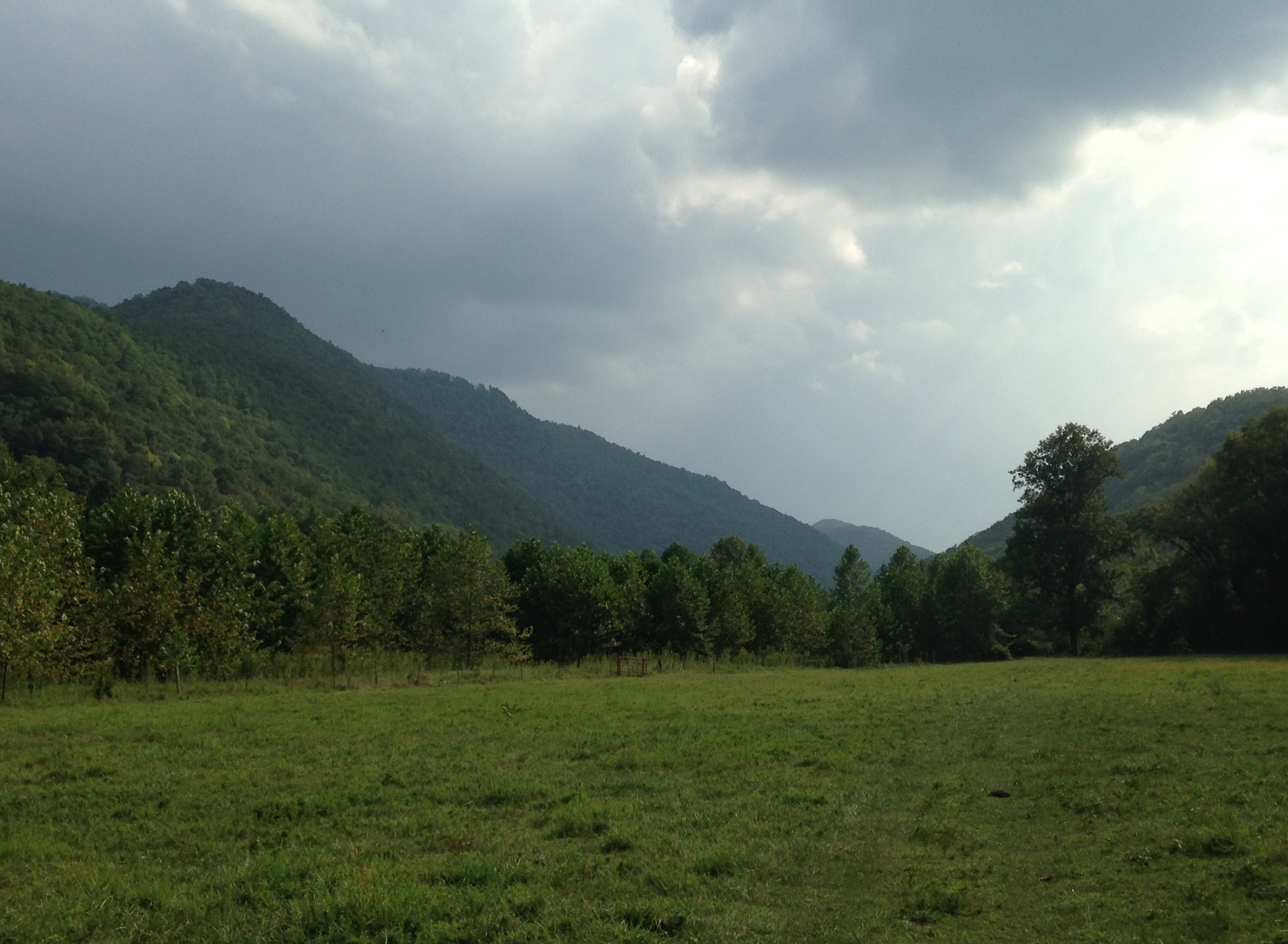
Bottomland in the lower Canyon (looking upstream)

== Ecology ==
Smoke Hole is a biologically diverse area classified as an upland limestone-based ecosystem. It is believed that the Canyon is the largest area of limestone forest left in this region of the country. Most of the forest soil in West Virginia is naturally acidic, only growing a certain range of plants. But limestone soil is not acidic and tends to be richer in certain nutrients than are other soils, thus supporting a different type of plant life. The plant species mix is unique: common Appalachian plants along with prairie species such as prairie rocket, Indian grass and little bluestem.

The dry, prairie-like areas along the upper knobs and ridges of the Canyon are home to a variety of typically western plants such as prairie flax. These plants are more commonly found west of the Mississippi River. Due to the protective effect of surrounding mountains, rainfall in Smoke Hole is unusually light — only about 30-32 inches per year. This relatively low precipitation permits a small haven for these unusual species.

About a dozen species of plants and animals in Smoke Hole Canyon are considered to be "globally rare".

=== Flora ===
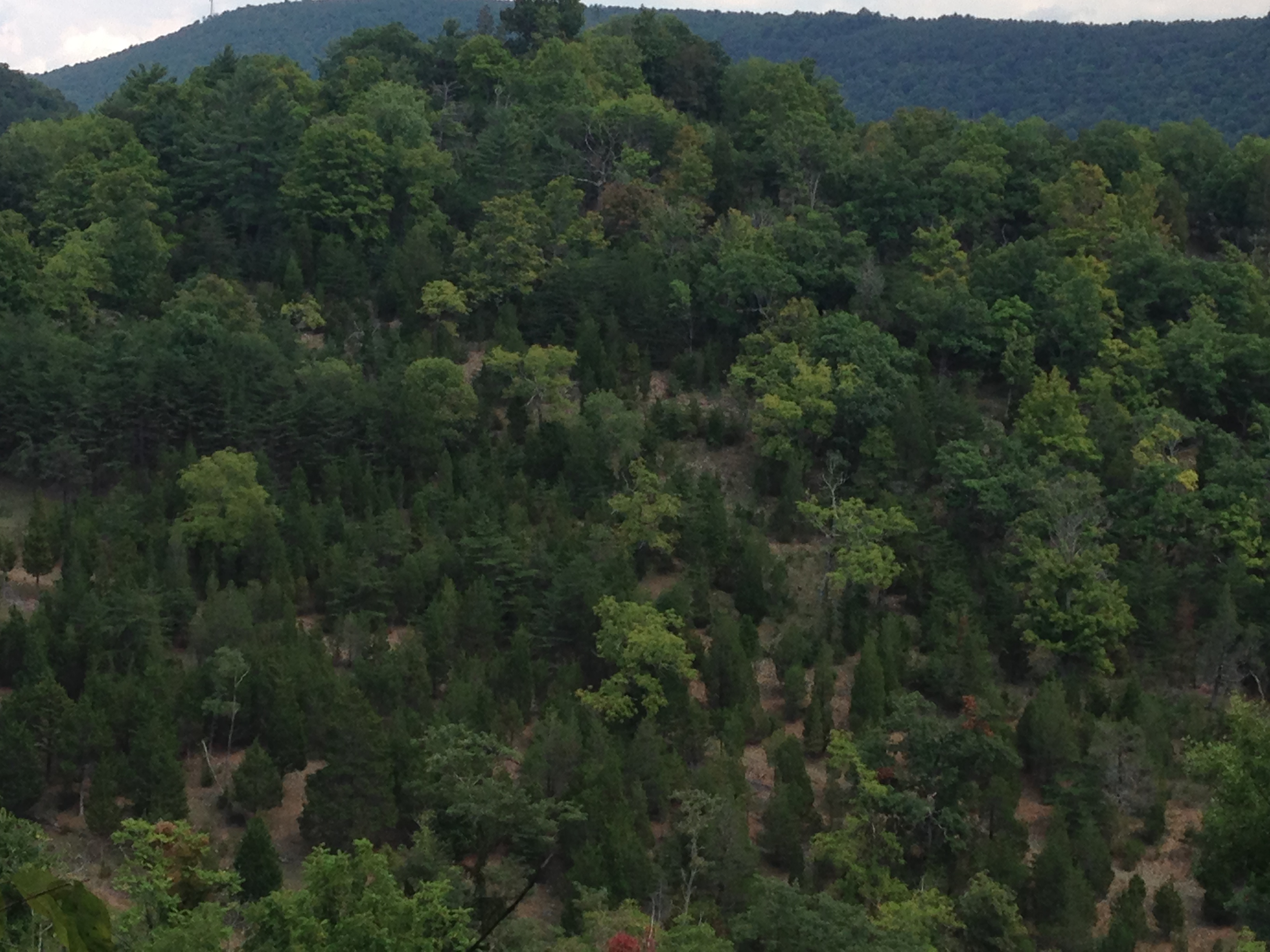
Area of cedar barrens on a spur of North Fork Mountain in Smoke Hole

Trees
The dominant trees covering the Canyon's wooded slopes are oak, black walnut, ash, mulberry and hickory; also abundant are ironwood, linden, flowering dogwood, eastern redcedar, birch, aspen, American beech, tulip poplar and six varieties of pine. The fruit-bearing common pawpaw (Asimina triloba) grows at river level in great profusion, especially in the lower gorge. Before the early-20th-century chestnut blight, the American chestnut was also common here.

Shrubs
The understory of the Canyon woodland includes such low-lying, fruit-bearing vegetation as huckleberry, blackberry, raspberry, teaberry, and wild grape. Other undergrowth includes crab-apple, witch hazel, rhododendron, sumac, pussy willow, spicewood, dog rose, sloe, chokecherry, haw, and honeysuckle.

Herbs and wild flowers
The biological richness of Smoke Hole's plant communities was demonstrated by a botanist in 1933 who documented 283 species of flora on the 4-acre Hermit Island alone. The earliest spring annuals to emerge in the Canyon are bloodroot, followed by the yellow dog-toothed violet. Spring beauties, bluets and dandelions are not far behind. Other violets along with the buttercups follow. Summer brings jack-in-the-pulpit, trilliums, anemones, wild geraniums, wild roses, lady slipper, wild columbine, rhododendron, black-eyed susans, field lilies, and ox-eyed daisies.

The prairie-like regions and associated cedar glades around the Smoke Hole Canyon are the largest groupings of such habitats in the Central Appalachians, and a number of unusual disjunct or regionally endemic plant species are known from the Smoke Hole. The Smoke Hole bergamot (Monarda fistulosa var. brevis), a member of the mint family, has some of its few worldwide occurrences within the Smoke Hole area. Virginia nailwort (Paronychia virginica var. virginica) is another rare plant known from the Smoke Hole. This species is so uncommon that the few small patches found among the rocks of the Canyon walls are thought to be the largest population in the world. The prairie flax (Linum lewisii) is a widespread western species quite rare in the east. Sometimes called "Lewis flax", it was originally discovered during the Lewis and Clark Expedition (1804–1806), and not known wild east of the Great Plains until it was found in the Smoke Hole.

=== Fauna ===
Mammals
The populations of bison, elk and cougar that attracted the earliest settlers to Smoke Hole have long since gone. White-tail deer were also exterminated from the area, as they were from the entire state, by about 1900. Thus, for the first four decades of the 20th century, young Smoke Holers only knew about these "exotic" animals from the nostalgic hunting stories of their fathers and grandfathers. (This changed in the early 1940s when deer were reintroduced into the Canyon; they have thrived there since.)

Today the Canyon still has significant black bear and bobcat populations and is known for its large number of timber rattlesnakes, a species now scarce elsewhere in the state. Smaller game animals include red and grey foxes, raccoons, opossums, beavers, mink, wild turkey, cottontails, squirrels, and quail. The coyote has returned in recent years. Smaller mammals include woodchucks, weasels, chipmunks, muskrat and field mice. The Allegheny woodrat, which lives in rocky terrain in the Canyon, has been declining throughout much of its range due to an epidemic of roundworm infestation (acquired from raccoons), among other causes. The Canyon is home to about 40 percent of the world's Virginia big-eared bat population and the largest single colony of Indiana bats, another endangered animal in the eastern US. The big-eared bat is highly sensitive and needs exacting conditions to hibernate. Its caves are therefore protected during critical months.

Birds
The Canyon is a prime area for neotropical migrant birds — i.e., those that spend their summers in the US but migrate to South America for the winter. Wood thrushes, scarlet tanagers and various warblers have all been in decline recently because of habitat loss on both continents, but can find sanctuary within the secluded Canyon. Bald eagles also nest in the surrounding mountainsides and great blue heron can be seen hunting at river level. Additional avifauna include bobwhites, robins, cardinals, kingfishers, turkey vultures, and various owls, hawks, hummingbirds, woodpeckers, swallows, and wrens.

Others
The South Branch in Smoke Hole is home to rainbow trout, black and rock bass and other sunfish as well as eels. A variety of frogs include the wood, bronze, leopard, and green frog, along with spring peepers.

Rare species of butterfly (columbine duskywing, cobweb skipper) live in the open, grassy, limestone habitats of the Canyon. A variety of tiger beetle lives in the sandy, cobblestone habitats along the banks of the South Branch.

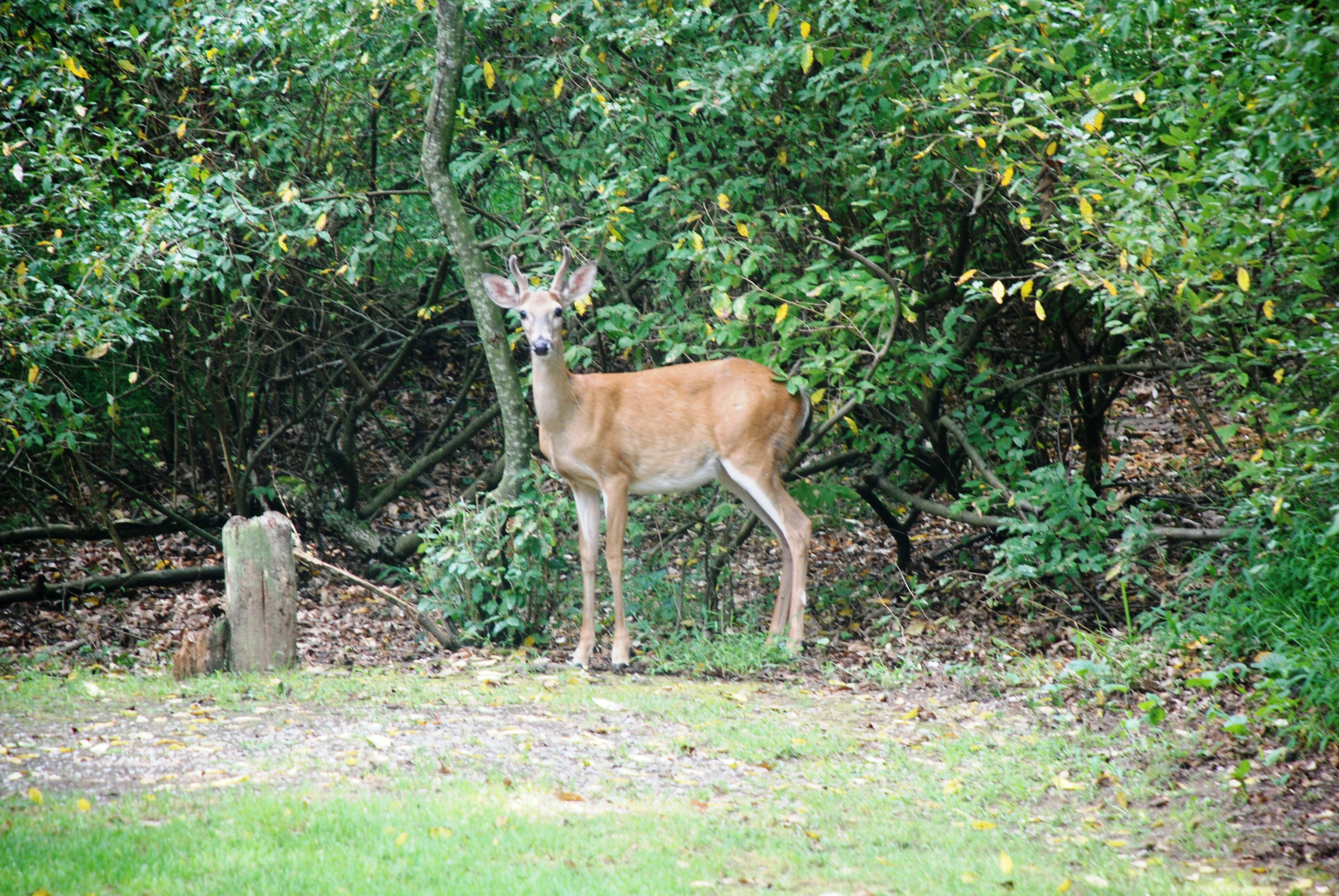
White-tailed deer

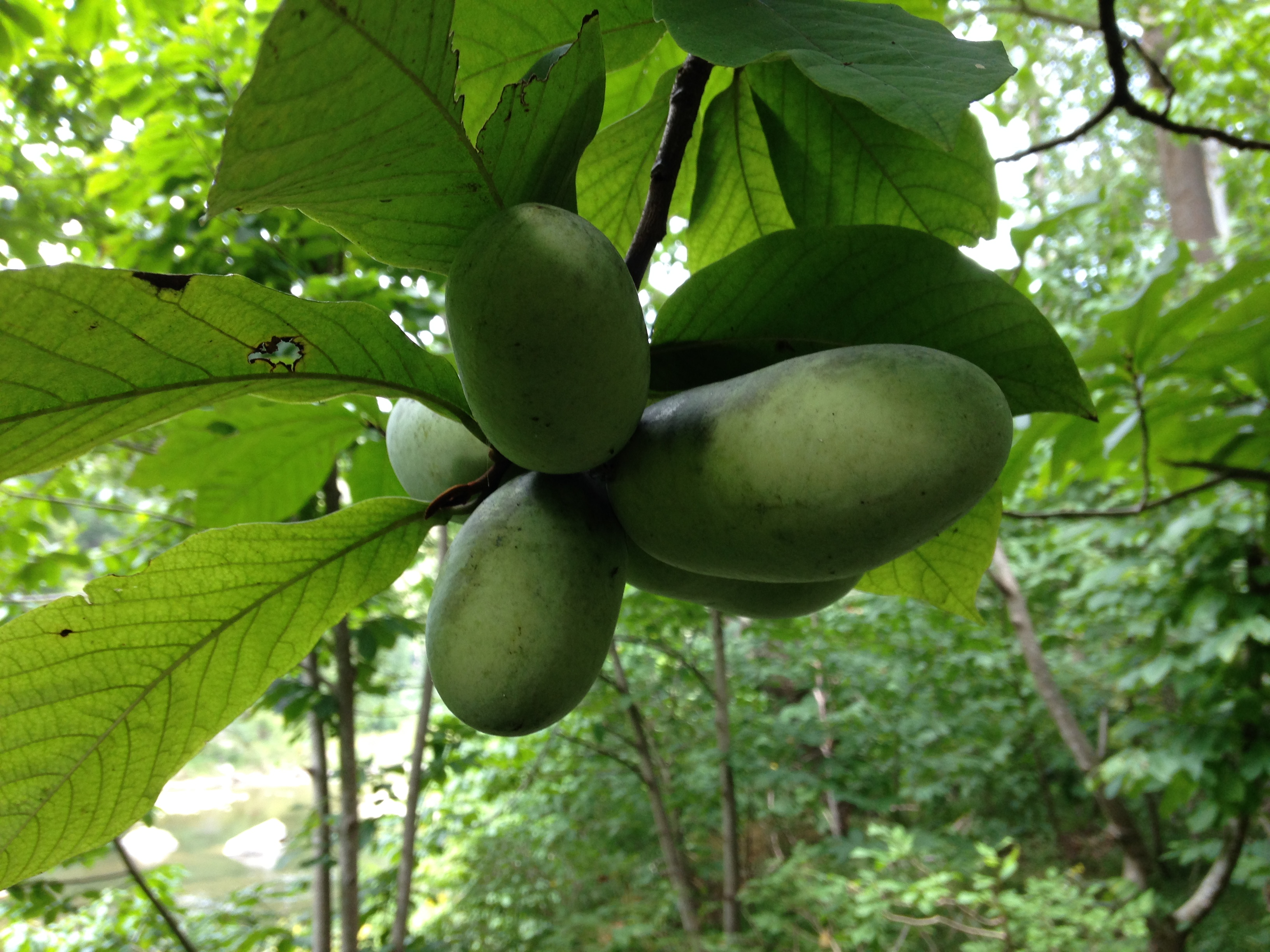
Fruit of common pawpaw (Asimina triloba) in the lower Canyon

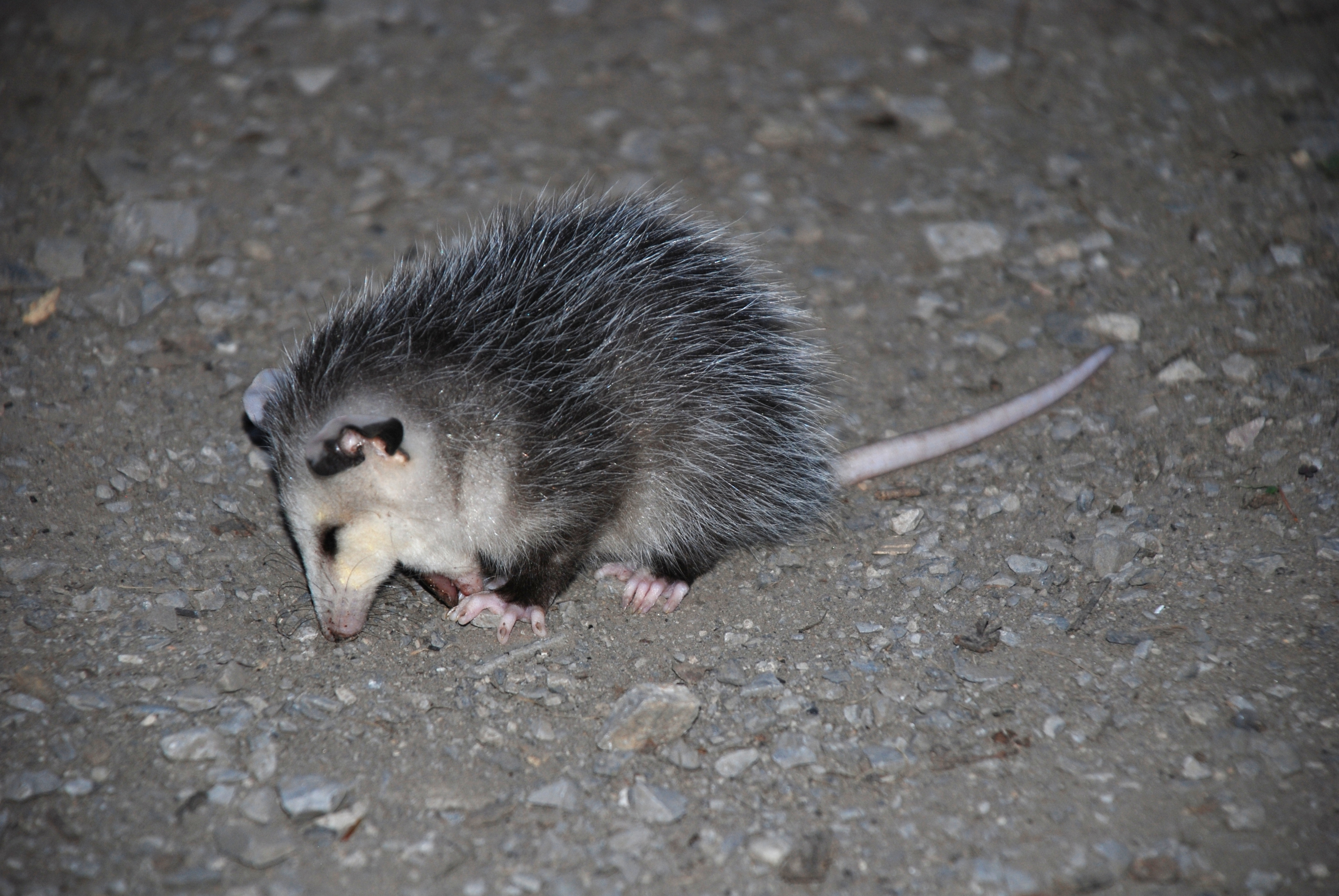
Juvenile Virginia opossum

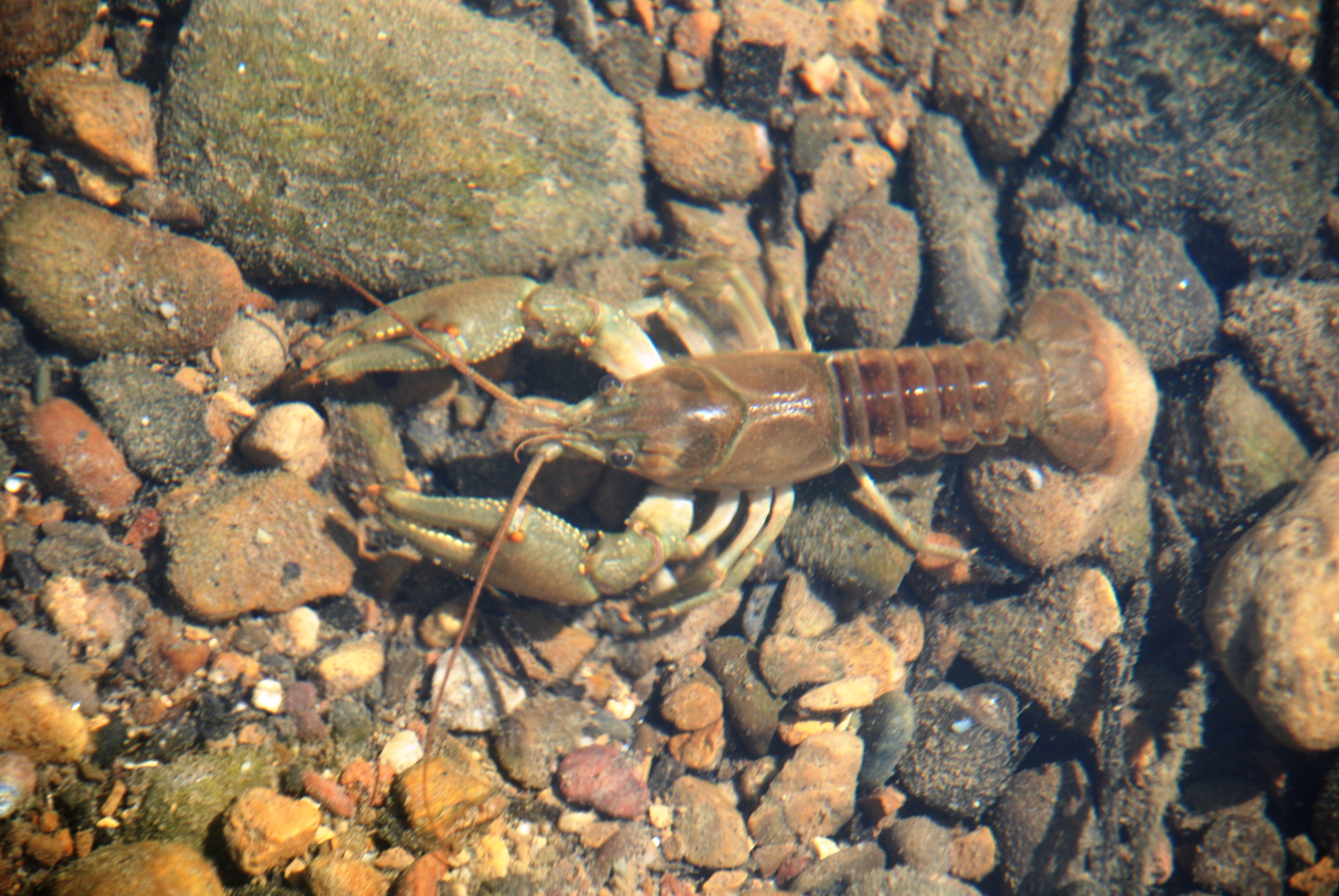
Crayfish in South Branch Potomac River

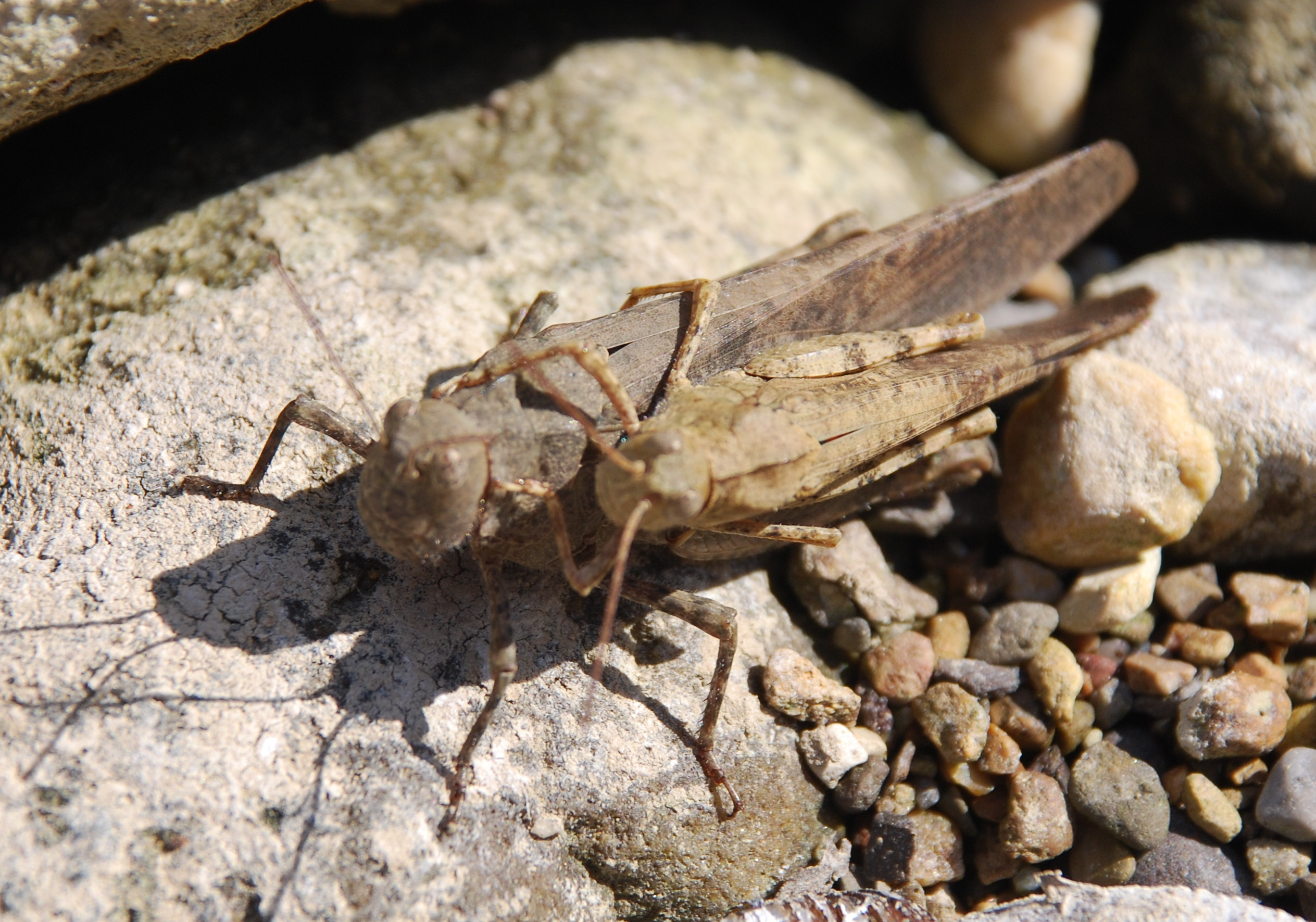
Mating grasshoppers

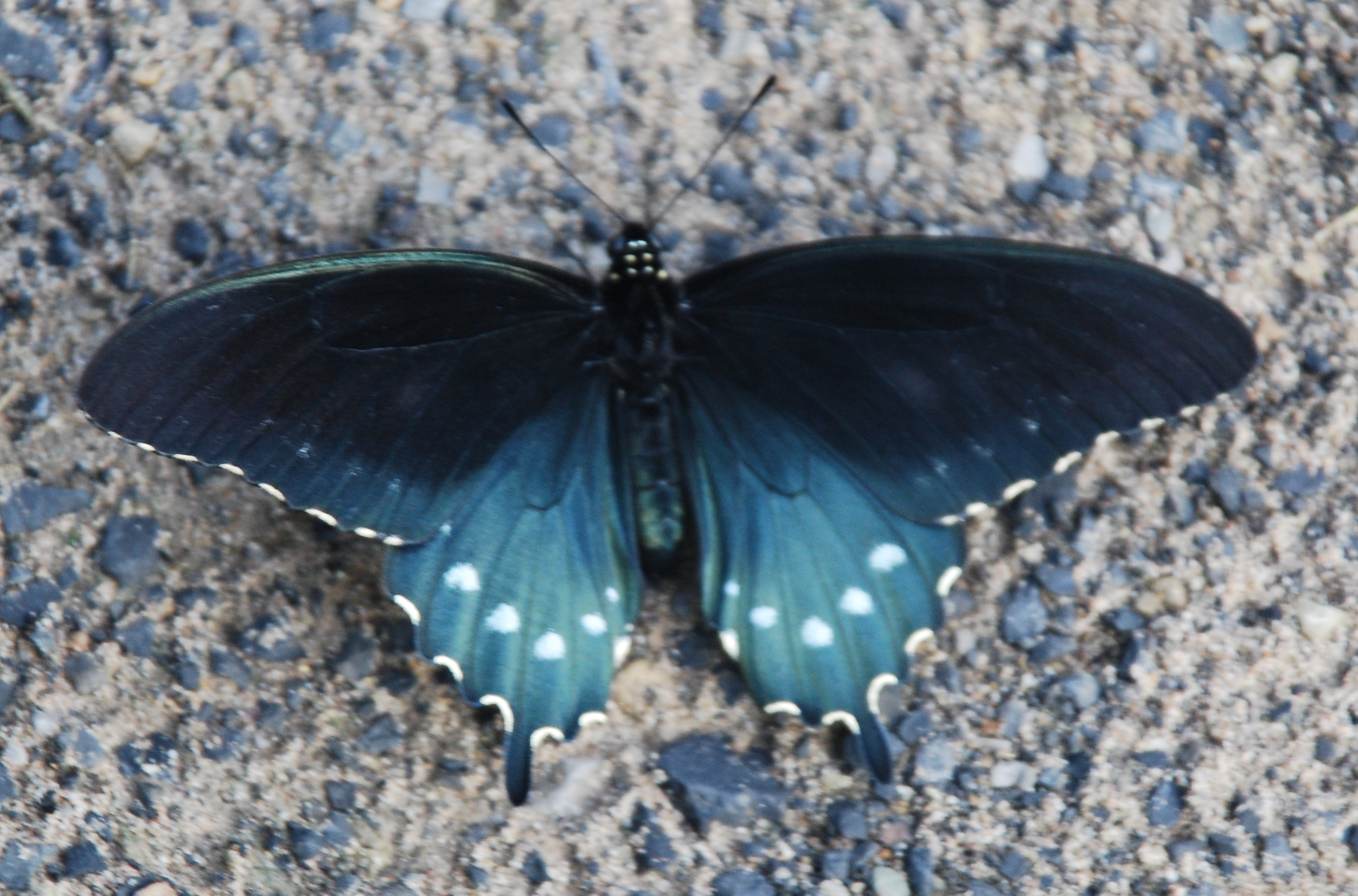
Pipevine swallowtail

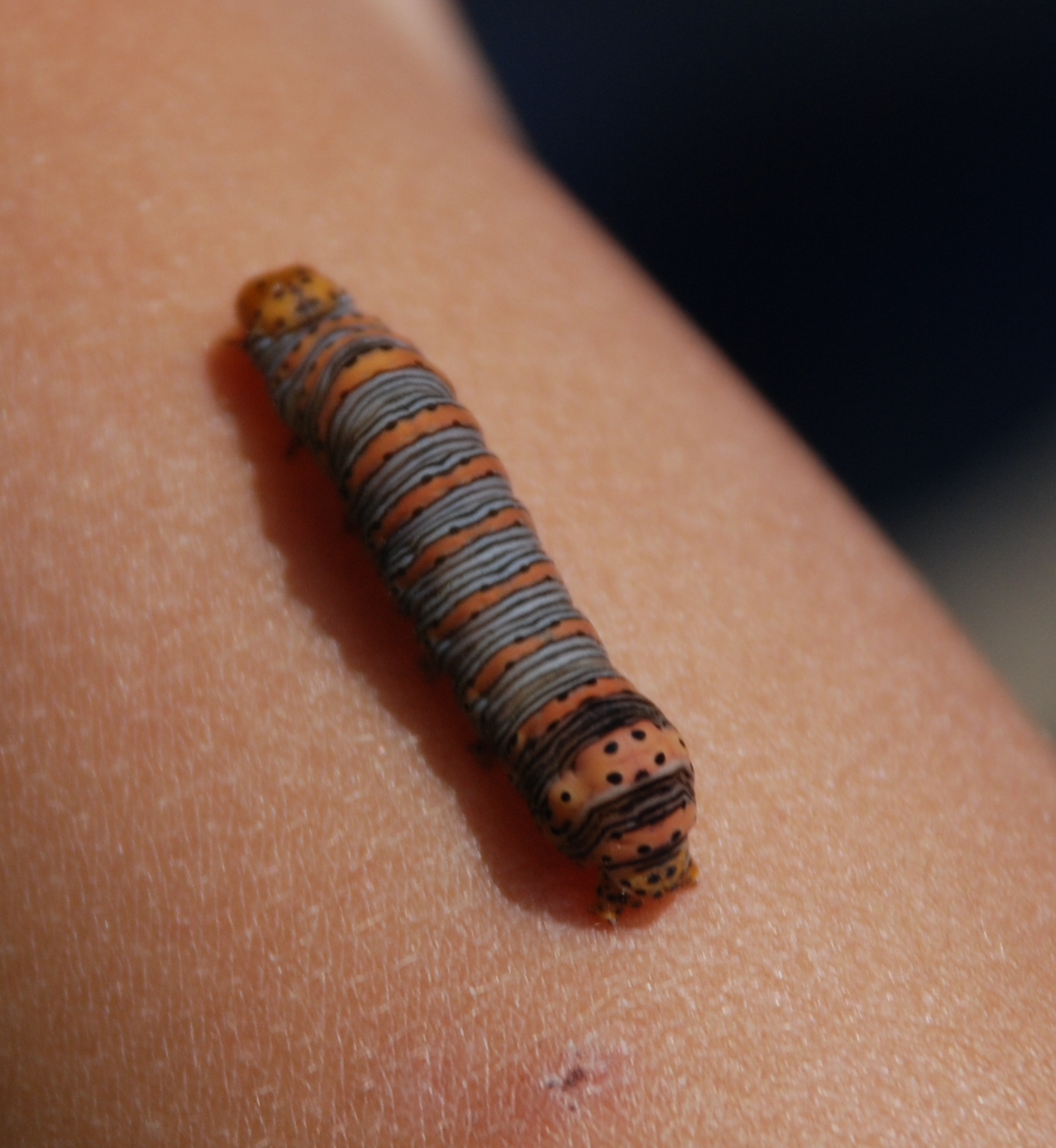
Unidentified caterpillar

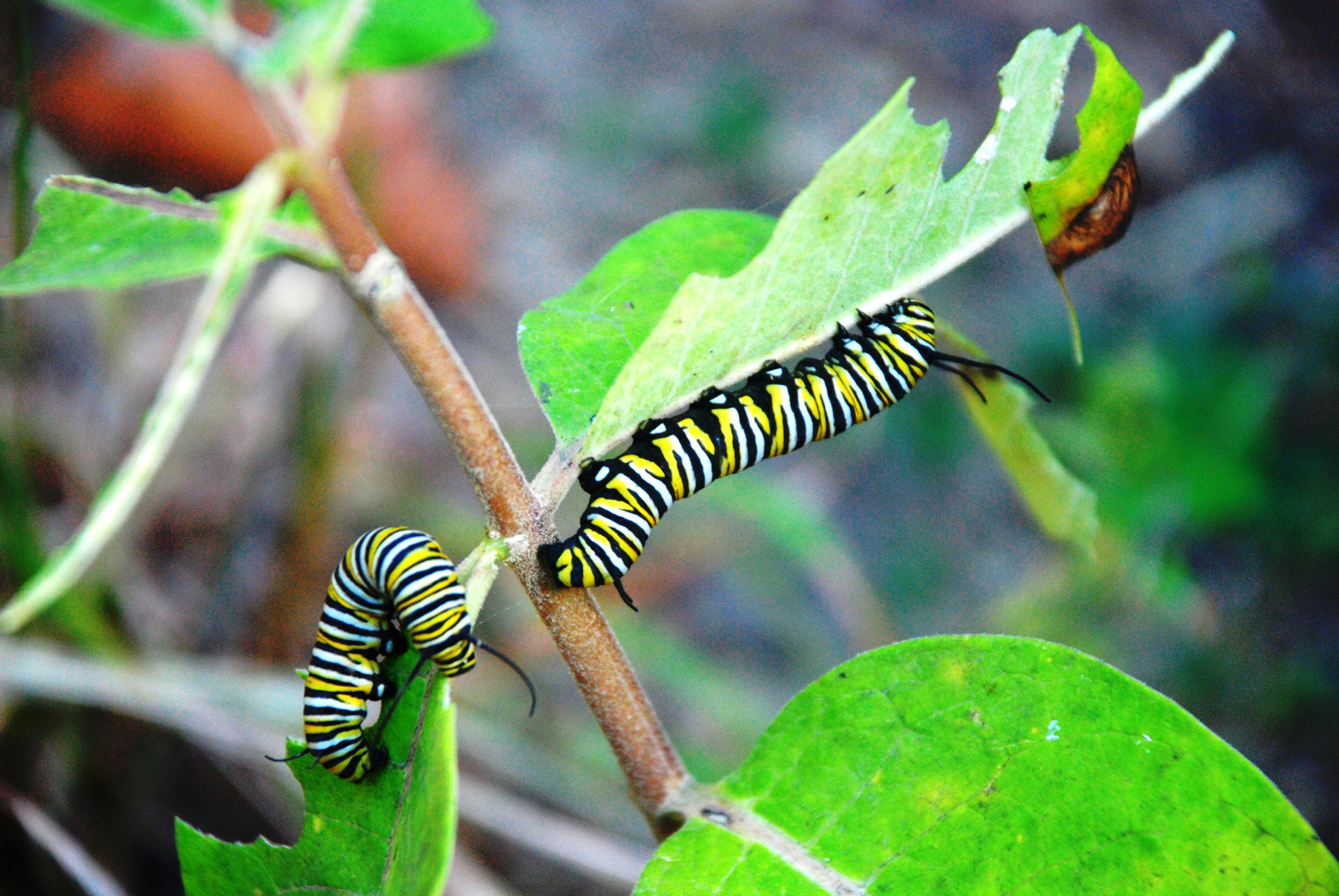
Monarch butterfly caterpillars

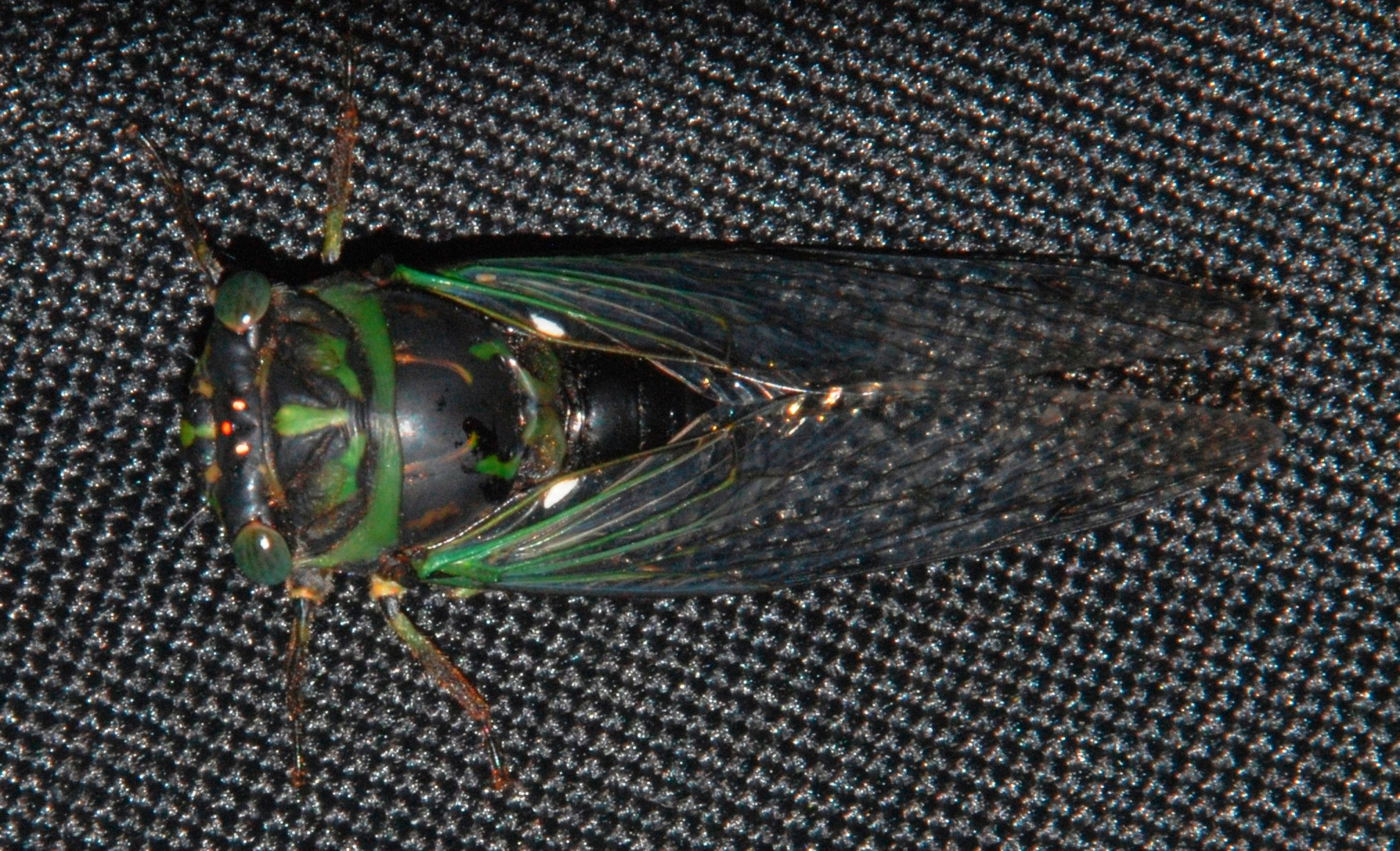
Tibicen cicada

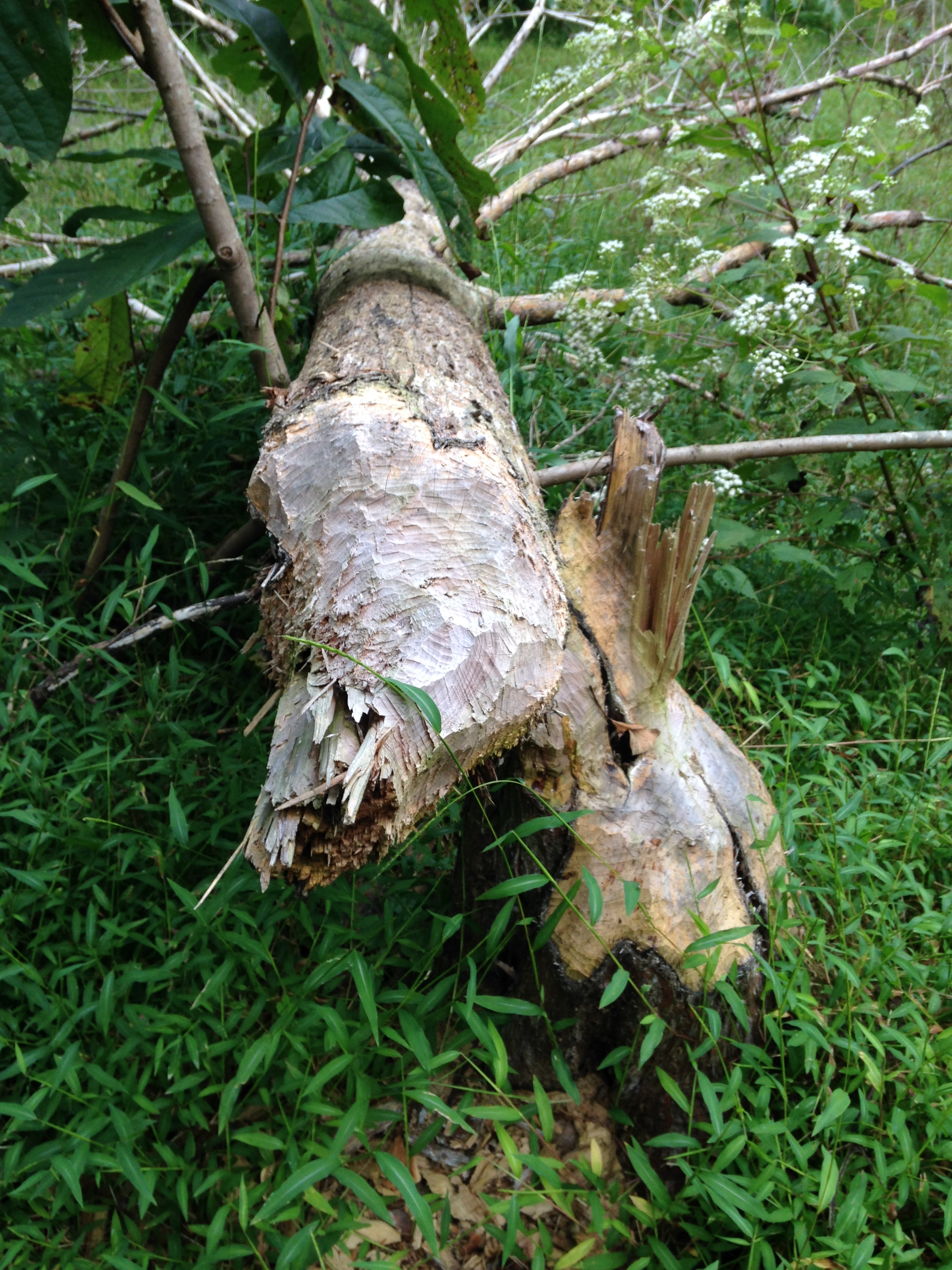
Beaver handiwork in the lower gorge

=== Invasive species ===
An Asian grass known as Japanese stiltgrass was accidentally introduced into the U.S. during the last half of the 20th century and has become a major conservation nuisance nationwide. In recent years, the Canyon has been overwhelmed with this invasive species, first introduced into the state in 1980. The 1996 flood in the Eastern Panhandle of West Virginia spread the seed throughout Smoke Hole, and now it is the most abundantly growing plant in the area. When introduced into a new area, stiltgrass blankets the ground and suffocates other plant life that would ordinarily grow close to the ground. Unchecked, the plant can spread in a manner almost impossible to abate.

Another biological threat to the Canyon is the insect known as hemlock woolly adelgid. Also from Asia and just recently introduced into the Canyon ecosystem, it has been attacking the stands of eastern hemlock there. The bug coats and then kills the tree branches. The Forest Service and The Nature Conservancy are coordinating to find ways to stop the spread of both stiltgrass and the adelgid. A species of Asian beetle known to survive entirely by eating the adelgid is being considered for the Canyon, while a solution to the stiltgrass problem remains as yet unidentified.

Two other non-native, invasive plants seriously threaten the rare limestone plant communities in the Canyon — spotted knapweed and viper's bugloss — and are also the objects of Nature Conservancy abatement projects.

== Recreation ==
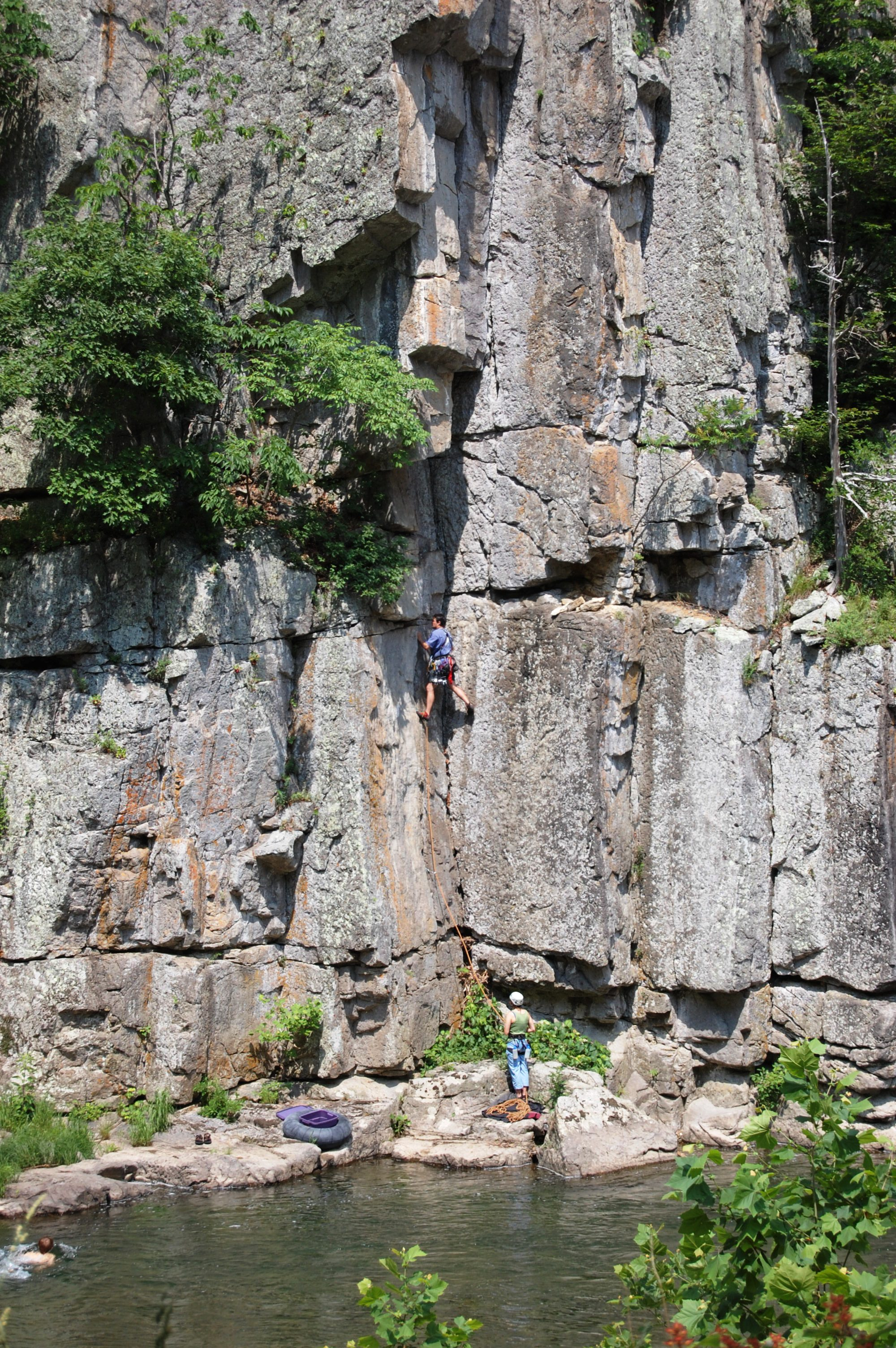
Climbing in Smoke Hole Canyon

Popular activities in Smoke Hole Canyon include fishing (rainbow and golden trout; largemouth and smallmouth bass), hunting (squirrel, grouse, turkey, deer, rabbit and bear), hiking, rock climbing, caving, canoeing and camping (Big Bend Campground).

=== Boating ===
Kayaking and whitewater canoeing provide the best ways to see the Canyon, particularly the lower section where there are no roads or trails at river level. The entire Smoke Hole river run — from US 220 to Petersburg — is about 25 miles (40 km) long. Difficulty ranges from Class I to Class III+.

=== Campgrounds ===
Big Bend Campground is located on a peninsula in the river and features 46 sites with hot and cold water and flush toilets from April 15 to Oct. 1. Hot showers are also provided. Group camping is also available at the Jess Judy Camping Area along the river.

=== Hiking ===
The only maintained trail strictly within the Smoke Hole gorge is the 3.5-mile South Branch Trail, a loop trail starting at river level from the FS picnic area (now abandoned). The blue-blazed trail follows the river upstream, ascends part way up Cave Mountain, passes fields and old farms on its way back downstream, and then drops back down to the river nearly opposite Shreve's Store.

The best hiking in the immediate area is undoubtedly the 24-mile-long North Fork Mountain Trail. This stretches along the crest of North Fork Mountain from U.S. 33 (in the south) to where the Smoke Hole Road (28/11) nears State Route 28 just west of Petersburg (in the north). Other trailheads for NFMT, which looks down upon Smoke Hole from the west, are also located along Smoke Hole Road.

=== Climbing ===
There are many opportunities for rock climbing in the canyon, from the walls just inside the Route 220 entrance, to soaring Eagle Rocks, to the shaded walls of Long Branch, the steep stiff routes of Sanctuary and the miles of cliffs lining the west face of North Fork Mountain which can be accessed from trailheads on the canyon rim.

== In popular culture ==
A 2010 documentary film — The Search for Dillinger's Gold, directed by Cam Lemley — alleged that infamous gangster John Dillinger (1903–1934) buried three boxes of gold bullion in a cave somewhere in the Canyon. A man from Oklahoma, claiming to have been a member of Dillinger's gang, hired a local in 1965 to help him locate the legendary loot. Lemley travels no fewer than eight times into the Canyon in search of the swag, estimated to be worth about $10 million. Traveling with other campers and adventurous treasure seekers, the film takes the viewer through raging rapids, unexplored mountain caves, and encounters with wilderness and wildlife native to the region. (Other locations rumored to contain the booty include Mercer, Wisconsin and a farm in northeastern Ohio.)

== See also ==
- Smoke Hole Caverns, located just outside the Canyon, in Hopeville Gorge
