= Helmick, Ohio =

Unincorporated community in Ohio, U.S.

Coordinates: 40°23′30″N 81°56′28″W

Helmick is an unincorporated community in Coshocton County, in the U.S. state of Ohio.

== History ==
A post office called Helmick was in operation between 1862 and 1925. The community was named for William Helmick (1817–1888), a U.S. Representative from Ohio.
