= Smoke Hole Caverns =

Cave in West Virginia, United States

Coordinates: 38°59′09″N 79°16′00″W

Smoke Hole Caverns (SHC) is a picturesque show cave in Grant County in West Virginia's Eastern Panhandle.

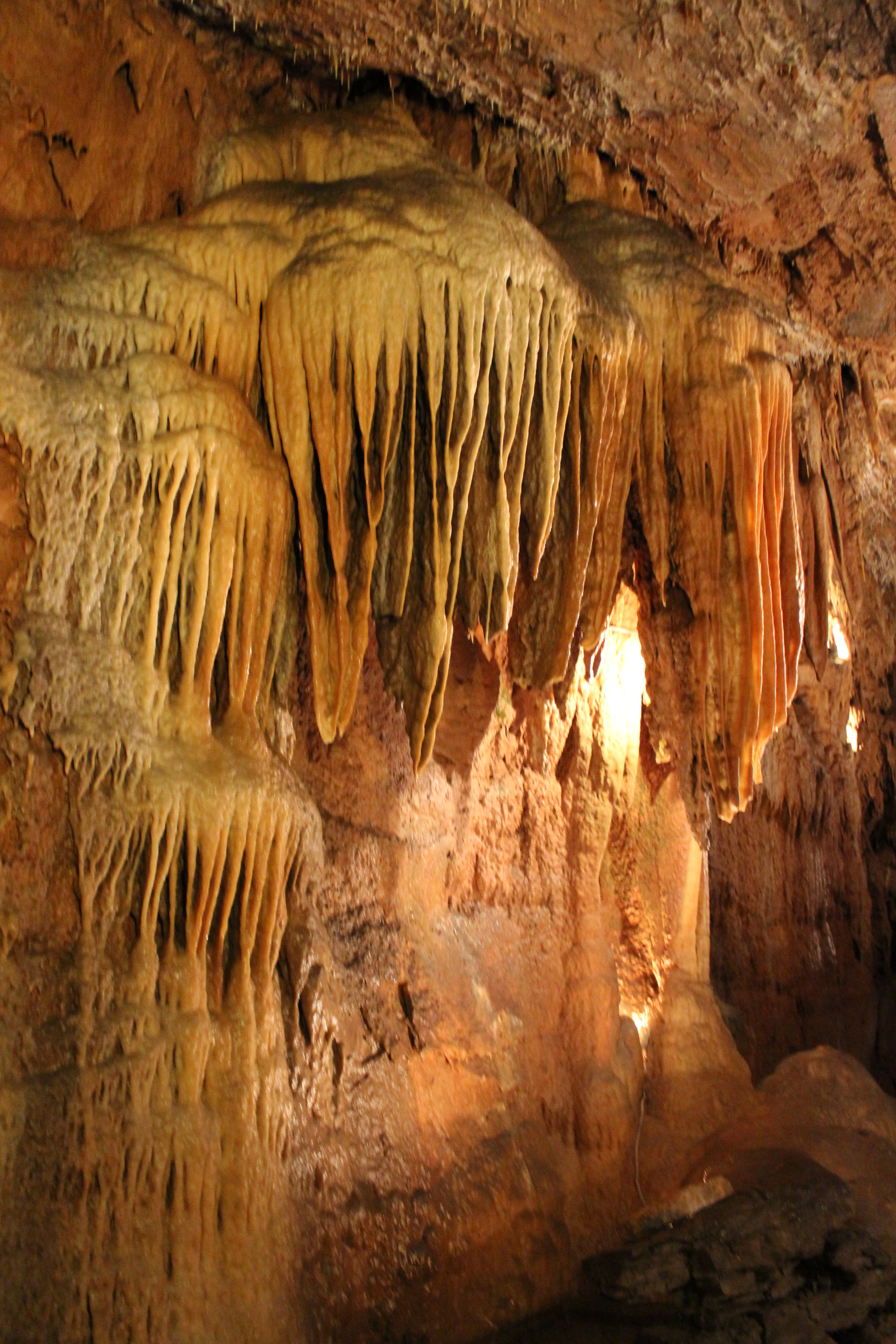
Draperies in the cave

SHC were opened to the public on 30 May 1940. They are located near the Smoke Hole Canyon from which the cave takes its name. They are located on WV 28 13 km west of Petersburg.

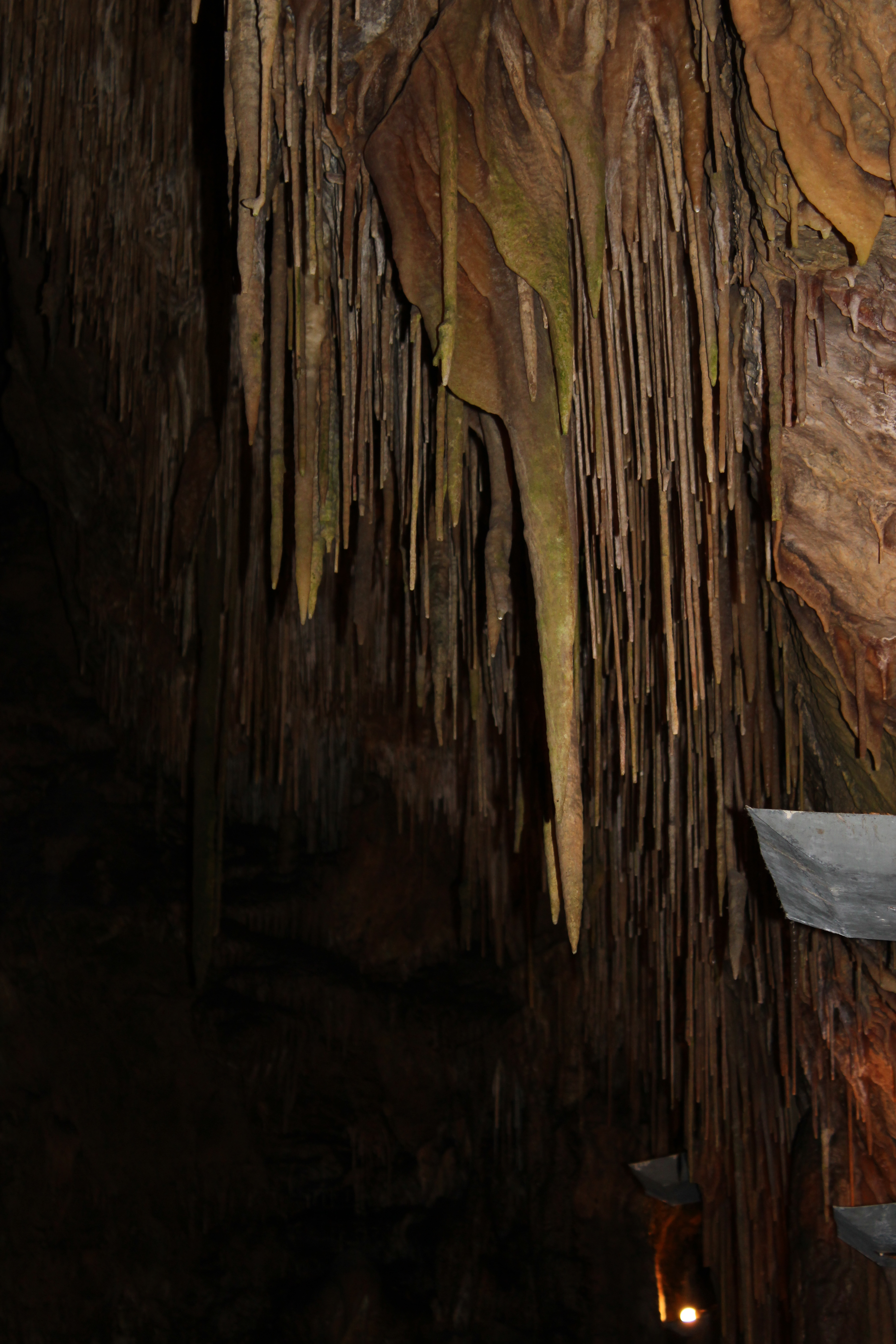
Cave formations

Local lore has it that the cave was utilized during Prohibition by moonshiners. There is only one entrance into the caverns which made it secure and with an ever present supply of fresh water it was a perfect place to produce moonshine. SHC is owned and operated by Jerry and Janet Hedrick.

Smoke Hole Caverns has a feature called "The World's Largest Ribbon Stalactite", as well as unusual helicitites, a crystal cave coral pool, found in only one other cavern in the world and the second highest ceiling of any cavern in the eastern United States. However, it has been adapted significantly to make it tourist friendly, including extensive concrete walkways, the introduction of rainbow trout and aeration into the coral pool and inappropriate lighting, resulting in extensive damage to the stalactites and stalagmites.

== See also ==
- Seneca Caverns
