= Bellefonte and Snowshoe Railroad =

Coal-hauling railroad in Centre County, Pennsylvania

Bellefonte and Snow Shoe Railroad

Overview
- Headquarters: Bellefonte
- Locale: Centre County, Pennsylvania
- Dates of operation: 1859–1881
- Successor: Bald Eagle Valley Railroad

Technical
- Track gauge: 4 ft 8 1/2 in (1,435 mm) standard gauge

The Bellefonte and Snow Shoe Railroad was a coal-hauling railroad in Centre County, Pennsylvania. Begun in 1859, it came under the control of the Pennsylvania Railroad in 1881. Closing of mines in the 1930s resulted in the decline of traffic on the railroad, which was abandoned in 1959.

== Origins and construction ==
The line was originally chartered as the Allegheny and Bald Eagle Railroad, Coal and Iron Company on June 12, 1839. The incorporators included Thomas Burnside and other investors in the Bald Eagle and Spring Creek Navigation canal then under construction, as well as Jacob Gratz, a Philadelphia investor in coal lands who owned over 40,000 acres (16,000 ha) in the vicinity of Snow Shoe. It was to extend from the western side of the Allegheny Mountains to Bald Eagle Creek. For many years, however, it showed no organized activity, although the Pennsylvania General Assembly periodically renewed its charter. In 1855, the purchase of the Gratz coal lands by William A. Thomas, a Bellefonte ironmaster, spurred further activity and investment from Philadelphians connected with Thomas. On May 2, 1855, a charter supplement allowed it to extend to Bellefonte, the head of the Bald Eagle and Spring Creek Navigation. In 1857, a survey of the line was finally completed. Construction began in 1858, and it was completed in 1859, from the coal mines at Snow Shoe to Snow Shoe Intersection (now Wingate) in the Bald Eagle Valley. It also built 4 miles (6.4 km) of line from Snow Shoe Intersection to Bellefonte on behalf of the financially-distressed Tyrone and Lock Haven Railroad in exchange for a 999-year lease of the newly built track. Surprisingly, even with the added cost of the Bellefonte extension, the line was built for $269,000, well under the company's capitalization of $600,000, a feat unusual in an era where cost overruns requiring bond issues were common.

The name of the company was changed to the Bellefonte and Snowshoe Railroad Company on March 24, 1859, shortly before a ceremonial opening on 21 June 1859, featuring a special train from Bellefonte to Clarks, then the terminus of the line. It would be extended to Snow Shoe later in the year, and regular passenger service begun in December.

== Independent operation ==
Moshannon Railroad
Overview
- Headquarters: Bellefonte?
- Locale: Centre County, Pennsylvania
- Dates of operation: 1861–1881
- Successor: Bald Eagle Valley Railroad

Technical
- Track gauge: 4 ft 8 1/2 in (1,435 mm) standard gauge

The railroad's operations began at Bellefonte, site of coal-hungry iron furnaces and the head of navigation on the Bald Eagle & Spring Creek canal. Using the right-of-way of the Tyrone and Lock Haven, it passed north through the narrow valley of Spring Creek to reach the Bald Eagle Valley at Milesburg. The Tyrone and Lock Haven was intended to stretch north up the valley to Lock Haven and south to Tyrone, but only a little grading had been accomplished north of Milesburg or south of Wingate, where the Bellefonte & Snow Shoe turned onto its own tracks. It followed the valley of Wallace Run through Gum Stump, and, at the forks of Wallace Run, climbed the side of a mountain by a series of four switchbacks. The line continued climbing through Rhoads following the edges of the Jonathan Run and South Fork Beech Creek gorges, crossing the latter and winding through Fountain to reach Snow Shoe. The total length of the line, from Wingate to Snow Shoe, was 20.26 miles (32.61 km) long. While they slowed operations, switchbacks were necessary to ascend the steep heights of the Allegheny Front, reducing the ruling grade to a stiff but manageable 2.84% on the ascent from Wingate. The ruling grade from Snow Shoe to the summit at Rhoads was less, at 1.09%. William Harris, the engineer who laid it out, had roughly balanced the tractive effort necessary to haul loaded coal cars from Snow Shoe up to Rhoads with that needed to bring the same cars empty up from Wingate.

As new mines opened up in the region, extensions to the railroad began to be built. A line built in 1861 from Snow Shoe north, then west to Gillintown and Moshannon (also known as Per Se) was incorporated on April 11, 1863 as the Moshannon Railroad, and appears to have been operated as part of the Bellefonte and Snow Shoe, adding 2.00 miles (3.22 km) to that road.

In the meantime, the Pennsylvania Railroad had taken control of the Tyrone and Lock Haven, reorganized in 1861 as the Bald Eagle Valley Railroad, and begun to extend it up and down the valley. In 1863, it was completed south from Wingate to Vail, where it reached the PRR-controlled Tyrone and Clearfield Railroad, and in 1865, the line was finished from Milesburg to Lock Haven.

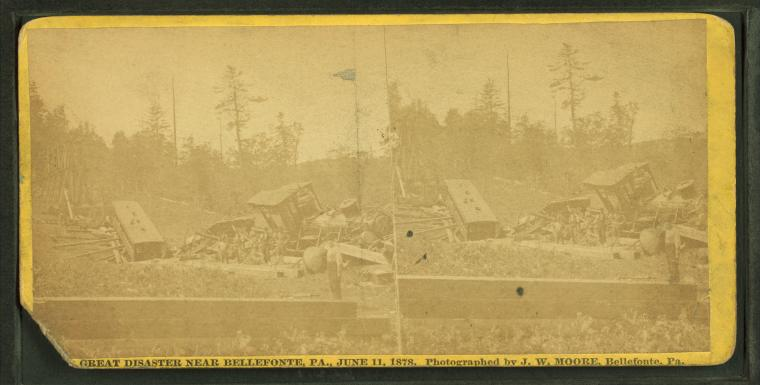
Stereoscopic view of the wreck at Miller's Spring Hollow.

The Bellefonte & Snow Shoe continued to improve its physical plant, stringing a telegraph line from Snow Shoe to Wingate in 1869. In 1871, the directors resolved to construct a branch from Bellefonte to the vicinity of Oak Hall to connect with the Lewisburg, Centre and Spruce Creek Railroad when it reached that point. However, the financial difficulties of the latter long delayed its construction, and while the link would be built (as the Bellefonte, Nittany and Lemont Railroad), it would not be the Bellefonte & Snow Shoe that would construct it.

A serious wreck occurred on the railroad on June 11, 1878, when the Miller's Spring Trestle collapsed under the southbound mixed train from Snow Shoe to Bellefonte and it fell 55 feet (17 m) into a ravine. One passenger was killed, and two passengers and four crewmen were injured.

== Snow-Shoe Branch ==
Map of the PRR Snow Shoe Branch and connecting railroads.

The Bellefonte & Snow Shoe ended its independent operation in January 1881, when it was sold to the Bald Eagle Valley Railroad, long a subsidiary of the PRR. The Bellefonte & Snow Shoe and the Moshannon Railroads were merged into the Bald Eagle Valley on April 7, 1881 to become the Snow-Shoe Branch.

Several new branches were built off the line under Bald Eagle Valley management to reach nearby coal mines. Two were constructed in 1890. The Sugar Camp Branch diverged 0.8 miles (1.3 km) north of Snow Shoe and ran north, then turned west and rounded a horseshoe curve to cross the Beech Creek Railroad and descend to Clarence, along the North Fork Beech Creek, ending near Lehigh Valley Coal Co. #9 Mine with a length of 4.75 miles (7.64 km). The Grauer Branch left the Sugar Camp Branch just north of the Beech Creek crossing and ran 2.04 miles (3.28 km) north up Cherry Run, reaching Sugar Camp and the Clarence Colliery #1. The Fountain Branch was built in 1903, 1.32 miles (2.12 km) in length, crossing the Beech Creek Railroad to serve Lehigh Valley Coal Co. #14 Mine.

On March 31, 1908, the Bald Eagle Valley Railroad was at last merged into the PRR, including the Snow-Shoe and other branches. The PRR would construct a few more mine branches, extending the Sugar Camp Branch 3.87 miles (6.23 km) in 1914 and 1915. The extension continued east out of Clarence, then climbed steeply north to Poorman Side, then descended along Contrary Run and (Big) Sandy Run to Cherry Run #4 Mine of the Big Sandy Coal Company near Shettleston. The Big Sandy Branch, built in 1915, left the Sugar Camp Branch along Big Sandy Run and climbed out of its valley and along that of an unnamed tributary, extending 2.41 miles (3.88 km) to Lehigh Valley Coal Co. #25 Mine.

However, the railroad was soon to pass into a decline. The Fountain branch had already been removed by 1923. The Great Depression caused the closure of most of the coal mines in the area, and the Big Sandy Branch was abandoned in 1935. A fire brick manufacturer near Clarence and the remaining coal mines still provided some business to the line, but the mine branches continued to be pruned back. On March 6, 1959, the entire line from Wingate north was abandoned.
