= Bald Eagle and Spring Creek Navigation =

Canal company in central Pennsylvania, US

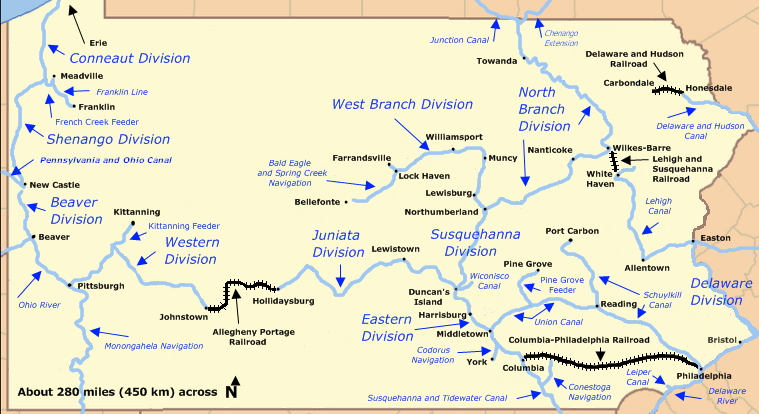
- Map of historic Pennsylvania canals and connecting railroads

Specifications
- Status: Abandoned except for historic interest

History
- Original owner: Bald Eagle and Spring Creek Navigation Company
- Date of first use: 1837
- Date completed: 1848
- Date closed: 1865

Geography
- Start point: Flemington
- End point: Bellefonte
- Connects to: Bald Eagle Cut

The Bald Eagle and Spring Creek Navigation Company was a canal company in central Pennsylvania intended to link the iron industry of Bellefonte, Pennsylvania, with the Pennsylvania canal system. Opened for half its length in 1837, the remainder of the canal was not completed until 1848. Around 1860, the Bellefonte and Snow Shoe Railroad built a wharf at Milesburg, Pennsylvania, and began regular shipments of coal over the canal. Badly damaged by flooding in 1865, it was not rebuilt; a paralleling railroad completed that year replaced it. The lower end of the canal remained in service until the 1870s, and the corporation was formally dissolved in 1877.

== Charter and construction ==
In 1827, the Commonwealth of Pennsylvania began construction on the West Branch Canal, an extension of the state-owned canal system following the West Branch Susquehanna River. In 1829, citizens of Bellefonte, Pennsylvania, commissioned a survey for a canal to connect their town with the West Branch Canal. The survey followed Bald Eagle Creek southwest through its valley as far as Milesburg, and then turn south to follow Spring Creek through its water gap in Bald Eagle Mountain to Bellefonte, center of the local iron industry. In theory, this entire route was navigable—residents of Bellefonte were said to have dragged a flatboat up Spring Creek in order to prove the town the head of navigation and beat out Milesburg as the county seat of Centre County in 1800—but in practice, improvements were necessary to facilitate the heavy traffic in iron from the furnaces.

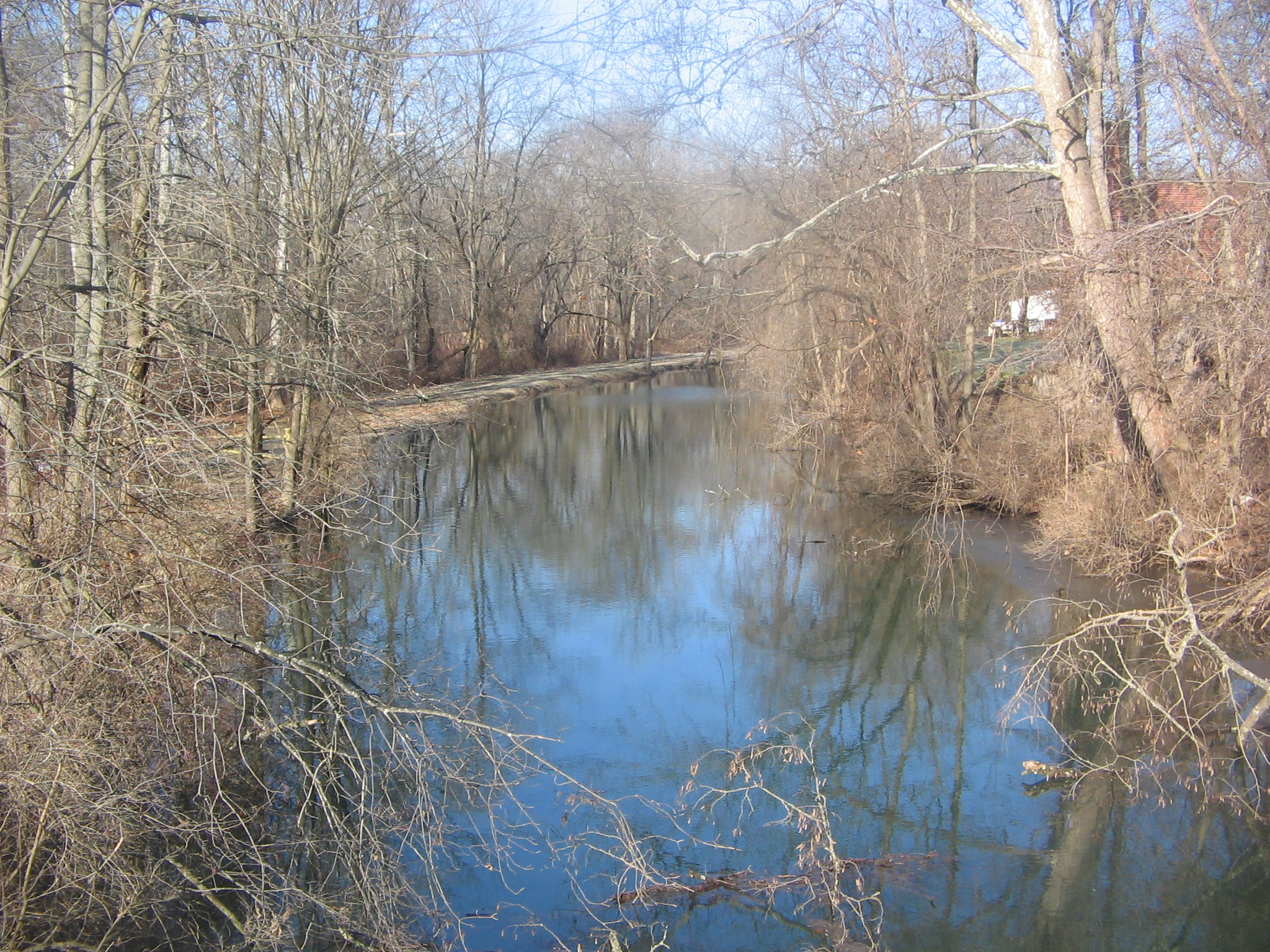
Bald Eagle Cut in 2010 in Flemington

Due in part to the political support of Bellefonte's Judge Thomas Burnside, the state legislature financed the construction of the Bald Eagle Cross-Cut to facilitate a connection to a canal along Bald Eagle Creek. This 4-mile (6.4 km) waterway, was built from the West Branch Canal through Lock Haven to Flemington on the Bald Eagle Creek. The West Branch Canal to Lock Haven and the Bald Eagle Cross-Cut were both completed in the autumn of 1834.

Meanwhile, the Bald Eagle and Spring Creek Navigation was incorporated on April 14, 1834, with charter rights to build a canal from Flemington to Bellefonte. The legislature guaranteed the 5% interest on its stock issue for twenty-five years. The 12.5 miles (20.1 km) Lower Division of the Bald Eagle & Spring Creek was opened from Flemington to Howard, site of an iron furnace, in the fall of 1837, and by the end of 1838 reached Dowdy's Hole, just below Curtin and site of the Eagle Ironworks. However, the Panic of 1837 led to straitened economic conditions throughout the country, and delayed further construction for a decade. The next segment, from Dowdy's Hole to Milesburg, was opened on September 3, 1847. The final segment along Spring Creek into Bellefonte, completing the 12.5 miles (20.1 km) Upper Division, was opened on September 1, 1848. The first canal boat to arrive from Philadelphia was the Jane Curtin, carrying supplies for the Valentine & Thomas ironworks.

== Operation and destruction ==
The canal quickly became a major shipper of bituminous coal and pig iron to downstream consumers, as well as a carrier of local agricultural traffic. However, the Commonwealth of Pennsylvania was experiencing increasing difficulties in funding the maintenance of its over-extended canal network. The Bald Eagle Cross-Cut, the West Branch Canal, and the Susquehanna Division of the Pennsylvania Canal, were divested in 1857. These waterways were initially given to the Sunbury and Erie Railroad, to help fund its completion, which in turn sold them to be organized as the West Branch and Susquehanna Canal.

During 1857, the canal was threatened by the prospect of a competitor. The Tyrone and Lock Haven Railroad was chartered to run down the Bald Eagle Valley between Tyrone and Lock Haven, and to build a branch to Bellefonte, paralleling the canal route. However, the Tyrone and Lock Haven was unable to secure sufficient financing for its immediate construction, completing only the branch from Bellefonte to Milesburg and a short section of line from Milesburg to the Bellefonte and Snow Shoe Railroad at Wingate by 1859. It was operated by the latter road for the next several years. There was considerable overlap between the investors in the canal and the Bellefonte and Snow Shoe, so relations were cooperative. When the canal's stock became essentially worthless in April 1860 with the expiration of the state's interest guarantee, Andrew G. Curtin, the canal company's president, arranged the transfer of one-third of the canal stock to the Bellefonte and Snow Shoe in exchange for building a "shipping port" at Milesburg. Coal carried down by the railroad from the Snow Shoe area could be loaded here into eastbound canal boats. The railroad received rebates on the canal tolls in exchange for coal traffic, and in 1864, it agreed to help repair and enlarge the canal to accommodate the largest boats used on the West Branch and Susquehanna. The shadow of competition loomed: the Pennsylvania Railroad took up the financing of the Tyrone and Lock Haven and reorganized it as the Bald Eagle Valley Railroad in 1861, and resumed construction on the line from Milesburg to Lock Haven.

The enlargement never took place. Major flooding took place in the Susquehanna watershed during March 15–17, 1865, ravaging the canal infrastructure. With little prospect of effective competition with the new railroad line, completed later that year, it was never rebuilt. The Lower Division survived the flooding and continued to serve sawmills at the mouth of Beech Creek. In 1869, it came under the control of the Pennsylvania Railroad, which abandoned it within five years. The company was formally dissolved in 1877.

Stonework from one of the locks is still visible at the former site of the McCoy and Linn ironworks, in the water gap of Spring Creek between Bellefonte and Milesburg. (The canal lock itself was not impacted by the removal of the 1926 hydroelectric dam at the ironworks site in August and September 2007, but the canal basin between the lock and the dam was filled in with the dam rubble as well as sediments that had built up behind the dam.) It is hoped that future archaeological work may be carried out on the lock itself and the stonework is in places in need of stabilization.

The remains of Locks No. 4 and No. 5 of this canal were included in the National Register of Historic Places nomination for Harmony Forge Mansion, and listed in 1979.

== Points of interest ==
| Feature | Coordinates | Description |
|---|---|---|
| Flemington | 41°07′21″N 77°28′13″W | Borough at the eastern terminus |
| Howard | 41°00′51″N 77°39′29″W | Borough near the midpoint of the canal |
| Bellefonte | 40°54′48″N 77°46′42″W | Borough at the western terminus |

== See also ==
- List of canals in the United States
