= Bald Eagle (disambiguation) =

The Bald eagle, also known as the American eagle, is a North American bird of prey.

Bald Eagle may also refer to:

== Places ==
=== Pennsylvania ===
- Bald Eagle, Pennsylvania, in Blair County
- Bald Eagle Township, Pennsylvania, in Clinton County
- Bald Eagle Creek (Little Juniata River tributary)
- Bald Eagle Creek (West Branch Susquehanna River tributary)
- Bald Eagle Formation, a geologic bedrock unit in central Pennsylvania
- Bald Eagle Mountain
- Bald Eagle State Forest, in Centre, Clinton, Mifflin, Snyder, and Union Counties
- Bald Eagle State Park, in Centre County
- Bald Eagle Valley

=== Elsewhere ===
- Bald Eagle, Kentucky
- Bald Eagle, Minnesota

== Other uses ==
- Bald Eagle (clipper), an American sailing ship
- Bald Eagle (horse), American Champion Thoroughbred raceflag
- Woapalanne (d. 1779), known as Chief Bald Eagle, Lenape tribal leader
