= Bald Eagle Valley =

Landform in Pennsylvania, US

Bald Eagle Valley, Pennsylvania
- Region
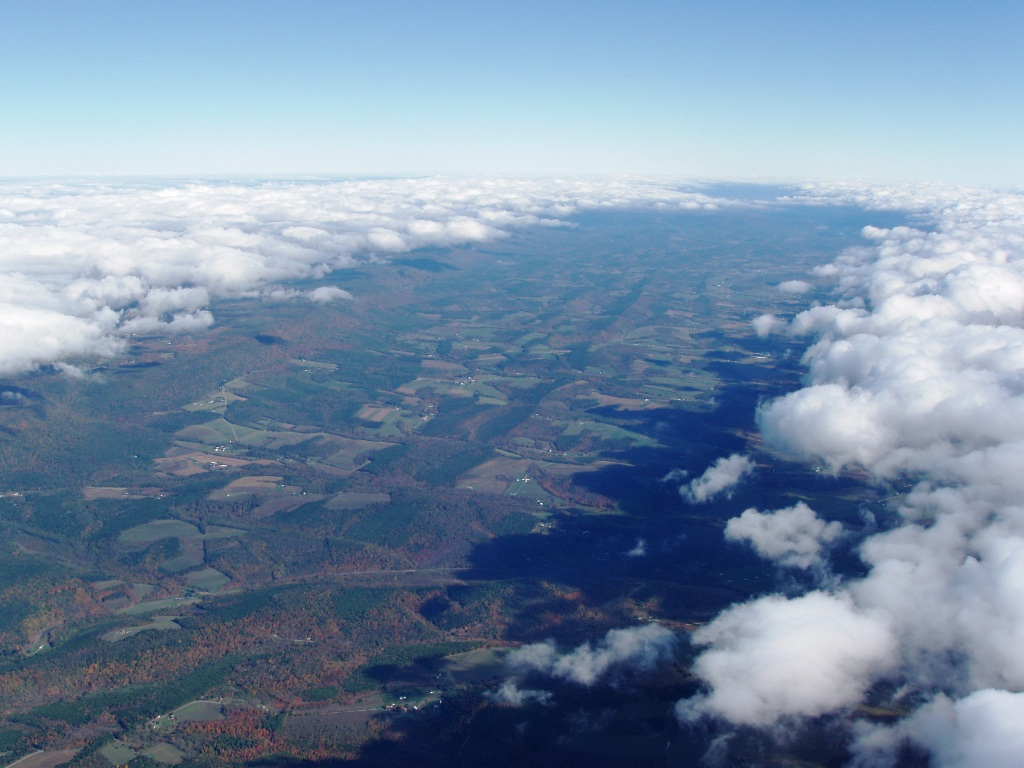
- A wave window over the Bald Eagle Valley looking north from Port Matilda. The Allegheny Front, which forms the wave, is under the left edge of the window.

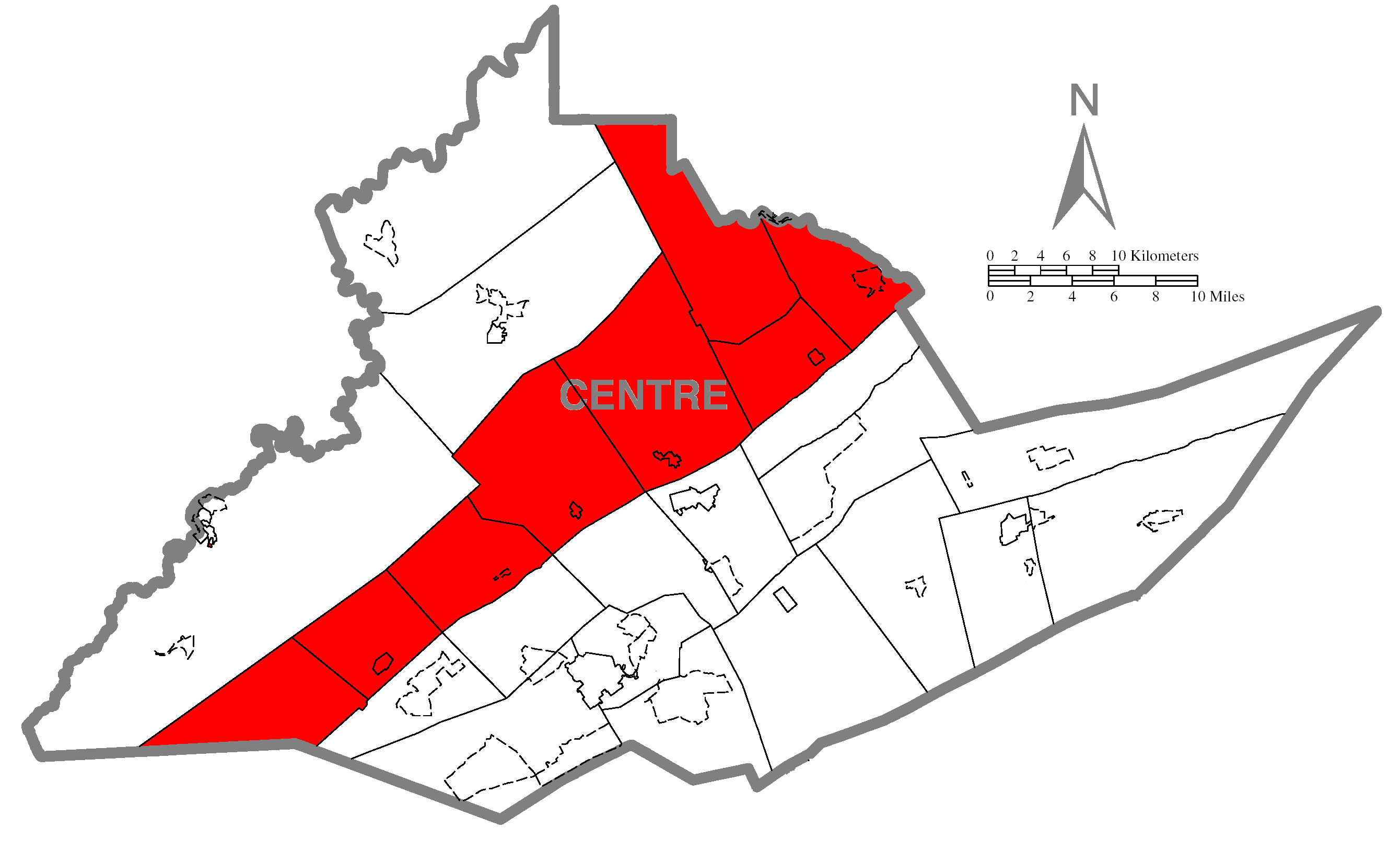
- Bald Eagle Valley region of Centre County, Pennsylvania (not including Clinton County)
- Country: United States
- State: Pennsylvania
- County: Centre Clinton
- Settled: 1769
- Named for: Chief Woapalanne
- Time zone: UTC-5 (Eastern (EST))
  - Summer (DST): UTC-4 (EDT)
- Area code: 814

Bald Eagle Valley is a low-lying area in Pennsylvania that drains into Bald Eagle Creek between the Allegheny Front and Bald Eagle Mountain, south of the West Branch Susquehanna River, in the Ridge-and-valley Appalachians. The valley is located southwest of West Branch Susquehanna Valley and includes Williamsport, Nittany Valley, and State College in the central portion of Centre County and southern portion of Clinton County.

The valley runs from Port Matilda down to Lock Haven, and it includes most of the Bald Eagle Area School District and Bald Eagle Township. Bald Eagle State Park is in the valley; the park includes the Joseph Foster Sayers Reservoir around Howard, a prominent topographic feature formed by damming Bald Eagle Creek.

== Geography ==
The Bald Eagle Valley borders the Nittany Valley to the south, Moshannon Valley and Allegheny Plateau to the northwest, and the West Branch Susquehanna Valley to the northeast.

== History ==
The valley is named for Chief Woapalanne, also known as Chief Bald Eagle, of the Munsee subtribe of the Lenape.

== Municipalities ==
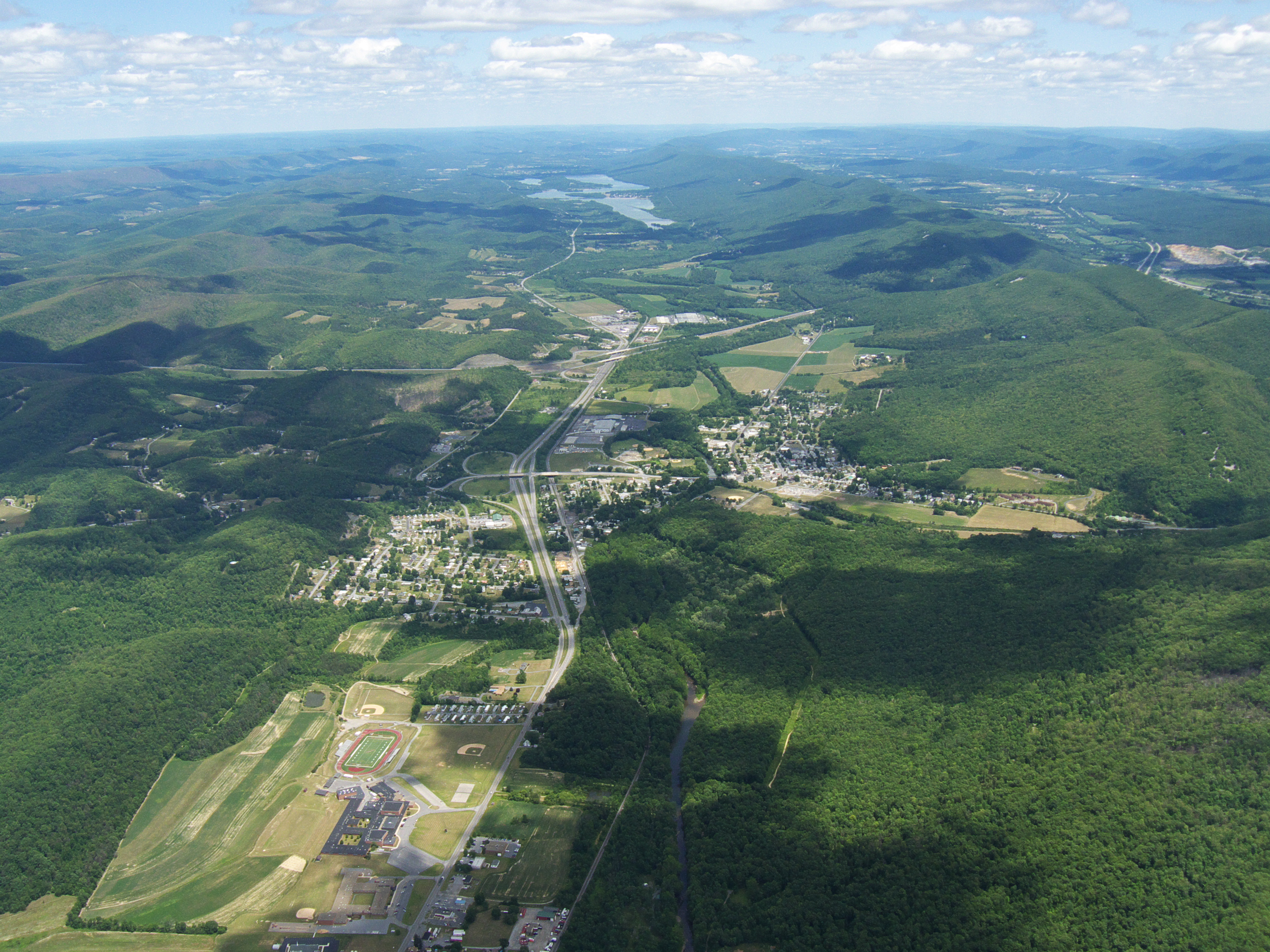
Bald Eagle Valley looking northeast from Wingate. The Bald Eagle High School is at the lower left and the Bald Eagle State Park is near the top center.

From southwest to northeast, downstream along Bald Eagle Creek:

=== Boroughs ===
- Port Matilda
- Unionville
- Milesburg
- Howard
- Beech Creek
- Mill Hall
- Flemington
- Lock Haven

=== Townships ===
- Taylor
- Worth
- Huston
- Union
- Boggs
- Howard
- Curtin
- Liberty
- Beech Creek
- Bald Eagle
- Allison
- Castanea

=== Census-designated places ===
- Julian
- Fleming
- Eagle Creek
- Wingate
- Runville
- Moose Run
- Yarnell
- Holters Crossing
- Mount Eagle
- Eagleville
- Castanea

== Agriculture ==
In the upper valley, Bald Eagle Creek runs at the foot of the ridge in a narrow floodplain. Long narrow farm fields lie along the river, and along the perpendicular side valleys of the creek's tributaries. Smaller irregular sloped fields also lie on the small hills near the floodplain. Further downstream, the floodplain becomes wider, and larger farm fields are found there. Between the floodplain and the Allegheny Plateau, there are two distinct regions. Nearer the floodplain, there are steeper wooded hills, generally not suitable for farming. Closer to the plateau, there are more gently rolling hills, with fields and pastures mixed with woodlots. Corn, hay, alfalfa, and winter wheat are crops commonly grown in the valley.

== Transportation ==
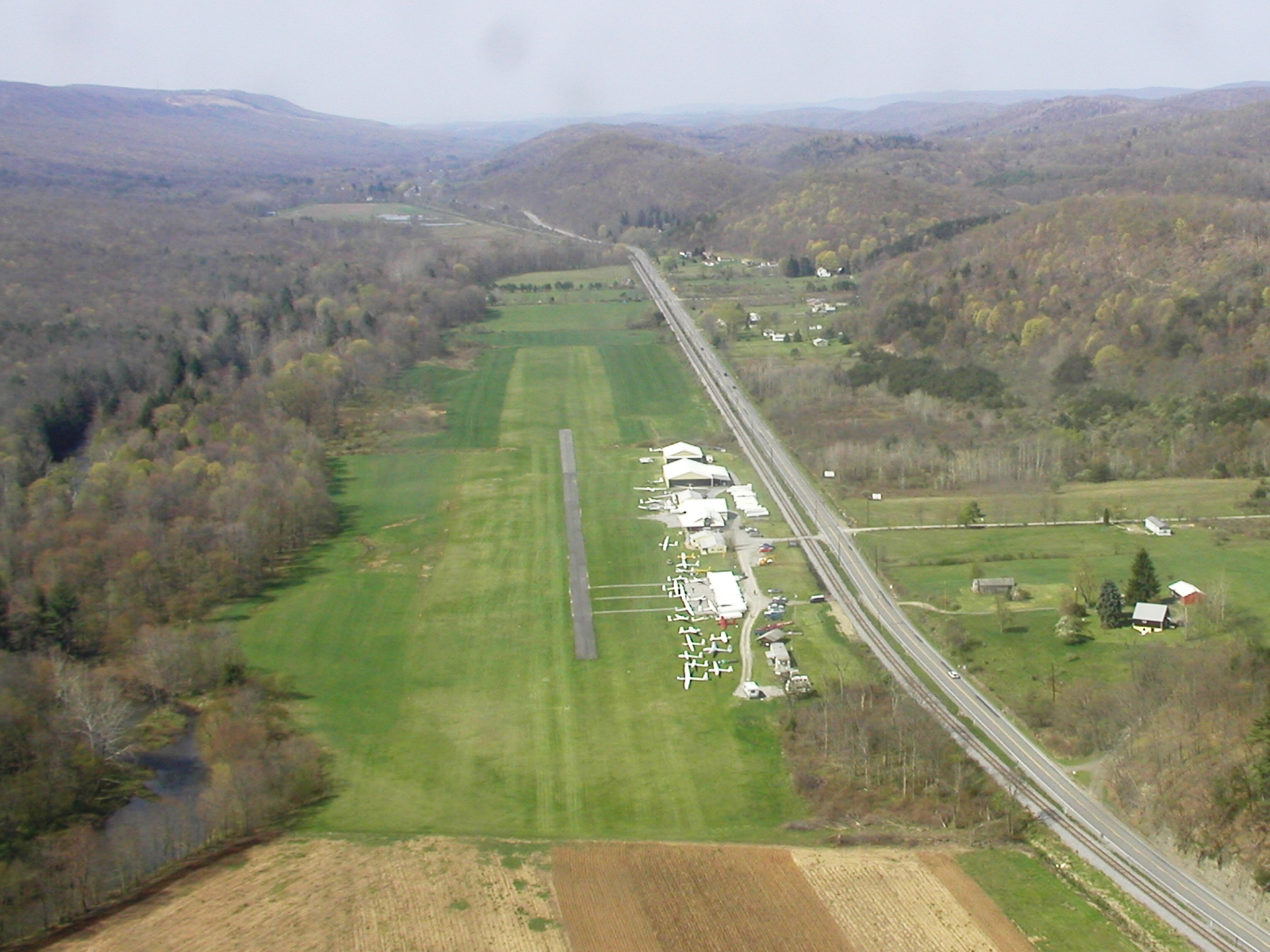
The Ridge Soaring Gliderport in the Bald Eagle Valley, looking southwest toward Julian. Bald Eagle Mountain and Bald Eagle Creek are on the left, the Nittany and Bald Eagle Railroad and U.S. Route 220 are in the lower right, and the Allegheny Front is on the top right.

=== Roads ===
U.S. Route 220 Alternate, the main route along the valley, ran along the floodplain, but the main route designation has been relocated to the Nittany Valley north of Port Matilda in conjunction with the ongoing extension of Interstate 99 to Interstate 80. The road north of there is now known as U.S. 220 Alternate. I-80 runs east-west across the valley between Snow Shoe and Bellefonte. U.S. Route 322, Skytop Mountain Road, also crosses the valley through Port Matilda, and across the ridge in a cut at "Skytop". I-99 runs through the upper valley mostly along the ridge, then wraps around Port Matilda to pick up U.S. 322 in a tandem alignment, before crossing the ridge in the now expanded Skytop cut.

=== Canal ===
The Bald Eagle and Spring Creek Navigation Company began building up the Bald Eagle Valley from Lock Haven in 1834. It reached Howard in 1837, but construction stalled, and it only reached Milesburg in 1847 and Bellefonte in 1848. Initially successful, the canal began to face railroad competition during the Civil War, and was not rebuilt after its destruction by flooding in 1865.

=== Rail ===
Construction began in 1858 on Centre County's first railroad, the Bellefonte and Snow Shoe Railroad, which entered the valley through the Spring Creek water gap at Milesburg. By 1862 the line up the Wallace Run side valley, from Wingate to the timber and coal resources of Snow Shoe, was completed. It ran along the stream bed to the foot of the Allegheny Front, then climbed half of the line's 886 feet (270 m) vertical rise via a unique series of switchbacks in a steep box canyon near 40.99°N 77.88°W.

The Pennsylvania Railroad financed the construction of the Bald Eagle Valley Railroad line through the valley, along the floodplain from Tyrone to Lock Haven. When completed in 1865, it used the Bellefonte & Snow Shoe Railroad track between Wingate and Milesburg. The Pennsylvania Railroad bought the Bellefonte & Snow Shoe Railroad in 1881, making its former line the Snow Shoe and Bellefonte branches. The Snow Shoe branch has been abandoned, but the Nittany and Bald Eagle Railroad shortline still runs the lines from Tyrone to Lock Haven and Bellefonte.

=== Air ===
Ridge Soaring Gliderport, the only airport in the valley, is active (except in winter) with pilot training and glider rides. The former Peterson Memorial Airport, near Tyrone, closed in 1976, and was converted to an industrial park.

North of the valley, near Black Moshannon State Park, lies Mid-State Regional Airport, however, it was shut down after the creation of University Park Airport.

== Geology ==
Bald Eagle Valley is in the western part of the Ridge and Valley province of the Appalachian Mountains. During the Appalachian orogeny, sedimentary rock layers on the supercontinent of Pangaea were folded, forming a huge mountain range. The Nittany Arch was an ancient Himalayan-scale mountain that once towered above what is now the adjacent Nittany Valley.

The oldest rock layers from deep within the eroded mountain are now exposed on the east side of the Bald Eagle ridge. Younger rocks from the outer layers of the arch are exposed in the Bald Eagle Valley, with the youngest at the foot of the Allegheny Front. The rock layers in the valley were folded from horizontal to almost vertical, and now read like pages in a geologic history book covering the entire Devonian period. The vertical attitude of the rocks also contributes to the straightness of the valley.

Erosion resistant Silurian Tuscarora Formation quartzite left the Bald Eagle ridge standing above the valley. Bald Eagle Creek runs at the foot of the ridge on a bed of Devonian Hamilton Group shale. Durable Lock Haven Formation mudstone forms a parallel series of steep elongated knolls running west of the floodplain, some almost as high as the ridge. Catskill Formation sandstone underlies a series of lower gently rolling hills at the foot of the plateau, which is in turn formed from uplifted Mississippian Sandstone.
