= Beech Creek Railroad =

Defunct railroad in Pennsylvania

Overview
- Parent company: New York Central and Hudson River Railroad (1890–1914); New York Central Railroad (1914–1968); Penn Central Transportation (1968–1976)
- Dates of operation: 1882–1976
- Successor: Conrail

Technical
- Track gauge: 1,435 mm (4 ft 8 1/2 in)
- Length: 164 miles (264 km)

The Beech Creek Railroad is a defunct railroad which operated in central Pennsylvania between Jersey Shore and Mahaffey. Originally chartered in 1882, it was leased by the New York Central and Hudson River Railroad (later the New York Central Railroad) in 1890 and was directly operated by that company afterwards. Much of the line was abandoned in the second half of the 20th century, though sections at both ends are still active.

== Origins and construction ==
The company was originally chartered as the Susquehanna and South Western Railroad on August 12, 1882. That company's charter called for a 100-mile (160 km) line from Williamsport, Pennsylvania to the southern line of Clearfield County. The proposed line was initiated with the backing of the New York Central Railroad, as part of a far-reaching strategy to ensure access to bituminous coal reserves. The New York Central did not itself extend into the bituminous coalfields, making it vulnerable to action both by the coal operators who mined the coal and rivals like the Pennsylvania Railroad, who carried it. The coal operators of Tioga County, Pennsylvania, some of whom already shipped over the New York Central via the Fall Brook Coal Company's railroad system, faced irrepressible labor troubles and the impending exhaustion of their mines. William H. Vanderbilt, president of the New York Central, responded to the challenge by developing a plan to enter the Clearfield Coalfield, hitherto the exclusive preserve of the Pennsylvania Railroad. The Vanderbilts would provide capital to a syndicate of Tioga coal operators and businessmen of the Clearfield area, incorporated as the Clearfield Bituminous Coal Company, who could acquire coal lands without arousing suspicion. The Fall Brook's rail network, extended down Pine Creek by a paper railroad called the Jersey Shore, Pine Creek and Buffalo Railway, would bring the New York Central's trains to Jersey Shore, on the West Branch Susquehanna River to the west of Williamsport. From there, the Susquehanna and South Western would head west by way of Beech Creek and Moshannon Creek to the vicinity of Clearfield.

The initial incorporators of the railroad were William A. Wallace, B. L. Wallace, Israel Test, and E. H. Bigler, of Clearfield, S. R. Peale and William H. Brown of Lock Haven, John G. Reading and Joseph M. Gazzam, of Philadelphia. Gazzam was William Wallace's law partner; Reading, a wealthy banker, was Gazzam's father-in-law. William Wallace was appointed president. The railroad selected Samuel Brugger as its locating engineer: an experienced civil engineer, he had recently surveyed part of the same route on behalf of the Pennsylvania and Western Railroad, an independent vehicle of New York speculators which did not succeed in laying track. This allowed him to quickly complete his survey, which was approved by the board in September 1882.

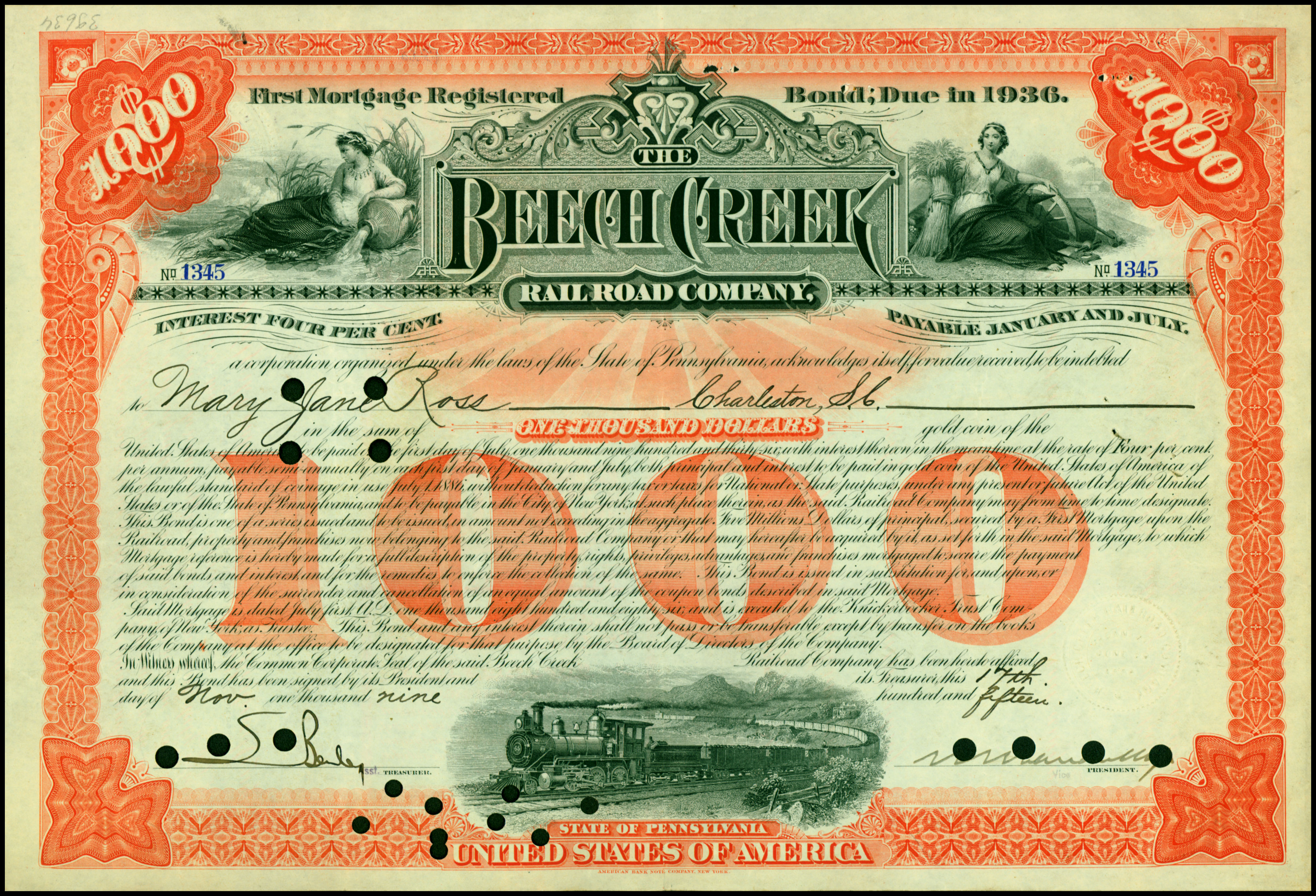
Bond of the Beech Creek Railroad Company, issued 17. November 1915

The Pennsylvania Railroad did relatively little to block the construction of the Susquehanna and South Western. The failed Pennsylvania and Western had induced the Pennsylvania to charter the Lock Haven and Clearfield Railroad in 1879, which would have built from their Bald Eagle Valley Railroad at the mouth of Beech Creek to their Tyrone and Clearfield Railroad at Philipsburg, the same route that the Susquehanna and South Western would take, but never initiated construction. The Pennsylvania may have been influenced by a report from one of their civil engineers, Camille d'Invilliers, prepared in December 1883, which suggested that the Moshannon seam was being exhausted in the older collieries in the Philipsburg and Houtzdale area. Coal from the Moshannon seam enjoyed a high reputation, and d'Invilliers suggested that the Pennsylvania should concentrate on new fields exploiting the Moshannon seam, in the upper Moshannon Valley and elsewhere, and allow the New York Central to compete for the lower seams of Kittanning coal remaining in the Philipsburg area. The only known surviving copy of his report is in the archives of the Fall Brook Coal Company; this company was an ally of the New York Central in penetrating the coalfield, suggesting that the Pennsylvania and New York Central came to an understanding to allow the Beech Creek's construction.

The Susquehanna and South Western financed its construction with the issue of $4,000,000 in stock. Nearly all of the initial issue was purchased by William Wallace, Peale, and Reading, but these purchases were financed by the Vanderbilts and George Magee of the Fall Brook Coal Company, to whom most of that stock was then transferred starting in January 1883.

Construction began at the end of 1882, starting at the town of Beech Creek and proceeding west along the creek to Mountaintop, in the vicinity of Snow Shoe. The company changed its name to the Beech Creek, Clearfield, and South Western Railroad on March 20, 1883. Around this time, it increased the stock issue to $5,000,000 and issued an additional $5,000,000 in fifty-year bonds. The Clearfield Bituminous Coal Company signed a contract to ship exclusively over the new railroad, and George Magee was appointed general contractor for construction. The new line was built to high standards in anticipation of heavy coal traffic. It eschewed severe grades, at the cost of extensive curvature and bridges as it followed Beech Creek, and the 347 feet (106 m) Hogback tunnel, which cut across a loop of the creek, about halfway up the climb out of the watershed at Hurxthal's Summit. Tracklaying began in September 1883. In the meantime, construction began on the 1,277 feet (389.2 m) Peale tunnel 8 miles (10 km) west of the summit, on the descent approaching Moshannon Creek. Undertaken by the well-known railroad contractors P & T Collins, tunneling began on June 24, 1883, and the bore was holed through on October 30. It was ready for rail traffic by the middle of the next year. 2 miles (3 km) further west, the line crossed the creek on an iron viaduct 112 feet (34.1 m) high, opened for service on November 11, 1884.

== NYC subsidiary ==
The company failed and was sold to the newly organized Beech Creek Railroad on June 29, 1886. The New York Central and Hudson River Railroad officially leased the company on December 15, 1890, backdated to October 1. The New York Central merged the Cambria County Railroad into the Beech Creek Railroad on May 11, 1898.

An April 29, 1951 a New York Central Timetable listed the line as the "Pennsylvania Division" while an October 30, 1960 Timetable listed it as the "Syracuse Division."

== Works cited ==
- Bezilla, Mike (2017). Branch Line Empires. Bloomington, Indiana: Indiana University Press. ISBN 978-0-253-02958-4.
- Taber, Thomas T. III (1987). Railroads of Pennsylvania Encyclopedia and Atlas. Thomas T. Taber III. ISBN 0-9603398-5-X.
