= Woapalanne =

Chief Woapalanne (died June 1779) — also known as Chief Bald Eagle (his name in English) — was a Lenape tribal leader active in central and western Pennsylvania. In his later years, he was said to have frequently traveled to the distant hunting lands of the Monongahela River watershed. He belonged to the Munsee (Wolf) subtribe of the Lenape.

== Biography ==
During the American Revolutionary War (1775-1783), Woapalanne led war parties from Bald Eagle's Nest (present day Milesburg, Centre County, Pennsylvania) against white settlements in the West Branch Susquehanna Valley. He reputedly killed James Brady near Williamsport in 1778. He was himself killed in June 1779 by James' elder brother Sam, near Brady's Bend in present Clarion County, Pennsylvania.

Another, very different, version of Woapalanne's death is described in Alexander Scott Withers' Chronicles of Border Warfare (1831):

The Bald Eagle was an Indian of notoriety, not only among his own nation, but also with the inhabitants of the North Western frontier; with whom he was in the habit of associating and hunting. In one of his visits among them, he was discovered alone by Jacob Scott, William Hacker and Elijah Runner, who, reckless of the consequences murdered him, solely to gratify a most wanton thirst for Indian blood. After the commission of this most outrageous enormity, they seated him in the stern of a canoe, and with a piece of journey-cake thrust into his mouth, set him afloat in the Monongahela. In this situation he was seen descending the river, by several, who supposed him to be as usual, returning from a friendly hunt with the whites in the upper settlements, and who expressed some astonishment that he did not stop to see them. The canoe floating near to the shore below the mouth of George's creek, was observed by a Mrs. Province, who had it brought to the bank, and the friendly, but unfortunate old Indian decently buried.

== Legacy ==
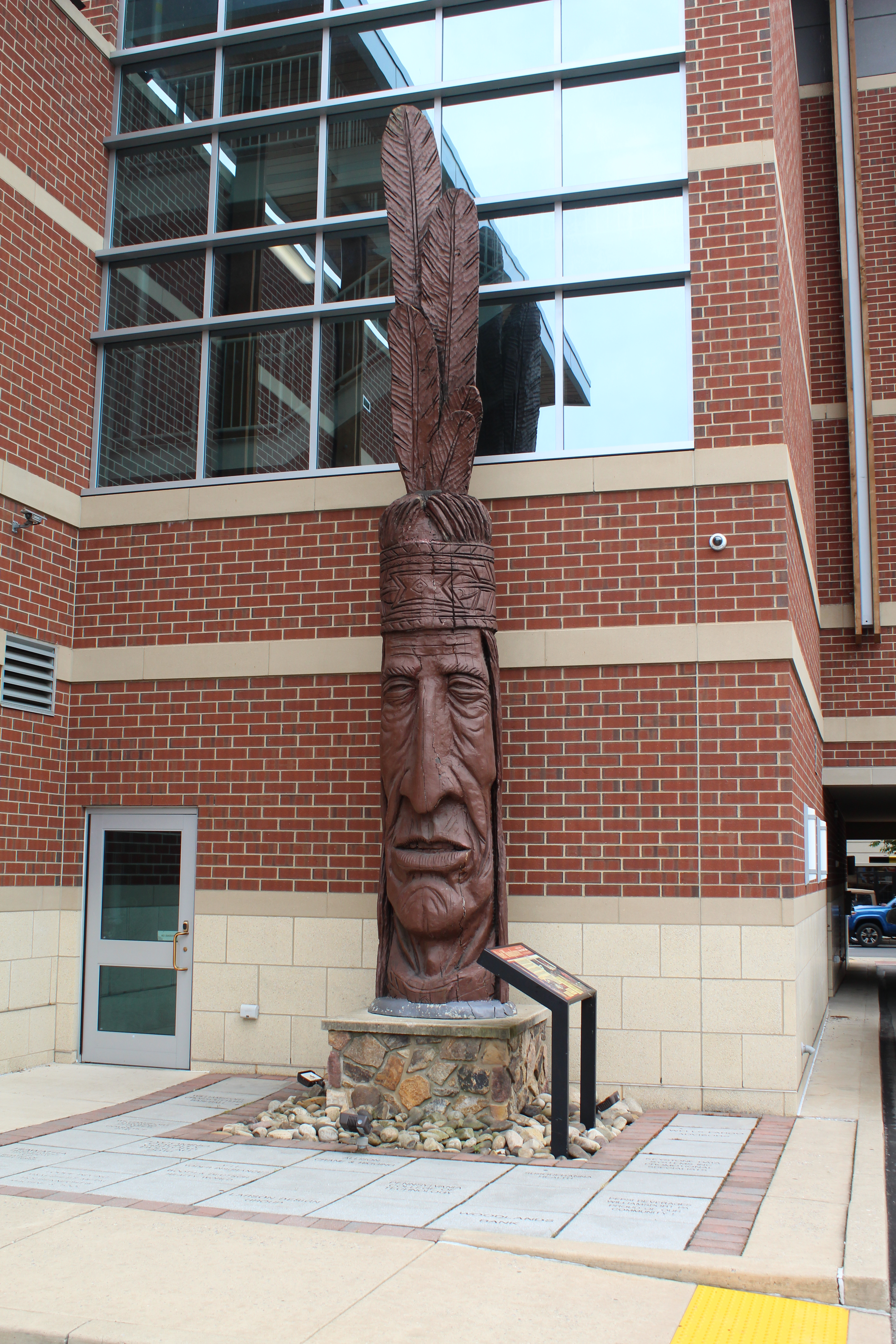
Monument to Woapalanne by Peter Wolf Toth, restored in 2019 and relocated near the downtown Trade & Transit Centre.

- At the entrance of Brandon Park in Williamsport, Pennsylvania is a wooden monument to Woapalanne carved in 1990 by sculptor Peter Wolf Toth.
- Namesakes:
  - Bald Eagle's Nest (now Milesburg, Pennsylvania)
  - Bald Eagle Creeks:
    - Bald Eagle Creek (Little Juniata River), Blair County, Pennsylvania
    - Bald Eagle Creek (West Branch Susquehanna River), Centre County, Pennsylvania
  - Bald Eagle Mountain
  - Bald Eagle State Park, Centre County, Pennsylvania
  - Bald Eagle Township, Pennsylvania
  - Bald Eagle Valley, Centre and Clinton Counties, Pennsylvania
  - Nittany and Bald Eagle Railroad

== See also ==
- Woapalanne Lodge
