= Bald Eagle Mountain (disambiguation) =

Bald Eagle Mountain is a stratigraphic ridge in central Pennsylvania.

Bald Eagle Mountain may also refer to:

- A mountain in Bucks Lake Wilderness, northeastern California
- A summit in the Pilot Range of Utah and Nevada
- A mountain in Deer Valley, Summit County, Utah

== See also ==
- Bald eagle (disambiguation)
