= Pennsylvania Canal (West Branch Division) =

West Branch Pennsylvania Canal
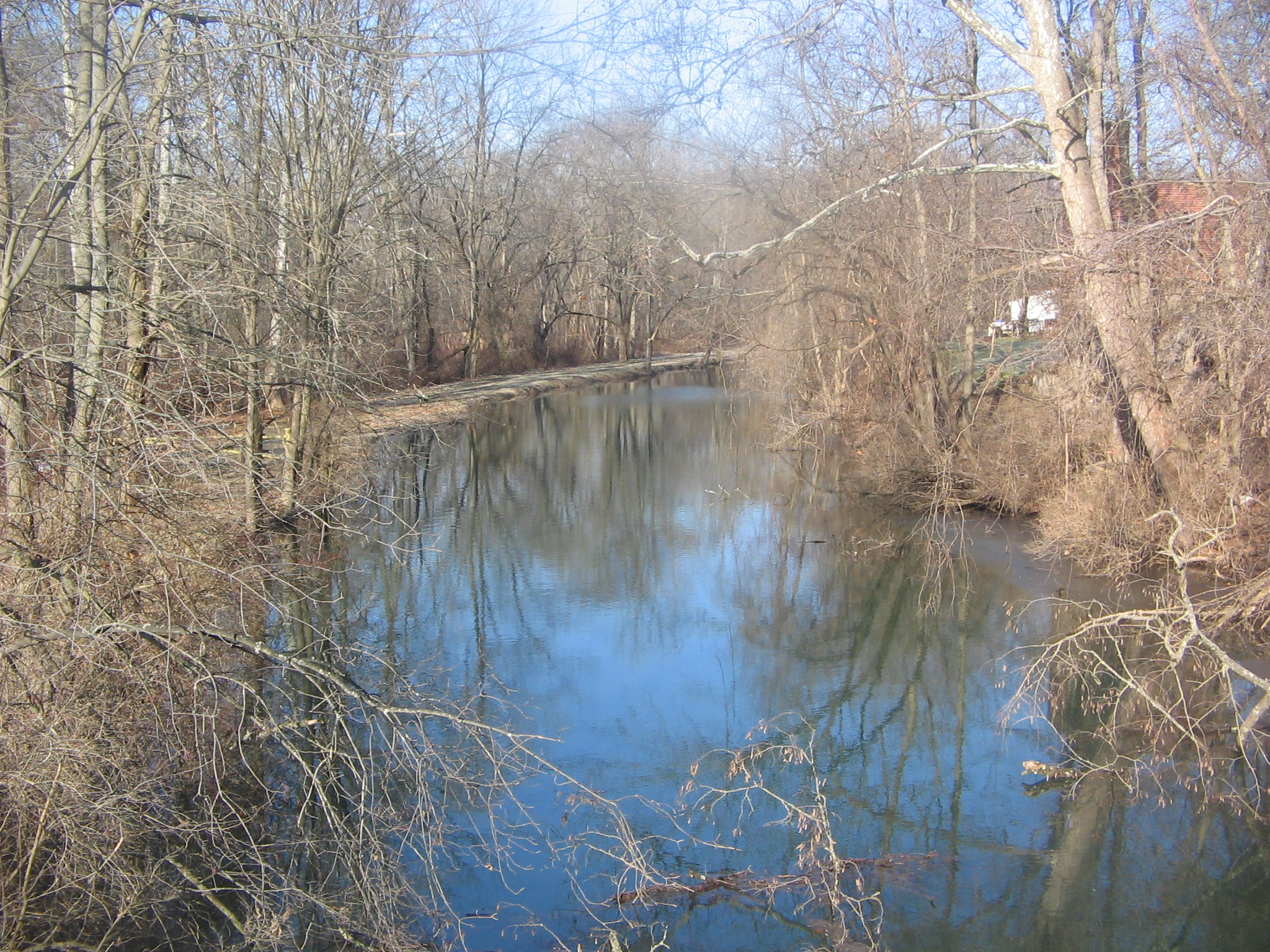
- Bald Eagle Crosscut Canal in Flemington in 2010

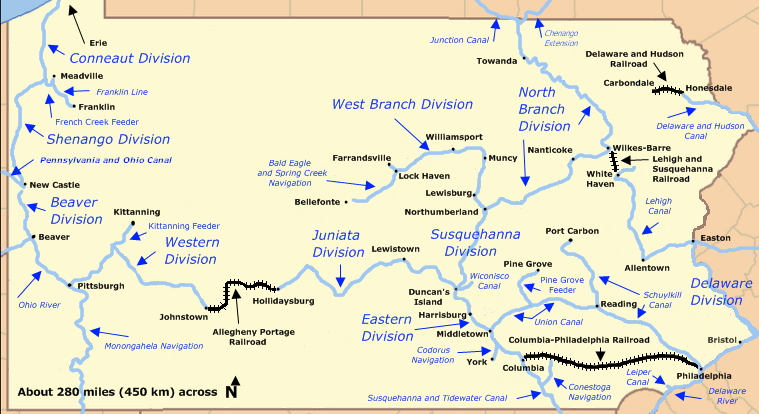
- Map of historic Pennsylvania canals

Location
- Country: United States
- State: Pennsylvania

Physical characteristics
- Source: West Branch Susquehanna River
  - location: Farrandsville, Clinton County
  - coordinates: 41°10′12″N 77°30′57″W (Note: These are the coordinates for the mouth of Lick Run below Farrandsville, near the north end of the former canal.)
  - elevation: 558 ft (170 m)
- Mouth: Susquehanna River
  - location: Northumberland, Northumberland County
  - coordinates: 40°52′55″N 76°47′51″W (Note: These are the coordinates for the mouth of the West Branch Susquehanna River at Northumberland, where the West Branch, North Branch, and Susquehanna Division canals connected.)
  - elevation: 420 ft (130 m)
- Length: 73 mi (117 km)

Basin features
- River system: Pennsylvania Canal
- Original owner: Commonwealth of Pennsylvania

The West Branch Division of the Pennsylvania Canal ran 73 miles (117 km) from the canal basin at Northumberland, Pennsylvania, at the confluence of the West Branch Susquehanna River with the main stem of the Susquehanna River, north through Muncy, then west through Williamsport, Jersey Shore, and Lock Haven to its terminus in Farrandsville. At its southern terminus in the Northumberland basin, the West Branch Canal met the North Branch Canal and the Susquehanna Division Canal. Through these connections to other divisions of the Pennsylvania Canal, it formed part of a multi-state water transportation system including the Main Line of Public Works.

Between Northumberland and Muncy, the canal lay east of the river. Beyond Muncy, where the river makes a right-angle turn, the canal lay to the north. Started in 1828 and completed in 1835, it had 19 lift locks overcoming a total vertical rise of about 140 feet (43 m). The locks, beginning with No. 13, slightly upstream of the Northumberland Canal Basin, and ending with No. 34 at Lockport, across the river from Lock Haven, included two guard locks and an outlet lock in addition to the 19 lift locks.

The state intended to extend the West Branch Canal from Farrandsville further upstream along the West Branch Susquehanna River to the mouth of Sinnemahoning Creek. Plans called for 33 miles (53 km) of canal, but the project was abandoned along with the idea that the West Branch Canal would eventually connect to the Allegheny River in western Pennsylvania.

== Extensions ==
Additions to the West Branch Canal included the Bald Eagle Crosscut Canal, which ran 4 miles (6.4 km) through Lock Haven and Flemington along Bald Eagle Creek. It linked the West Branch Canal to a privately financed addition, the Bald Eagle and Spring Creek Navigation, that extended the canal system another 22 miles (35 km) to Bellefonte along Bald Eagle and Spring creeks. Beginning in 1837, large quantities of pig iron and bituminous coal traveled to distant markets via these canals.

The Lock Haven Dam (also known as the Dunnstown Dam), was built in the 19th century primarily to provide water to the West Branch Canal. Canal boats crossed the pool behind the dam using a cable ferry between Lock No. 35 on the Lock Haven (Bald Eagle Crosscut Canal) side of the river and Lock No. 34 on the Lockport (West Branch Canal) side, about 2,000 feet (610 m) downriver from the Jay Street Bridge.

In 1833, the state added a 0.75-mile (1.21 km) canal, the Lewisburg Cut, to connect the town of Lewisburg, 11 miles (18 km) north of Northumberland, to the system. The privately financed Muncy Cut, also only 0.75 miles (1.21 km) long, added a branch canal into Muncy, 20 miles (32 km) north of Northumberland.

== Locks ==
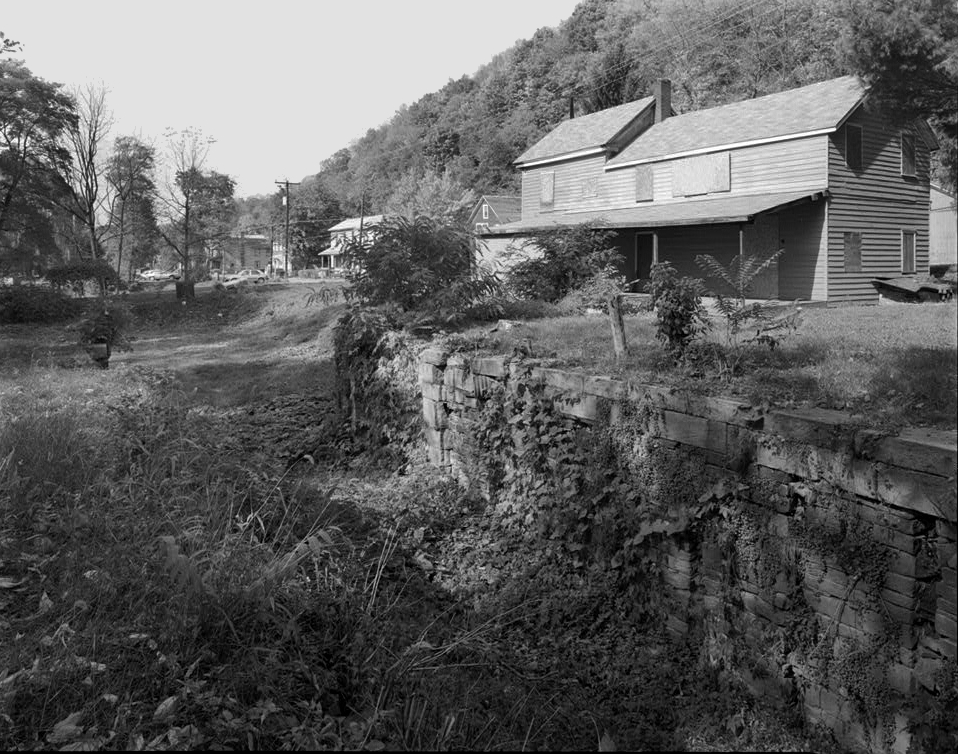
Lock No. 34 and lock keeper's house at Lockport

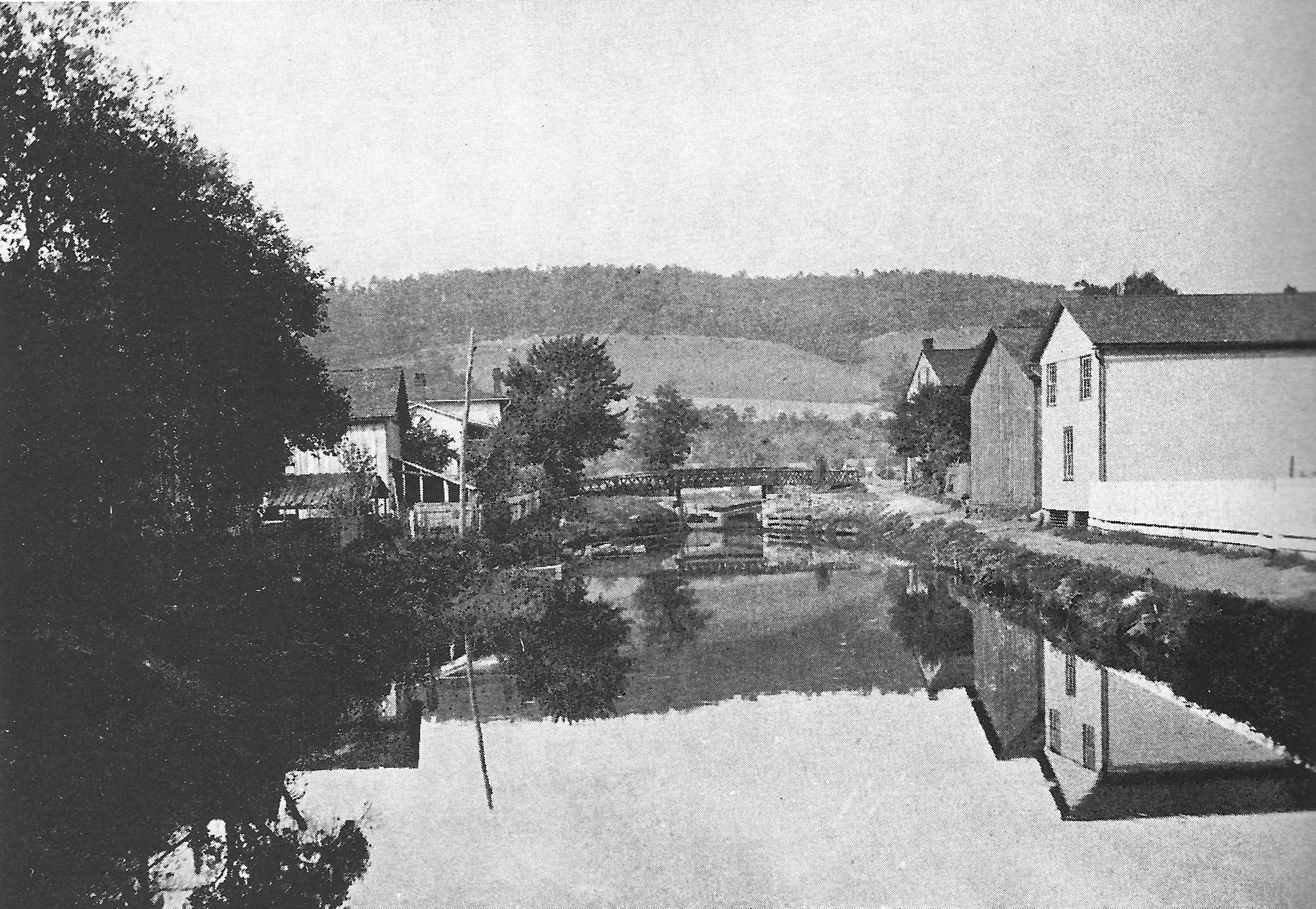
Bald Eagle Crosscut Canal in Lock Haven, 1898 or earlier. View is to the north from Main Street.

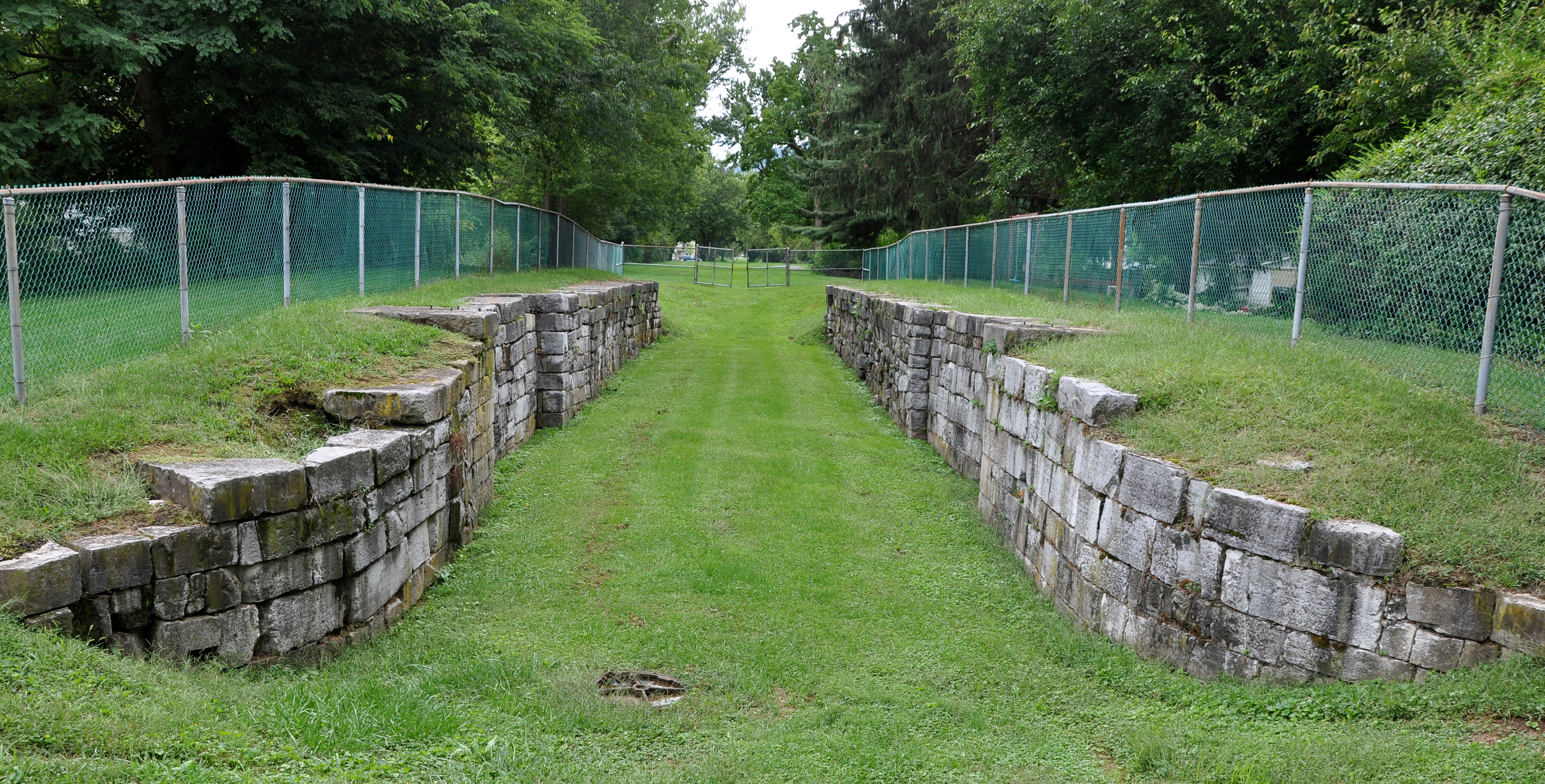
Lock No. 32 in Jersey Shore in 2012. The lock remnants are in a public space bounded by Cemetery, Locust, and South Broad streets and Cherry Alley.

No. (Note: The numbering system for the Susquehanna and West Branch divisions of the Pennsylvania Canal started at Duncan Island, where the Eastern, Juniata, and Susquehanna divisions connected. The Susquehanna Division ran north–south through 12 locks along the Susquehanna River between Duncan Island and Northumberland. The first lock on the West Branch Canal was No. 13.)	Lift	Canal mile (km)	Remarks
—	0	0.0 miles 0.0 km	Northumberland Canal Basin
13	7.75 feet (2.36 m)	0.6 miles (1.0 km)	—
14	5.94 feet (1.81 m)	6.5 miles (10.5 km)	—
15	?	8.0 miles (12.9 km)	Lewisburg Cut outlet
16	0	8.2 miles (13.2 km)	Guard lock near Lewisburg Dam
17	6.12 feet (1.87 m)	10.2 miles (16.4 km)	Milton including Limestone Run Aqueduct
18	5.2 feet (1.6 m)	14.6 miles (23.5 km)	Watsontown
19	7.2 feet (2.2 m)	22 miles (35 km)	Montgomery
20	5.4 feet (1.6 m)	22.9 miles (36.9 km)	Muncy Dam Lock
21	5.5 feet (1.7 m)	24.0 miles (38.6 km)	—
22	5.5 feet (1.7 m)	26.2 miles (42.2 km)	Muncy (Note: The Muncy Cut branched off the main canal 27.5 miles (44.3 km) upstream of the Northumberland Basin.)
23	6.5 feet (2.0 m)	28.8 miles (46.3 km)	Wash Taylor's Locks
24	5.07 feet (1.55 m)	29 miles (47 km)	Near Hall's Station
25	6.12 feet (1.87 m)	33.2 miles (53.4 km)	Joe Phillips Lock
26	4.83 feet (1.47 m)	35.4 miles (57.0 km)	Head of White Water
27	6.3 feet (1.9 m)	36.2 miles (58.3 km)	Montoursville
28	?	41.2 miles (66.3 km)	East of Lycoming Creek aqueduct
29	?	50.2 miles (80.8 km)	Near Thomas Smith tract
30	?	51.7 miles (83.2 km)	Wild Man's Lock
31	?	53.9 miles (86.7 km)	Larry's Creek
32	?	56.4 miles (90.8 km)	Jersey Shore
33	0	66.4 miles (106.9 km)	Guard lock below Lock Haven Dam
34	?	68.4 miles (110.1 km)	Lockport (Note: The West Branch Canal connected with the Bald Eagle Crosscut Canal via the dam pool between Lockport and Lock Haven.)
—	0	73.4 miles (118.1 km)	Terminus at Farrandsville

== Remnants ==
Remnants of the canal exist along the West Branch Susquehanna River between Northumberland and Lock Haven. Canal walls made of stone still stand near Muncy, while other canal and lock remnants are preserved near Lock Haven. Archaeological work and restoration began in 2005 at the Muncy Canal Heritage Park and Nature Trail, 11 acres (4.5 ha) including remains of a towpath, a lock, a canal wall, and a lock tender's house. Part of the Bald Eagle Crosscut Canal still flows along Bald Eagle Creek through Flemington. Lock No. 32 has been preserved in Jersey Shore.

== Points of interest ==
Feature	Coordinates	Description
Farrandsville	41°10′30″N 77°30′45″W	Populated place at the northern terminus
Williamsport	41°14′40″N 77°01′15″W	City near the midpoint of the canal
Northumberland	40°53′30″N 76°47′51″W	Town at the southern terminus

== See also ==
- List of canals in the United States

== Notes and references ==
Notes

== Works cited ==
- McCullough, Robert, and Leuba, Walter (1973) [1962]. The Pennsylvania Main Line Canal. York, Pennsylvania: The American Canal and Transportation Center. OCLC 731554
- Shank, William H. (1986) [1981]. The Amazing Pennsylvania Canals (150th Anniversary Edition). York, Pennsylvania: The American Canal and Transportation Center. ISBN 0-933788-37-1.
