= Gum Stump, Pennsylvania =

Unincorporated community in Pennsylvania, US

- Unincorporated community
- Location within the U.S. state of Pennsylvania Gum; Stump (the United States)
- Coordinates: 40°58′49″N 77°50′58″W
- Country: United States
- State: Pennsylvania
- County: Centre
- Township: Boggs
- Elevation: 968 ft (295 m)
- Time zone: UTC-5 (Eastern (EST))
  - Summer (DST): UTC-4 (EDT)
- GNIS feature ID: 1176314

Gum Stump is an unincorporated community in Boggs Township, Centre County, Pennsylvania, United States.

It is located at latitude 40.98°N, longitude 77.85°W, approximately 5 miles (8.0 km) northwest of Bellefonte, the seat of Centre County. Its elevation is approximately 1,100 ft (340 m).

The Bellefonte and Snowshoe Railroad switchbacks are located there. The switchbacks are the inspiration for Chuck Yungkurth's model railroad switchbacks.

Gum Stump is the location of Pennsylvania State Game Lands No. 103, an 8,994-acre (36.40 km^{2}) hunting range maintained by the Pennsylvania Game Commission.
