= Jay Street Bridge =

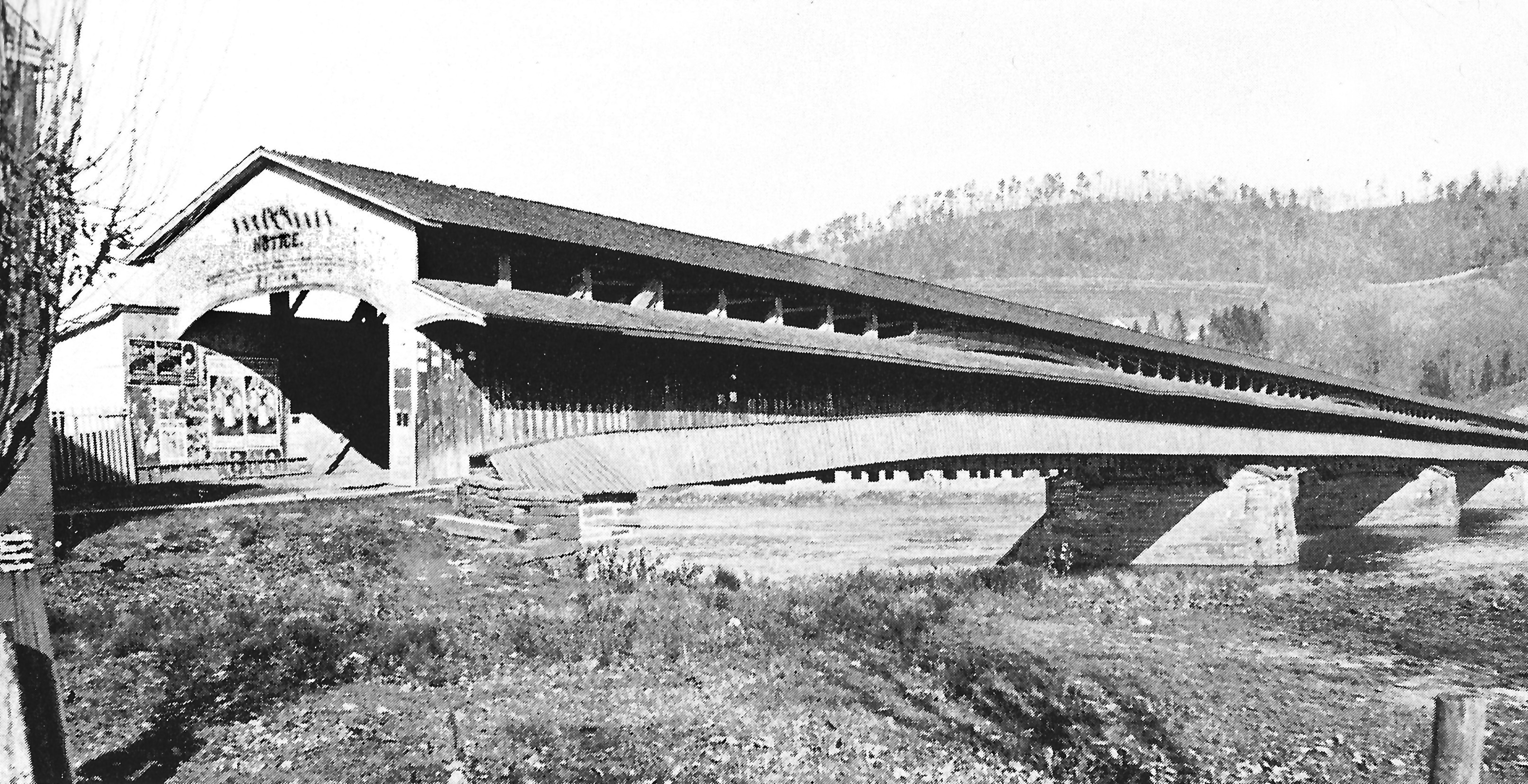
- Looking northwest from the Lock Haven side of the river in the late 19th century
- Coordinates: 41°08′22″N 77°26′30″W
- Carried: PA 664
- Crossed: West Branch Susquehanna River
- Locale: Clinton, Pennsylvania, United States
- Named for: John Jay

Characteristics
- Total length: 800 ft (240 m)

History
- Constructed by: E. Kirkbride and Company
- Construction end: 1852
- Collapsed: by fire in 1919

The Jay Street Bridge crosses the West Branch Susquehanna River between Lock Haven on the south bank and Lockport on the north. The original structure, completed for the Lock Haven Bridge Company by the E. Kirkbride Company in 1852, was a covered bridge about 800 feet (240 m) long. A two-story toll house, 48 feet (15 m) long and 18 feet (5.5 m) wide was later added at the foot of the bridge on the Lock Haven side. Travelers using the bridge passed through an archway in the center of the toll house. The bridge included a covered pedestrian walkway on the downstream side.

After the wooden bridge was destroyed by fire in 1919, it was replaced by an iron bridge, and a steel girder bridge replaced the iron bridge in 1986. State Route 664, the southern terminus of which is in Lock Haven, crosses the river over the steel bridge.

A log raft going under the second, iron Jay Street Bridge, which was replaced in 1986.

The bridge is slightly upstream of Lock Haven's Canal Park, featuring remnants of the Bald Eagle Crosscut Canal. It is also slightly upstream of the Lock Haven Dam (also known as the Dunnstown Dam), built in the 19th century to provide water to the West Branch Canal, which ran parallel to the Lockport and Dunnstown side of the river. Canal boats crossed the pool behind the dam by means of a cable ferry between Lock No. 34, about 2,000 feet (610 m) east of the bridge on the Lockport side, and Lock No. 35 on the Lock Haven side.

The steel bridge is 8.5 metres (28 ft) wide and about 250.5 metres (822 ft) long. It has an operating rating (maximum allowable weight of a vehicle using the bridge) of 60.8 metric tons (67.0 short tons). In 2007, the average daily traffic count for the bridge was 3,646 vehicles.

== See also ==
- List of crossings of the Susquehanna River

== Works cited ==
- Miller, Isabel Winner (1966). Old Town: A History of Early Lock Haven, 1769–1845. Lock Haven: The Annie Halenbake Ross Library. OCLC 7151032.
- Wagner, ed., Dean R. (1979). Historic Lock Haven: An Architectural Survey. Lock Haven: Clinton County Historical Society. OCLC 5216208.
