= Bald Eagle Valley Railroad =

Defunct subsidiary of the Pennsylvania Railroad

Map

The Bald Eagle Valley Railroad was a subsidiary of the Pennsylvania Railroad which owned several rail lines in central Pennsylvania. It had its genesis in the Tyrone and Lock Haven Railroad, a financially troubled railroad chartered in 1857, which was unable to complete more than a small portion of its line before it was reorganized as the Bald Eagle Valley and funded by the PRR in 1861. Completed from Tyrone to Lock Haven in 1865 (a branch to Bellefonte had been built before 1861), it was completely controlled by the PRR and did not operate independently. However, it retained its corporate existence for some time, acquiring branch lines into the Snowshoe coal region and an extension from Bellefonte to Lemont before being merged into the PRR in 1908.

== Tyrone and Lock Haven ==
Tyrone & Lock Haven Railroad
Overview
- Headquarters: Tyrone, Pennsylvania
- Locale: Centre County, Pennsylvania
- Dates of operation: 1859–1861
- Successor: Bald Eagle Valley Railroad

Technical
- Track gauge: 4 ft 8 1/2 in (1,435 mm) standard gauge

The railroad began as the Tyrone and Lock Haven Railroad, incorporated on February 21, 1857 to construct a line the full length of the Bald Eagle Valley, from Tyrone to Lock Haven. A supplement to the charter on May 4, 1857 authorized further extensions, from Tyrone to Hollidaysburg to reach the Allegheny Portage Railroad, and from Lock Haven to Williamsport to reach the Sunbury and Erie Railroad. Shortly thereafter, contracts were placed for the Eastern Division of the line and for a branch from Milesburg to Bellefonte. However, the railroad was short of capital, and an attempt to defraud its contractors was exposed in 1859. It did complete a small portion of line that year, the Bellefonte Branch from Bellefonte to Milesburg and the part of the main line from Milesburg to Wingate (then known as Snow-Shoe Intersection). There it connected with the Bellefonte and Snowshoe Railroad, which would operate the troubled T&LH for the next few years. On either November 27, 1860 or January 29, 1861 (the date is unclear), the T&LH was sold at foreclosure. It was reorganized on March 25, 1861 as the Bald Eagle Valley Railroad, financially supported by the PRR.

== Bald Eagle Valley ==
Bald Eagle Valley Railroad
Overview
- Locale: Central Pennsylvania
- Dates of operation: 1861–1908
- Successor: Pennsylvania Railroad

Technical
- Track gauge: 4 ft 8 1/2 in (1,435 mm) standard gauge

The B&SS continued to operate the line, but the new company, backed by PRR, now had the funds to complete its line. It was completed southward from Wingate to Vail in 1863; there it connected with another PRR subsidiary, the Tyrone and Clearfield Railroad, which bridged the short distance between Tyrone and Vail. The PRR took over operation from the B&SS on January 20, 1863, and formally leased the Bald Eagle Valley on July 1, 1864. In the meantime, construction was also pressing northward from Milesburg, reaching Lock Haven in 1865 and essentially completing the originally planned route of the Tyrone and Lock Haven.

The new line served several purposes for the PRR. Like the Tyrone and Clearfield, it brought coal traffic (mostly from the Snowshoe mines) into Tyrone, but it also tapped the iron furnaces of Bellefonte, and served as an alternate connection between the PRR main line and their Philadelphia and Erie subsidiary at Lock Haven. This represented an important alternate route for east–west traffic. The line from Tyrone to Lock Haven (including a small part of the Tyrone & Clearfield) became the Bald Eagle Branch of the PRR, while the line from Milesburg to Bellefonte became the Bellefonte Branch. While fully under PRR control, the Bald Eagle Valley maintained its corporate existence for some time. The Bellefonte and Snowshoe and Moshannon Railroads were merged into it on April 7, 1881, becoming the Snow-Shoe Branch. Between 1883 and 1885, the Bellefonte, Nittany and Lemont Railroad was built to extend the Bellefonte Branch to Lemont and a connection with the eastern division of the Lewisburg and Tyrone Railroad, which also became part of the branch. The BN&L was also merged into the Bald Eagle Valley on August 1, 1889. Several spurs were built off the Snow-Shoe Branch in 1890 and 1903 by the Bald Eagle Valley before it was merged into the PRR on March 31, 1908.
