= Flemington, Pennsylvania =

Borough in Pennsylvania, US

- Borough
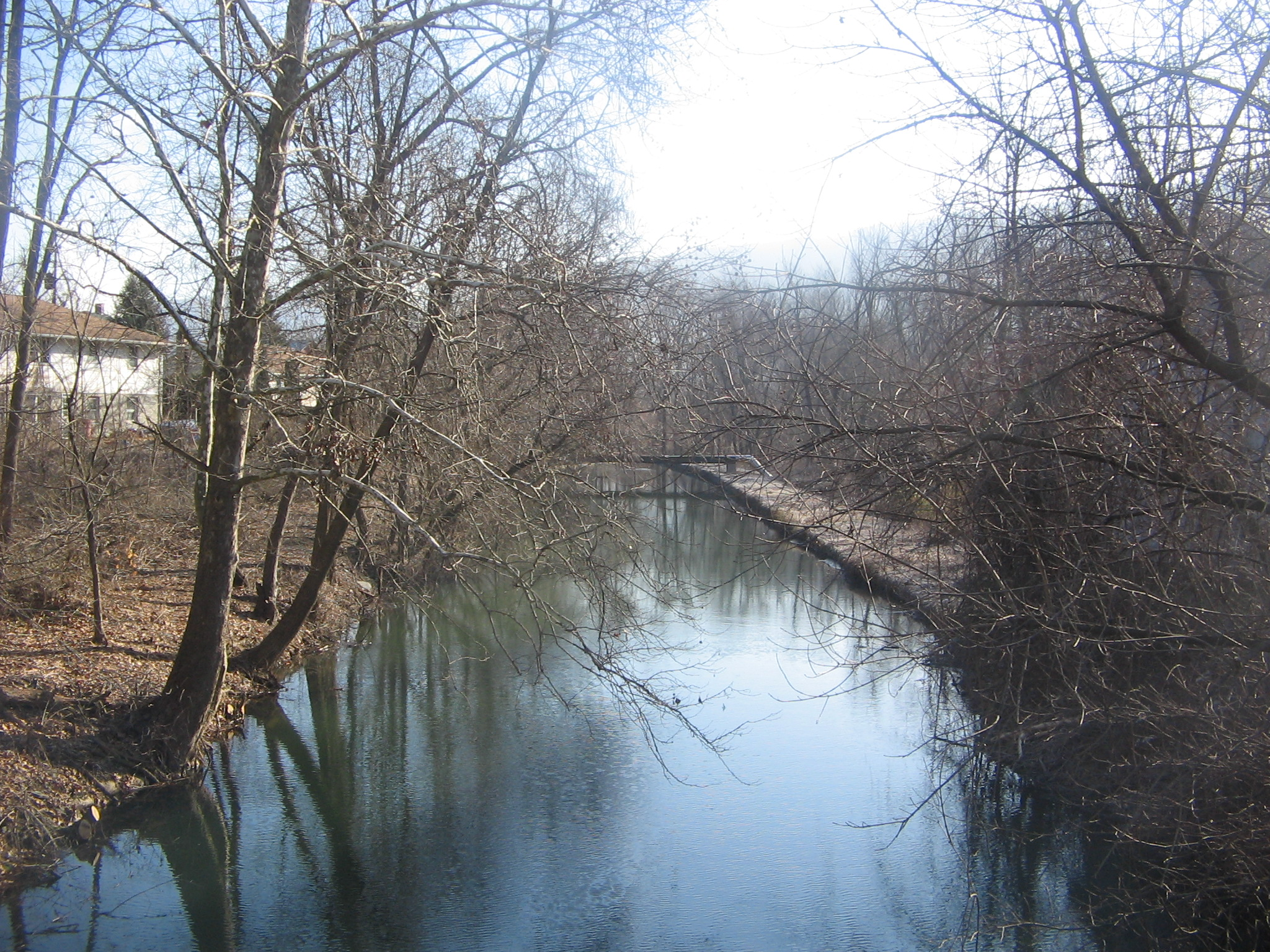
- Remnant of the Bald Eagle Crosscut Canal in Flemington

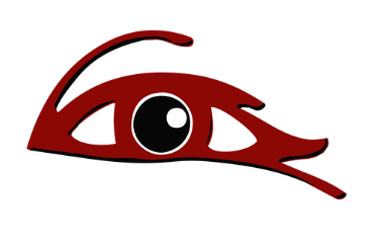
- Logo

- Location in Clinton County and the U.S. state of Pennsylvania.
- Coordinates: 41°07′35″N 77°28′17″W
- Country: United States
- State: Pennsylvania
- County: Clinton
- Settled: 1838
- Incorporated (borough): 1864

Government
  - Type: Borough Council

Area
  - Total: 0.46 sq mi (1.20 km^{2})
  - Land: 0.46 sq mi (1.18 km^{2})
  - Water: 0.0077 sq mi (0.02 km^{2})
- Elevation: 676 ft (206 m)

Population (2020)
  - Total: 1,271
  - Density: 2,786.5/sq mi (1,075.89/km^{2})
- Time zone: Eastern (EST)
  - Summer (DST): EDT
- ZIP code: 17745
- Area code: 570
- FIPS code: 42-26296
- Website: flemingtonboroughpa.org

Flemington (Note: officially the Borough of Flemington, but often called Flemington Borough (even by the government)) is a borough in Clinton County, Pennsylvania, United States. As of the 2020 census, Flemington had a population of 1,271.

In 1770, Squire John Flemming, who later was a Revolutionary War soldier, purchased about 1650 acres situated between Bald Eagle Creek and the West branch of the Susquehanna River encompassing much of present-day Lock Haven and Flemington (named after the family). The Flemings built a large house on the bank of the river close to the southern abutment of a nearby dam and it could be seen from the highway between Flemington and Lock Haven.

The Flemings were descended from the Earl of Wigtown of Scotland, and had their own coat of arms. They were among the first settlers of the area.

== Geography ==
Flemington is located in southern Clinton County at 41°7′34″N 77°28′12″W (41.126246, -77.469943), along Bald Eagle Creek and the remnant of the Bald Eagle Crosscut Canal. It is bordered to the east by the city of Lock Haven, the county seat.

Pennsylvania Route 150 passes through the center of Flemington, leading northeast into Lock Haven and southwest 2 miles (3 km) to Mill Hall.

According to the United States Census Bureau, Flemington has a total area of 0.46 square miles (1.2 km^{2}), of which 0.008 square miles (0.02 km^{2}), or 1.30%, is water.

== Demographics ==
Historical population
Census	Pop.	Note	%±
1890	912		—
1900	864		−5.3%
1910	1,022		18.3%
1920	1,131		10.7%
1930	1,191		5.3%
1940	1,301		9.2%
1950	1,446		11.1%
1960	1,608		11.2%
1970	1,519		−5.5%
1980	1,416		−6.8%
1990	1,321		−6.7%
2000	1,319		−0.2%
2010	1,330		0.8%
2020	1,271		−4.4%

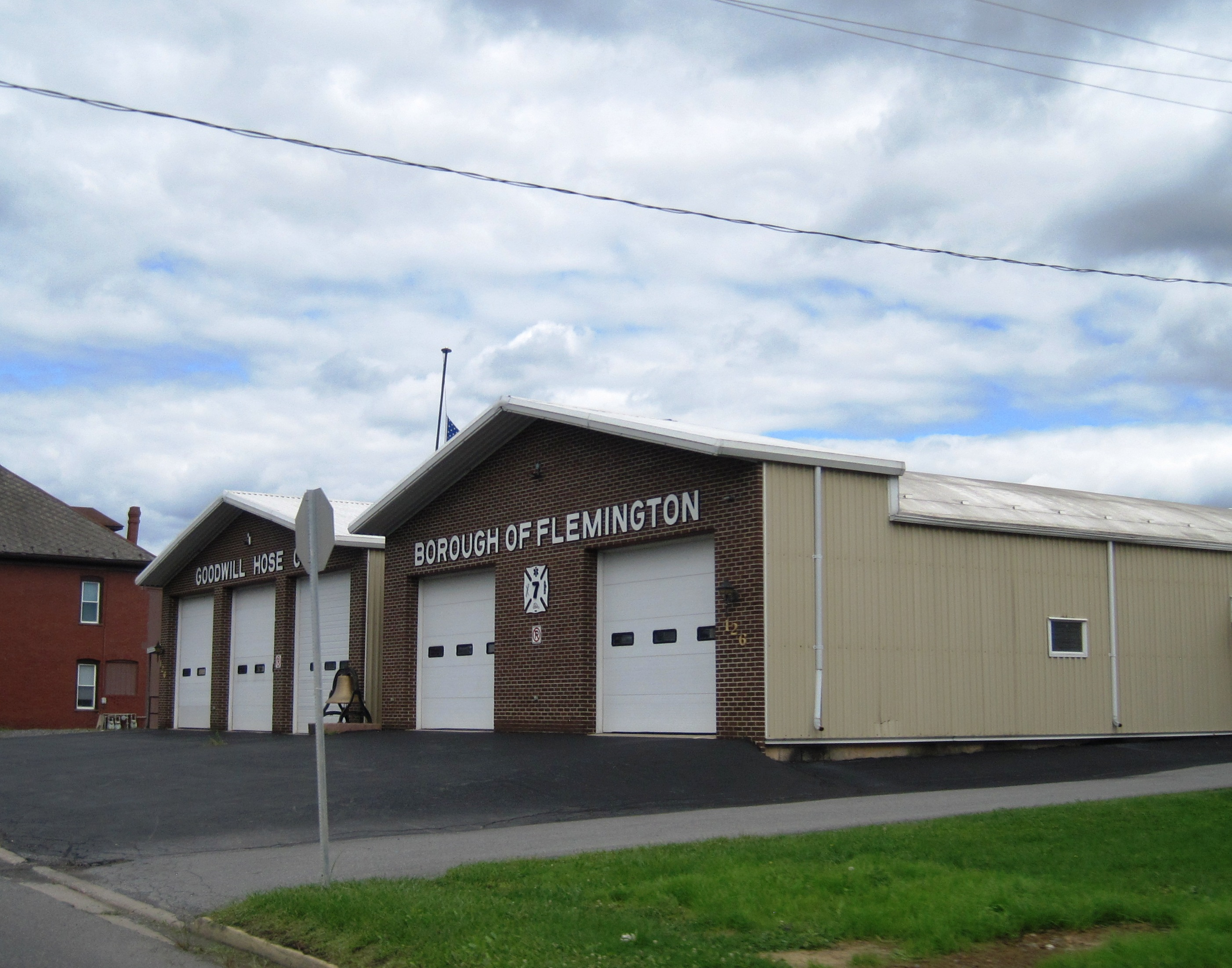
Flemington Borough Hall

As of the census of 2000, there were 1,319 people, 588 households, and 398 families residing in the borough. The population density was 2,951.0 inhabitants per square mile (1,139.4/km^{2}). There were 609 housing units at an average density of 1,362.5 per square mile (526.1/km^{2}). The racial makeup of the borough was 98.94% White, 0.23% African American, 0.08% Native American, 0.45% Asian, and 0.30% from two or more races. Hispanic or Latino of any race were 0.30% of the population.

There were 588 households, out of which 22.4% had children under the age of 18 living with them, 56.5% were married couples living together, 7.7% had a female householder with no husband present, and 32.3% were non-families. 27.7% of all households were made up of individuals, and 17.0% had someone living alone who was 65 years of age or older. The average household size was 2.24 and the average family size was 2.70.

In the borough the population was spread out, with 18.2% under the age of 18, 8.1% from 18 to 24, 26.6% from 25 to 44, 24.9% from 45 to 64, and 22.1% who were 65 years of age or older. The median age was 42 years. For every 100 females, there were 93.4 males. For every 100 females age 18 and over, there were 90.6 males.

The median income for a household in the borough was $29,750, and the median income for a family was $36,776. Males had a median income of $28,333 versus $20,588 for females. The per capita income for the borough was $16,924. About 6.8% of families and 10.0% of the population were below the poverty line, including 13.0% of those under age 18 and 4.7% of those age 65 or over.
