= Tyrone and Clearfield Railroad =

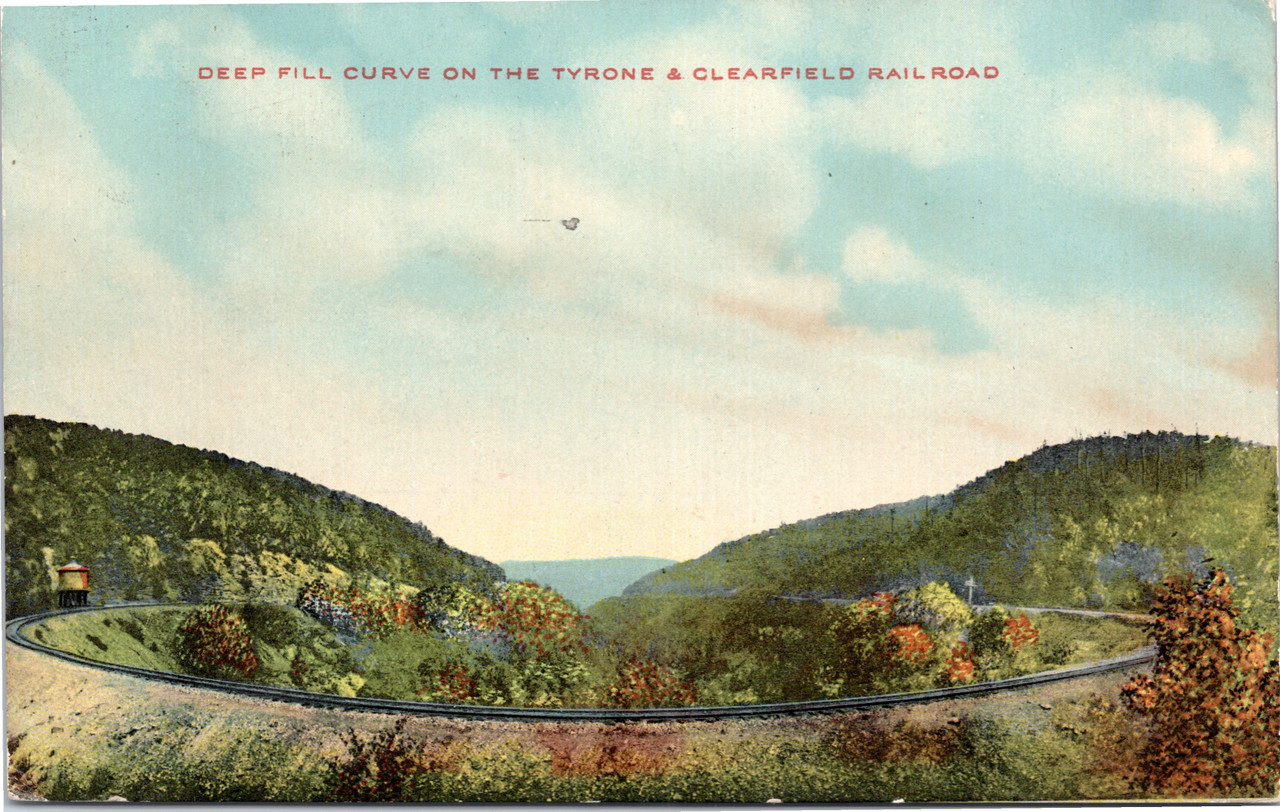
- Postcard of the "Deep Fill" curve

Overview
- Dates of operation: 1854–1867
- Successor: Tyrone and Clearfield Railway

Technical
- Track gauge: 1,435 mm (4 ft 8 1/2 in)
- Length: 28 miles (45 km)

The Tyrone and Clearfield Railroad was a railway company in Pennsylvania. It was incorporated in 1854 and began operation in 1862. The Pennsylvania Railroad leased the company from the beginning of operation. It was reorganized in 1867 as the Tyrone and Clearfield Railway.

== History ==
The company was chartered on March 23, 1854. The backers were from Bellefonte, Pennsylvania, and the owners of a sawmill in Rush Township, on Trout Run, a tributary of Moshannon Creek. The route began in Tyrone, on the main line of the Pennsylvania Railroad. From the Bald Eagle Valley, the line ascended the Allegheny Front to the interior of Centre County, Pennsylvania.

The main line was completed from Tyrone to Sandy Ridge, Pennsylvania, in January 1862, and then to Powelton, a mile and half north of Sandy Ridge, that July. Amid financial difficulties, the Pennsylvania Railroad leased the company on July 2. (Note: Coverdale & Colpitts gives the date of the lease as July 10.) The line was completed to Philipsburg on October 21, 1863.

In addition to its 23.5-mile (37.8 km)-long main line, the company constructed a 4.5-mile (7.2 km) branch from Osceola Mills along Moshannon Creek. This line, later known as the Moshannon Branch, was a major source of online coal traffic.

The Pennsylvania Railroad foreclosed on the company in 1867 and reorganized it as the Tyrone and Clearfield Railway.

== Presidents ==
- James Tracy Hale (1856–1858)
- Andrew Gregg Curtin (1858–1860)
- Reuben Hale (1860–1863)
- George Brooke Roberts (1863–1867)
