= Port Matilda, Pennsylvania =

Borough in Pennsylvania, US

- Borough
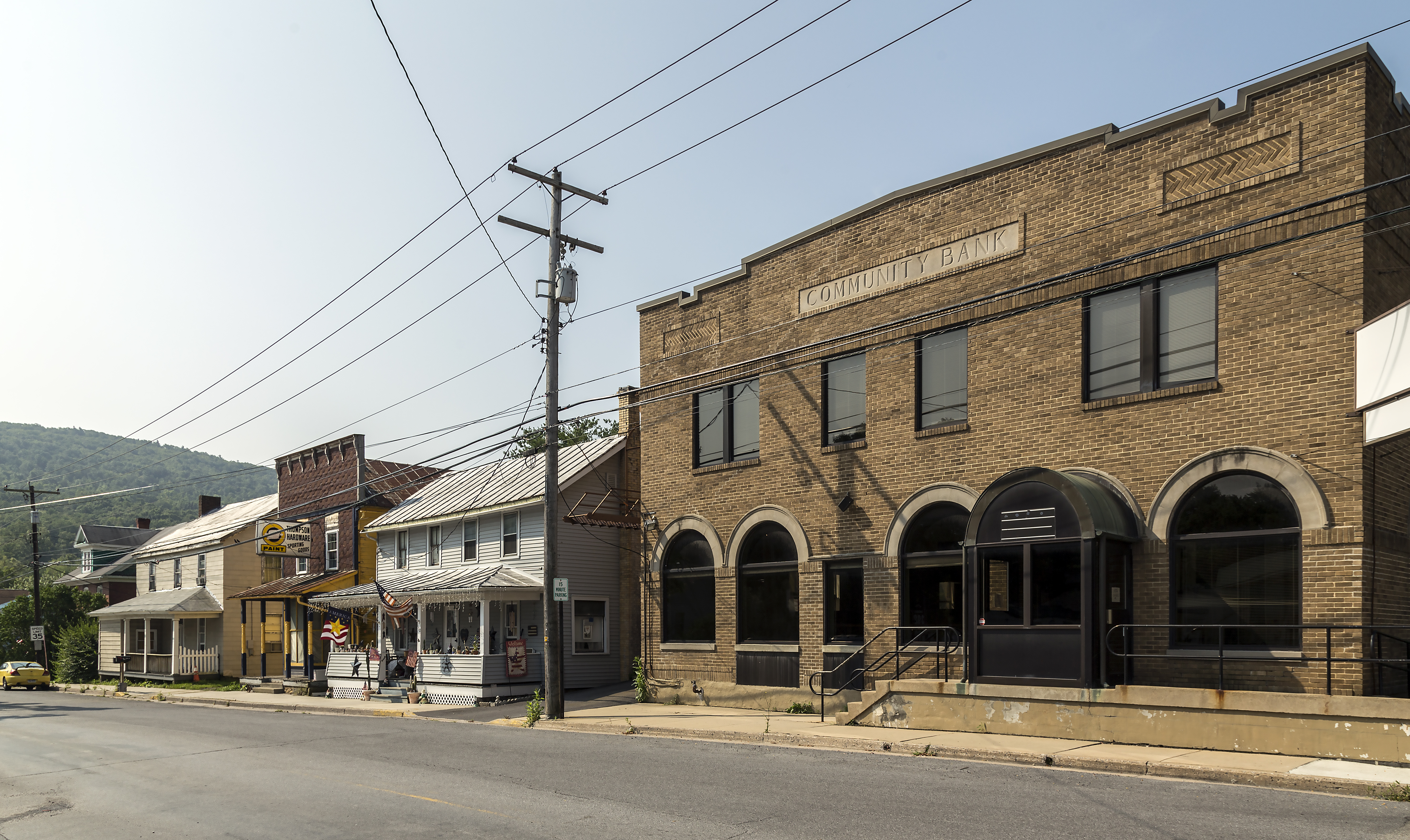
- The center of Port Matilda
- Motto: "The center of the universe"
- Location of Port Matilda in Centre County, Pennsylvania.

- Map showing Centre County in Pennsylvania

- Location within Pennsylvania Location within the United States
- Coordinates: 40°48′00″N 78°03′04″W
- Country: United States
- State: Pennsylvania
- County: Centre
- Settled: 1836
- Incorporated (borough): December 26, 1925

Government
  - Mayor: Greg Harpster
  - Borough Council President: Mark Lively

Area
  - Total: 0.60 sq mi (1.55 km^{2})
  - Land: 0.60 sq mi (1.55 km^{2})
  - Water: 0 sq mi (0.00 km^{2})
- Elevation: 1,053 ft (321 m)

Population (2020)
  - Total: 578
  - Density: 963/sq mi (371.9/km^{2})
- Time zone: Eastern (EST)
  - Summer (DST): EDT
- Zip Code: 16870
- Area code: 814
- FIPS code: 42-62280

Port Matilda is a borough in Centre County, Pennsylvania. It is part of the State College, Pennsylvania metropolitan statistical area. As of the 2020 census, Port Matilda had a population of 578.

== Geography ==
Port Matilda is located at 40°48′0″N 78°3′4″W (40.800056, -78.051119). According to the U.S. Census Bureau, the borough has a total area of 0.6 square miles (1.6 km^{2}), all land.

== Demographics ==
Historical population
Census	Pop.	Note	%±
1880	310		—
1930	508		—
1940	646		27.2%
1950	685		6.0%
1960	697		1.8%
1970	680		−2.4%
1980	647		−4.9%
1990	669		3.4%
2000	638		−4.6%
2010	606		−5.0%
2020	578		−4.6%

At the 2010 census, there were 606 people, 262 households, and 165 families residing in the borough. The population density was 1,110.7 inhabitants per square mile (428.8/km^{2}). There were 289 housing units at an average density of 529.7 per square mile (204.5/km^{2}). The racial makeup of the borough was 98.0% White, 0.1% Black or African American, 0.1% Native American, 0.1% Asian, 0.8% from other races, and 0.8% from two or more races. Hispanic or Latino of any race were 1.2%.

There were 262 households, 26.3% had children under the age of 18 living with them, 47.3% were married couples living together, 4.6% had male householder with no wife present, 11.1% had a female householder with no husband present, and 37.0% were non-families. 30.2% of households were made up of individuals, and 10.7% were one person aged 65 or older. The average household size was 2.31 and the average family size was 2.88.

In the borough, the population was spread out, with 19.5% under the age of 18, 10.1% from 18 to 24, 29.2% from 25 to 44, 28.8% from 45 to 64, and 12.4% 65 or older. The median age was 40 years. For every 100 females there were 103.4 males. For every 100 females age 18 and over, there were 101.7 males.

The median income for a household in the borough was $32,054, and the median family income was $53,750. The per capita income for the borough was $19,418. About 14.5% of families and 20.2% of the population were below the poverty line, including 54.9% of those under age 18 and 3.2% of those age 65 or over.

== History ==
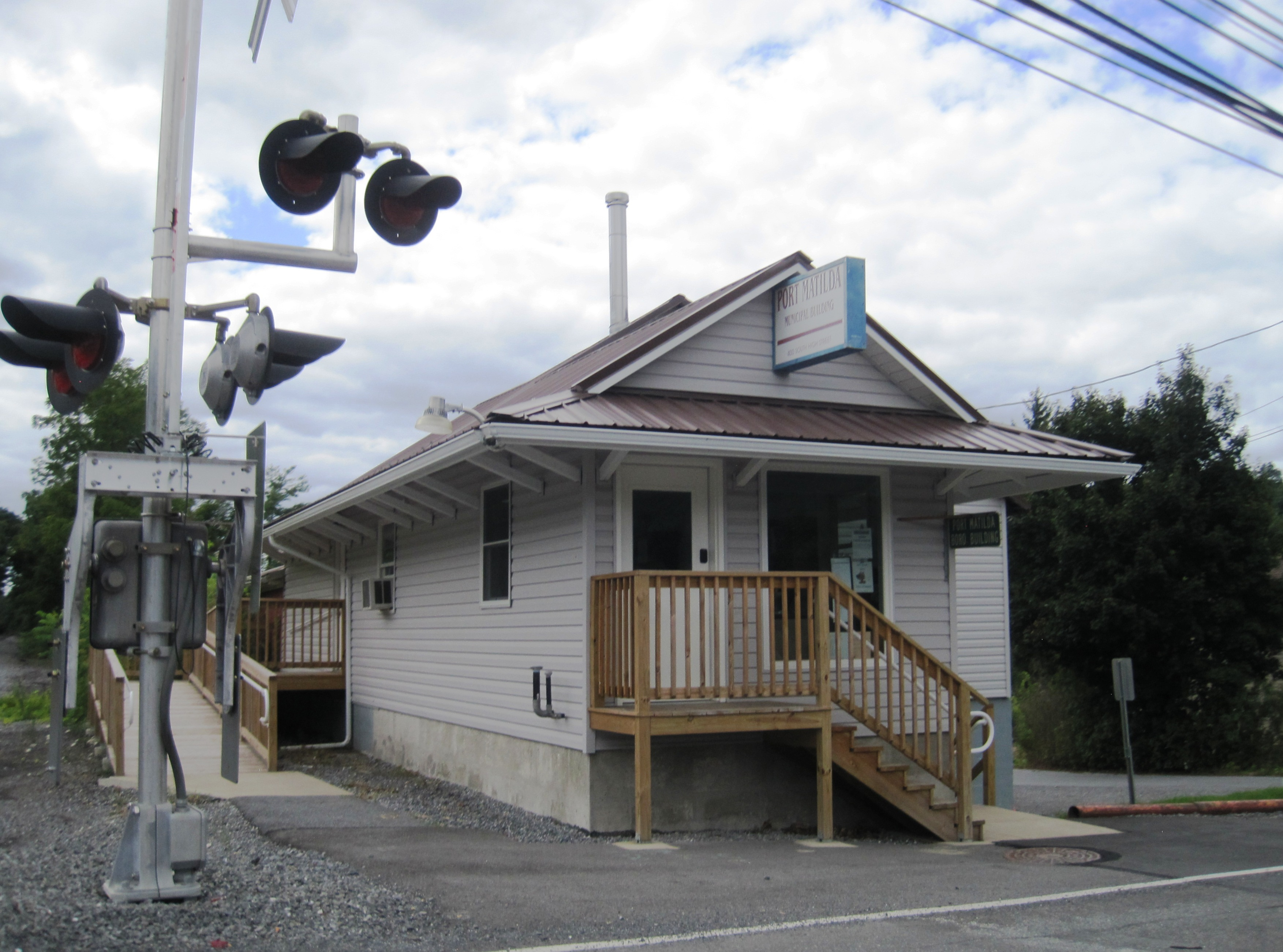
Port Matilda Municipal Building

Squire Clement Beckwith laid out the town in 1850 and named it to honor his daughter, Matilda. Why he chose to call it Port Matilda is not clear, but the name may have reflected his hope that the town would eventually be connected to the Bald Eagle and Spring Creek Branch of the Pennsylvania Canal. While the canal did not reach Port Matilda, the Bald Eagle Railroad did, and the community became a market center in the Bald Eagle Valley for agricultural and lumber products.

=== Industrial history ===
Port Matilda was home to McFeely Brick Co., located on Brick St. at the east end of the town adjacent to the railroad. The company was based in Latrobe, Pennsylvania and founded by Fred McFeely, the grandfather of children's television personality Fred Rogers. The company was later owned by General Refractories, which closed the Port Matilda plant in 1959. Its primary product was silica fire brick made from ganister rock, using beehive kilns. Its bricks were typically stamped "Vulcan".
