= Bald Eagle Creek (West Branch Susquehanna River tributary) =

Tributary river in Pennsylvania, US

Coordinates: 41°08′08″N 77°23′59″W

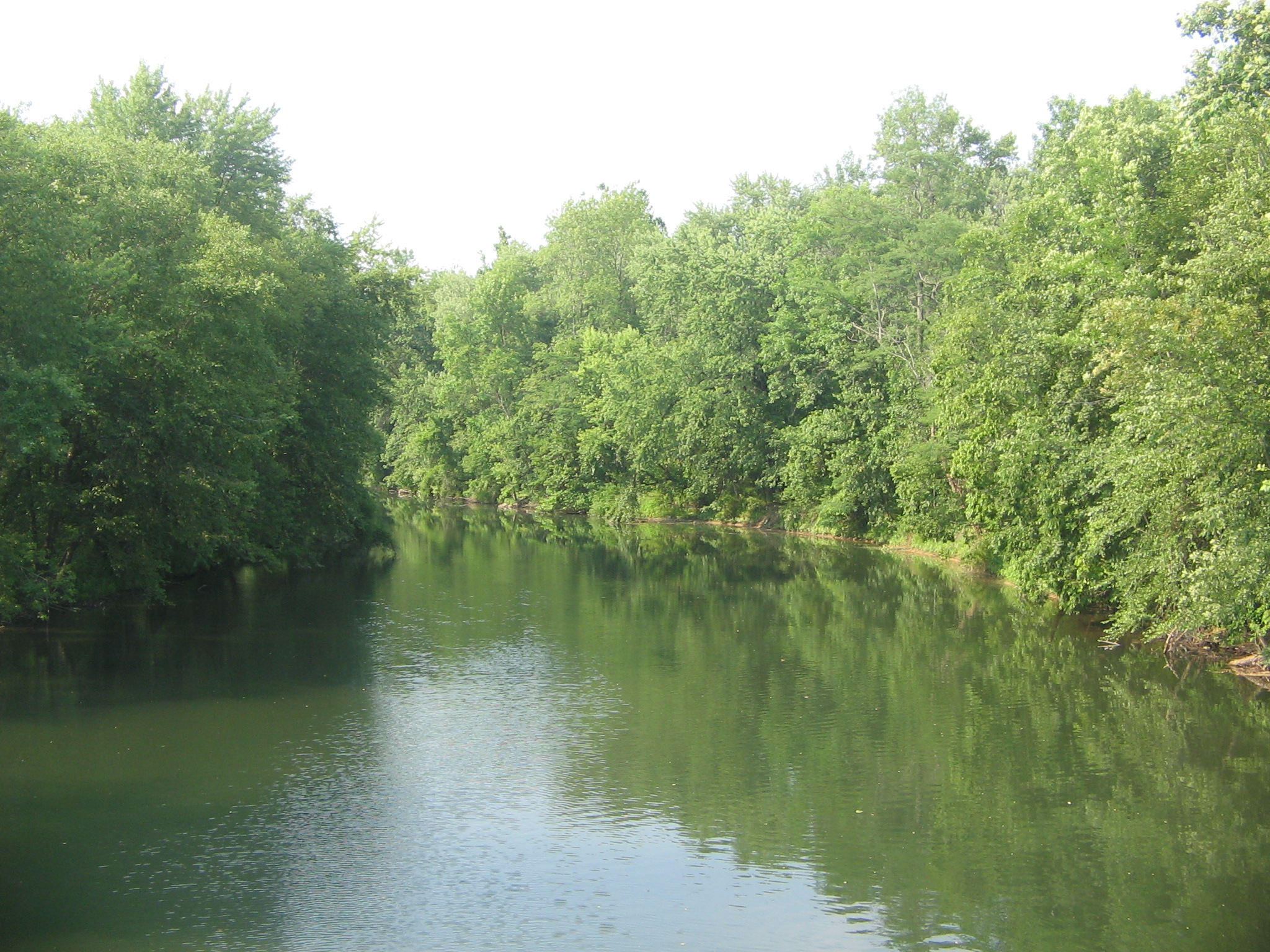
Bald Eagle Creek from Pennsylvania Route 150 near Lock Haven

Bald Eagle Creek is a 55.2-mile-long (88.8 km) tributary of the West Branch Susquehanna River mostly in Centre County, Pennsylvania, in the United States.

Bald Eagle Creek runs through the Bald Eagle Valley at the foot of the Bald Eagle Mountain ridge to Lock Haven.

A shorter Bald Eagle Creek runs south in the valley from the same headlands near the Blair County/Centre County line, terminating in the Little Juniata River in Tyrone.

The main line of the Nittany and Bald Eagle Railroad short line runs along the full length of both Bald Eagle creeks. Interstate 80 crosses the creek between Snow Shoe and Bellefonte, and U.S. Route 322 crosses between Port Matilda and State College. Much of the Nittany Valley drains to the creek through water gaps in the Bald Eagle Mountain ridge.

Located along the creek in Unionville is the Fisher Farm site, a significant archaeological site.

== Principal towns on Bald Eagle Creek ==

From southwest to northeast, downstream along the longer Bald Eagle Creek:

- Port Matilda
- Julian
- Unionville
- Milesburg
- Howard
- Beech Creek
- Mill Hall
- Flemington
- Lock Haven

== See also ==
- List of rivers of Pennsylvania
- Fishing Creek (Bald Eagle Creek)
- Beech Creek (Pennsylvania)
- Spring Creek (Bald Eagle Creek)
- Wallace Run (Bald Eagle Creek)
