= Bald Eagle Township, Pennsylvania =

Township in Pennsylvania, US

Coordinates: 41°07′00″N 77°30′00″W

- Township
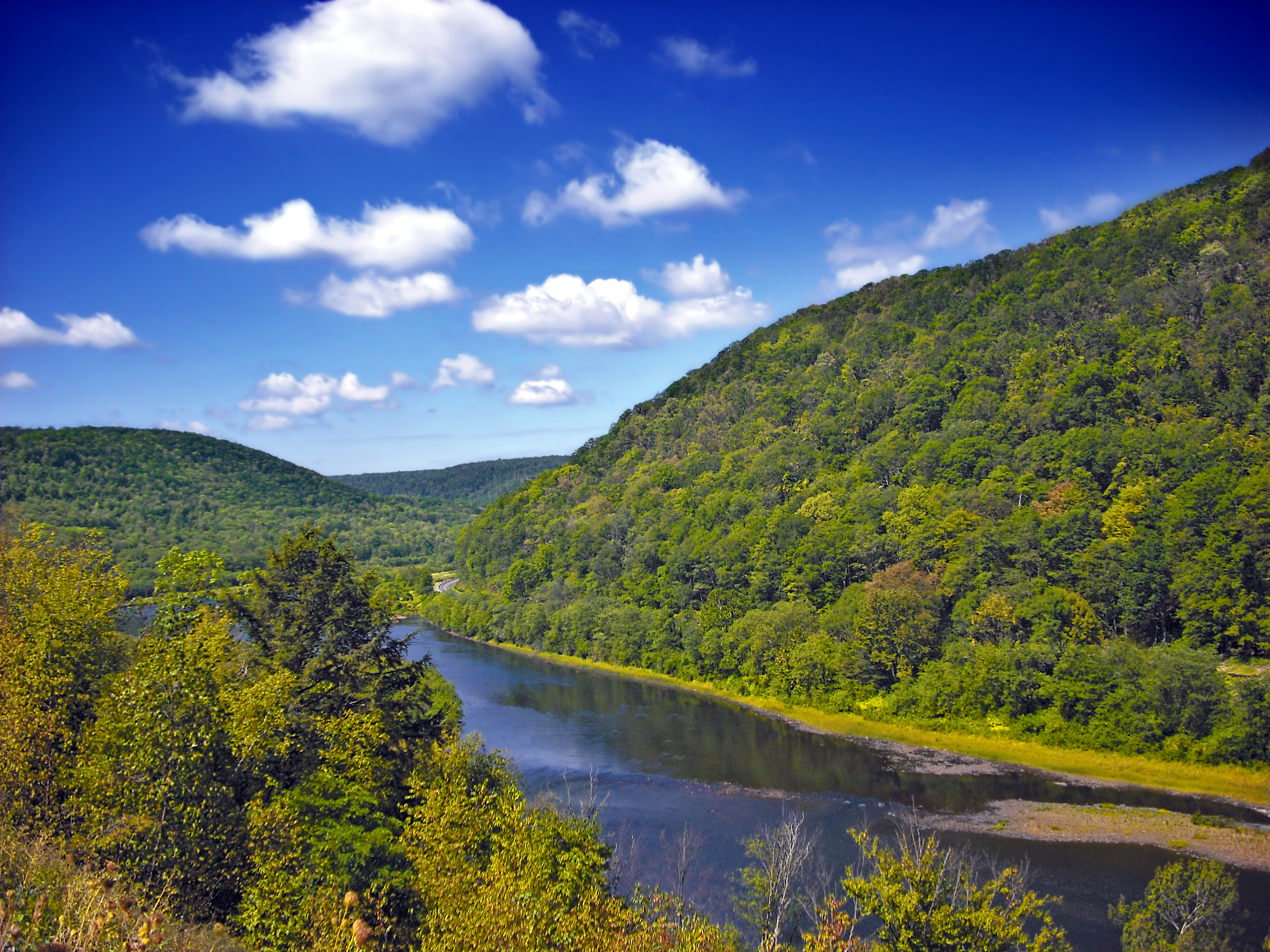
- West Branch Susquehanna River

- Location in Clinton County and the state of Pennsylvania.
- Country: United States
- State: Pennsylvania
- County: Clinton
- Settled: 1769
- Incorporated: Before 1839

Area
  - Total: 42.05 sq mi (108.92 km^{2})
  - Land: 41.63 sq mi (107.83 km^{2})
  - Water: 0.42 sq mi (1.09 km^{2})

Population (2020)
  - Total: 2,039 ▼
  - Estimate (2021): 2,036
  - Density: 50.0/sq mi (19.29/km^{2})
- FIPS code: 42-035-03912
- Website: www.baldeagletownship.com

Bald Eagle Township is a township in Clinton County, Pennsylvania, United States. The population was 2,039 at the 2020 census.

== Geography ==
According to the United States Census Bureau, the township has a total area of 42.0 square miles (108.9 km^{2}), of which 41.6 square miles (107.8 km^{2}) is land and 0.42 square miles (1.1 km^{2}), or 1.00%, is water.

== Demographics ==
Historical population
Census	Pop.	Note	%±
2000	1,898		—
2010	2,065		8.8%
2020	2,039		−1.3%
2021 (est.)	2,036		−0.1%
U.S. Decennial Census

As of the census of 2000, there were 1,898 people, 732 households, and 529 families residing in the township. The population density was 46.1 inhabitants per square mile (17.8/km^{2}). There were 870 housing units at an average density of 21.1/sq mi (8.2/km^{2}). The racial makeup of the township was 98.52% White, 0.42% African American, 0.11% Native American, 0.47% Asian, 0.05% from other races, and 0.42% from two or more races. Hispanic or Latino of any race were 0.16% of the population.

There were 732 households, out of which 32.2% had children under the age of 18 living with them, 58.9% were married couples living together, 10.7% had a female householder with no husband present, and 27.6% were non-families. 21.6% of all households were made up of individuals, and 8.3% had someone living alone who was 65 years of age or older. The average household size was 2.52 and the average family size was 2.91.

In the township the population was spread out, with 24.8% under the age of 18, 8.0% from 18 to 24, 30.6% from 25 to 44, 22.7% from 45 to 64, and 14.0% who were 65 years of age or older. The median age was 38 years. For every 100 females, there were 102.6 males. For every 100 females age 18 and over, there were 99.9 males.

The median income for a household in the township was $31,801, and the median income for a family was $37,625. Males had a median income of $29,286 versus $21,500 for females. The per capita income for the township was $16,616. About 8.5% of families and 12.0% of the population were below the poverty line, including 12.3% of those under age 18 and 7.1% of those age 65 or over.
