= Snow Shoe, Pennsylvania =

- Borough
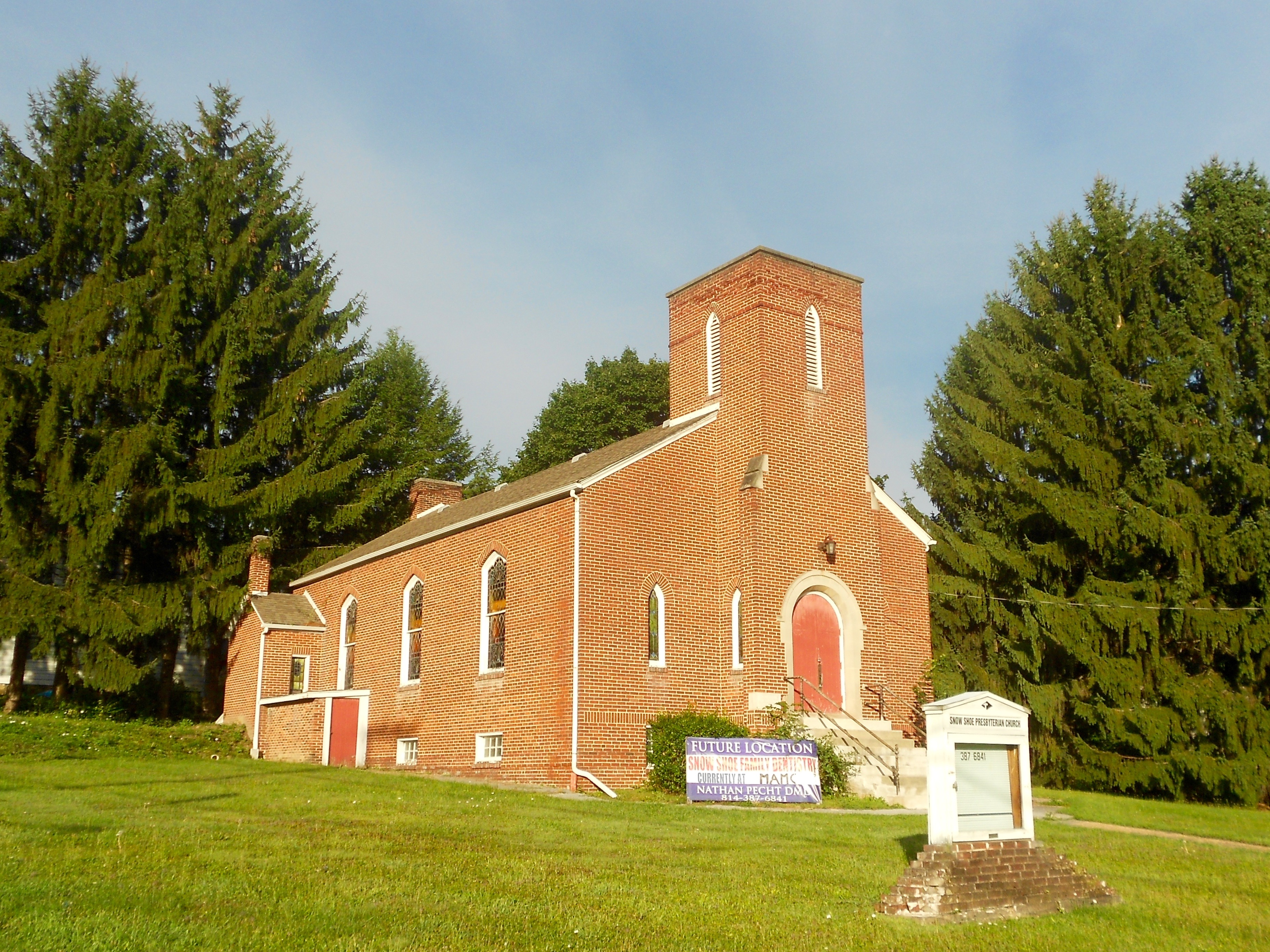
- Former Presbyterian church

- Location of Snow Shoe in Centre County, Pennsylvania.

- Location within Pennsylvania Location within the United States
- Coordinates: 41°01′40″N 77°56′57″W
- Country: United States
- State: Pennsylvania
- County: Centre
- Settled: 1850
- Incorporated (borough): 1907

Area
  - Total: 0.59 sq mi (1.53 km^{2})
  - Land: 0.59 sq mi (1.53 km^{2})
  - Water: 0 sq mi (0.00 km^{2})
- Elevation: 1,601 ft (488 m)

Population (2010)
  - Total: 765
  - Estimate (2019): 765
  - Density: 1,299/sq mi (501.5/km^{2})
- Time zone: Eastern (EST)
  - Summer (DST): EDT
- Zip code: 16874
- Area code: 814
- FIPS code: 42-71600

Snow Shoe is a borough in Centre County, Pennsylvania, United States. It is part of the State College, Pennsylvania Metropolitan Statistical Area. As of the 2020 census, Snow Shoe had a population of 670.

According to tradition, Snow Shoe was so named when a pair of snowshoes were found at an Indian village near the present town site.

== Geography ==
Snow Shoe is located at 41°1′40″N 77°56′57″W (41.027821, -77.949099).

According to the United States Census Bureau, the borough has a total area of 0.6 square miles (1.6 km^{2}), all land.

== Demographics ==
Historical population
Census	Pop.	Note	%±
1880	400		—
1910	643		—
1920	650		1.1%
1930	520		−20.0%
1940	578		11.2%
1950	670		15.9%
1960	714		6.6%
1990	800		—
2000	771		−3.6%
2010	765		−0.8%
2020	670		−12.4%

At the 2010 census there were 765 people, 290 households, and 216 families residing in the borough. The population density was 1,286.9 inhabitants per square mile (496.9/km^{2}). There were 333 housing units at an average density of 560.2 per square mile (216.3/km^{2}). The racial makeup of the borough was 99.6% White, 0.1% Asian, and 0.3% of two or more races. Hispanic or Latino of any race were 0.1%.

There were 290 households, 35.5% had children under the age of 18 living with them, 60.0% were married couples living together, 4.1% had a male householder with no wife present, 10.4% had a female householder with no husband present, and 25.5% were non-families. 22.1% of households were made up of individuals, and 11.8% were one person aged 65 or older. The average household size was 2.64 and the average family size was 3.05.

In the borough the population was spread out, with 24.6% under the age of 18, 8.4% from 18 to 24, 23.9% from 25 to 44, 27.8% from 45 to 64, and 15.3% 65 or older. The median age was 40 years. For every 100 females there were 98.2 males. For every 100 females age 18 and over, there were 101.0 males.

The median household income was $48,789 and the median family income was $52,847. The per capita income for the borough was $21,225. About 2.1% of families and 2.6% of the population were below the poverty line, including 7.0% of those age 65 or over.

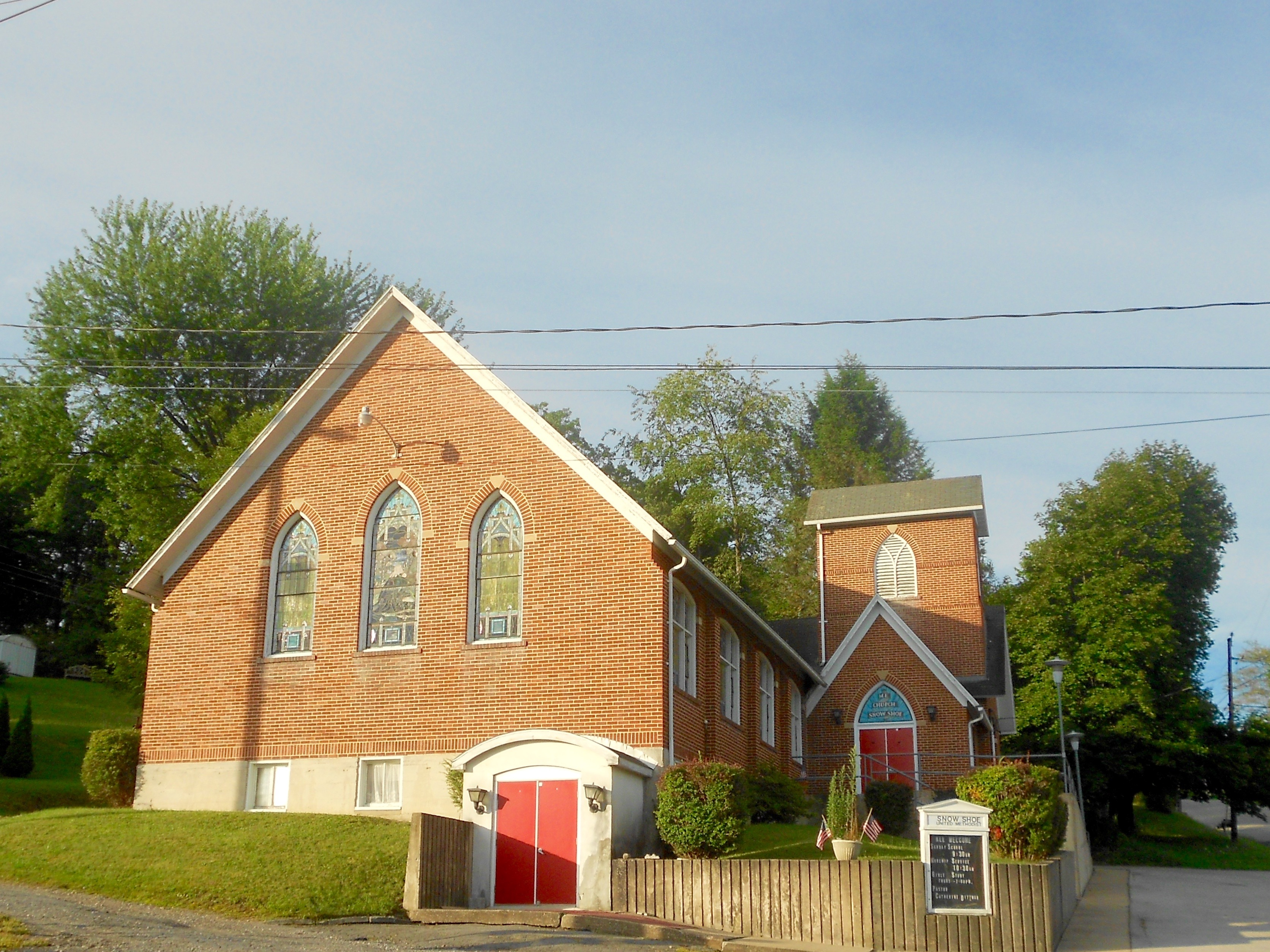
United Methodist Church

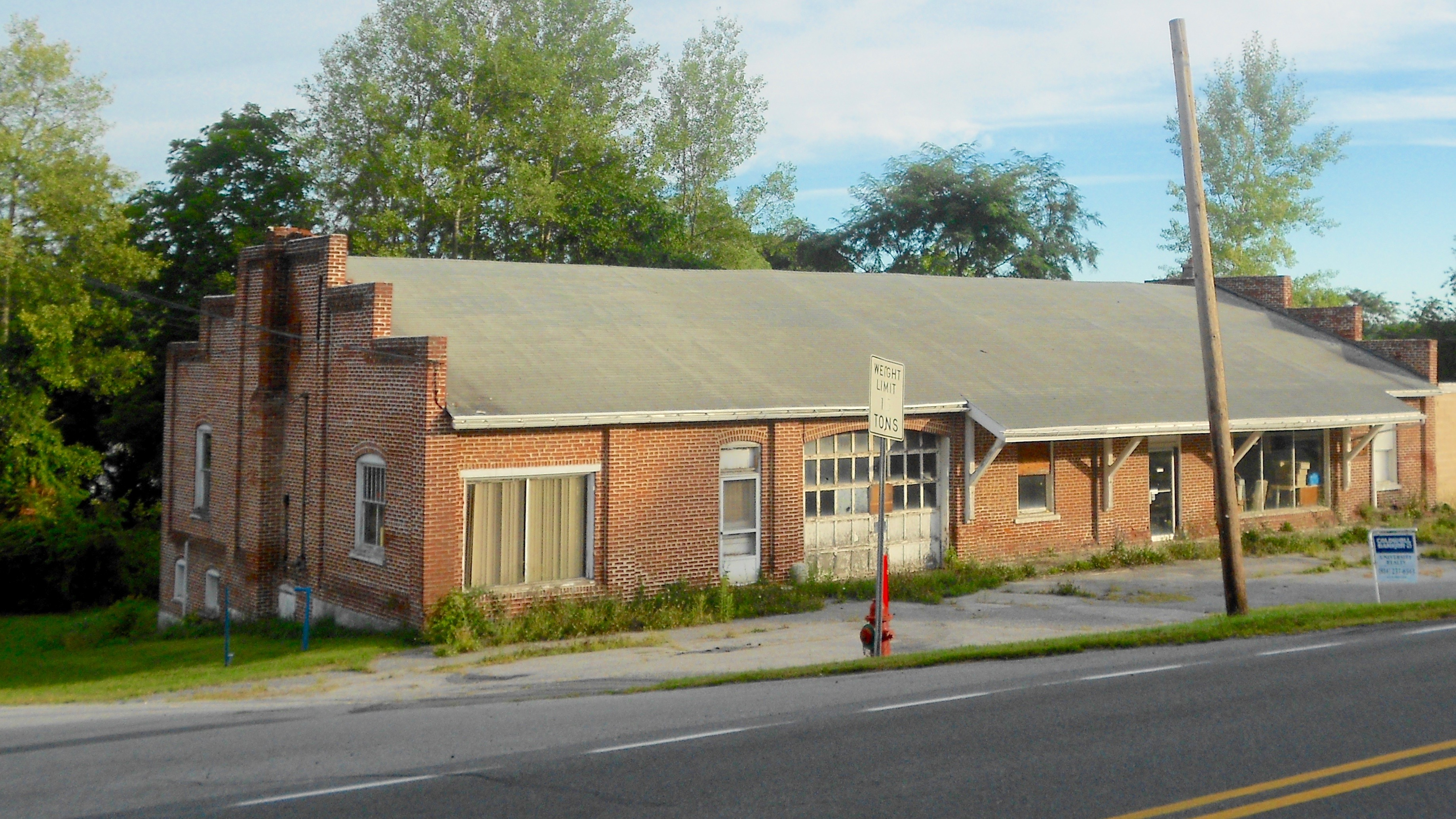
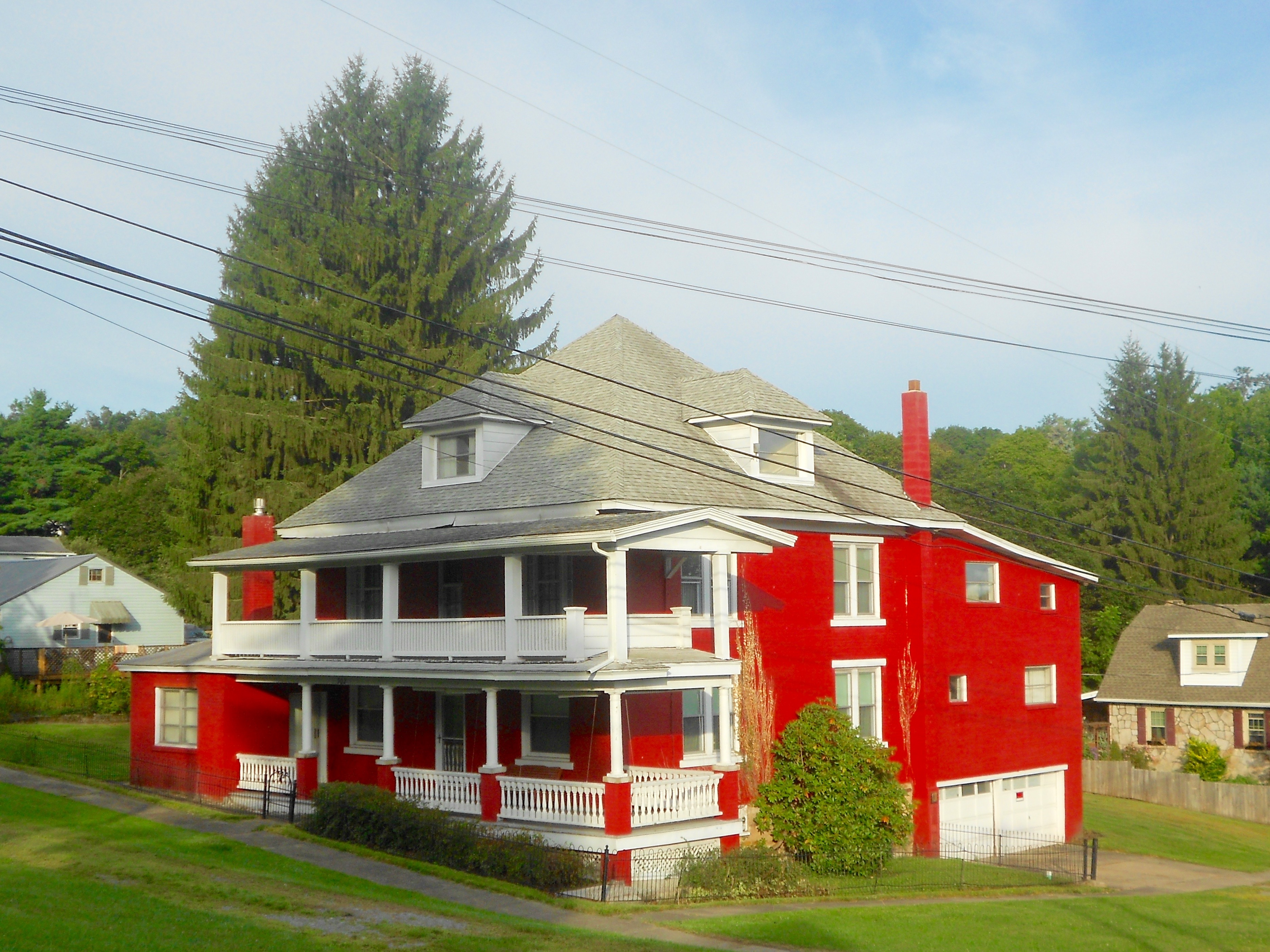

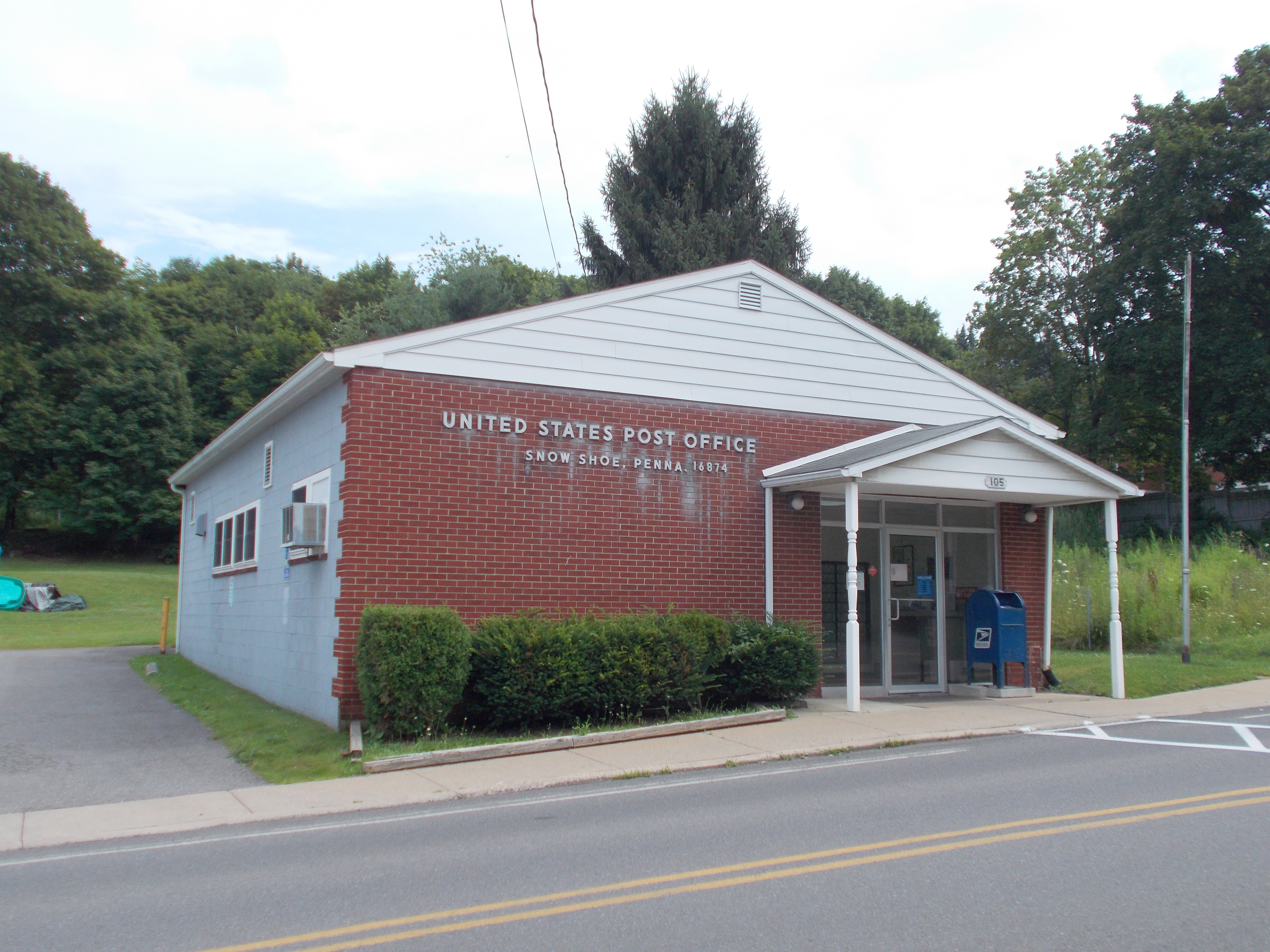
U.S. Post Office, Snow Shoe, Pennsylvania, July 2017
