= Holters Crossing, Pennsylvania =

Unincorporated community in Pennsylvania, US

- Census-designated place
- Location within Pennsylvania Location within the United States
- Coordinates: 40°58′20″N 77°43′24″W
- Country: United States
- State: Pennsylvania
- County: Centre
- Townships: Boggs; Howard

Area
  - Total: 0.093 sq mi (0.24 km^{2})
  - Land: 0.093 sq mi (0.24 km^{2})
  - Water: 0 sq mi (0.00 km^{2})
- Elevation: 678 ft (207 m)

Population (2020)
  - Total: 111
  - Density: 1,183.0/sq mi (456.77/km^{2})
- Time zone: UTC-5 (Eastern (EST))
  - Summer (DST): UTC-4 (EDT)
- ZIP Code: 16841 (Howard)
- Area codes: 814/582
- FIPS code: 42-35336
- GNIS feature ID: 2805511

Holters Crossing is an unincorporated community and census-designated place (CDP) in Centre County, Pennsylvania, United States. It was first listed as a CDP prior to the 2020 census.

The CDP is in northern Centre County, mostly in the southeastern part of Boggs Township and partly in the southwestern corner of Howard Township. It sits in the Bald Eagle Valley, on the south side of Bald Eagle Creek. County Route 1006 (old U.S. Route 220) is the main road through the community; it leads southwest 4 miles (6 km) to Milesburg and northeast 1.5 miles (2.4 km) to a dead end at Mount Eagle, at the head of Foster Joseph Sayers Reservoir, an impoundment on Bald Eagle Creek.

Bald Eagle Mountain rises to the southeast above Holters Crossing to a ridgecrest elevation of 1,560 feet (480 m).

== Demographics ==
Historical population
Census	Pop.	Note	%±
2020	111		—
U.S. Decennial Census
