= Bald Eagle State Park =

State park in Pennsylvania, United States

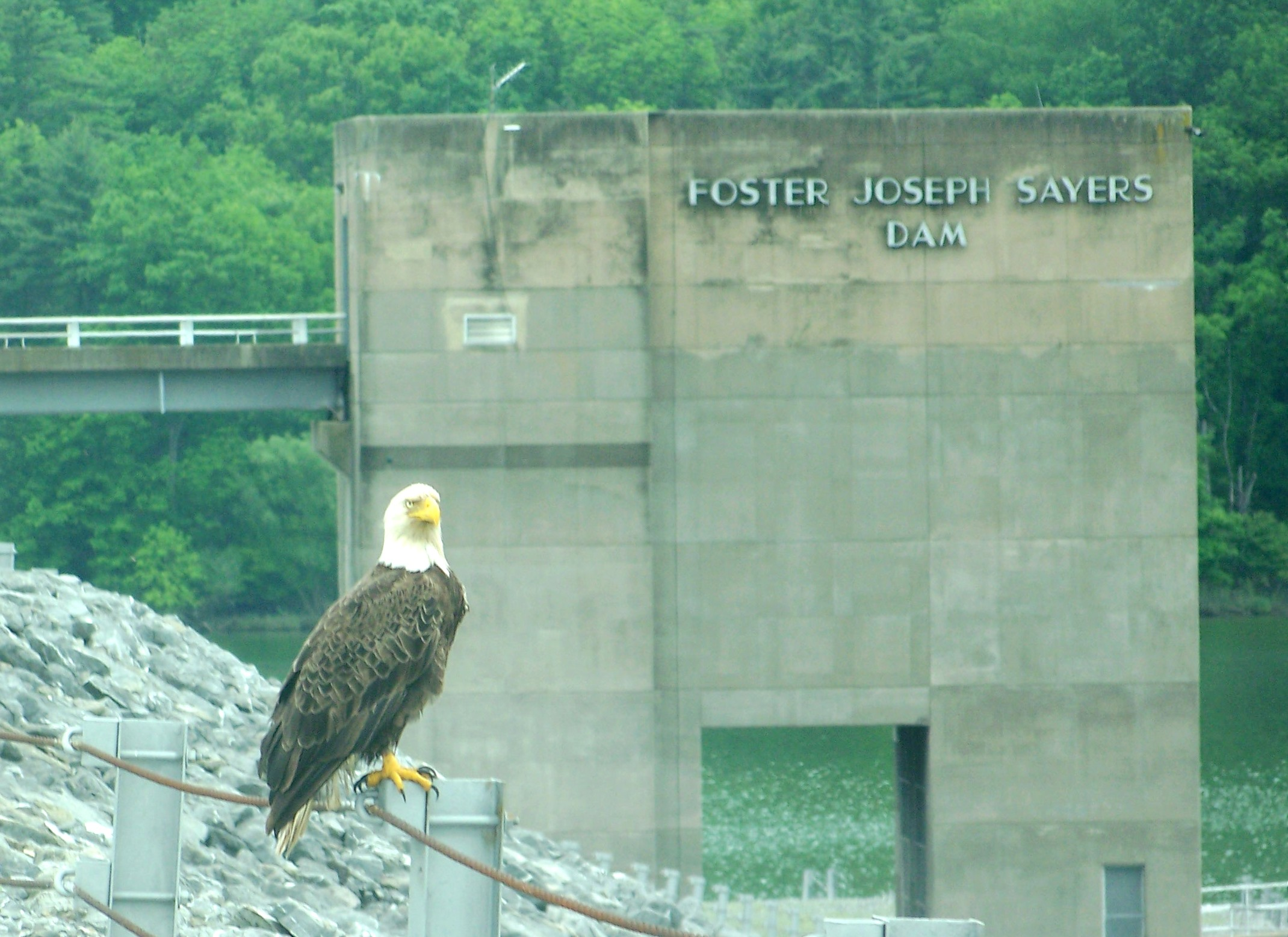
- Eagle nesting near Foster Joseph Sayers Dam

- Location within Pennsylvania Location within the United States
- Interactive map of Bald Eagle State Park
- Location: Centre County, Pennsylvania, United States
- Coordinates: 41°02′05″N 77°39′04″W
- Area: 5,900 acres (2,400 ha)
- Elevation: 958 ft (292 m)
- Established: 1971
- Administrator: Pennsylvania Department of Conservation and Natural Resources
- Named for: Bald Eagle Creek
- Website: Official website
- Pennsylvania State Parks

Bald Eagle State Park is a 5,900-acre (2,388 ha) Pennsylvania state park in Howard, Liberty, and Marion townships in Centre County, Pennsylvania in the United States. The park includes the Foster Joseph Sayers Reservoir, formed by damming Bald Eagle Creek and other smaller streams and covering 1,730 acres (700 ha). Bald Eagle State Park is at the meeting point of two distinct geologic features. The Allegheny Plateau is to the north and the Ridge and Valley area of Pennsylvania is to the south. The park is in the Bald Eagle Valley off Pennsylvania Route 150 in Howard, between Milesburg and Lock Haven.

== History ==
=== Lenape ===
The park is named for the Lenape chief, Woapalanne, meaning bald eagle. Chief Woapalanne lived in the area for a brief period of time during the mid-18th century in a village that was on Bald Eagle Creek Path, part of the much more extensive Great Indian Warpath that stretched from New York into the Carolinas. This path was used by the Iroquois to conduct raids on the Cherokee in North Carolina, South Carolina, Tennessee, and Georgia. Pennsylvania Route 150 follows this path in some areas near Bald Eagle State Park.

=== Iron and lumber ===
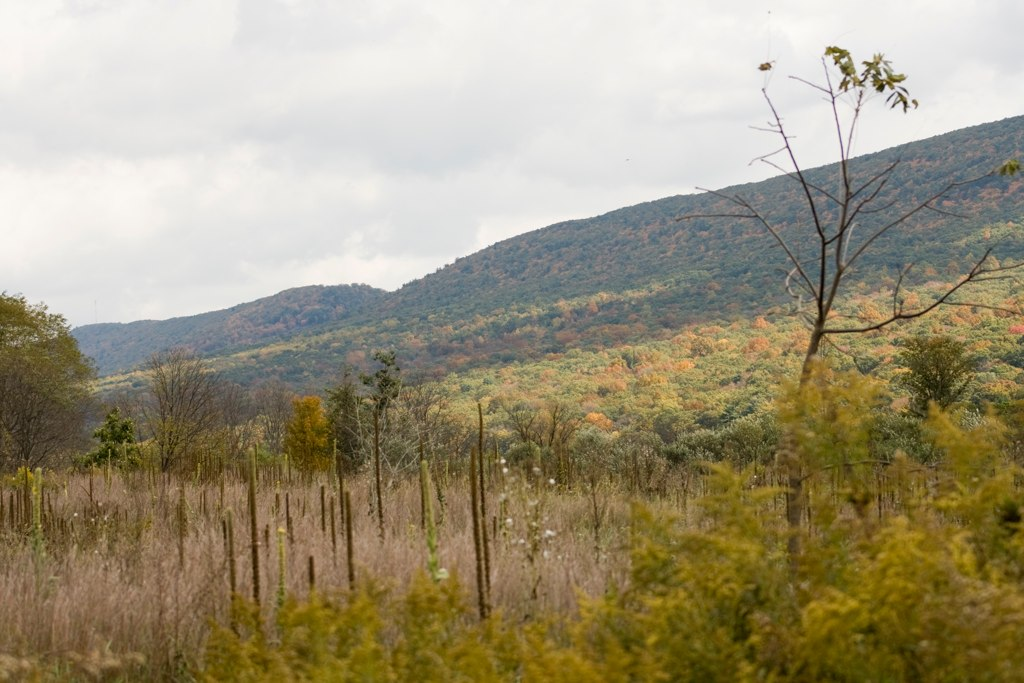
Bald Eagle Mountain, which was stripped of old growth timber during the lumber era and is now covered with a second growth forest

Bald Eagle Creek is one of the few navigable tributaries of the West Branch Susquehanna River in Centre County. This made it a vital part of the transportation network in Centre County's early days. The Bald Eagle and Spring Creek Navigation canal was built from the Pennsylvania Canal at Lock Haven up Bald Eagle Creek and Spring Creek into Bellefonte in 1848. This canal was damaged by flooding in 1867 and went out of service. It was replaced by the Bald Eagle Valley Railroad, which completed its line along the valley in 1865.

The availability of transportation and vast natural resources drew the iron industry and later the lumber industry to Bald Eagle Valley. The Eagle Ironworks was built in 1810 by Roland Curtin, an immigrant from Ireland. The ironworks produced iron along Bald Eagle Creek until it was closed in 1922. At first charcoal was used to fire the furnaces. This charcoal was produced locally by colliers who harvested timber from the mountainsides and slowly burned the logs to produce charcoal. Later the furnaces were adapted to use coal, another of Pennsylvania's plentiful natural resources.

The demand for lumber products reached the Bald Eagle area in the mid-to-late 19th century. Vast stands of old-growth forest were harvested and sent down the West Branch Susquehanna River to the sawmills at Williamsport. The once abundant stands of pine, oak, hickory, chestnut and hemlock were stripped from the hills and valleys. The land in the valley was converted to farmland and is still farmed today. The forests on Bald Eagle Mountain have since regrown forming an extensive second growth forest.

== Foster Joseph Sayers Reservoir ==
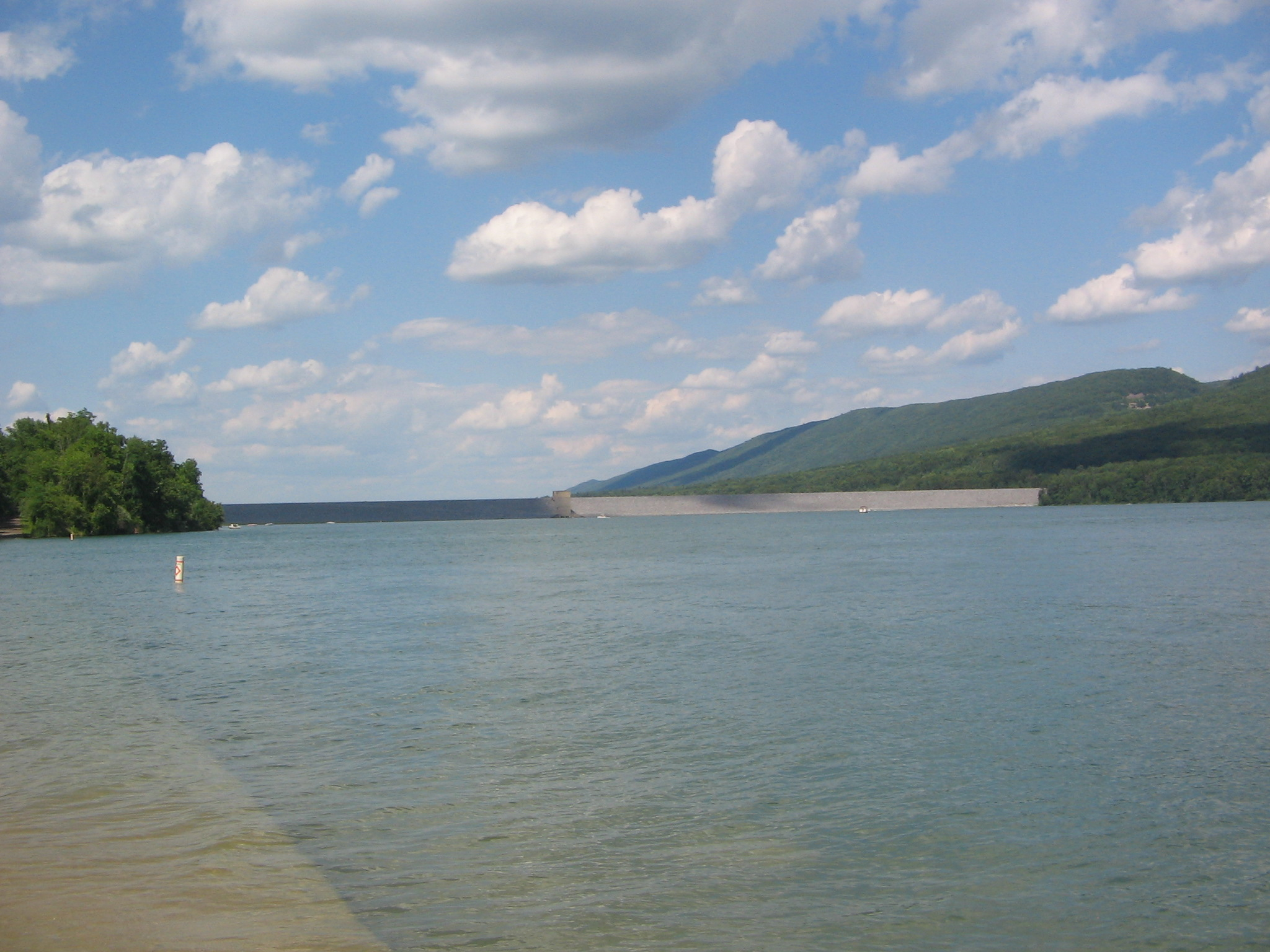
Foster Joseph Sayers dam and reservoir

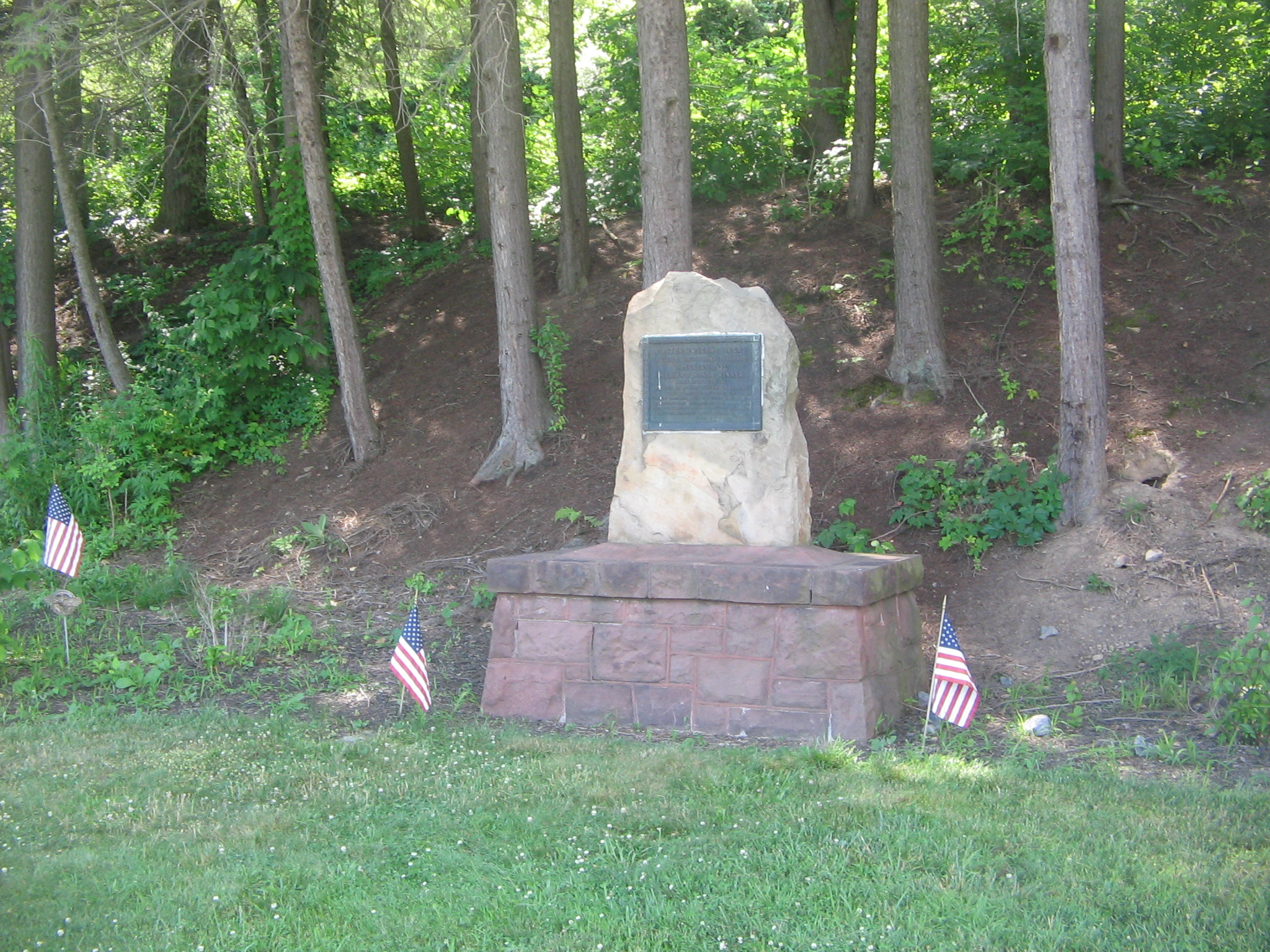
Memorial to Foster Joseph Sayers in the park

Foster Joseph Sayers Reservoir is a 1,730-acre (700 ha) reservoir that was built in 1969 by the U.S. Army Corps of Engineers as part of a flood control project on the Susquehanna River basin. The lake was created by damming Bald Eagle Creek. It stretches upstream for 8 miles (12.87 km) and has 23 miles (37.01 km) of shoreline. The lake is named for Foster Joseph Sayers a World War II hero.

=== Boating ===
Unlimited horsepower motorboats are permitted on Foster Joseph Sayers Reservoir. Boats equipped with inboard engines with over the transom or straight-stack type exhausts are not permitted. All boats must have current registration with any state. Boaters must adhere to the speed-limit of 45 mph (72 km/h) and follow the counterclockwise pattern when navigating the lake. The marina has 369 docking slips that are available to rent seasonally or daily. Inland Marine and Power Sports operates the marina and provides various services to the public.

- a limited grocery store
- towing service
- mechanic service for boats, motors and trailers
- boat and water ski rental
- gas sales, boat sales, and sales of boating equipment and accessories

There are six boat launches at Bald Eagle State Park. All are open 24 hours with parking and restroom facilities.

=== Fishing ===
Foster Joseph Sayers Reservoir is a warm water fishery. Fishing is permitted from the shore, on boats and from an ADA accessible pier located at the main boat launch in the central park area. The common game fish are largemouth and smallmouth bass, crappie, yellow perch, and channel catfish. Tiger muskellunge have not been stocked in this lake for at least 10 years. They were briefly introduced to take care of a non-native species, which are no longer a threat.

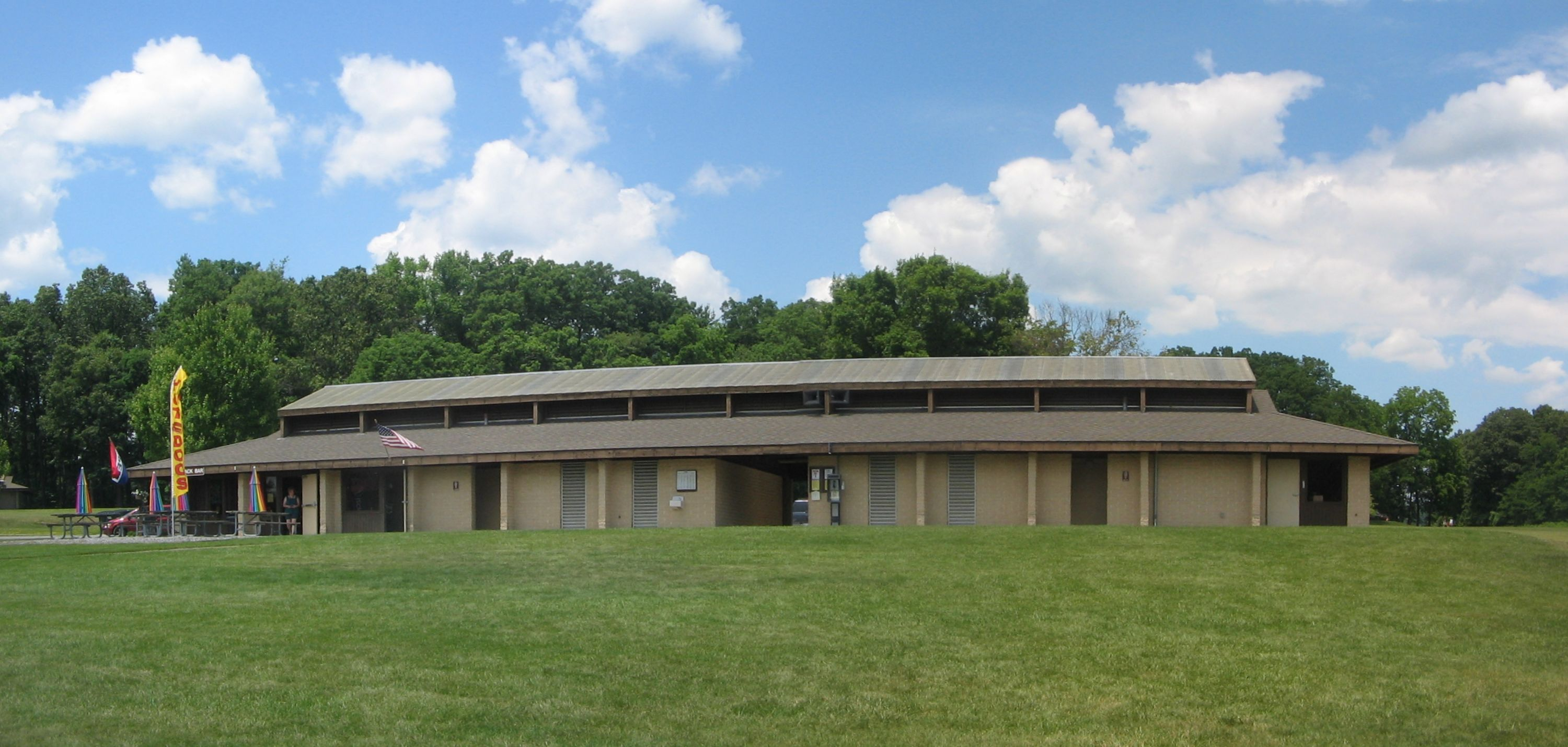
The beachhouse

=== Swimming ===
Swimming is permitted on a beach stretching 1,200 feet (366 m) along the lake. The beach is open Memorial Day weekend until Labor Day weekend. The beach area includes a playground, snack bar, baby changing rooms, restrooms, and parking.

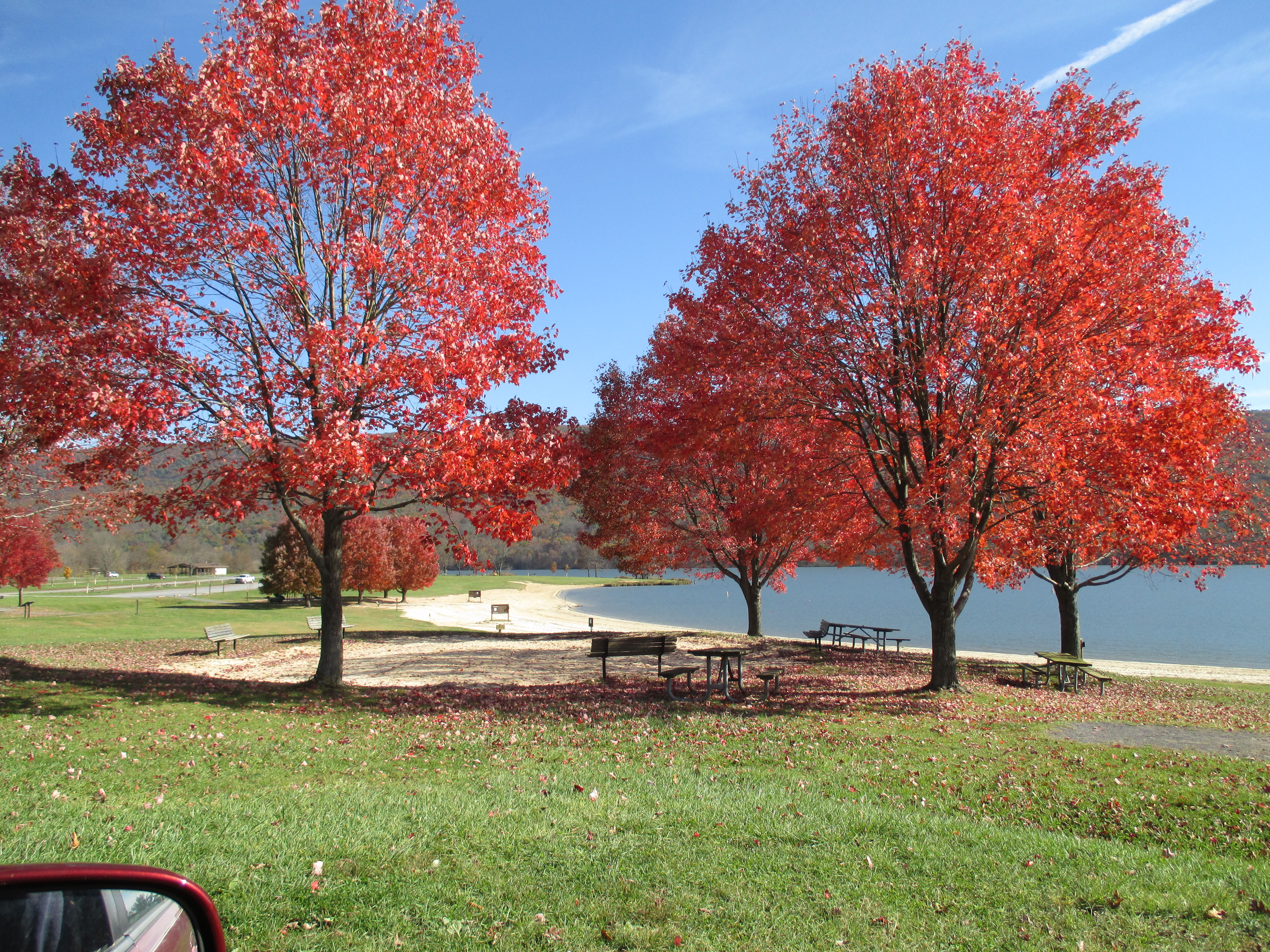
trees near the beach in the fall

== Other recreation ==
=== Picnics ===
There are four picnic area at Bald Eagle State Park.

- Schencks Grove Picnic Area is on a point near the beach and marina. It has two pavilions with tables and several other picnic tables. This area also features two restrooms, two play fields, four horseshoe pits and four outdoor volleyball courts.
- Beach Picnic Area is near the beach. It has four pavilions, two volleyball courts and some horseshoe pits.
- Skyline Picnic Area is northeast of Schencks Picnic Area. It has a pavilion and shaded picnic tables, four restrooms, a volleyball court and horseshoe pit.
- Summer/Winter Launch Picnic Area has a pavilion, a fishing pier, restroom, volleyball court and horseshoe pit.

=== Hunting ===
Hunting is permitted on about 4,910 acres (1,990 ha) of Bald Eagle State Park. The most common game species are squirrels, turkey, rabbits, pheasant and white-tailed deer. The hunting of groundhogs is prohibited. Hunters are expected to follow the rules and regulations of the Pennsylvania Game Commission.

=== Trails ===
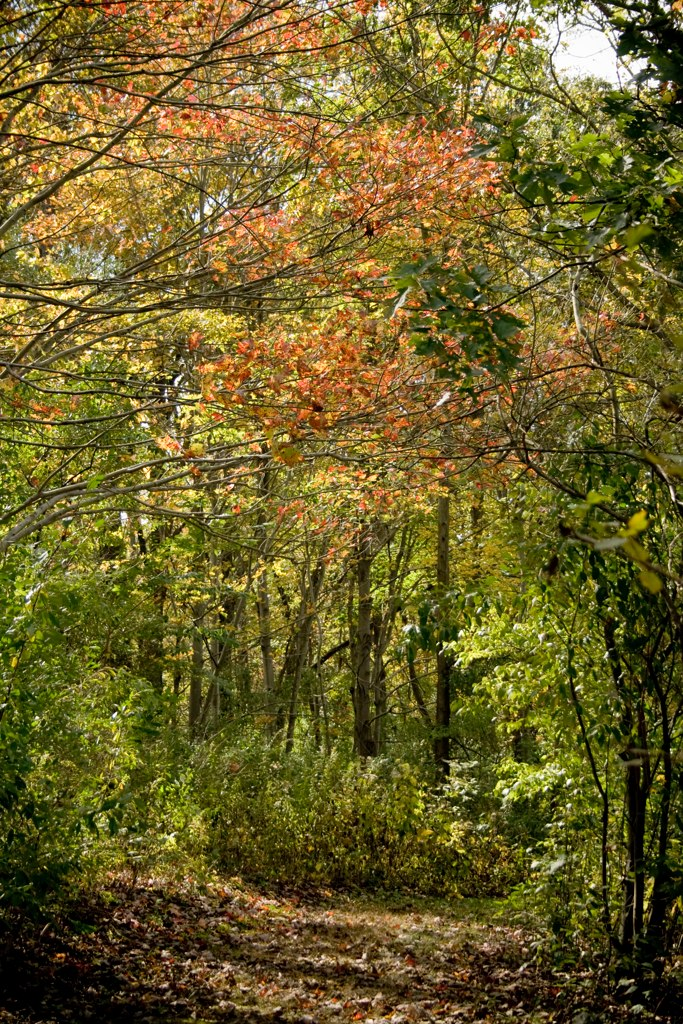
Skyline Drive Trail in autumn

Bald Eagle State Park has 11 miles (18 km) of trails that are open for hiking and cross-country skiing. Some of the trails pass through areas that are open to hunting—hikers and skiers are asked to wear blaze orange when using the trails during the hunting seasons. All trails are open year-round at 8:00 a.m. and are closed at sunset.

- Butterfly Trail - (1.5 miles (2.4 km)) is an easy loop trail marked with red blazes. It is a mowed grass trail and was created for the conservation of butterflies. The trail begins and ends near the beach. It loops around a pond and passes through a mix of grasses, shrubs, wildflowers, and young trees. This mixture of plant life creates a habitat for butterflies.
- Hunter Run West Trail - (2 miles (3.2 km)) is a moderate trail marked with orange blazes. It begins near the campground at the Route 150 underpass. It is a mowed path that passes through a mix of forest and field habitats. Old stone fencerows can be seen near the trail. These fencerows are remnants of the farms that were once on the lands of Bald Eagle State Park.
- Hunter Run East Trail - (2 miles (3.2 km)) also begins near the campground and is a moderate trail marked with yellow blazes. The trail is on the northwest border of the park. It passes through a mix of forest and shrub areas. The shrubs are habitats for chickadees, gray catbirds and towhees.
- Lakeside Trail - (5.4 miles (8.7 km)) is a moderate hiking trail marked with blue blazes. The trail is very rocky and runs along the base of Bald Eagle Mountain. It passes by the lake amongst a mature hardwood forest of oak, maple and hickory trees. The trail also passes by signs of the charcoal industry that once thrived in the area to supply charcoal for the iron furnaces owned by Roland Curtin.
- Skyline Drive Trail - (2 miles (3.2 km)) is an easy trail marked with white blazes. It connects with Butterfly Trail and passes through fields that are in various stages of ecological succession, gradually changing from the fields cleared by farmers back into forest.

=== Camping ===
Russel P. Letterman campground is a modern campground with 97 campsites, three cottages, two yurts, hot showers, an amphitheater, a sanitary dump station and two volleyball courts. There is a paved parking area at each campsite as well as a picnic table and fire ring. All campsites have an electrical hook-up. The primitive camping area 3 has 5 walk-in sites and 35 sites for small campers. Outhouses are available, as well as sinks with running water.

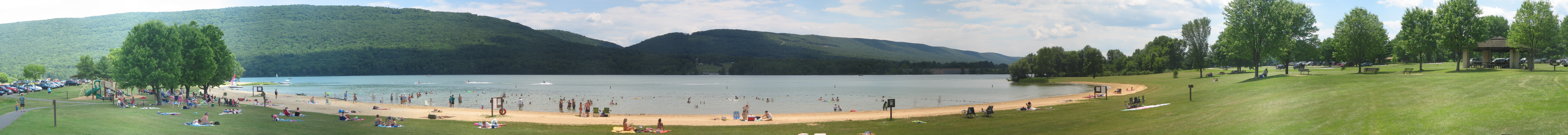
Panoramic view of the beach at Bald Eagle State Park, with Foster Joseph Sayers Reservoir and Bald Eagle Mountain
