= Mount Eagle, Pennsylvania =

Unincorporated community in Pennsylvania, US

- Census designated place
- Map showing Centre County in Pennsylvania

- Location in Pennsylvania Mount Eagle (the United States)
- Coordinates: 40°58′49″N 77°42′29″W
- Country: United States
- State: Pennsylvania
- County: Centre
- Township: Howard

Area
  - Total: 0.26 sq mi (0.67 km^{2})
  - Land: 0.26 sq mi (0.67 km^{2})
  - Water: 0 sq mi (0.00 km^{2})
- Elevation: 690 ft (210 m)

Population (2020)
  - Total: 89
  - Density: 342.1/sq mi (132.08/km^{2})
- Time zone: UTC-5 (Eastern (EST))
  - Summer (DST): UTC-4 (EDT)
- FIPS code: 42-51552
- GNIS feature ID: 1181684

Mount Eagle is an unincorporated community and census-designated place in Howard Township, Centre County, Pennsylvania, United States. As of the 2010 census, the population was 103.

It is located near the southern corner of Howard Township along Old Route 220, to the southeast of Bald Eagle Creek where it flows into Foster J. Sayers Lake. The long ridge of Bald Eagle Mountain is to the southeast of the town. Old Route 220 dead-ends a short distance to the northeast, where its former route is now inundated by the lake, so the only road access is to the southwest through Boggs Township. The borough of Howard is 4 miles (6 km) to the northeast but 9 miles (14 km) by road.

== Demographics ==
Historical population
Census	Pop.	Note	%±
2020	89		—
U.S. Decennial Census
