= Howard Township, Pennsylvania =

Township in Pennsylvania, US

Coordinates: 41°01′00″N 77°39′59″W

- Township
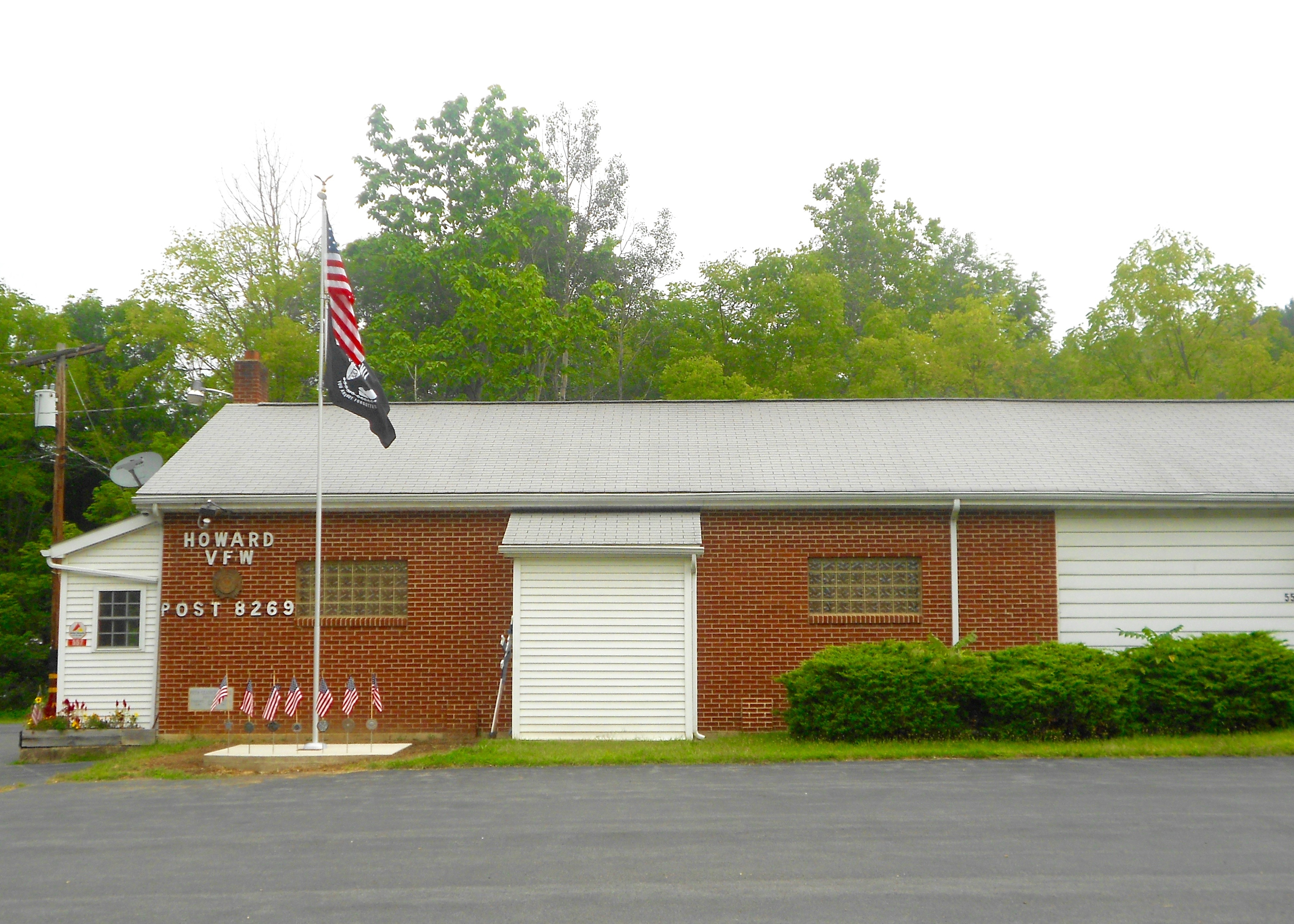
- Howard VFW

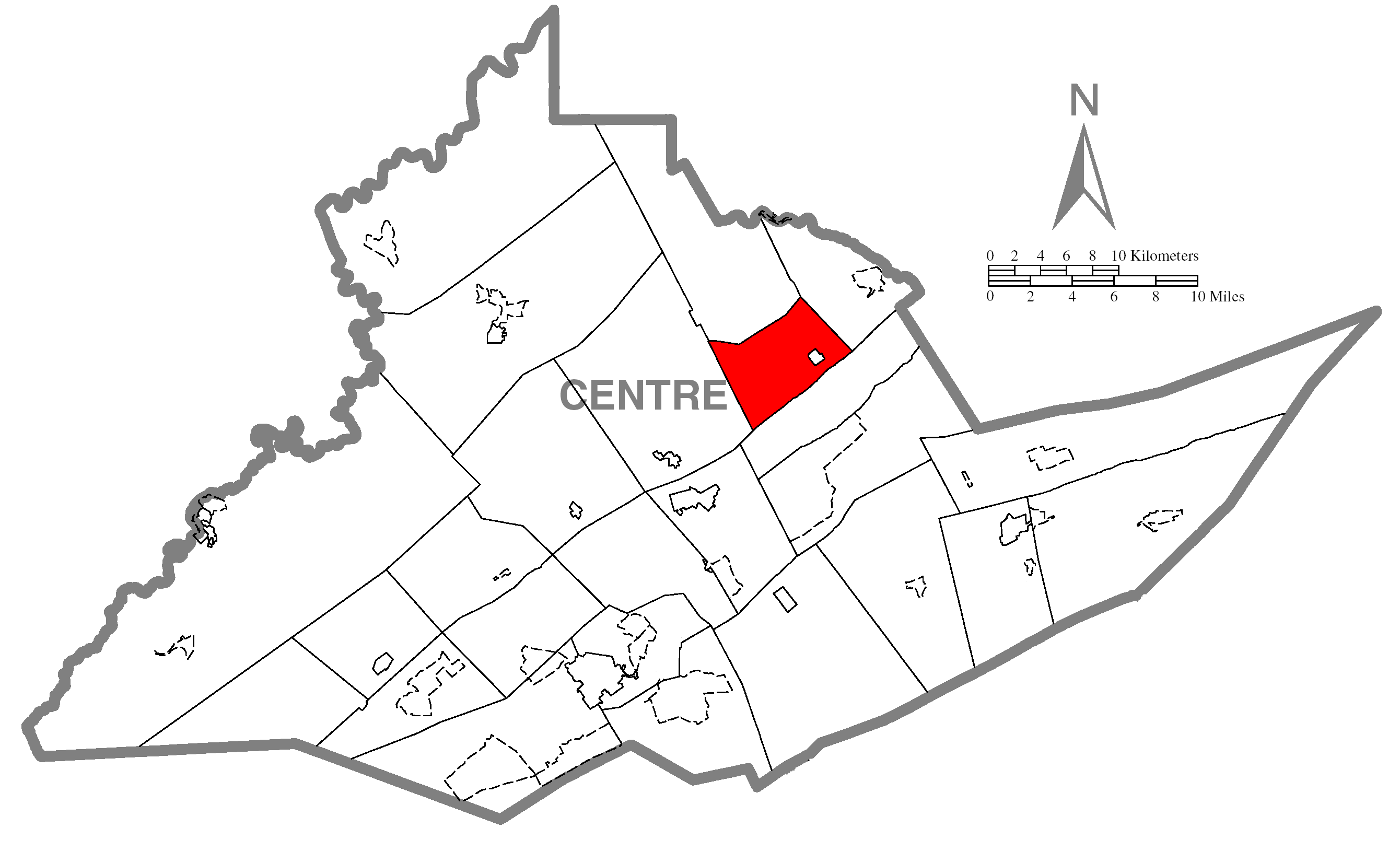
- Map of Centre County, Pennsylvania highlighting Howard Township

- Map of Centre County, Pennsylvania
- Country: United States
- State: Pennsylvania
- County: Centre
- Settled: 1778
- Incorporated: 1810

Area
  - Total: 18.92 sq mi (49.00 km^{2})
  - Land: 18.00 sq mi (46.63 km^{2})
  - Water: 0.92 sq mi (2.38 km^{2})

Population (2020)
  - Total: 878 ▼
  - Estimate (2021): 875
  - Density: 53.2/sq mi (20.55/km^{2})
- FIPS code: 42-027-35968

Historical population
Census	Pop.	Note	%±
2000	924		—
2010	964		4.3%
2020	878		−8.9%
2021 (est.)	875		−0.3%
U.S. Decennial Census

Howard Township is a township in Centre County, Pennsylvania, United States. It is part of the State College, Pennsylvania Metropolitan Statistical Area. The population was 878 at the 2020 census. Part of Bald Eagle State Park is in Howard Township.

== Geography ==
According to the United States Census Bureau, the township has a total area of 18.9 square miles (49.0 km^{2}), of which 18.0 square miles (46.6 km^{2}) is land and 0.93 square miles (2.4 km^{2}), or 4.85%, is water.

Howard Township is bordered by Curtin Township to the northwest, Liberty Township to the northeast, Marion Township to the southeast and Boggs Township to the southwest and it surrounds the borough of Howard. The township includes the census-designated place of Mount Eagle and part of Holters Crossing.

== Demographics ==
As of the census of 2000, there were 924 people, 344 households, and 275 families residing in the township. The population density was 50.3 people per square mile (19.4 people/km^{2}). There were 375 housing units at an average density of 20.4 per square mile (7.9/km^{2}). The racial makeup of the township was 99.03% White, 0.54% African American, 0.22% Native American, 0.22% from other races. Hispanic or Latino of any race were 0.65% of the population.

There were 344 households, out of which 32.3% had children under the age of 18 living with them, 68.3% were married couples living together, 6.7% had a female householder with no husband present, and 19.8% were non-families. 15.7% of all households were made up of individuals, and 7.0% had someone living alone who was 65 years of age or older. The average household size was 2.69 and the average family size was 3.01.

In the township the population was spread out, with 23.4% under the age of 18, 7.5% from 18 to 24, 31.6% from 25 to 44, 27.2% from 45 to 64, and 10.4% who were 65 years of age or older. The median age was 38 years. For every 100 females, there were 104.4 males. For every 100 females age 18 and over, there were 103.4 males.

The median income for a household in the township was $39,375, and the median income for a family was $43,068. Males had a median income of $31,522 versus $21,316 for females. The per capita income for the township was $16,175. About 3.8% of families and 5.5% of the population were below the poverty line, including 9.8% of those under age 18 and 4.6% of those age 65 or over.

== Notable people ==
- William Fisher Packer - 14th Governor of Pennsylvania from 1858 to 1861
- Frances Tipton Hunter - Cover illustrator of The Saturday Evening Post
