= Foster Joseph Sayers Reservoir =

Reservoir in Pennsylvania

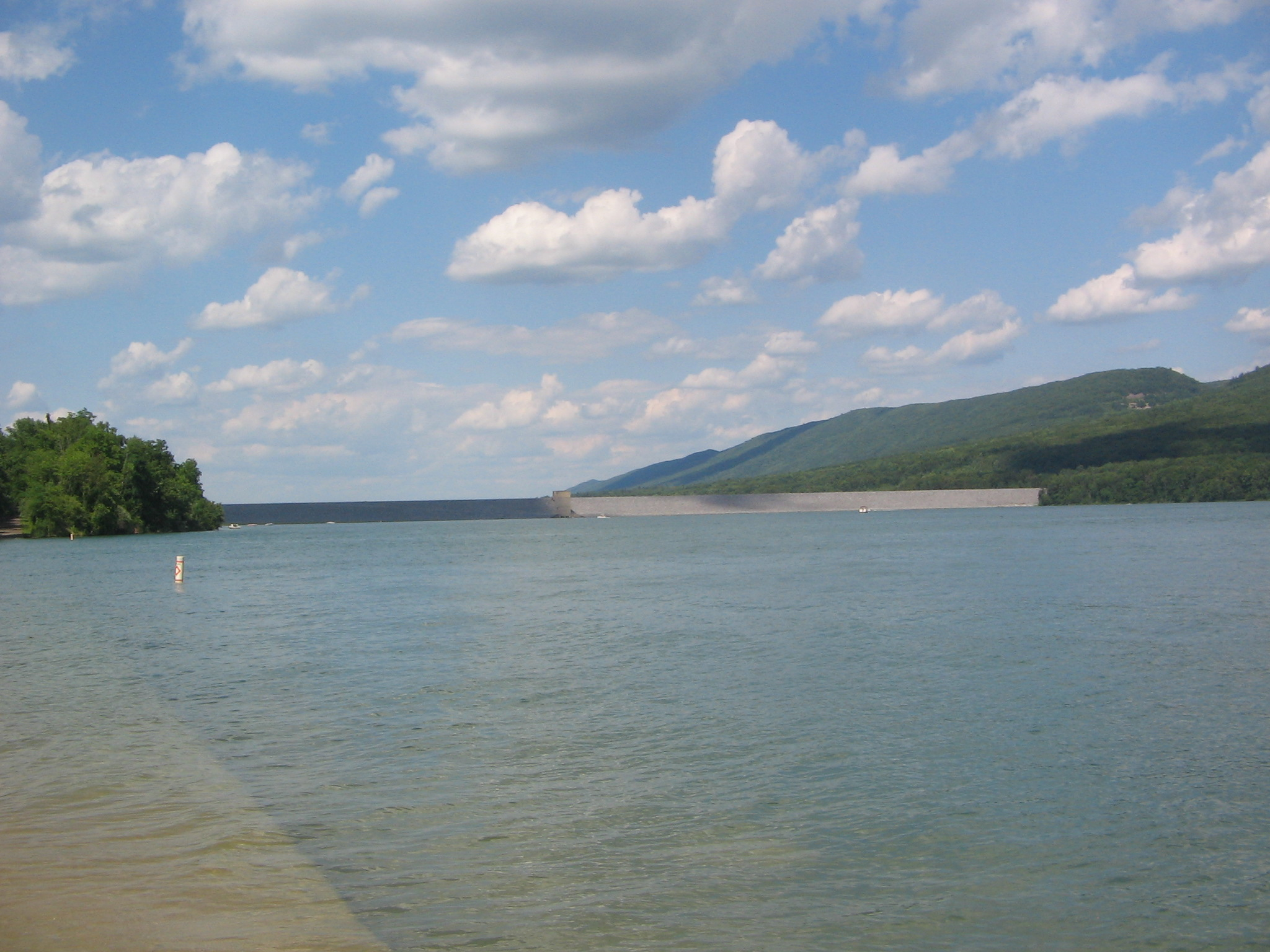

- Location within Pennsylvania Location within the United States
- Location: Centre County, Pennsylvania, United States, near Howard
- Coordinates: 41°01′21″N 77°38′59″W
- Type: reservoir
- Basin countries: United States
- Max. length: 6 miles (9.7 km) (approx.)
- Max. width: less than 1 mile (1.6 km)
- Surface area: 1,730 acres (700 ha)
- Shore length^{1}: 23 miles (37 km)
- Surface elevation: 958 ft (292 m)
- ^{1} Shore length is not a well-defined measure.

Foster Joseph Sayers Reservoir is a reservoir located near the borough of Howard, Pennsylvania. The lake is formed due to the damming of Bald Eagle Creek, a tributary of the West Branch Susquehanna River, as well as other smaller creeks. The dam was created in 1969 by the United States Army Corps of Engineers to prevent flooding and continue water quality down stream.

The lake is named in honor of Foster Joseph Sayers, a World War II hero from the nearby town of Howard. He was awarded the Medal of Honor for his acts of bravery at the battle near Thionville, France, in 1944.

In 1971, the formation of Bald Eagle State Park occurred with the formation of the new lake, bringing boating, fishing and swimming to the area. Common fish species in the lake are Sunfish, Catfish, Largemouth and Smallmouth Bass, Yellow Perch, Crappie and Tiger Muskellunge.
