= Moose Run, Pennsylvania =

Unincorporated community in Pennsylvania, US

- Census-designated place
- Location within Pennsylvania Location within the United States
- Coordinates: 40°57′4″N 77°47′59″W
- Country: United States
- State: Pennsylvania
- County: Centre
- Township: Boggs

Area
  - Total: 0.36 sq mi (0.92 km^{2})
  - Land: 0.36 sq mi (0.92 km^{2})
  - Water: 0 sq mi (0.00 km^{2})
- Elevation: 750 ft (230 m)

Population (2020)
  - Total: 171
  - Density: 482.9/sq mi (186.45/km^{2})
- Time zone: UTC-5 (Eastern (EST))
  - Summer (DST): UTC-4 (EDT)
- ZIP Code: 16823 (Bellefonte)
- Area codes: 814/582
- FIPS code: 42-50879
- GNIS feature ID: 2805529

Moose Run is a census-designated place (CDP) in Centre County, Pennsylvania, United States. It was first listed as a CDP prior to the 2020 census.

The CDP is in north-central Centre County, in the south part of Boggs Township. It sits in the valley of Moose Run, a south-flowing tributary of Bald Eagle Creek, part of the watershed of the West Branch Susquehanna River. The Moose Run CDP includes part of the unincorporated community of Central City, and it is less than 0.5 miles (0.8 km) north of the borough of Milesburg. U.S. Route 220 Alternate runs between Milesburg and Moose Run, with an interchange at Pennsylvania Route 144/150, which connects with Moose Run Road, the main street through the CDP.

Historical population
Census	Pop.	Note	%±
2020	171		—
U.S. Decennial Census
