= Yarnell, Pennsylvania =

Unincorporated community in Pennsylvania, US

- Unincorporated community
- Location within Pennsylvania
- Coordinates: 40°59′52″N 77°48′39″W
- Country: United States
- State: Pennsylvania
- County: Centre
- Township: Boggs
- Elevation: 1,099 ft (335 m)
- Time zone: UTC-5 (Eastern (EST))
  - Summer (DST): UTC-4 (EDT)
- Area code: 814
- GNIS feature ID: 1191861

Yarnell is an unincorporated community in Boggs Township, Centre County, Pennsylvania, United States. According to a 2020 census, the population was approximately 83(48 males, 35 females). The land area is 0.1700 km^{2} with a population density of 488.2/km^{2} as of 2020. There was a 12% increase in annual population change from 2010 to 2020.
