= Boggs Township, Centre County, Pennsylvania =

Township in Pennsylvania, US

Coordinates: 40°54′48″N 77°45′53″W

- Township
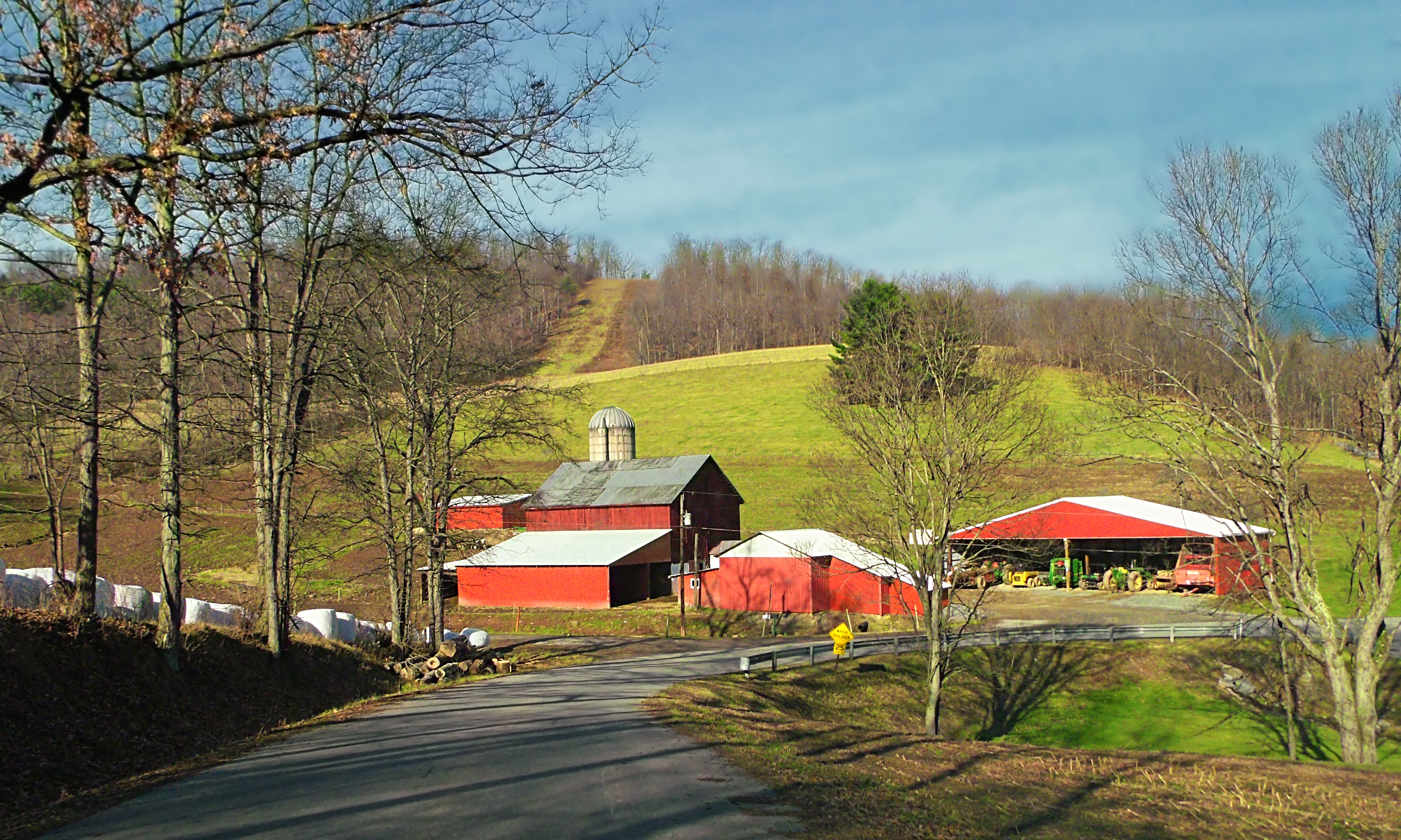
- A farm in Boggs Township

- Logo

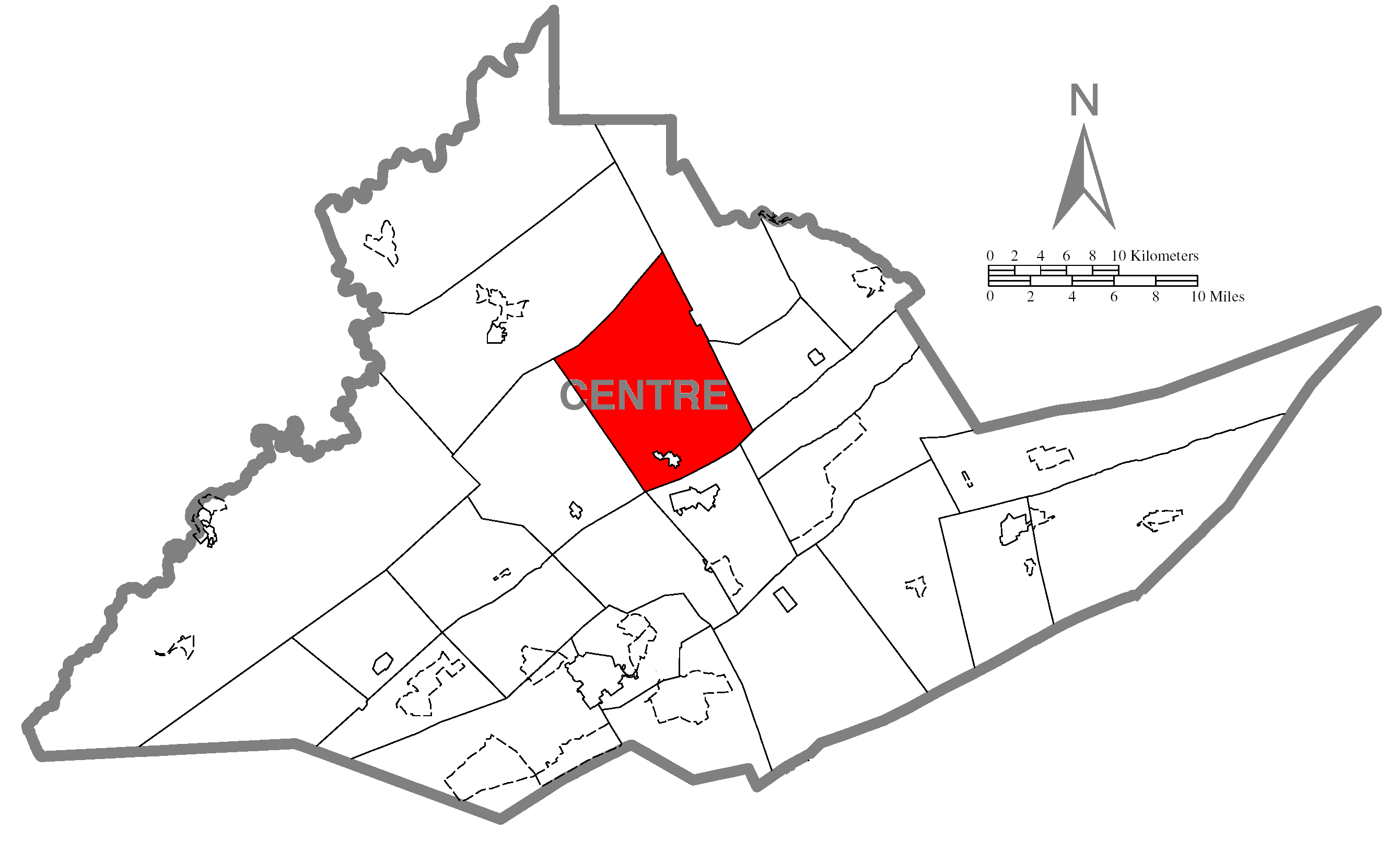
- Map of Centre County, Pennsylvania highlighting Boggs Township

- Map of Centre County, Pennsylvania
- Country: United States
- State: Pennsylvania
- County: Centre
- Settled: 1791
- Incorporated: 1814

Government
  - Type: Board of Supervisors
  - Chair: G. Daniel Woodring
  - Vice-chair: David J. Veneziano II
  - Supervisor: Terry L. Gates Jr.
  - Secretary/Treasurer: James L. Strunk

Area
  - Total: 51.62 sq mi (133.69 km^{2})
  - Land: 51.46 sq mi (133.29 km^{2})
  - Water: 0.15 sq mi (0.40 km^{2})

Population (2020)
  - Total: 2,737 ▼
  - Estimate (2021): 2,727
  - Density: 58.1/sq mi (22.45/km^{2})
- Time zone: UTC-5 (EST)
  - Summer (DST): UTC-4 (EDT)
- FIPS code: 42-027-07424
- Website: www.boggstownship.org

Historical population
Census	Pop.	Note	%±
2000	2,834		—
2010	2,985		5.3%
2020	2,737		−8.3%
2021 (est.)	2,727		−0.4%
U.S. Decennial Census

Boggs Township is a township in Centre County, Pennsylvania, United States. It is part of the State College, Pennsylvania Metropolitan Statistical Area. It is located north of Bellefonte at approximately . As of the 2010 census, the township population was 2,985.

== History ==
Curtin Village and Harmony Forge Mansion are listed on the National Register of Historic Places.

== Geography ==
Boggs Township is located north of the center of Centre County. It is bordered by Curtin and Howard townships to the northeast, Marion and Spring townships to the southeast, Union Township to the southwest, and Snow Shoe Township to the northwest. The borough of Milesburg is in the southern part of the township but is a separate municipality. Bellefonte, the county seat, is 2 miles (3 km) to the south. The census-designated places of Yarnell, Runville, Moose Run, Holters Crossing, Wingate are in the township.

According to the United States Census Bureau, the township has a total area of 51.6 square miles (133.7 km^{2}), of which 51.5 square miles (133.3 km^{2}) is land and 0.2 square miles (0.4 km^{2}), or 0.30%, is water.

Interstate 80 passes through the township, with access from Exit 158 (U.S. Route 220 Alternate) in the southern part of the township. Pennsylvania Route 144 crosses the township from south to north.

== Demographics ==
As of the census of 2000, there were 2,834 people, 1,056 households, and 811 families residing in the township. The population density was 51.3 inhabitants per square mile (19.8/km^{2}). There were 1,162 housing units at an average density of 21.1/sq mi (8.1/km^{2}). The racial makeup of the township was 98.66% White, 0.18% African American, 0.46% Native American, 0.04% Asian, 0.11% from other races, and 0.56% from two or more races. Hispanic or Latino of any race were 0.49% of the population.

There were 1,056 households, out of which 32.5% had children under the age of 18 living with them, 63.8% were married couples living together, 8.8% had a female householder with no husband present, and 23.2% were non-families. 19.4% of all households were made up of individuals, and 9.1% had someone living alone who was 65 years of age or older. The average household size was 2.64 and the average family size was 3.03.

In the township the population was spread out, with 24.0% under the age of 18, 8.3% from 18 to 24, 28.2% from 25 to 44, 27.7% from 45 to 64, and 11.8% who were 65 years of age or older. The median age was 38 years. For every 100 females, there were 100.6 males. For every 100 females age 18 and over, there were 101.3 males.

The median income for a household in the township was $40,168, and the median income for a family was $43,886. Males had a median income of $29,405 versus $23,028 for females. The per capita income for the township was $16,030. About 7.3% of families and 7.7% of the population were below the poverty line, including 8.0% of those under age 18 and 12.6% of those age 65 or over.
