= Frances Tipton Hunter =

American illustrator (1896–1957)

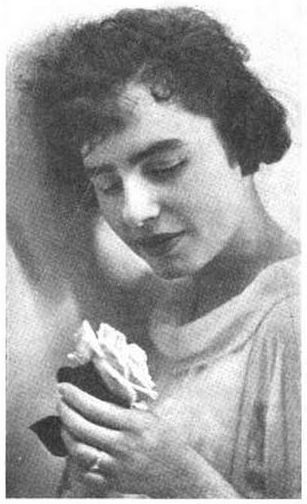
- Born: September 1, 1896; Howard, Pennsylvania
- Died: March 3, 1957 (aged 60); Philadelphia
- Education: Philadelphia Museum School of Industrial Art; Pennsylvania Academy of the Fine Arts
- Known for: Illustration

Frances Tipton Hunter (September 1, 1896 – March 3, 1957) was an illustrator who created covers for The Saturday Evening Post and many other magazines between the 1920s and 1950s. Her work is very similar in style to that of Norman Rockwell.

== Biography ==
Hunter was born in Howard, Pennsylvania, to Mitchell Matthew Hunter, an insurance salesman, and Laura Tipton. After her mother's death, Hunter and her older brother, Harold, moved in with her aunt and uncle Frances and Edward McEntire in Williamsport, Pennsylvania, when she was 5 or 6 years old.

Her love of drawing and art began when she was three years old; whenever she visited her grandmother, Hunter drew figures on the wallpaper in the stairway, apparently finding the wallpaper boring and unimpressive. Hunter remarked in an interview that "drawing is a perfectly natural thing, for the first impulse is to express one's self, and the easiest way for a child to do this is by pictures." She painted her first artwork in the 6th grade at Transeau Elementary School. Titled "We Bark for Transeau," the piece depicted three puppies in a basket. Puppies would become her favorite subject. While attending Williamsport High School, Hunter illustrated for the school's Cherry and White publication and played "unimpressive basketball," according to herself. In 1914, during her senior year, Hunter received first prize in a Williamsport Civic Club essay contest about her three favorite artworks at a James V. Brown Library art exhibition. The judges agreed that she best interpreted the artists' meaning of the paintings.

After graduation, Hunter studied illustration under Thornton Oakley at the Philadelphia Museum School of Industrial Art. She then attended the Pennsylvania Academy of the Fine Arts and the Samuel S. Fleisher Art Memorial. While studying in Philadelphia, Hunter was hired by John Wanamaker to illustrate a line of children's fashion for catalogs and advertisements. She was paid $500. While illustrating in the children's fashion industry, Hunter was sent the actual clothes in order to paint the necessary details of the garment accurately. She moved back to Williamsport for about six years, before returning to Philadelphia. While in Williamsport for the 1956 Sesquicentennial, Hunter was named one of the first Pennsylvania ambassadors by the state Chamber of Commerce, and was named "A Distinguished Daughter of Williamsport."

With an artistic style similar to Norman Rockwell's, Hunter's watercolors delightfully captured nature at its best. Her favorite subject was children and their pets. Due to her talent and the characters she created, Hunter became the "most popular and best-selling calendar artist" of the 1940–50s." Her memorable subjects were "welcome therapy to millions recovering from the dreariness of WWII." In the early 1920s, Hunter created a series of paper dolls that first appeared in Ladies' Home Journal. After rave reviews and requests, she illustrated six dolls to appear in the regular publications. From the 1930s to the 1940s, Hunter contributed 18 covers to the Saturday Evening Post.

In 1946, Hunter was approached by John Baurngarth to do a series of paintings depicting the everyday problems of a little boy and his dog. The series, "Sandy in Trouble," continued for 11 years, as Hunter created an annual painting to add to the series. During her lifetime, she illustrated and published two books, Random House's Boo, Who Used to Be Scared of the Dark, and The Frances Tipton Hunter Picture Book. Whitman Publishing Company of Racine, Wisconsin published The Picture Book, which featured Hunter's illustrations and verses/stories by Marjorie Barrows. She was listed in the Who's Who in American Art from 1936 to 1956 and was a member of the Society of Illustrators. The Pennsylvania State University, University of Minnesota, James V. Brown Library in Williamsport, and the Thomas T. Taber Museum of the Lycoming County Historical Society all own artworks by Hunter.

After a year long illness, Frances Tipton Hunter died on March 3, 1957, at the Philadelphia Jefferson Hospital. She is buried in Howard, Pennsylvania.

== List of publications with Hunter's illustrations ==
- Woman's Home Companion
- Redbook
- Good Housekeeping
- Cosmopolitan
- Saturday Evening Post
- Ladies' Home Journal
- Pictorial Review
- Delineator
- Collier's Magazine
- National Weekly

== List of companies Hunter illustrated for ==
- Asher's Knit Goods
- Lambert Pharmacal (Listerine)
- National Carbon Company (Eveready Products)
- Firestone Tire and Rubber Company
- Westinghouse Lamp Company
- Oppenheimer Casing Company

== List of illustration titles ==
- "Queen of May"
- "Little Arthur"
- "Beating the Heat"
- "No Money for Soda/Girl and Boy at Soda Fountain", Saturday Evening Post cover, June 6, 1936, issue.
- "Boys in Principal's Office"
- "Here Boy!"
- "Boy and Girl at Candy Counter"
- "Little Boy and Winter Underwear"

Hunter sketched this illustration from life in a Philadelphia department store in 1937. She waited for hours for the right subjects, then the cover's pair walked in the store. She furiously sketched, capturing the boy's moment of disgust when the wooly, scratchy long underwear was held up.

- "Girl and Boy on School Steps"
- "Kids Riding Trolley"
- Sketch by Hunter to accompany Ogden Nash's poem, "Remembrance of Things to Come"
