= Curtin Village =

- U.S. National Register of Historic Places
- U.S. Historic district
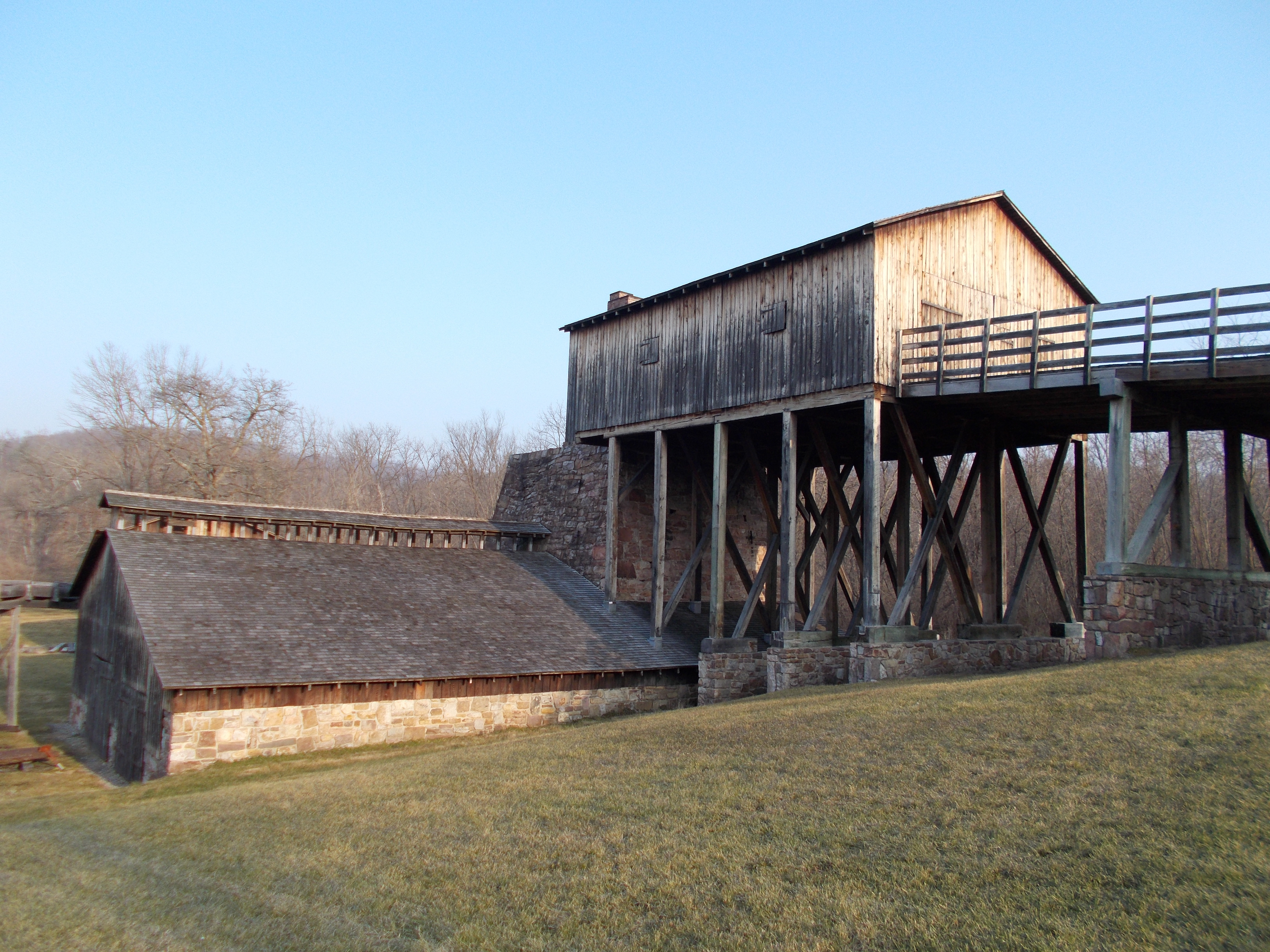
- Eagle Ironworks, Curtin Village, December 2012

- Location within Pennsylvania Location within the United States
- Location: Off U.S. 220, Boggs Township, Boggs Township, Pennsylvania
- Coordinates: 40°58′26″N 77°44′33″W
- Area: 155.1 acres (62.8 ha)
- Built: 1810
- Architectural style: Late Victorian, Federal
- NRHP reference No.: 71000687
- Added to NRHP: March 11, 1971

Curtin Village, also known as Eagle Ironworks, is a national historic district located in Boggs Township, Centre County, Pennsylvania. The district includes eighteen contributing buildings and three contributing structures in Curtin.

== History and features ==
This historic district is composed of buildings and structures related to an ironworks dating back to 1810, when the village was founded by Roland Curtin, Sr., father of Pennsylvania's Civil War-era governor Andrew Gregg Curtin, and Miles Boggs. It includes an iron master's mansion (1830), a late-19th century Victorian style dwelling, the Eagle Furnace stack (1847), the remains of a grist mill, a number of worker's houses, and an overgrown canal basin. The Eagle Ironworks closed in 1921.

The area continues to be conserved by historic preservationists. Owned by the Pennsylvania Historical and Museum Commission, it is operated as the Curtin Village at Eagle Ironworks Historical Site by the Roland Curtin Foundation.

It was added to the National Register of Historic Places in 1971.

== Gallery ==
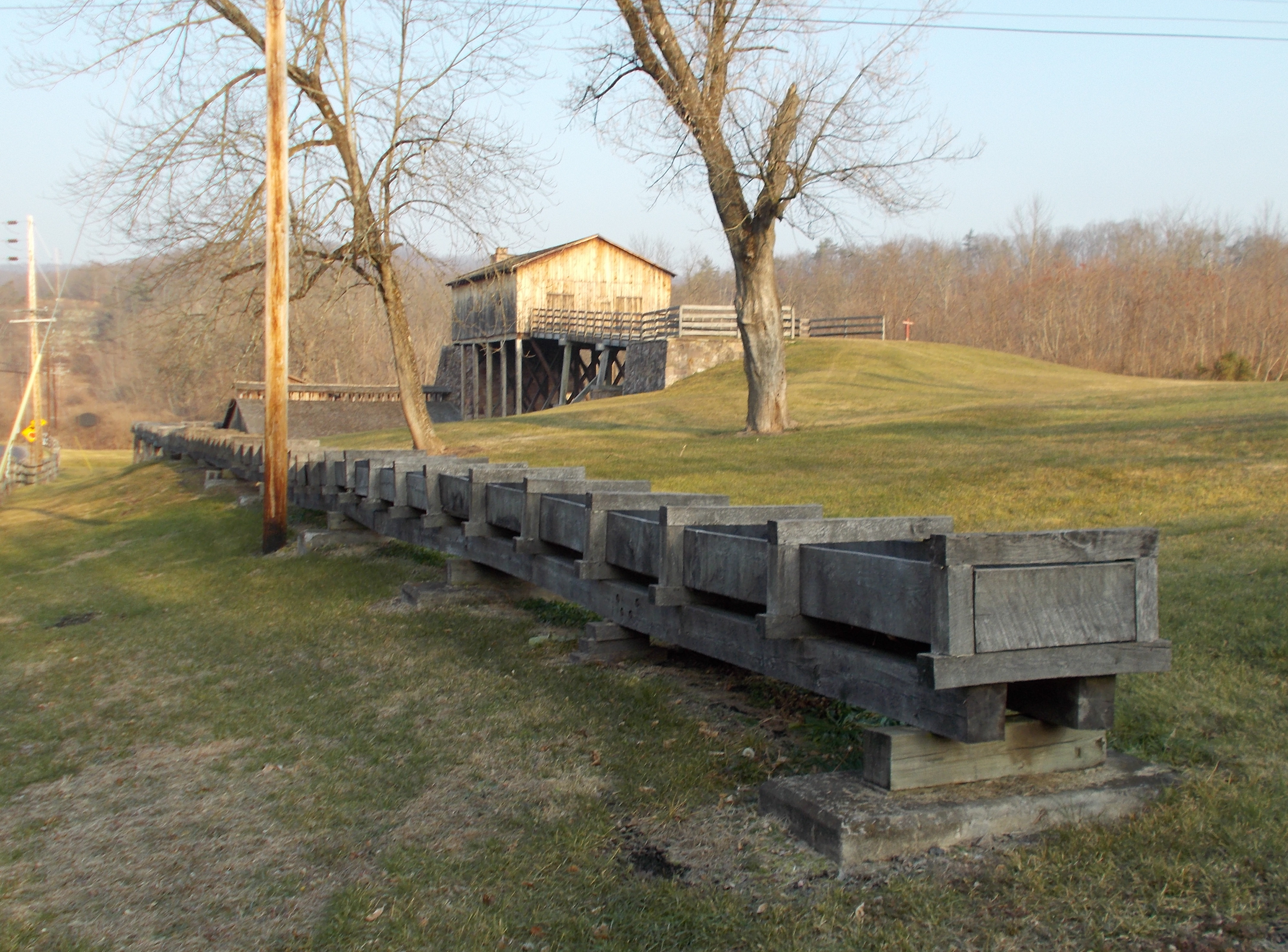
Sluice at Eagle Ironworks, December 2012

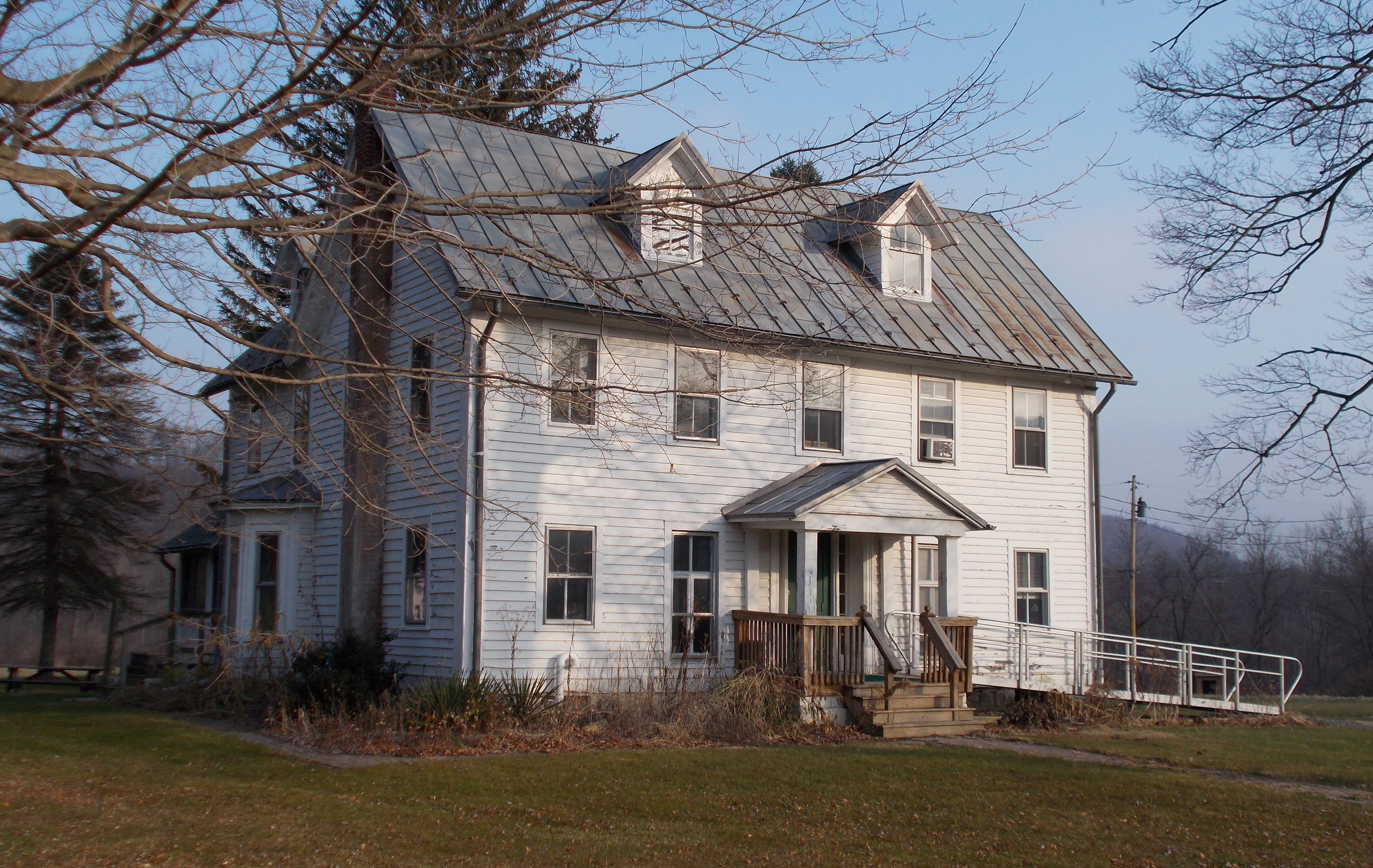
Victorian-era dwelling at Eagle Ironworks, December 2012

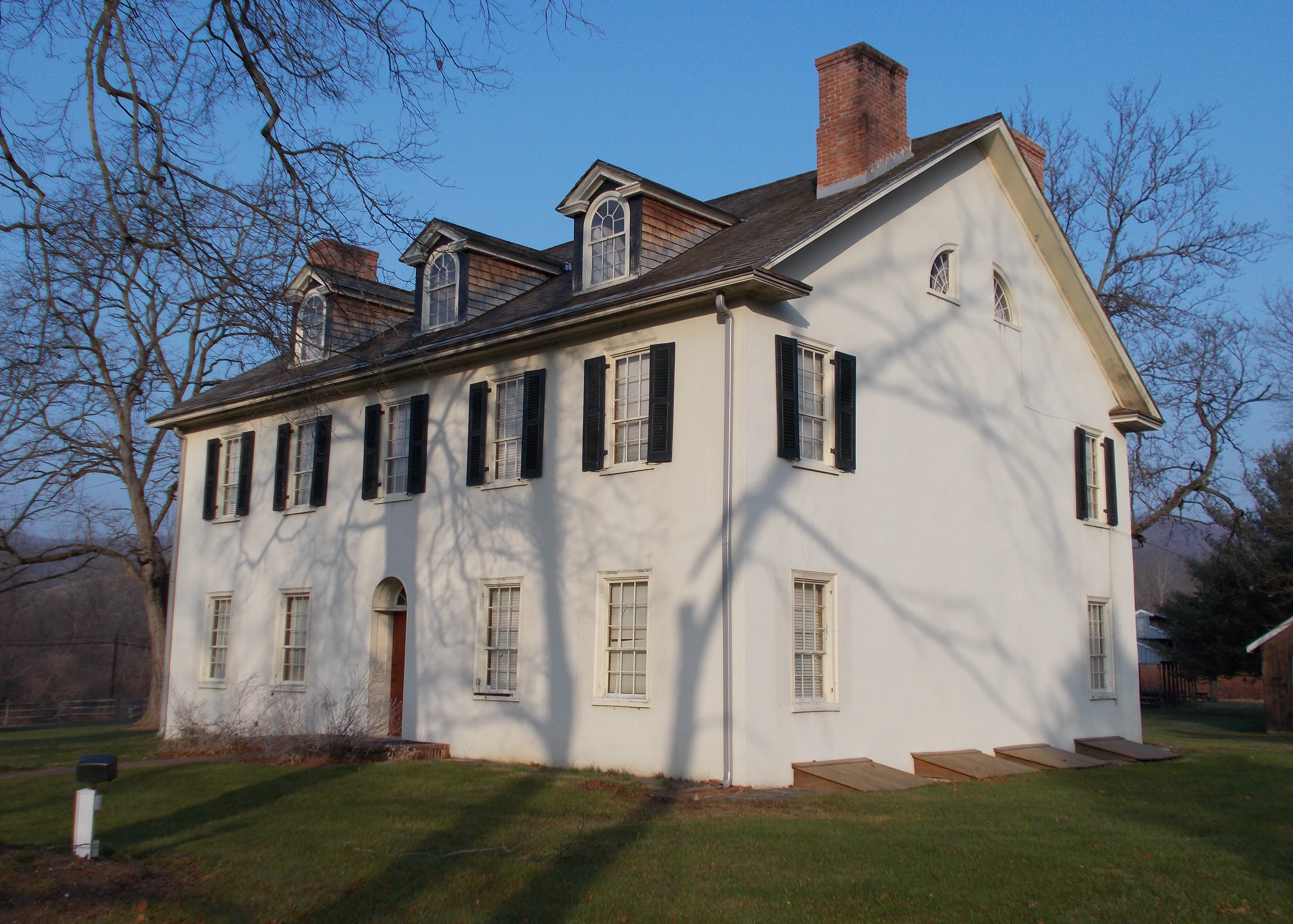
Ironmaster's Mansion at Eagle Ironworks, December 2012

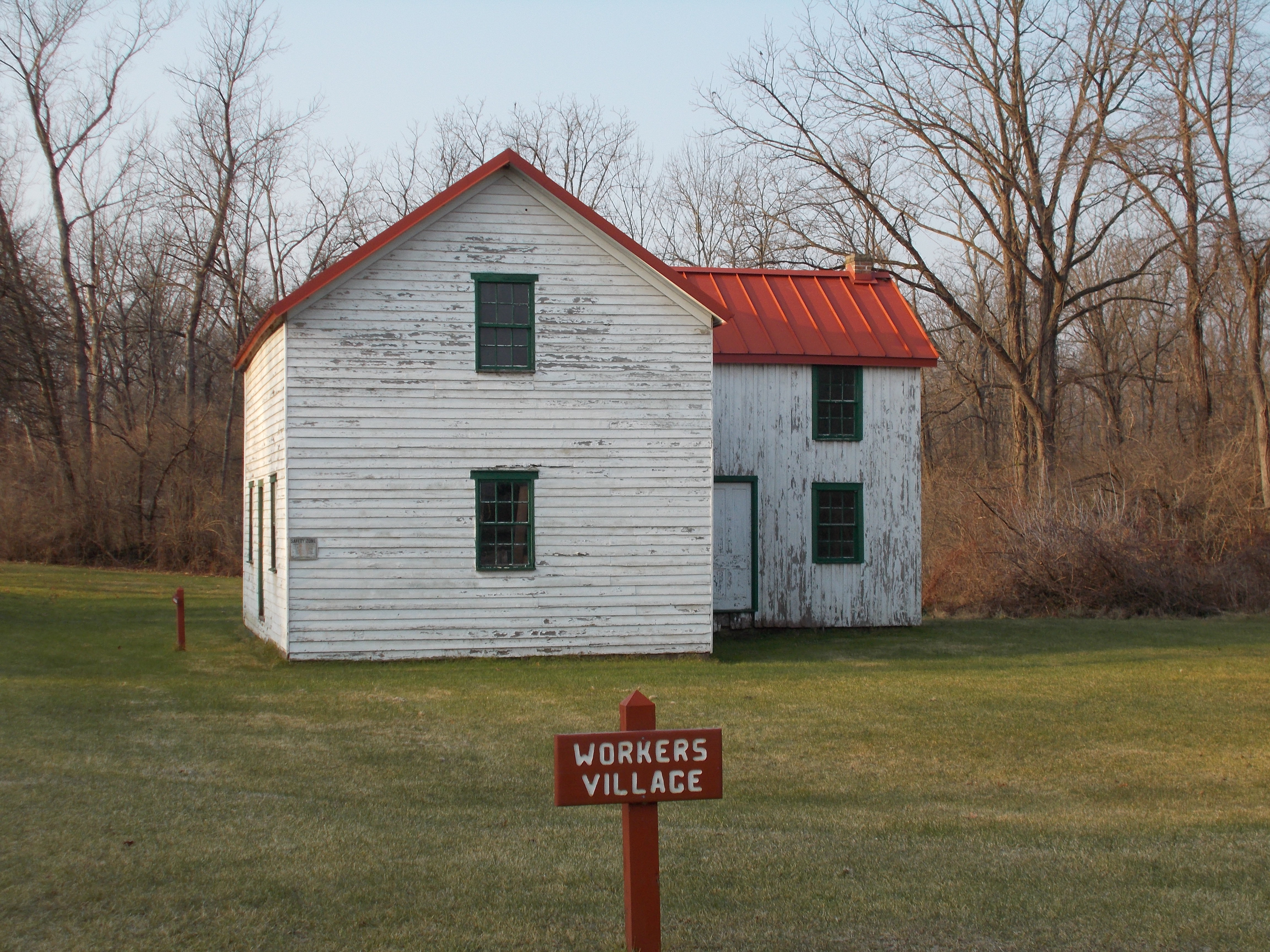
Worker's house at Eagle Ironworks, December 2012

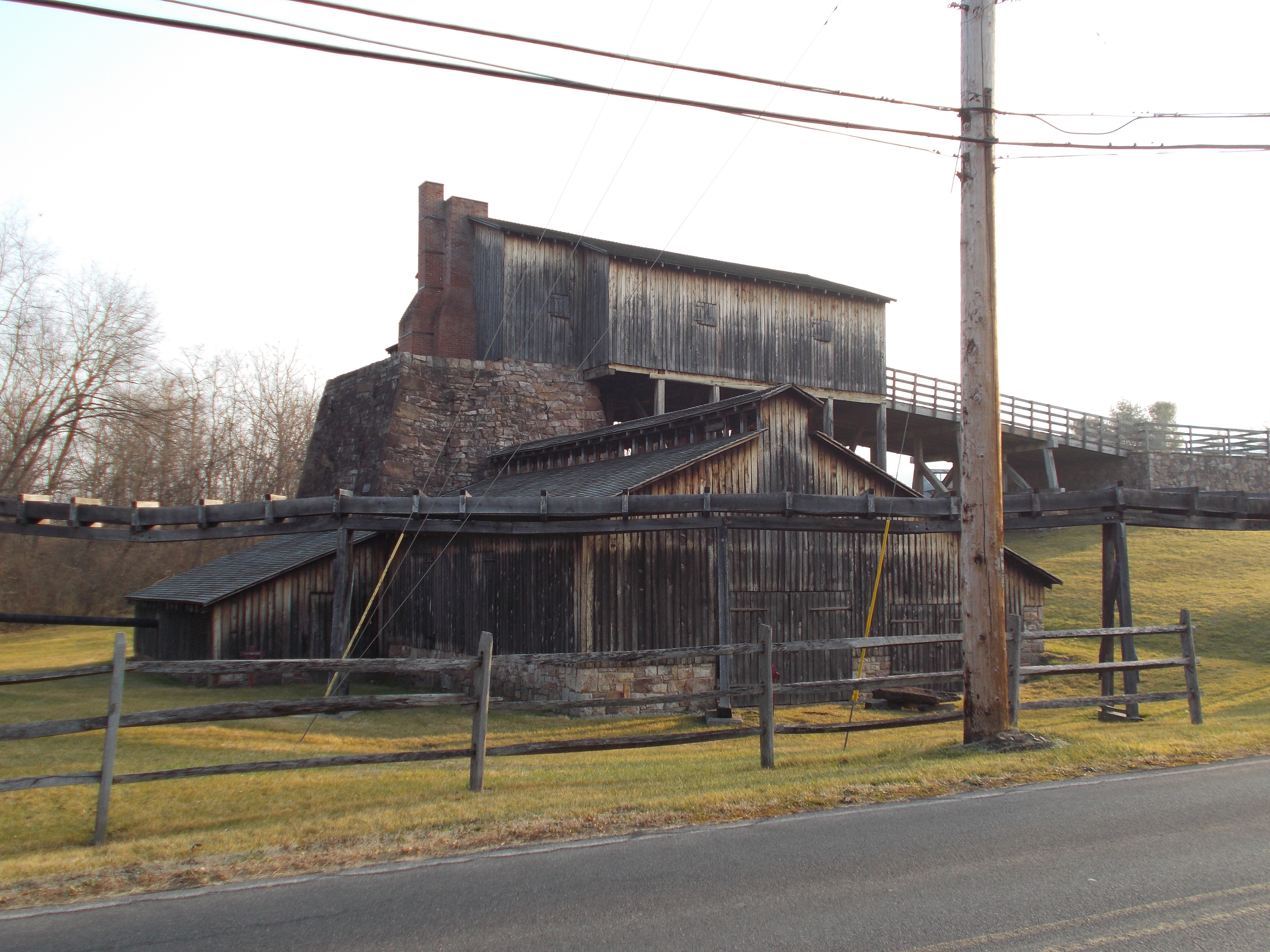
Eagle Ironworks Alternate View, December 2012
