= Iddings-Baldridge House =

Historic house in Pennsylvania, United States

- U.S. National Register of Historic Places
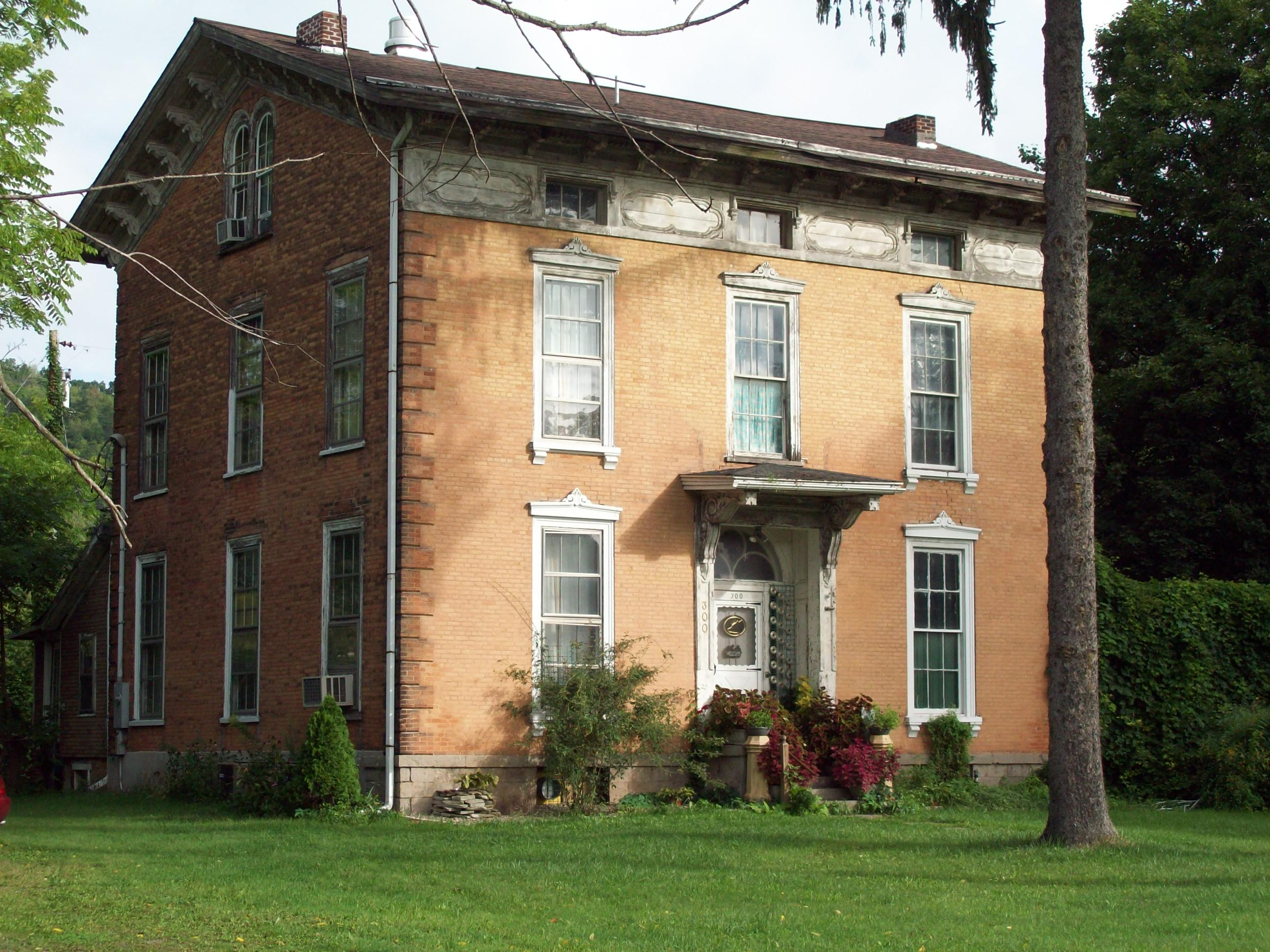
- Iddings-Baldridge House in August 2010

- Location within Pennsylvania Location within the United States
- Location: Railroad St., Milesburg, Pennsylvania
- Coordinates: 40°56′34″N 77°47′47″W
- Area: 0.1 acres (0.040 ha)
- Built: c. 1860
- Architect: Iddings, Austin
- Architectural style: Greek Revival, Georgian, and Gothic Revival
- NRHP reference No.: 77001145
- Added to NRHP: July 29, 1977

The Iddings-Baldridge House is an historic home that is located in Milesburg in Centre County, Pennsylvania, United States.

It was added to the National Register of Historic Places in 1977.

== History and architectural features ==
Built circa 1860, this historic home is a 2 1/2-story, rectangular brick building. It has a number of Greek Revival-style details, including a low-pitched, gable roof, a square plan, and a frieze beneath the eaves. The interior has a traditional Georgian center hall plan. Also located on the property is a Gothic Revival-style outbuilding.
