= Harmony Forge Mansion =

Historic house in Pennsylvania, United States

- U.S. National Register of Historic Places
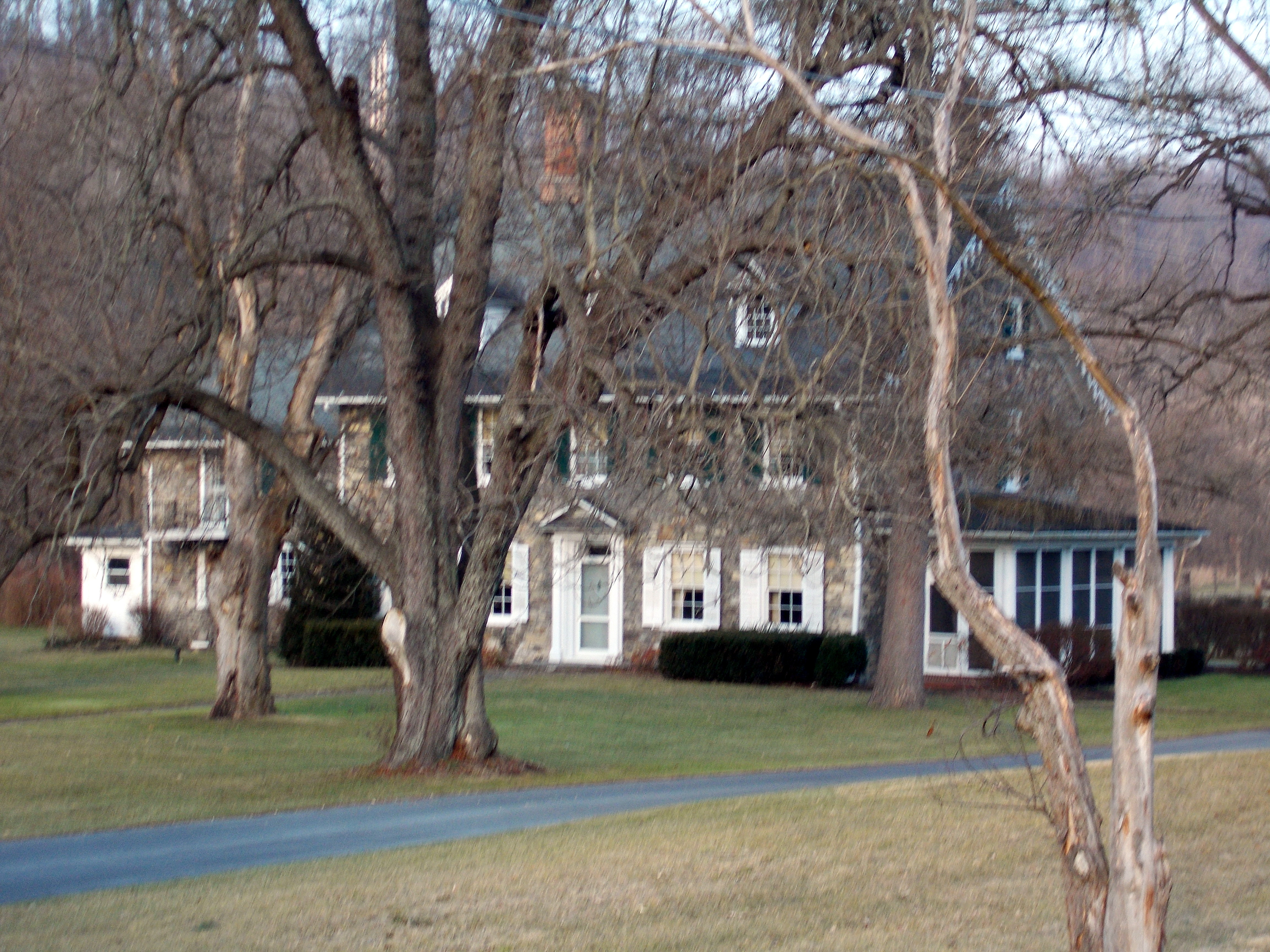
- Harmony Forge Mansion, December 2012

- Location within Pennsylvania Location within the United States
- Location: South of Milesburg on Pennsylvania Route 144, Boggs Township, Pennsylvania
- Coordinates: 40°56′5″N 77°47′12″W
- Area: 32 acres (13 ha)
- Built: c. 1810-1820, c. 1847
- NRHP reference No.: 79002183
- Added to NRHP: October 16, 1979

The Harmony Forge Mansion is an historic home and property which is located in Bellefonte, Centre County, Pennsylvania.

It was added to the National Register of Historic Places in 1979.

== History and architectural features ==
Originally the site of the Harmony Forge/Milesburg Iron Works, today the Harmony Forge Mansion survives, along with a large antique barn and a number of other outbuildings. Although the mansion was built between 1810 and 1820 by Joseph Miles, the Harmony Forge property dates back to the 1790s. The site is a landmark of the charcoal iron industry that prospered in Central Pennsylvania following the conclusion of the Revolutionary War. The iron forge was erected in 1795, on property purchased by Colonel Samuel Miles. Construction was supervised by ironmaster John Dunlop and the firm of Miles, Patton and Miles. The construction of the mansion followed sometime thereafter, and can be dated to sometime between 1796 and 1820. Colonel Miles never settled in Centre County, instead sending his sons John and Joseph to manage the forge and lay out the town of "Milesborough", now Milesburg, circa 1793.
