= Foster J. Sayers =

Foster Joseph Sayers
- Born: April 27, 1924; Howard, Pennsylvania, US
- Died: November 12, 1944 (aged 20); Thionville, France
- Military career
- Allegiance: United States
- Branch: United States Army
- Service years: 1943–1944
- Rank: Private First Class
- Units: 357th Infantry, 90th Infantry Division
- Conflicts: World War II
- Awards: Medal of Honor

Foster Joseph Sayers (April 27, 1924 – November 12, 1944) was a 20-year-old infantryman from Centre County. He joined the Army from Howard, Pennsylvania in March 1943.

He received the Medal of Honor for acts of bravery near Thionville, France, on November 12, 1944.

== Medal of Honor citation ==
Private First Class, U.S. Army, Company L, 357th Infantry, 90thInfantry Division. Entered service at: Howard, Pa. Birth: Marsh Creek, Pa. Place and date: Near Thionville, France, November 12, 1944. Killed in action. G.O. No.: 89, October 19, 1945.

Citation:

He displayed conspicuous gallantry above and beyond the call of duty in combat on 12 November 1944, near Thionville, France. During an attack on strong hostile forces entrenched on a hill he fearlessly ran up the steep approach toward his objective and set up his machinegun 20 yards from the enemy. Realizing it would be necessary to attract full attention of the dug-in Germans while his company crossed an open area and flanked the enemy, he picked up his gun, charged through withering machinegun and rifle fire to the very edge of the emplacement, and there killed 12 German soldiers with devastating close-range fire. He took up a position behind a log and engaged the hostile infantry from the flank in an heroic attempt to distract their attention while his comrades attained their objective at the crest of the hill. He was killed by the very heavy concentration of return fire; but his fearless assault enabled his company to sweep the hill with minimum of casualties, killing or capturing every enemy soldier on it. Pfc. Sayers' indomitable fighting spirit, aggressiveness, and supreme devotion to duty live on as an example of the highest traditions of the military service.

== See also ==
- List of Medal of Honor recipients
- List of Medal of Honor recipients for World War II
