= Milesburg, Pennsylvania =

Borough in Pennsylvania, US

- Borough
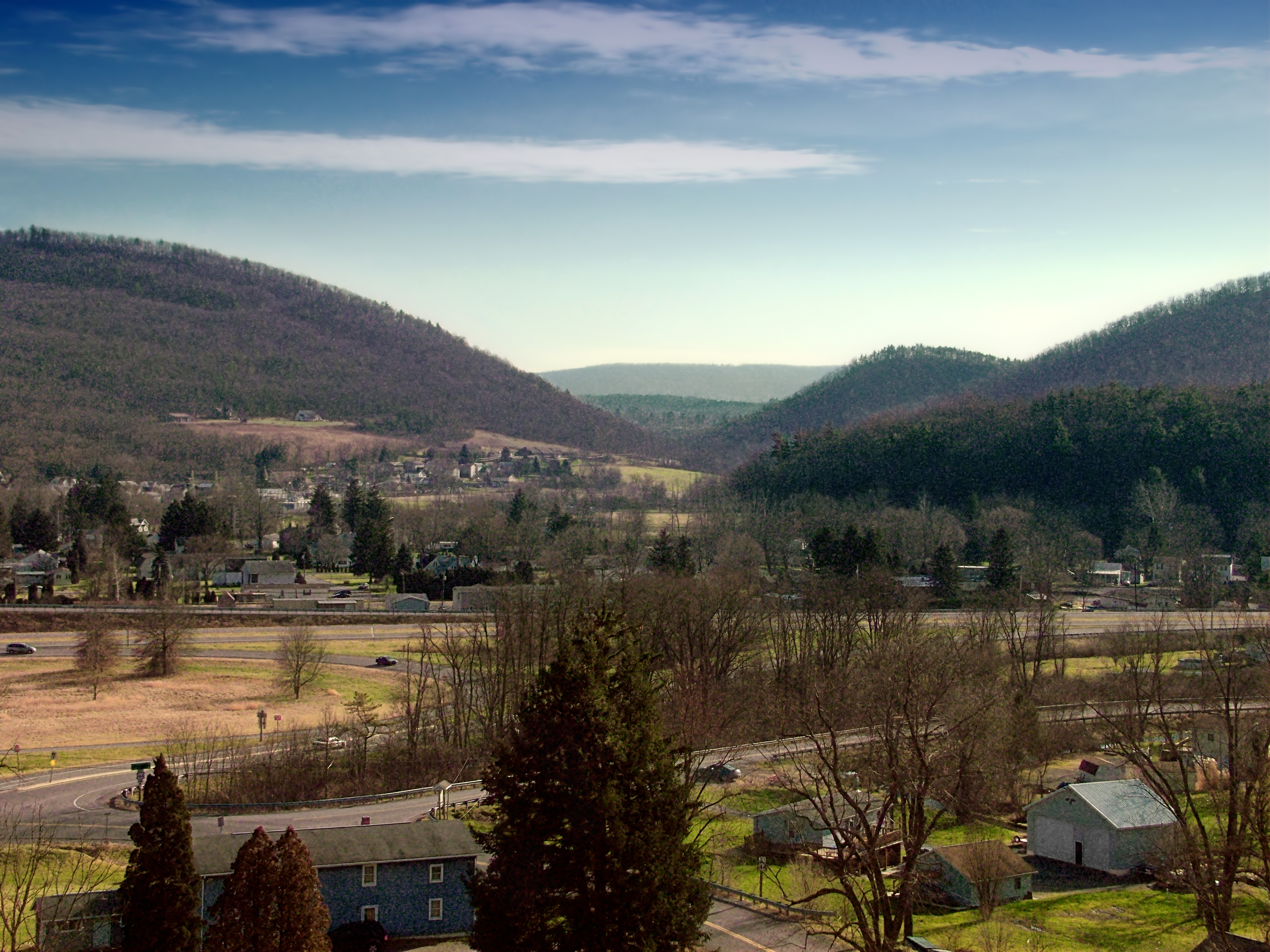
- Milesburg in December 2011

- Location of Milesburg in Centre County, Pennsylvania

- Location of Centre County in Pennsylvania

- Location within Pennsylvania Location within the United States
- Coordinates: 40°56′33″N 77°47′21″W
- Country: United States
- State: Pennsylvania
- County: Centre
- Settled: 1793
- Incorporated (borough): 1843

Government
  - Mayor: Clair Martin

Area
  - Total: 0.44 sq mi (1.13 km^{2})
  - Land: 0.44 sq mi (1.13 km^{2})
  - Water: 0 sq mi (0.00 km^{2})
- Elevation: 692 ft (211 m)

Population (2020)
  - Total: 1,093
  - Density: 2,501.9/sq mi (965.97/km^{2})
- Time zone: Eastern (EST)
  - Summer (DST): EDT
- Zip Code: 16853
- Area code: 814
- FIPS code: 42-49368

Milesburg is a borough in Centre County, Pennsylvania. It is part of the State College, Pennsylvania metropolitan statistical area. The population was 1,093 at the 2020 census.

== History ==
Milesburg and nearby Miles Township were named after Samuel Miles, who co-owned the Centre Furnace Iron Works, along with Colonel John Patton and John Dunlop.

Milesburg is located near the site of a former Lenape Indian settlement known as Bald Eagle's Nest.

Iddings-Baldridge House in Milesburg was added to the National Register of Historic Places in 1977.

== Geography ==
Milesburg is located at 40°56′33″N 77°47′21″W (40.942533, -77.789207).

According to the U.S. Census Bureau, the borough has a total area of 0.4 square miles (1.0 km^{2}), all land.

== Demographics ==
Historical population
Census	Pop.	Note	%±
1850	478		—
1860	591		23.6%
1870	600		1.5%
1880	643		7.2%
1890	714		11.0%
1900	594		−16.8%
1910	531		−10.6%
1920	545		2.6%
1930	644		18.2%
1940	681		5.7%
1950	733		7.6%
1960	729		−0.5%
1970	1,196		64.1%
1980	1,309		9.4%
1990	1,144		−12.6%
2000	1,187		3.8%
2010	1,123		−5.4%
2020	1,093		−2.7%

At the 2010 census there were 1,123 people, 459 households, and 305 families residing in the borough. The population density was 2,503.4 inhabitants per square mile (966.6/km^{2}). There were 489 housing units at an average density of 1,090.1 per square mile (420.9/km^{2}). The racial makeup of the borough was 98.7% White, 0.4% Black or African American, 0.1% Native American, 0.4% Asian, 0.2% other, and 0.2% from other races. Hispanic or Latino of any race were 0.3%.

There were 459 households, 29.8% had children under the age of 18 living with them, 47.3% were married couples living together, 6.2% had a male householder with no wife present, 12.9% had a female householder with no husband present, and 33.6% were non-families. 26.6% of households were made up of individuals, and 8.5% were one person aged 65 or older. The average household size was 2.45 and the average family size was 2.77.

In the borough, the population was spread out, with 19.1% under the age of 18, 8.8% from 18 to 24, 25.3% from 25 to 44, 29.3% from 45 to 64, and 17.5% 65 or older. The median age was 42 years. For every 100 females there were 89.1 males. For every 100 females age 18 and over, there were 87.8 males.

The median household income was $45,588 and the median family income was $51,597. The per capita income for the borough was $19,310. About 5.0% of families and 7.2% of the population were below the poverty line, including 1.7% of those under age 18 and 3.4% of those age 65 or over.

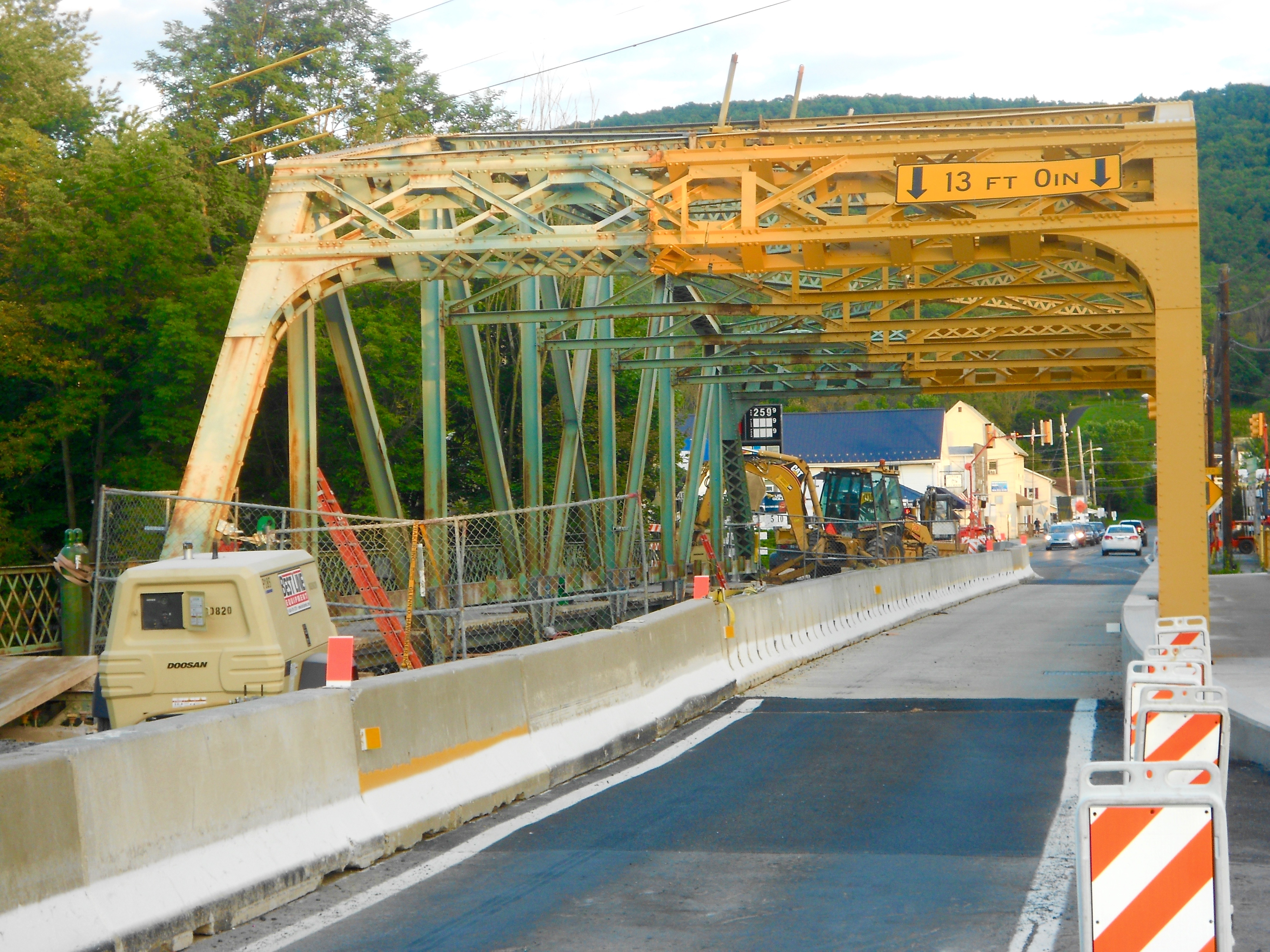
Bridge repairs

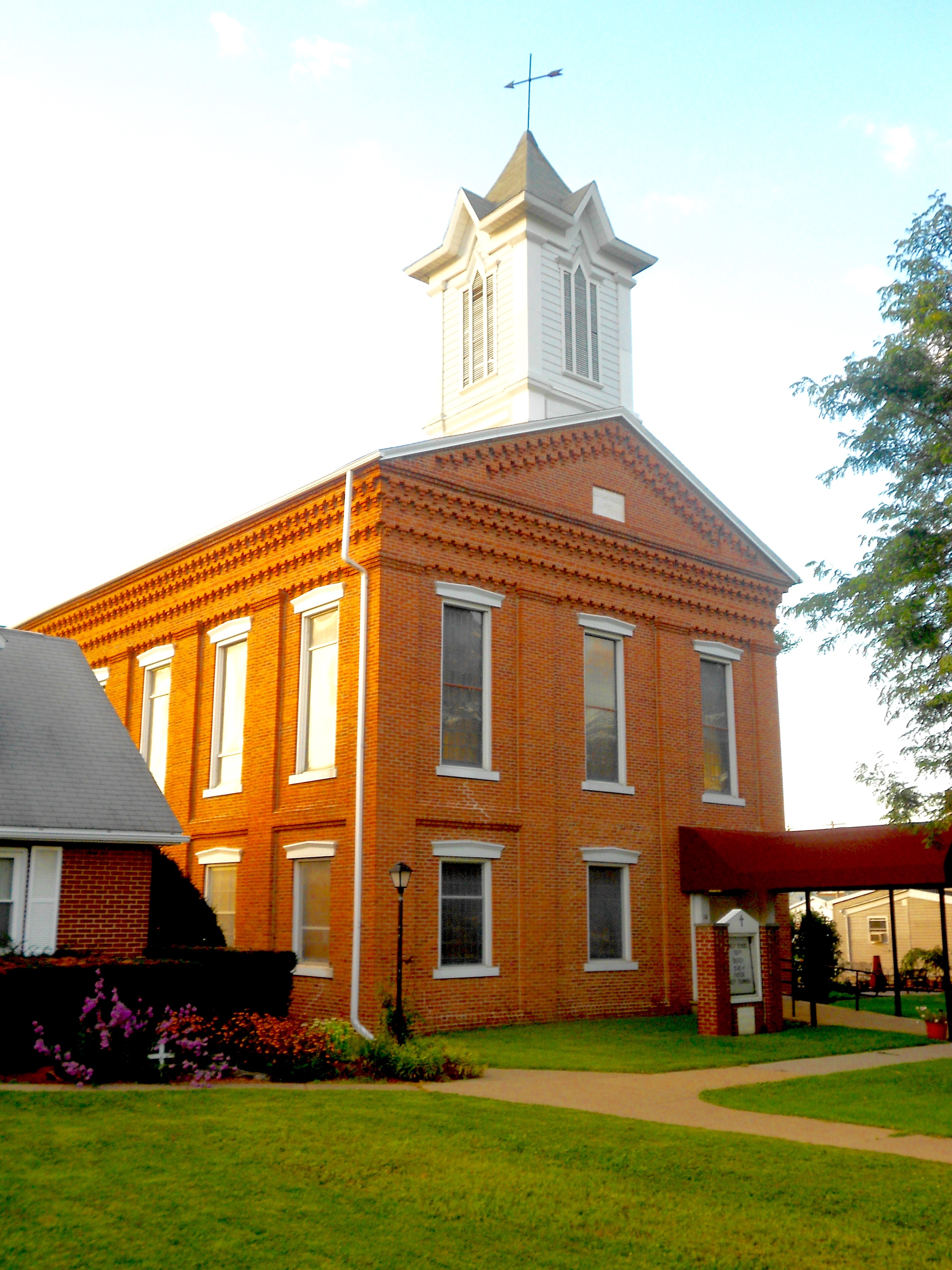
Baptist Church

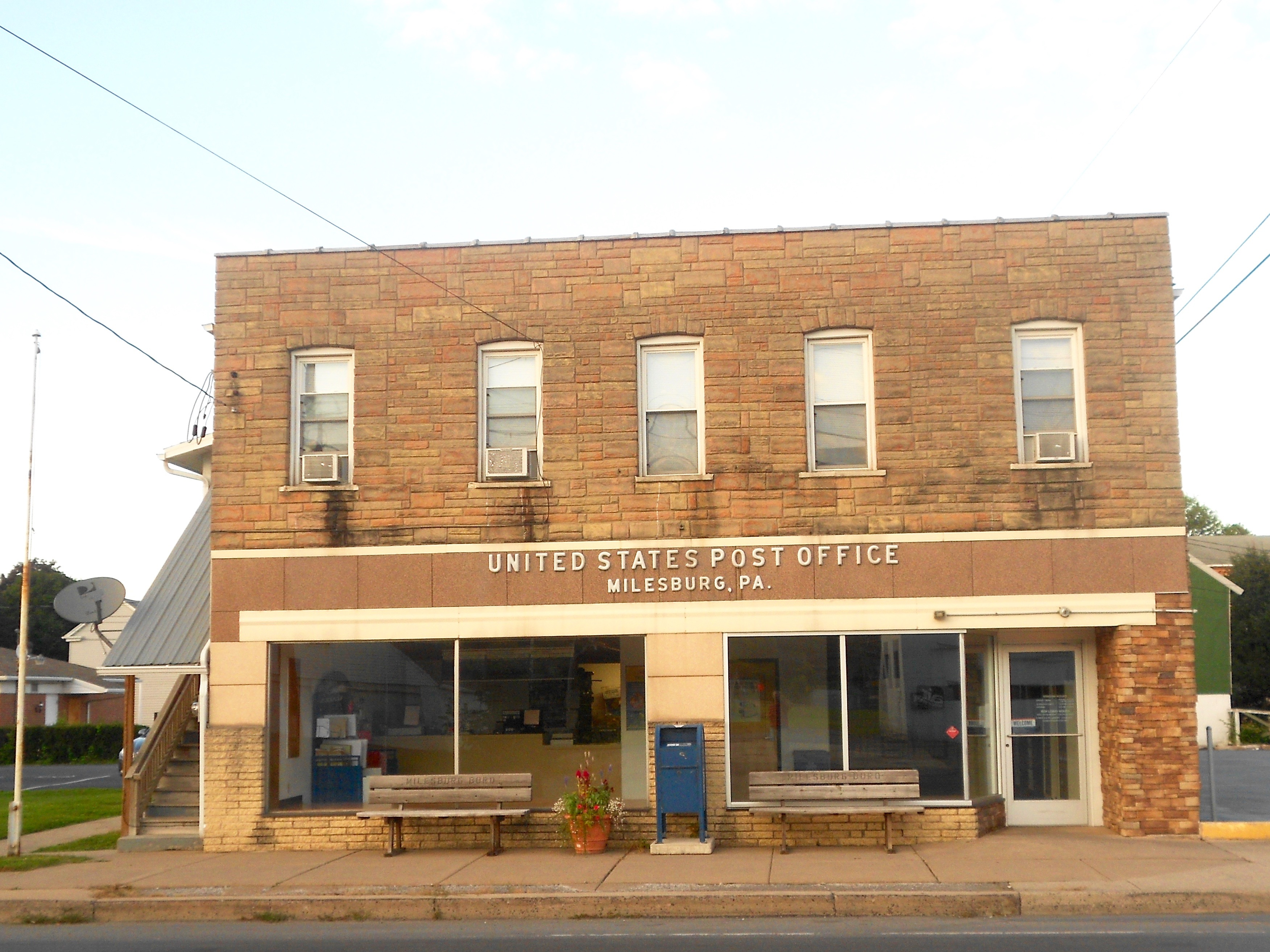
Post office

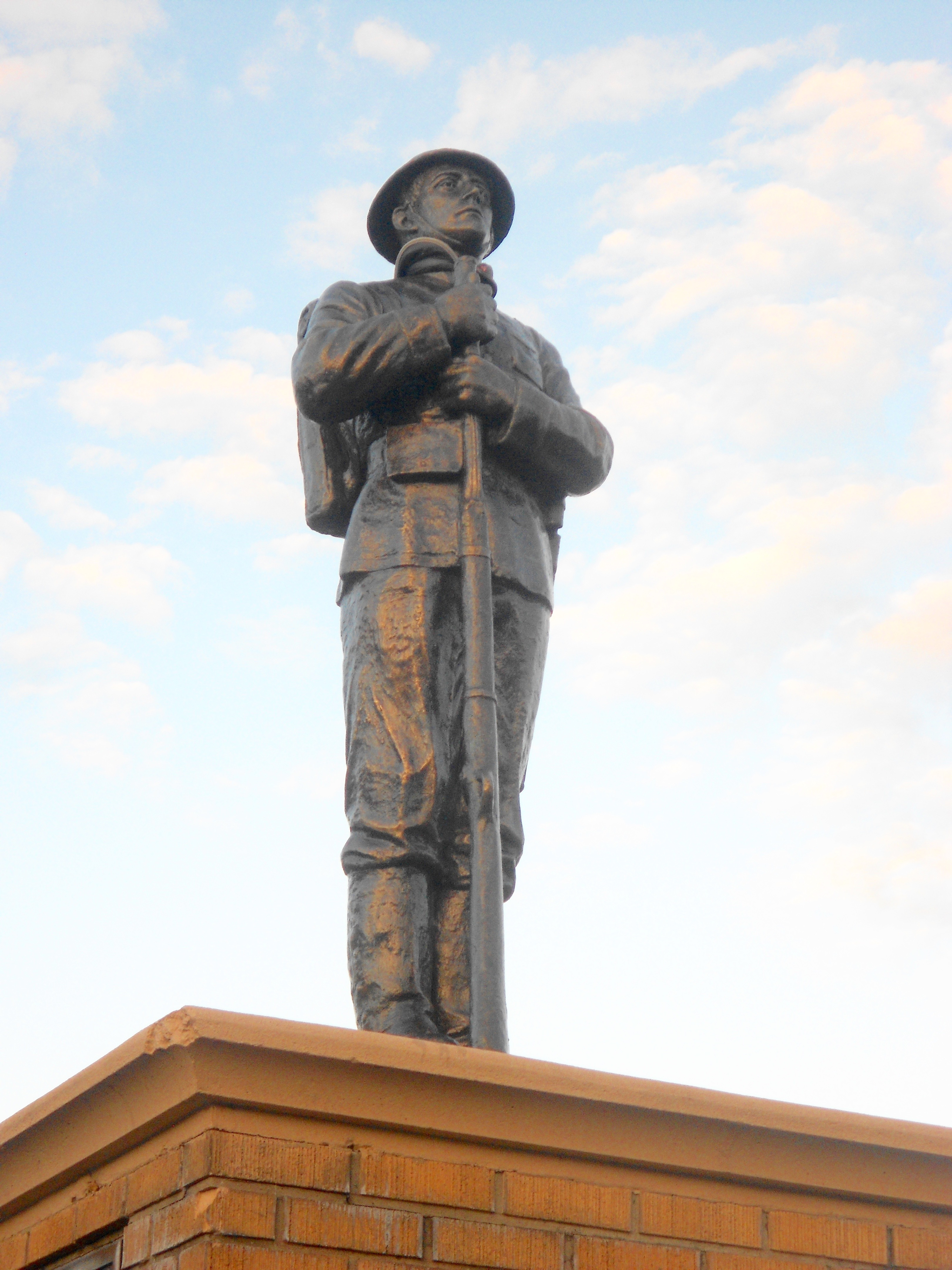
All Wars Memorial
