= Howard, Pennsylvania =

Borough in Pennsylvania, US

- Borough
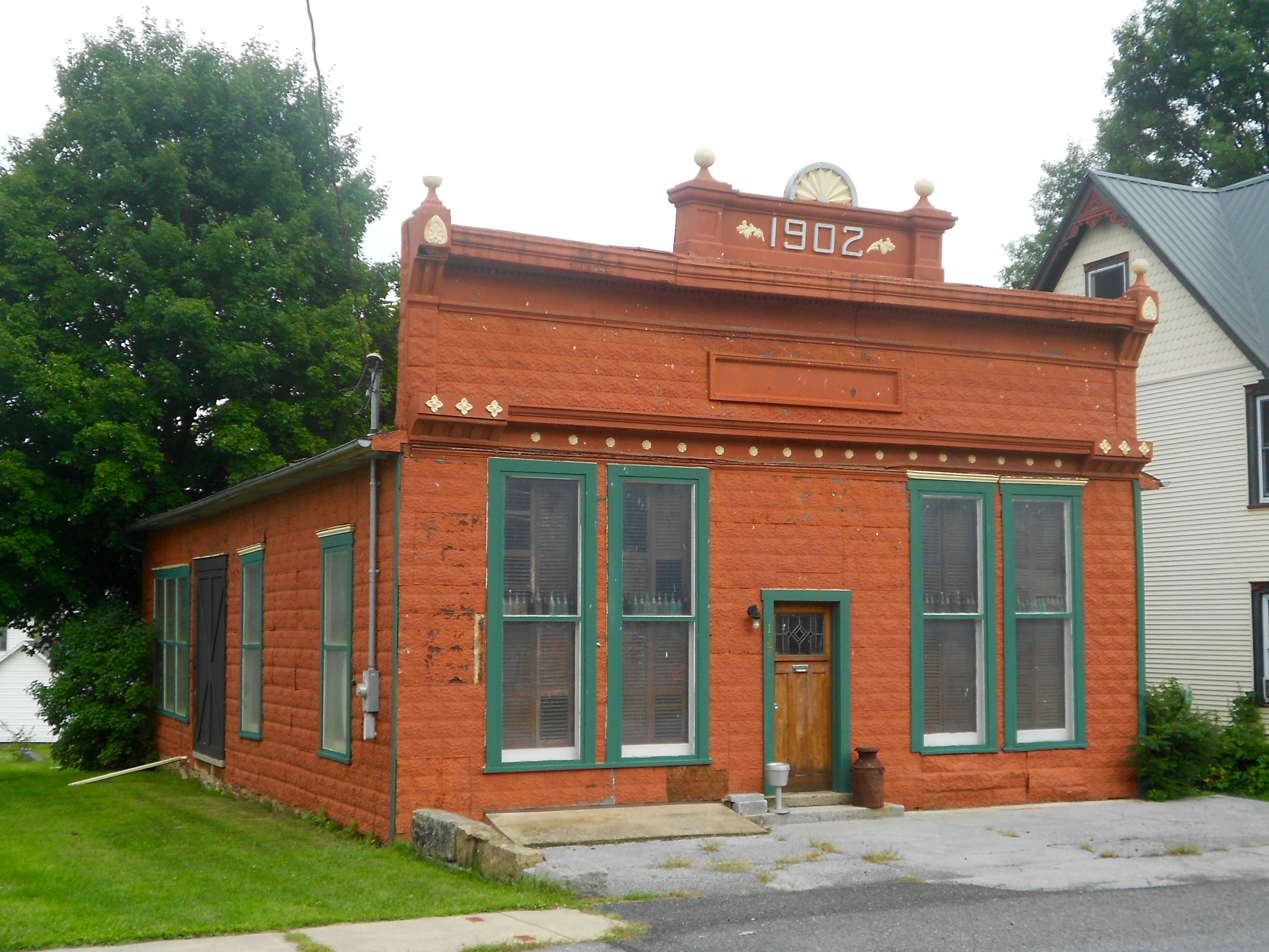
- 1902 building across from Borough Park

- Seal

- Location of Howard in Centre County, Pennsylvania.

- Location within Pennsylvania Location within the United States
- Coordinates: 41°00′50″N 77°39′17″W
- Country: United States
- State: Pennsylvania
- County: Centre
- Settled: 1770
- Incorporated (borough): 1864

Area
  - Total: 0.37 sq mi (0.95 km^{2})
  - Land: 0.36 sq mi (0.94 km^{2})
  - Water: 0 sq mi (0.00 km^{2})
- Elevation: 696 ft (212 m)

Population (2020)
  - Total: 687
  - Density: 1,900/sq mi (730/km^{2})
- Time zone: Eastern (EST)
  - Summer (DST): EDT
- Zip code: 16841
- Area code: 814
- FIPS code: 42-35960
- Website: howardborough.com

Howard is a borough in Centre County, Pennsylvania, United States. It is part of the State College, Pennsylvania Metropolitan Statistical Area. The population was 687 at the 2020 census.

== Geography ==
Howard is located at 41°0′50″N 77°39′17″W (41.013857, -77.654809). Howard is surrounded by Howard Township.

According to the United States Census Bureau, the borough has a total area of 0.3 square miles (0.78 km^{2}), all land.

== Demographics ==
Historical population
Census	Pop.	Note	%±
1870	334		—
1880	498		49.1%
1890	554		11.2%
1900	563		1.6%
1910	667		18.5%
1920	621		−6.9%
1930	664		6.9%
1940	726		9.3%
1950	754		3.9%
1960	770		2.1%
1970	751		−2.5%
1980	838		11.6%
1990	749		−10.6%
2000	699		−6.7%
2010	720		3.0%
2020	687		−4.6%

At the 2020 census there were 687 people, 290 households, and 204 families in the borough. The population density was 2,083.1 inhabitants per square mile (804.3/km^{2}). There were 311 housing units at an average density of 899.8 per square mile (347.4/km^{2}). The racial makeup of the borough was 97.5% White, 0.4% Black or African American, 0.3% Asian, 0.7% other, and 1.1% of two or more races. Hispanic or Latino of any race were 1.4%.

There were 290 households, 33.1% had children under the age of 18 living with them, 56.2% were married couples living together, 3.4% had a male householder with no wife present, 10.7% had a female householder with no husband present, and 29.7% were non-families. 22.4% of households were made up of individuals, and 11.0% were one person aged 65 or older. The average household size was 2.48 and the average family size was 2.89.

The age distribution was 23.2% under the age of 18, 6.9% from 18 to 24, 28.4% from 25 to 44, 27.5% from 45 to 64, and 14.0% 65 or older. The median age was 40 years. For every 100 females there were 105.1 males. For every 100 females age 18 and over, there were 99.6 males.

The median household income was $51,548 and the median family income was $54,107. The per capita income for the borough was $25,304. About 5.9% of families and 8.0% of the population were below the poverty line, including 7.4% of those under age 18 and 13.6% of those age 65 or over.

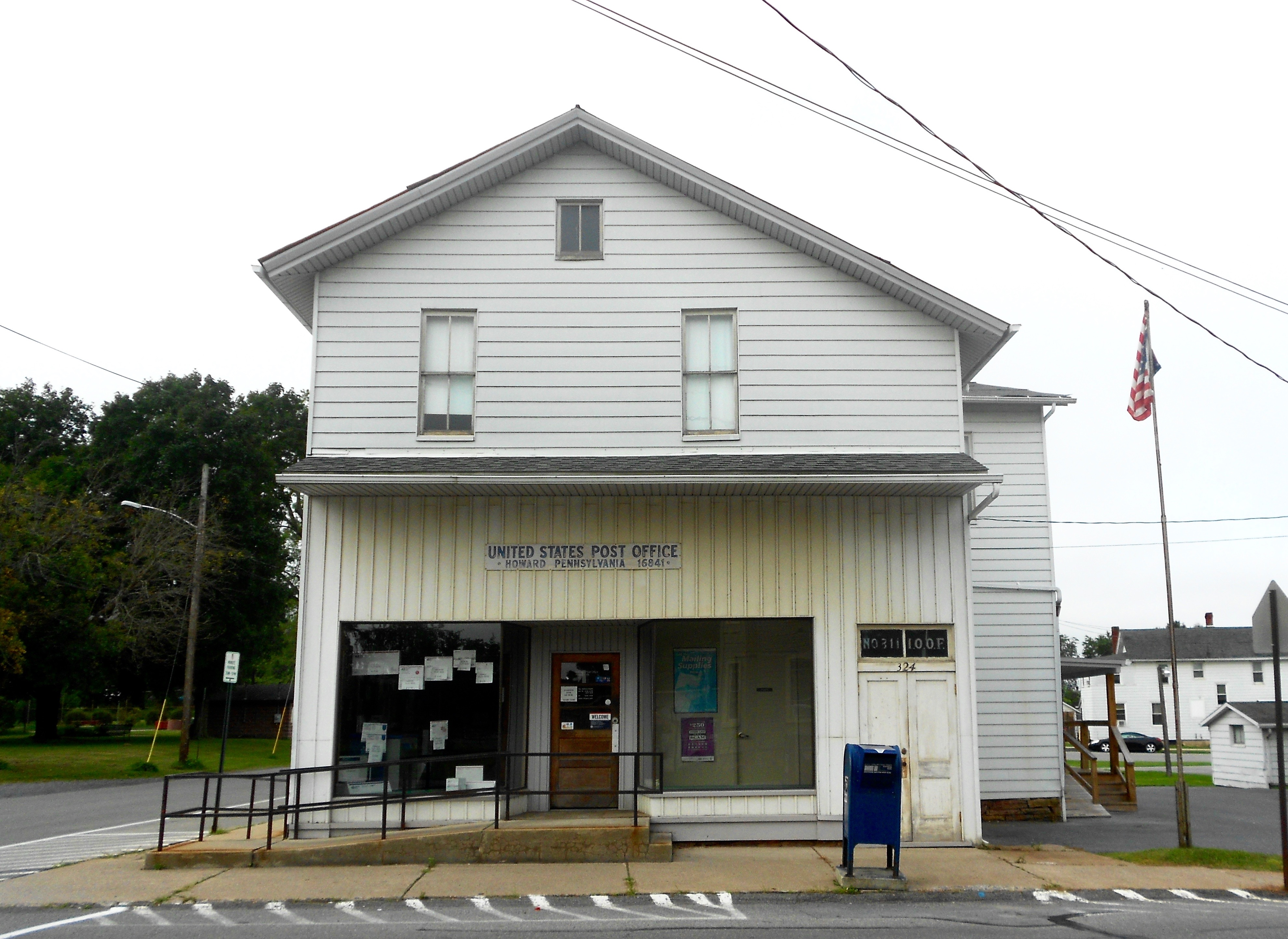
Post office

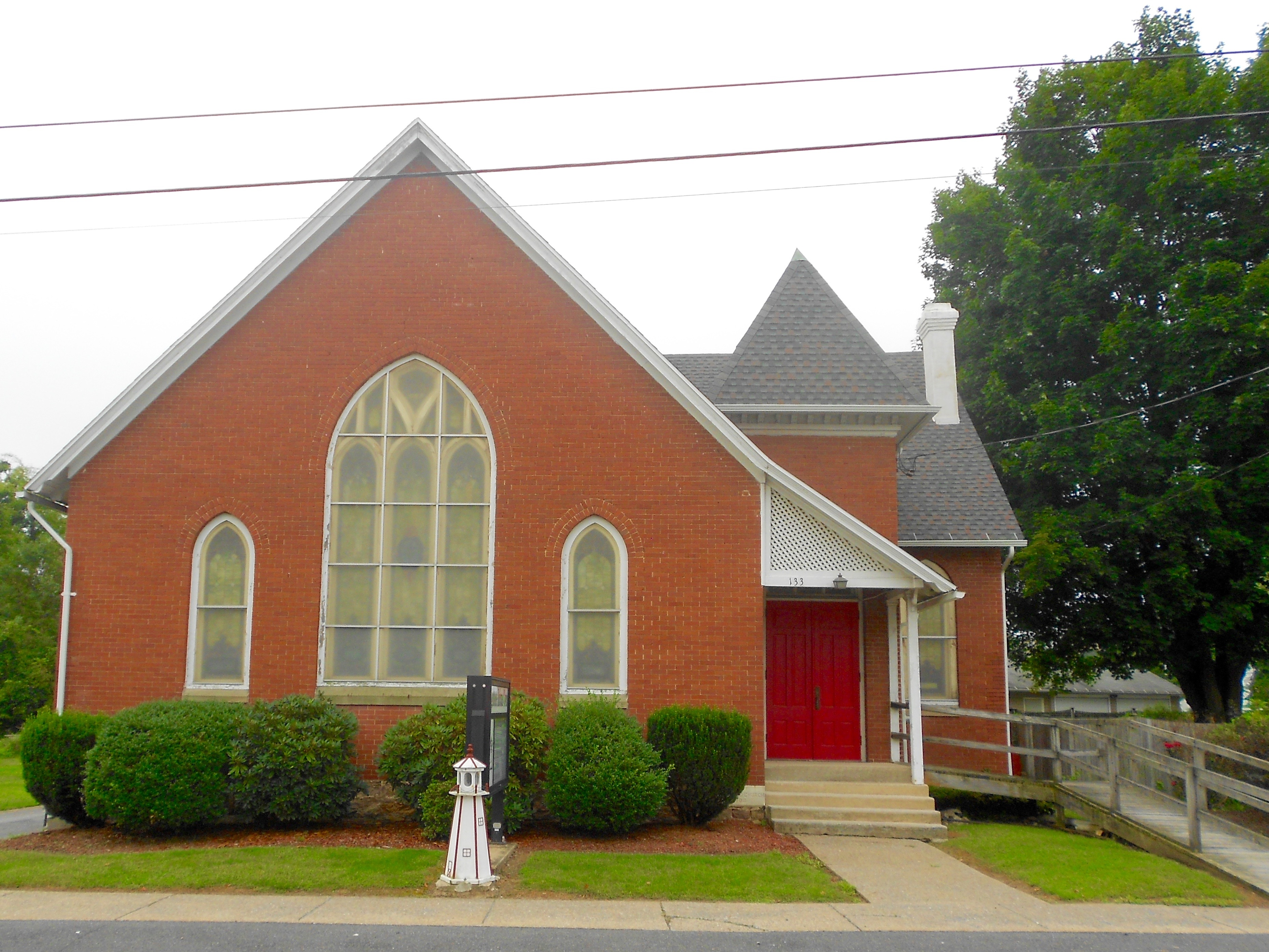
Lighthouse Reformed Church

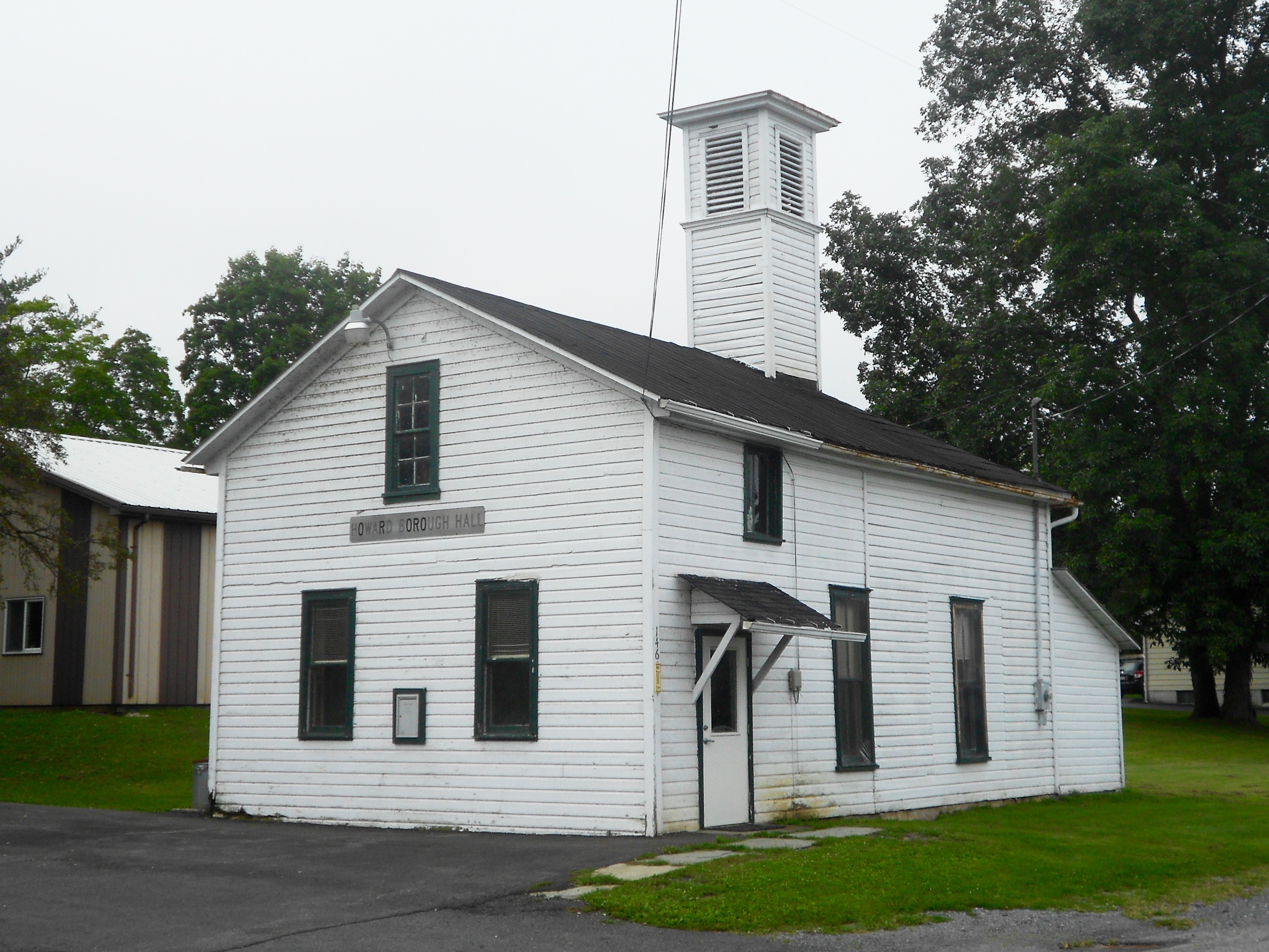
Howard Borough Hall across from the Borough Park

== Notable person ==
- Glenn Thompson – U.S. representative
