= Penns Valley Area High School =

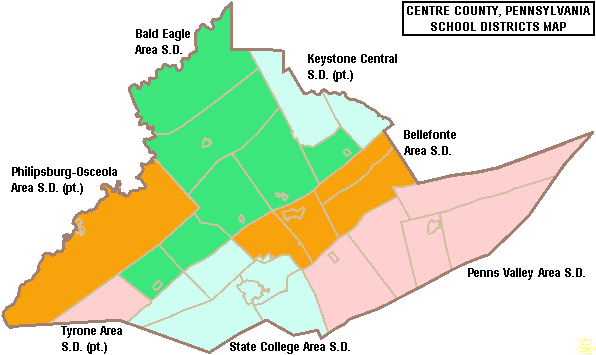

Location
- 4545 Penns Valley Road; Spring Mills, Centre County, Pennsylvania 16875-9403; United States; 40.8778°N 77.5303°W

Information
- Type: Public
- Principal: David Romanyshyn
- Teaching staff: 49.72 (FTE)
- Grades: 7-12
- Enrollment: 649 (2023-2024)
- Student to teacher ratio: 13.05
- Language: English
- Mascot: Ram
- Website: http://pennsvalley.org/

Penns Valley Area High School is a small, rural, public school located in Centre County, Pennsylvania. In 2015, enrollment was 672 pupils in 7th through 12th grades. The school employed 50 teachers in 2015. Penns Valley Area High School is the sole junior high school or senior high school operated by the Penns Valley Area School District.

Special education services are provided by district employees and the Central Intermediate Unit CIU10. Occupational training and adult education in various vocational and technical fields are provided by the district and the Central Pennsylvania Institute of Science and Technology.

== Extracurriculars ==
Penns Valley Area School District offers a wide variety of clubs and activities and an extensive sports program.

=== Sports ===
The district funds:

Varsity

Boys

- Baseball - AA
- Basketball - AA
- Cross Country - A
- Football and JV team - AA
- Golf - AA
- Soccer - A
- Track and Field - AA
- Wrestling - AA

Girls

- Basketball - AA
- Cross Country - A
- Golf - AA
- Soccer (Fall) - A
- Softball - AA
- Track and Field - AA
- Volleyball - A

Junior High Sports

Boys

- Basketball
- Football
- Soccer
- Track and Field
- Wrestling

Girls

- Basketball
- Soccer (fall)
- Softball
- Track and Field

According to PIAA directory July 2015
