= Rebersburg Historic District =

Historic district in Pennsylvania, United States

- U.S. National Register of Historic Places
- U.S. Historic district
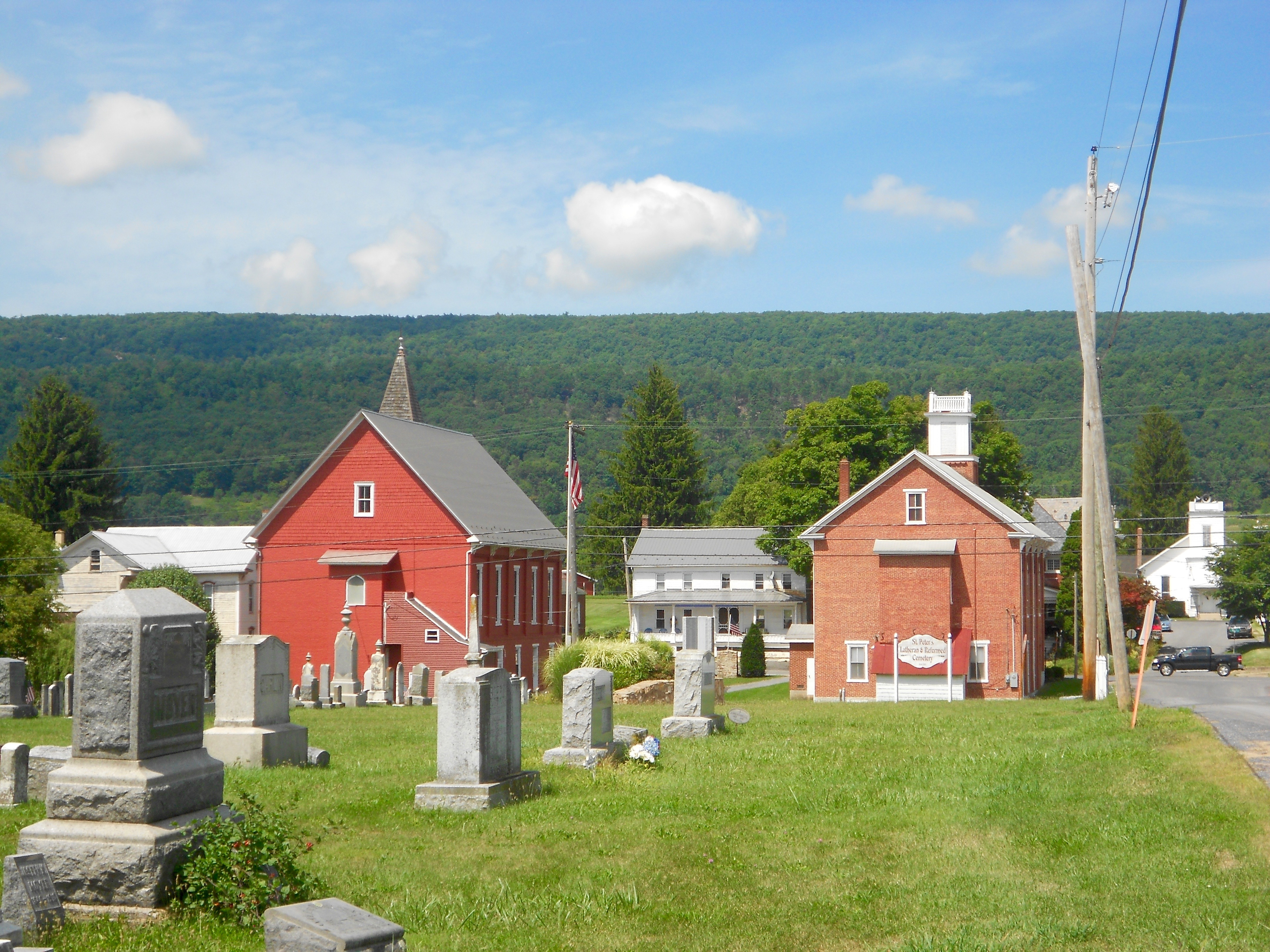
- St. Peters Cemetery with St. Peters UCC Church (right) and St Peters Lutheran Church in the background

- Location within Pennsylvania Location within the United States
- Location: PA 192, Miles Township, Pennsylvania
- Coordinates: 40°56′40″N 77°26′35″W
- Area: 160 acres (65 ha)
- Built: 1809
- Architectural style: Late Victorian, Gothic, Georgian
- NRHP reference No.: 79002188
- Added to NRHP: December 7, 1979

The Rebersburg Historic District is a national historic district that is located in Miles Township, Centre County, Pennsylvania.

It was added to the National Register of Historic Places in 1979.

== History and architectural features ==
This district includes 205 contributing buildings that are located in Rebersburg. The district is almost exclusively residential with three churches, a small luncheonette, an old schoolhouse, one grocery store, and a post office. Among the residential building types present are the row house, connected or double houses, a Continental four-over-four, a Pennsylvania four-over-four, and a Victorian Gothic.

Notable dwellings include the Jacob Major John Reynolds House (1820), the Robert Tate House (1810), the Daniel Walker House (1840), the Philip Reitzell Tavern (1821), the Colonel Henry Royer House (1823), the John Bierly Sr. House (1830), the Dr. John J. Hilbish House and Office (1853), the Daniel Brungart House (1875), the Emma J. Royer House (1897), and the James E. Ziegler House (1908).

== Gramley Schoolhouse Museum ==
The Gramley Schoolhouse was a wooden one-room school that was built in 1838. Formerly located 12 feet (3.7 m) from the present day Miles Township Elementary School this schoolhouse was used for younger grades and as an additional room for instruction at the newer elementary school. It was moved to its current site, a few yards away on Town Lane Road, in 2011 through an effort led by Vonnie Henninger; it then was converted into a museum that opened to the public on May 2, 2015.

The museum houses collections from the Gramley Schoolhouse, the former Miles Township High School, and exhibits about Rebersburg's historic residents. The museum also acts as a genealogical center for Miles Township.

== Gallery ==
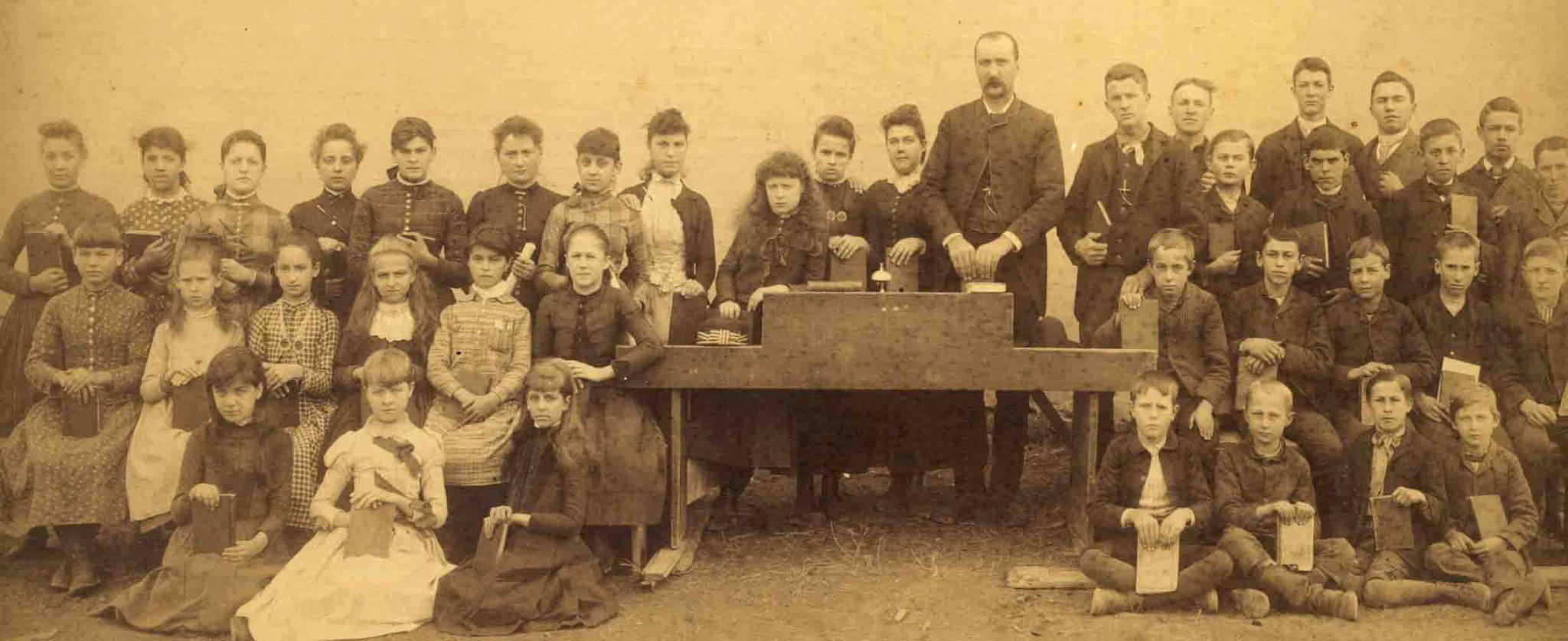
Students at Gramley Schoolhouse, c. 1889

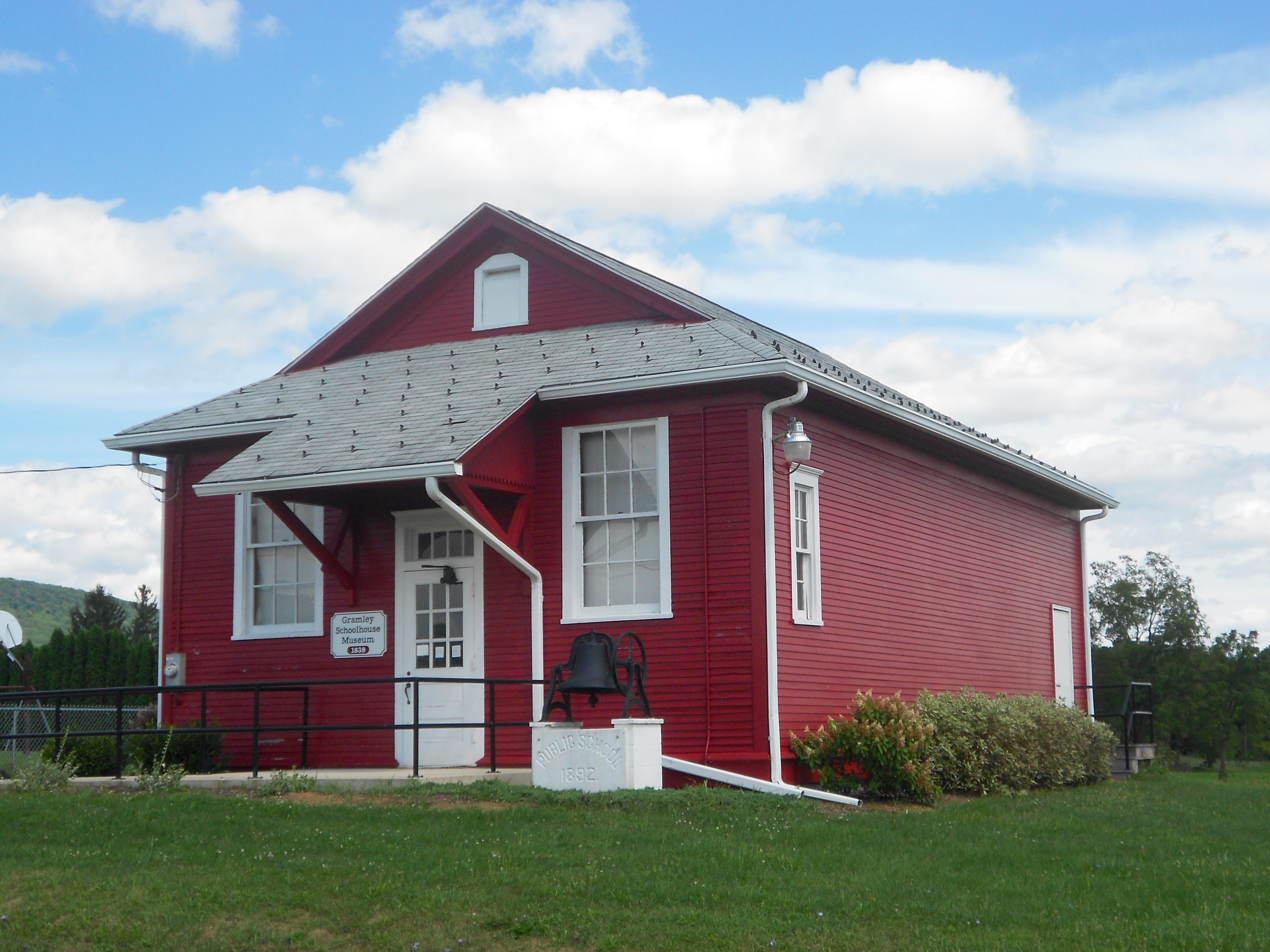
Schoolhouse Museum

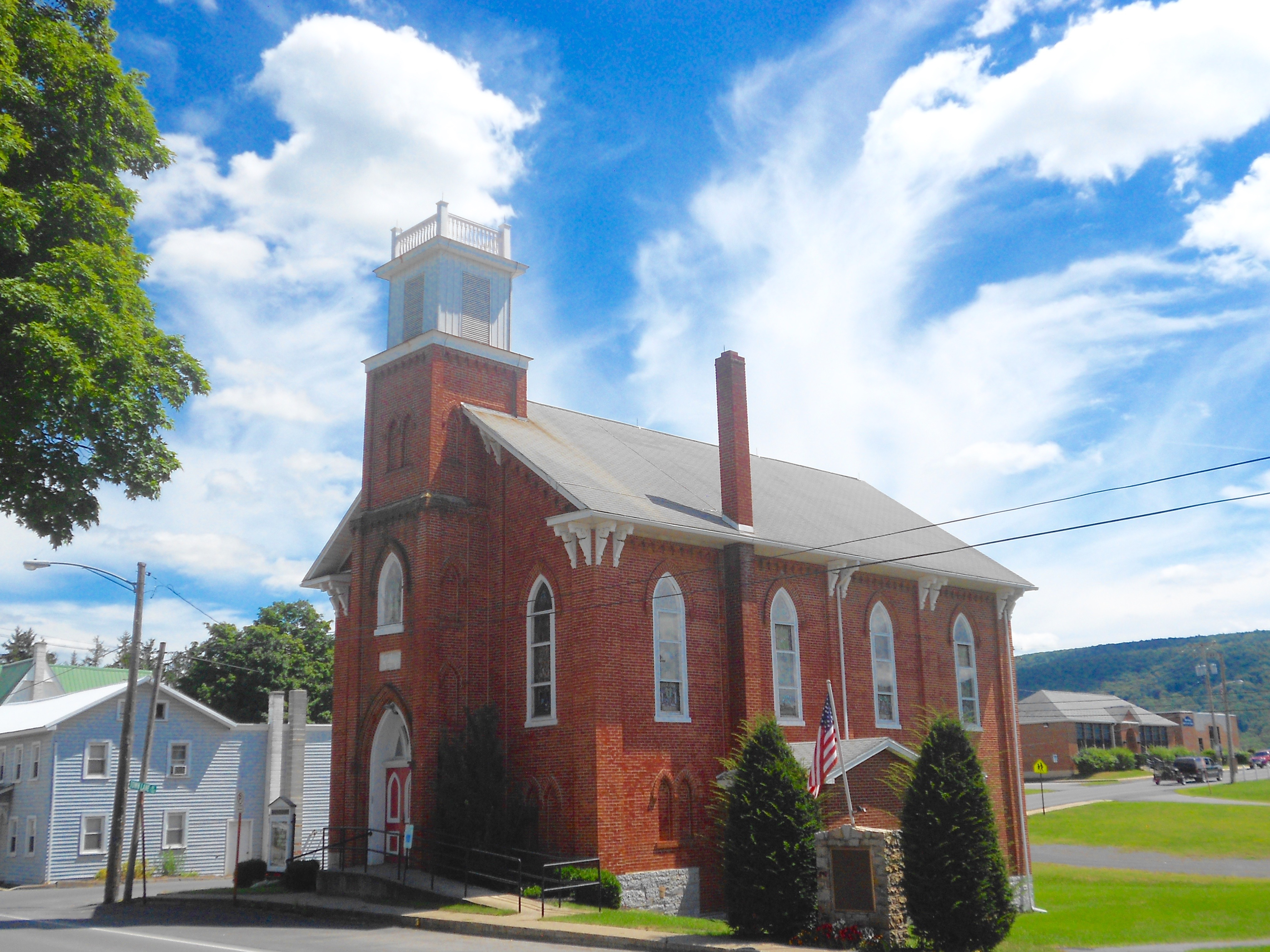
St Peters UCC Church

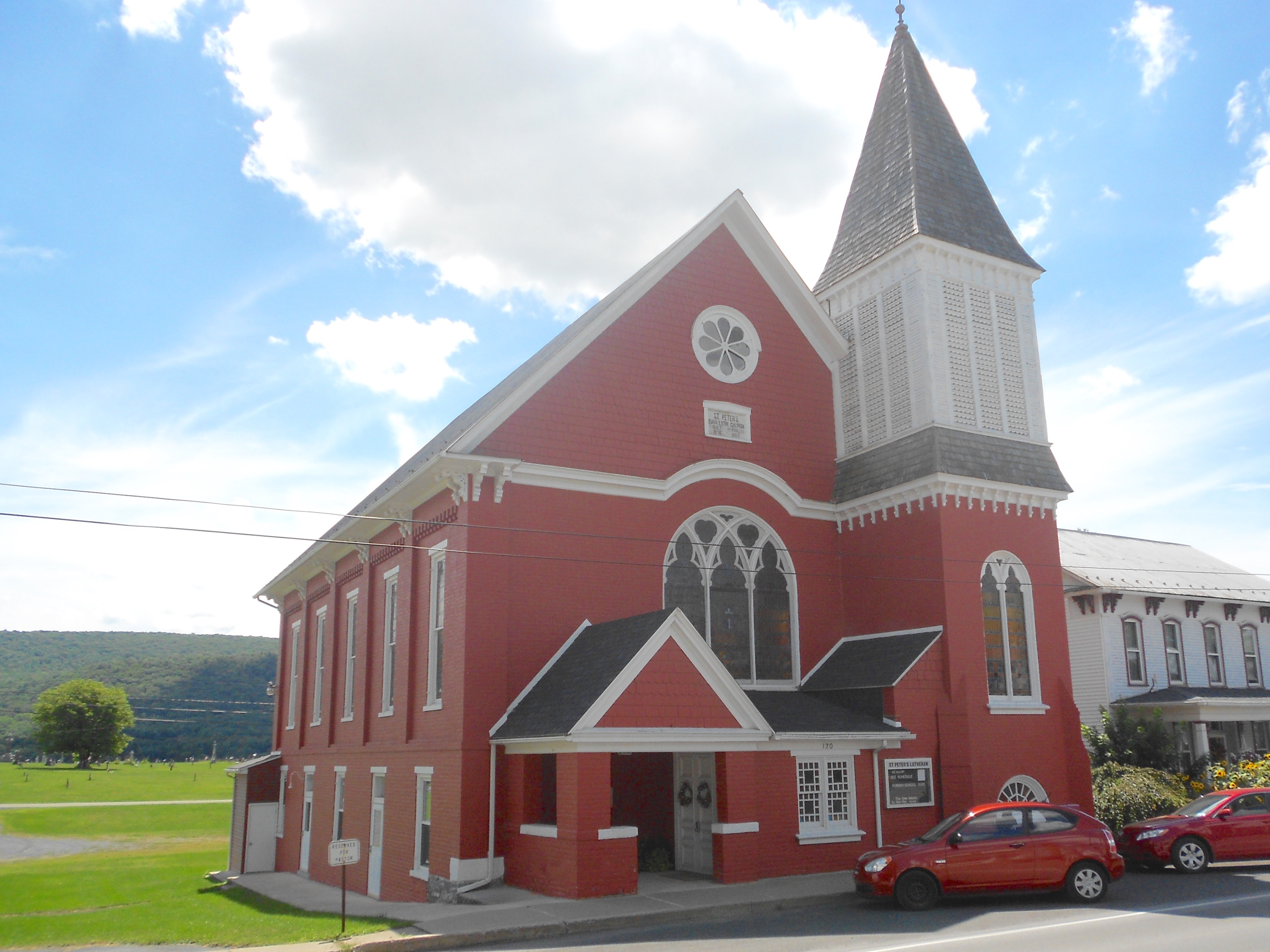
St. Peters Lutheran Church

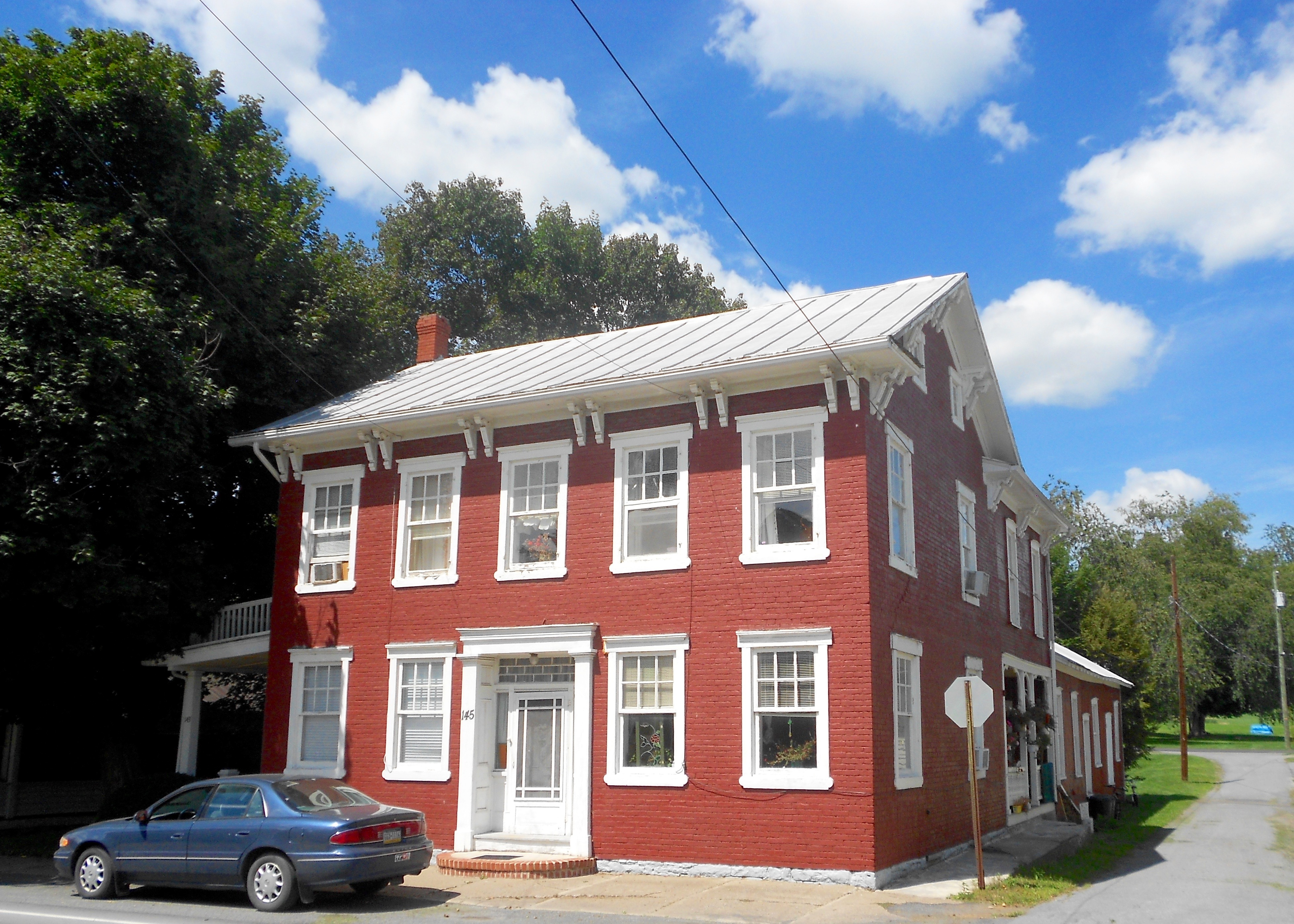
House in Rebersburg

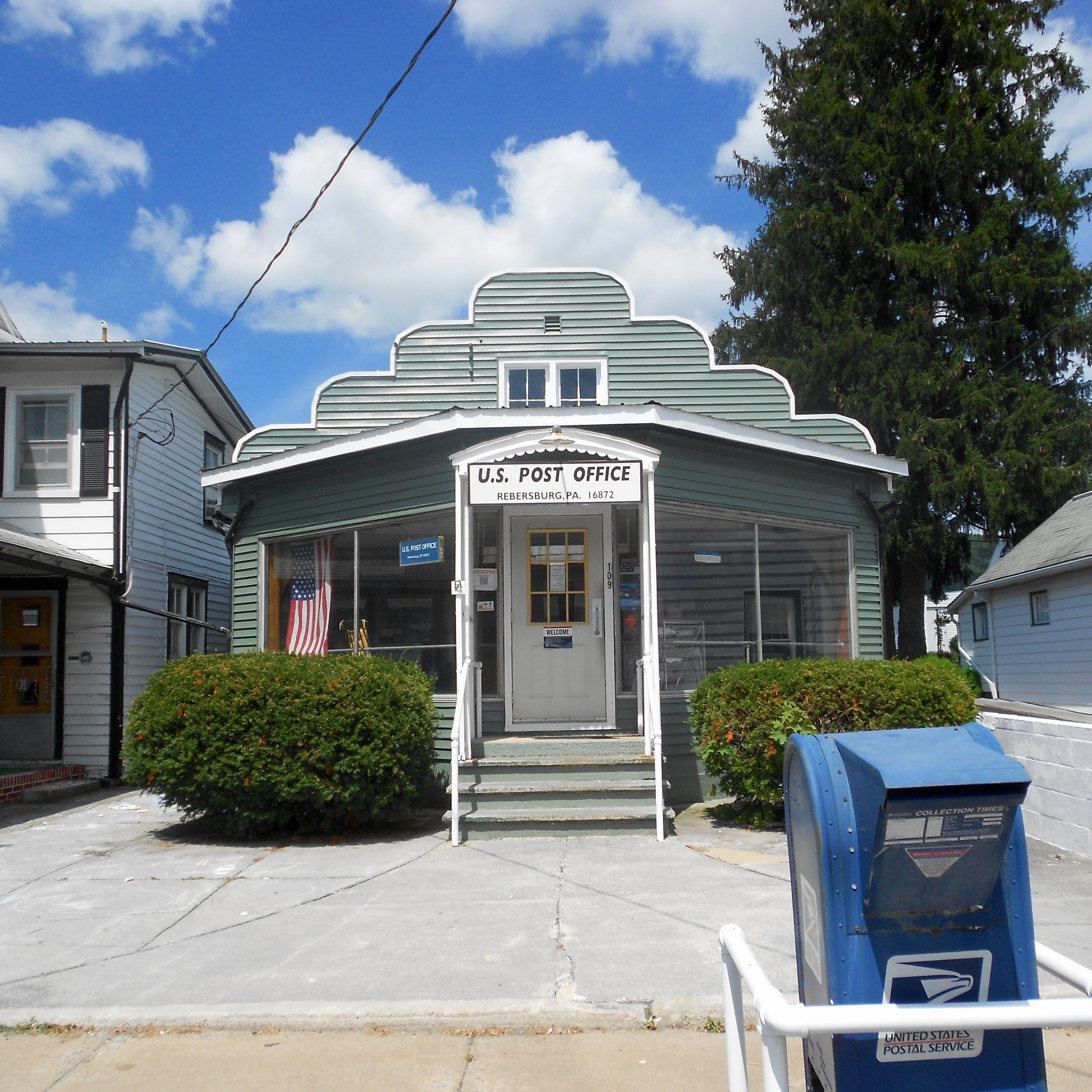
Post office
