= Poe Paddy State Park =

State park in Pennsylvania, United States

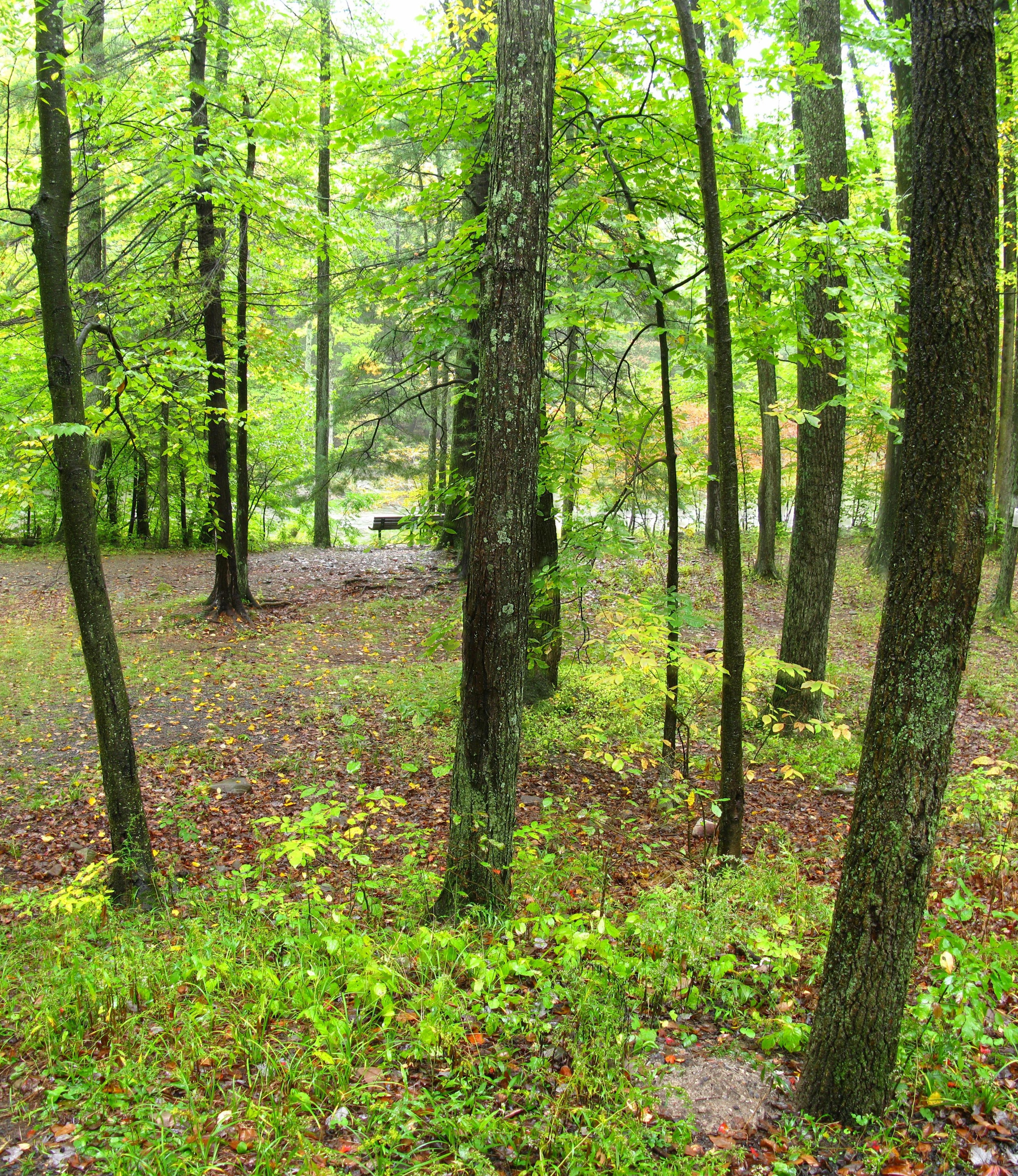

- Location within Pennsylvania Location within the United States
- Interactive map of Poe Paddy State Park
- Location: Haines Township, Centre County, Pennsylvania, United States
- Coordinates: 40°50′02″N 77°25′03″W
- Area: 22.73 acres (9.20 ha)
- Elevation: 974 feet (297 m)
- Established: 1935
- Administrator: Pennsylvania Department of Conservation and Natural Resources
- Website: Official website
- Pennsylvania State Parks

Poe Paddy State Park is a 23-acre (9.3 ha) Pennsylvania state park in Haines Township, Centre County, Pennsylvania in the United States. The park is surrounded by Bald Eagle State Forest. Poe Valley State Park is 4 miles (6.4 km) to the east. The park is at the confluence of Big Poe Creek and Penns Creek. Poe Paddy State Park is named for the two mountains that surround it. Poe Mountain lies to the east and Paddy Mountain lies to the west, with Penns Creek in the valley between them.

== History ==
Poe Paddy State Park is on the site of the former lumber town of Poe Mills. Poe Mills was part of the lumber boom that swept through the wooded mountains of Pennsylvania from the mid-to-late 19th and early 20th centuries. At its peak, Poe Mills had a population of over 300. Big Poe Creek was dammed to provide power for the mills and a railroad was built into the area to transport lumber. This railway became a scenic route connecting the area with Milroy.

Poe Valley State Park and Poe Paddy State Park were built by the Civilian Conservation Corps during the Great Depression of the 1930s. The young men of the CCC also worked to clear the regrowing forests of brush to prevent forest fires. They constructed roads throughout the forests, built state park facilities, constructed bridges on the state roads, planted trees for reforestation, and cleaned streams.

== Recreation ==
Penns Creek flows by the campground and is a trout fishery. Fly fishing is the most popular form of fishing at Poe Paddy State. It is noted for the Green Drake hatch that occurs in late spring. These flies are nearly the size of a small hummingbird and become the primary food source for the trout living in Penns Creek.

The rustic campground opens with trout season on the 2nd Friday in April and closes at the end of doe season in mid December. There are no showers or flush toilets at the campground. A sanitary dump station is provided at Poe Valley State Park. There are six tables and two pavilions available for visitors. The Pennsylvania Mid State Trail, a hiking trail 306 miles (492 km) long, passes through Poe Valley. During the winter the gravel roads are open to cross-country skiing and recreational snowmobile use.
