= Woodward, Pennsylvania =

Unincorporated community in Pennsylvania, US

- Census-designated place
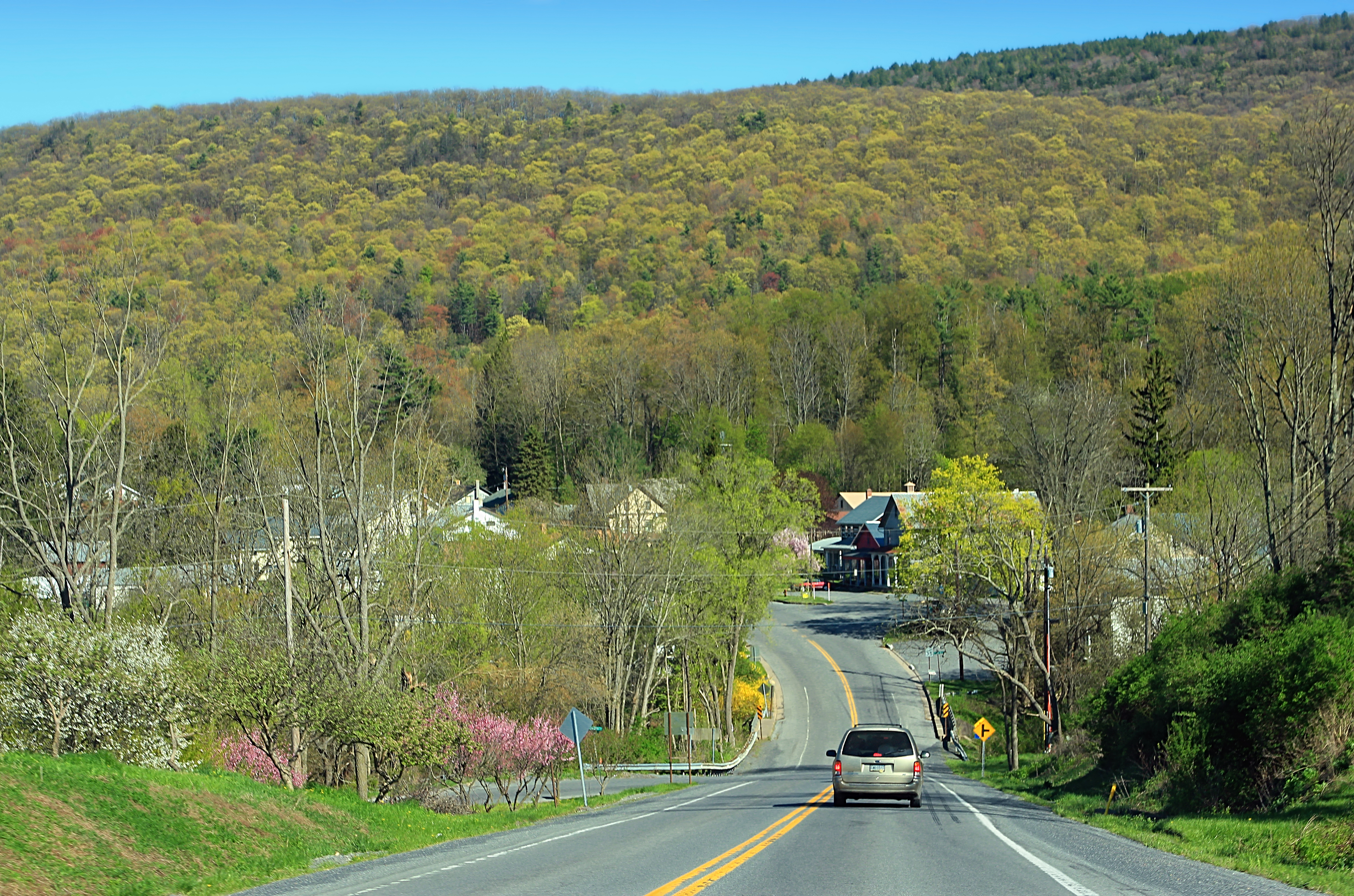
- Pennsylvania Route 45 heading into Woodward

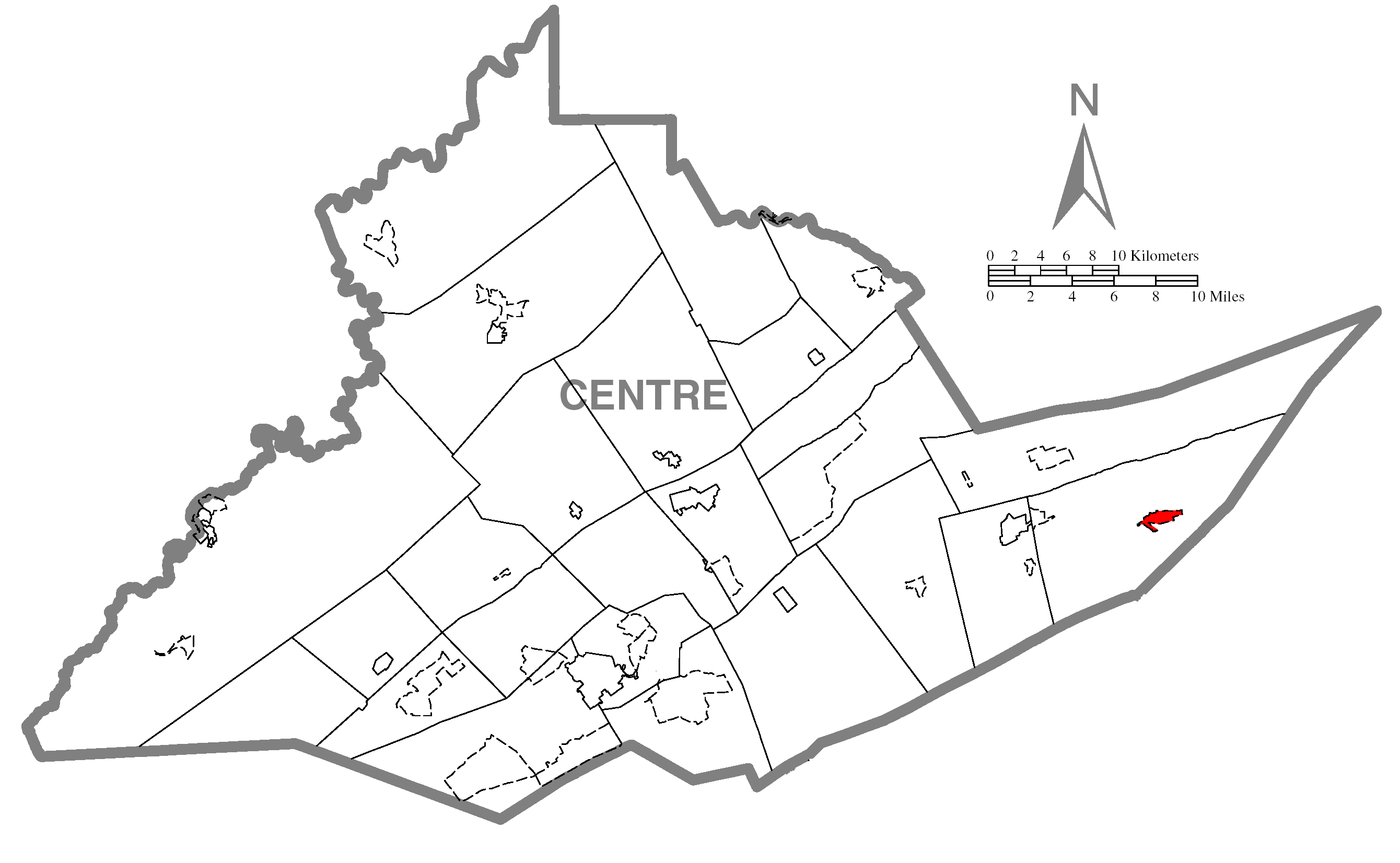
- Location within Centre County

- Location within the U.S. state of Pennsylvania Woodward (the United States)
- Coordinates: 40°53′56″N 77°21′16″W
- Country: United States
- State: Pennsylvania
- County: Centre
- Township: Haines

Area
  - Total: 0.59 sq mi (1.53 km^{2})
  - Land: 0.59 sq mi (1.53 km^{2})
- Elevation: 1,127 ft (344 m)

Population (2010)
  - Total: 110
  - Density: 186/sq mi (71.9/km^{2})
- Time zone: UTC-5 (Eastern (EST))
  - Summer (DST): UTC-4 (EDT)
- ZIP code: 16882
- FIPS code: 42-86432
- GNIS feature ID: 1191777

Woodward is an unincorporated community and census-designated place in Haines Township, Centre County, Pennsylvania, United States. It is part of the State College, Pennsylvania, Metropolitan Statistical Area. The population was 110 at the 2010 census.

== Geography ==
Woodward is located in eastern Centre County at 40°53′56″N 77°21′16″W (40.898773, -77.354439), east of the center of Haines Township. It is at the eastern end of Penns Valley at the northern base of Woodward Mountain and Sand Mountain. Pennsylvania Route 45 passes through the town, leading east 17 miles (27 km) to Mifflinburg and west 6 miles (10 km) to Millheim.

According to the United States Census Bureau, the Woodward CDP has a total area of 0.59 square miles (1.53 km^{2}), all land.

== Demographics ==
At the 2000 census there were 126 people, 61 households, and 38 families living in the CDP. The population density was 140.4 inhabitants per square mile (54.2/km^{2}). There were 69 housing units at an average density of 76.9 per square mile (29.7/km^{2}). The racial makeup of the CDP was 99.21% White, 0.79% from other races. Hispanic or Latino of any race were 3.97%.

There were 61 households, 24.6% had children under the age of 18 living with them, 52.5% were married couples living together, 4.9% had a female householder with no husband present, and 37.7% were non-families. 32.8% of households were made up of individuals, and 21.3% were one person aged 65 or older. The average household size was 2.07 and the average family size was 2.58.

The age distribution was 17.5% under the age of 18, 5.6% from 18 to 24, 27.8% from 25 to 44, 26.2% from 45 to 64, and 23.0% 65 or older. The median age was 44 years. For every 100 females, there were 96.9 males. For every 100 females age 18 and over, there were 92.6 males.

The median household income was $26,250 and the median family income was $37,083. Males had a median income of $28,333 versus $24,375 for females. The per capita income for the CDP was $15,089. There were 9.8% of families and 15.8% of the population living below the poverty line, including 16.0% of under eighteens and 9.7% of those over 64.
