= Miles Township, Pennsylvania =

Township in Pennsylvania, US

Coordinates: 40°56′00″N 77°30′59″W

- Township
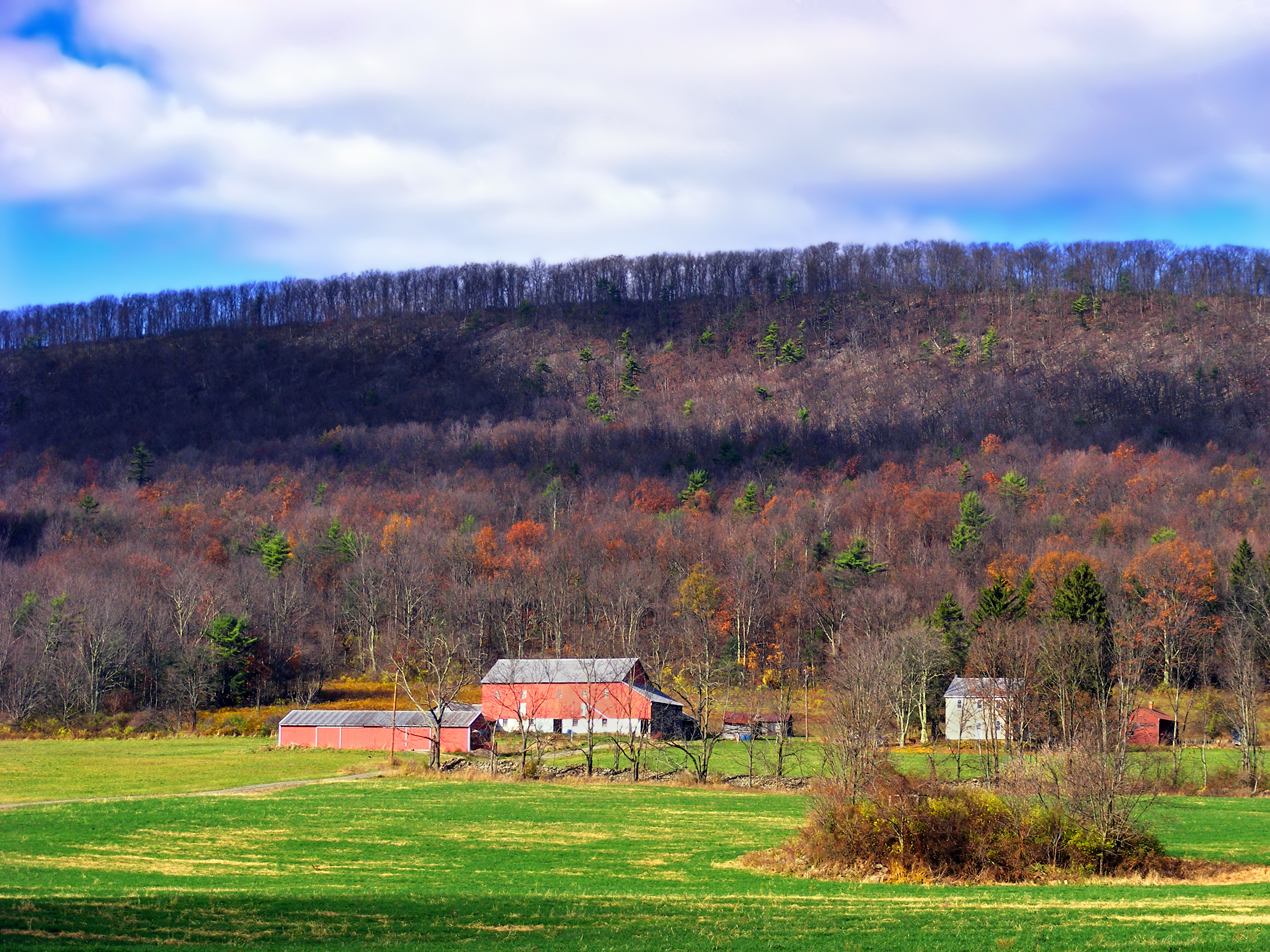
- A farm in Miles Township

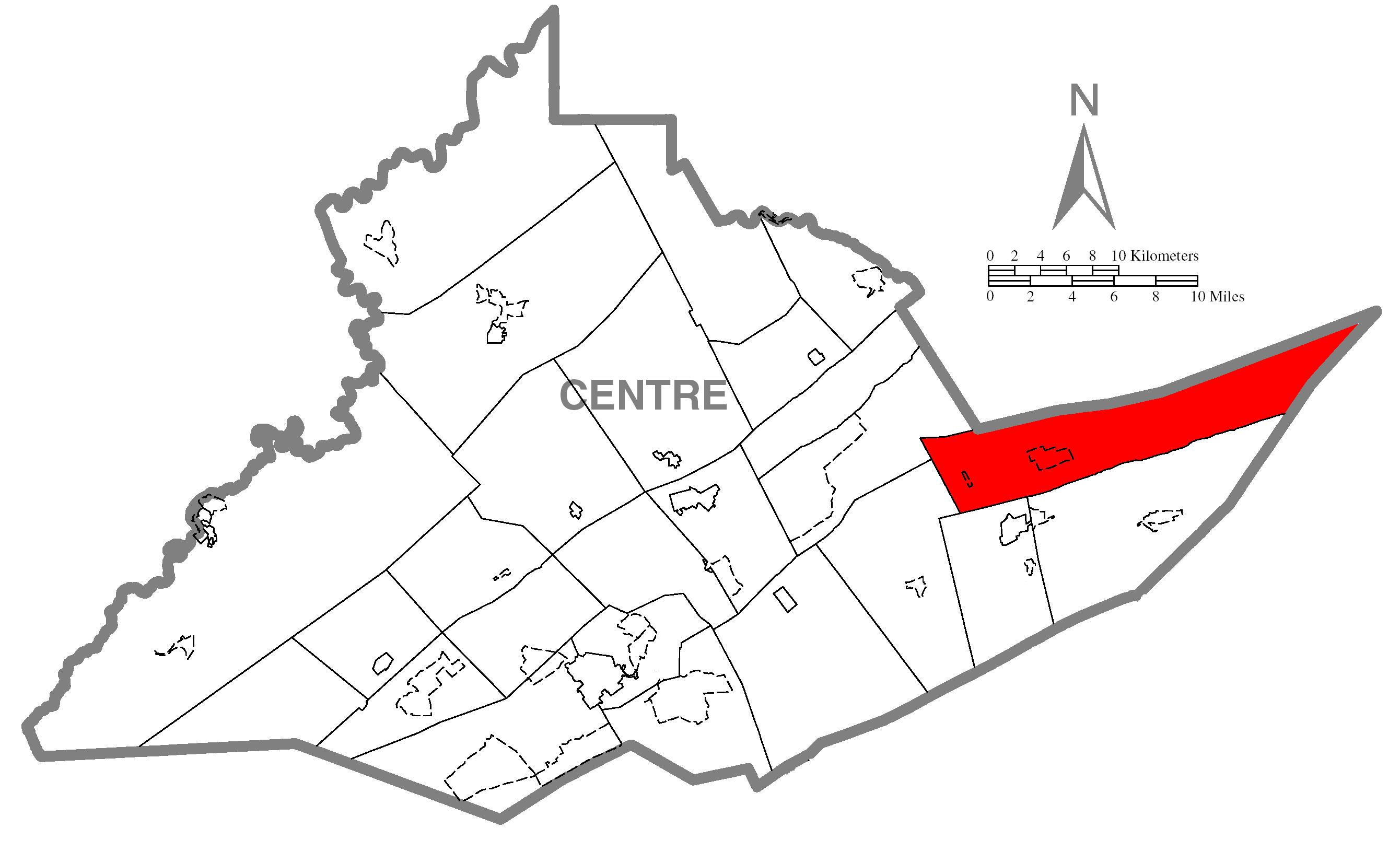
- Map of Centre County, Pennsylvania highlighting Miles Township

- Map of Centre County, Pennsylvania
- Country: United States
- State: Pennsylvania
- County: Centre
- Settled: 1791
- Incorporated: 1797

Area
  - Total: 62.58 sq mi (162.08 km^{2})
  - Land: 62.58 sq mi (162.08 km^{2})
  - Water: 0 sq mi (0.00 km^{2})

Population (2020)
  - Total: 2,013 ▲
  - Estimate (2021): 2,008
  - Density: 31.8/sq mi (12.27/km^{2})
- Time zone: UTC-5 (EST)
  - Summer (DST): UTC-4 (EDT)
- FIPS code: 42-027-49360

Historical population
Census	Pop.	Note	%±
2000	1,573		—
2010	1,983		26.1%
2020	2,013		1.5%
2021 (est.)	2,008		−0.2%
U.S. Decennial Census

Miles Township is a township in Centre County, Pennsylvania, United States. It is part of the State College, Pennsylvania Metropolitan Statistical Area. The population was 2,013 at the 2020 census, an increase over the figure of 1,983 tabulated in 2010. Miles Township and nearby Milesburg were named after Samuel Miles, who co-owned the Centre Furnace, along with Colonel John Patton.

== History ==
Centre Mills, Simon Pickle Stone House, and the Rebersburg Historic District are listed on the National Register of Historic Places.

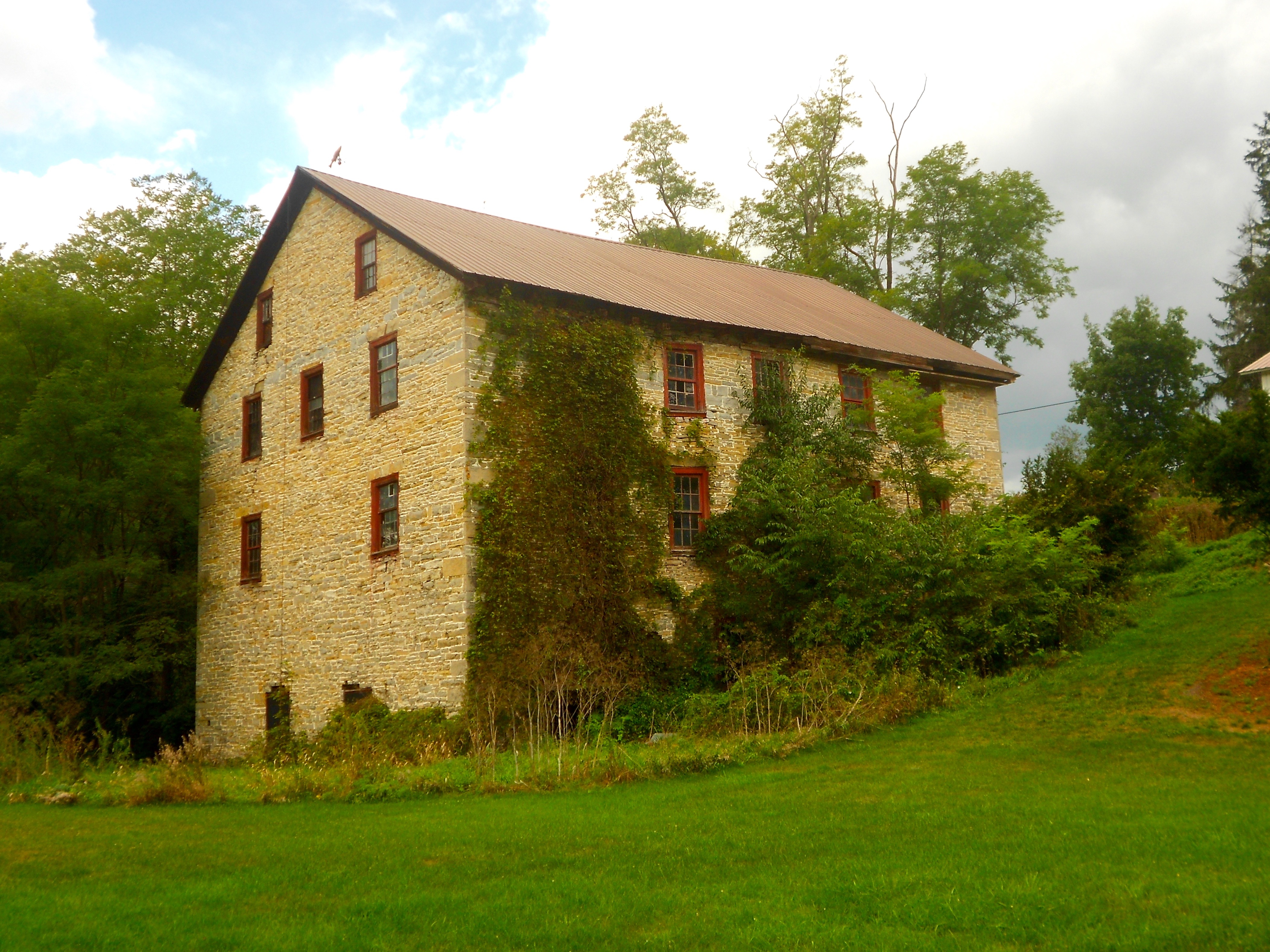
Centre Mills

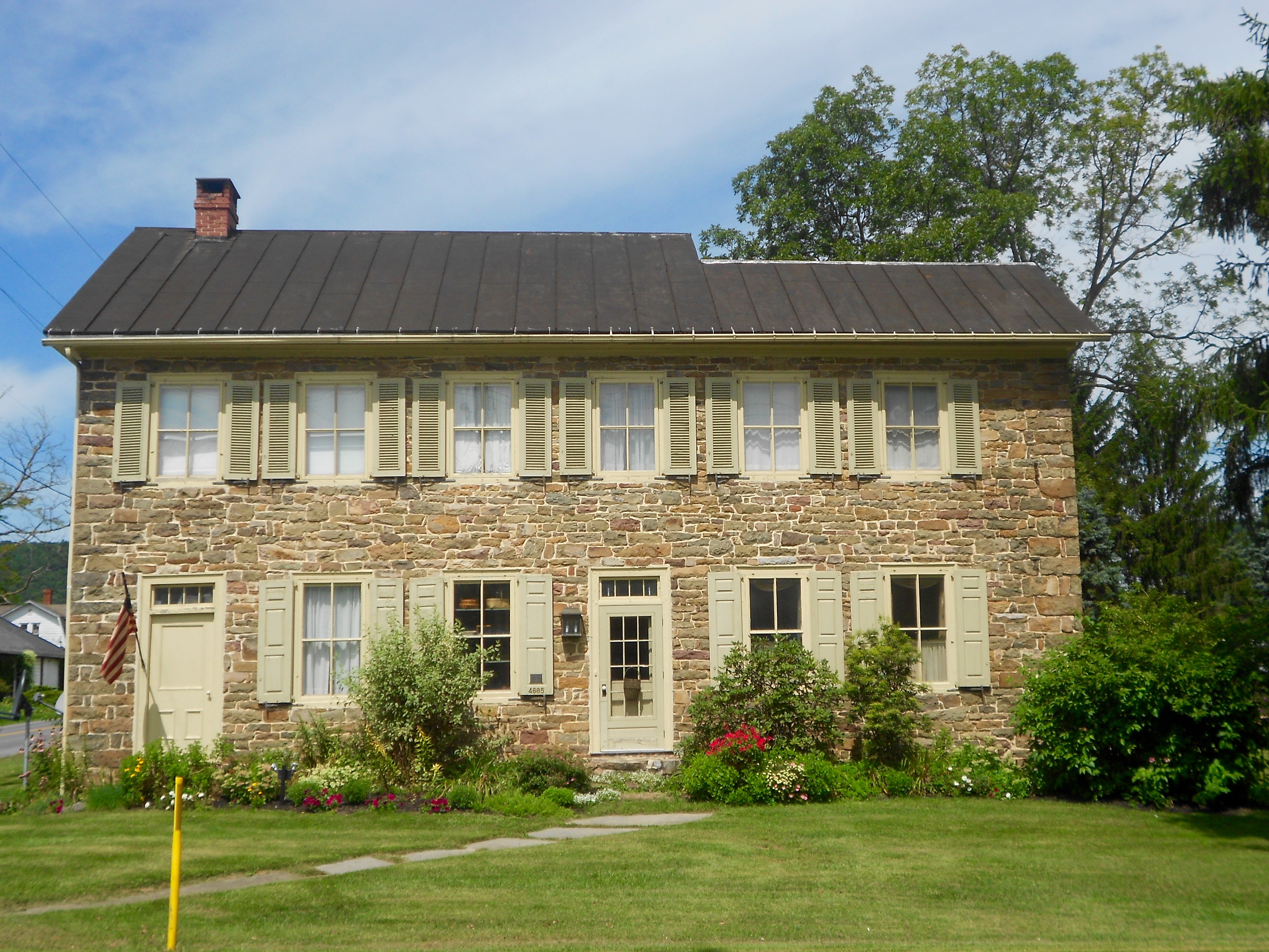
Simon Pickle Stone House

== Geography ==
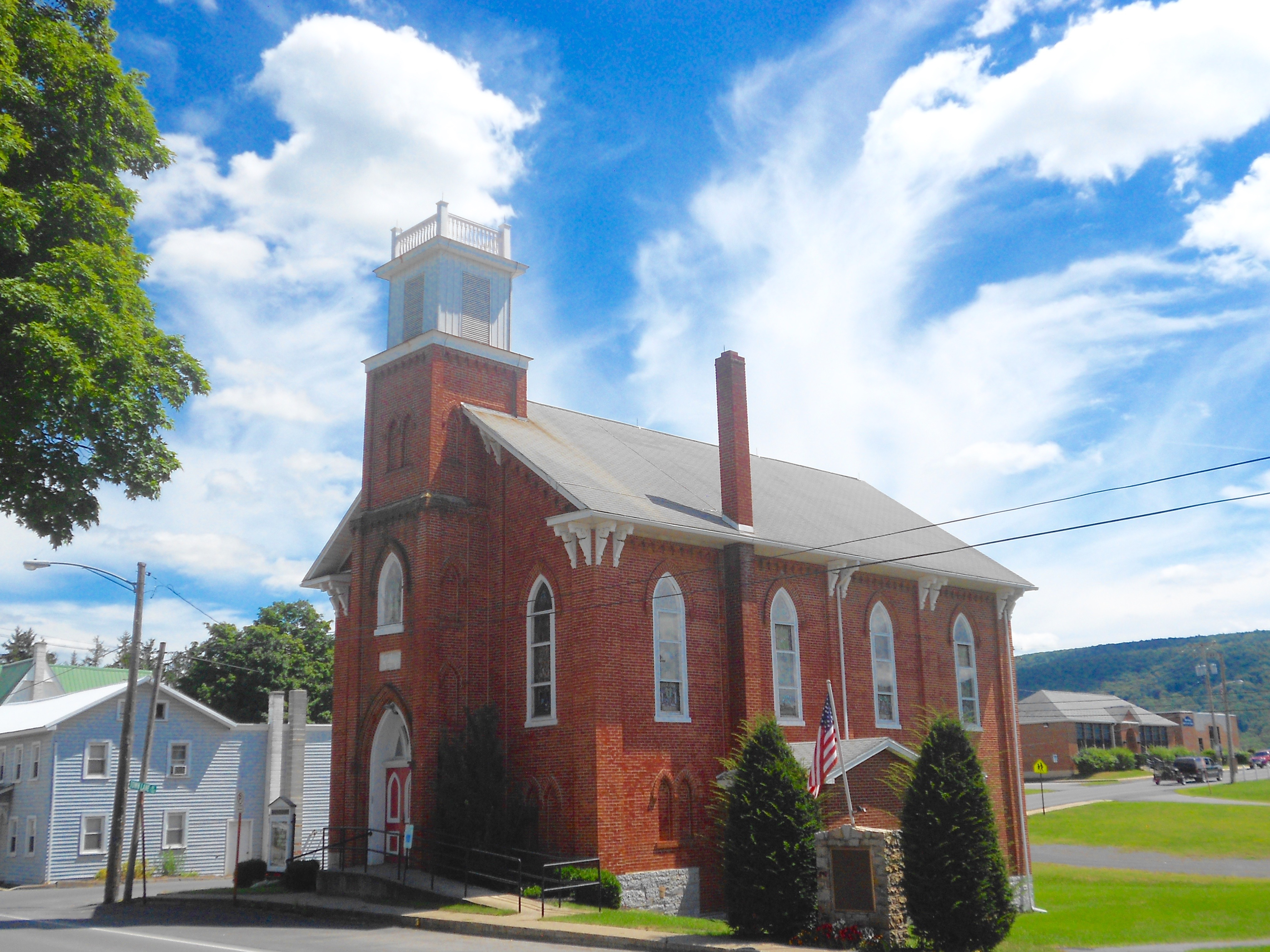
St. Peter's Reformed Church in the Rebersburg Historic District

According to the United States Census Bureau, the township has a total area of 62.5 square miles (162.0 km^{2}), all land. It contains the census-designated place of Madisonburg.

Miles Township is bordered by Clinton County to the north, Union County to the east, Haines and Penn townships to the south, Gregg Township to the west, and Walker Township to the northwest. It is part of the Penns Valley region of Centre County, bordered by the long ridges of Shriner Mountain to the south and Nittany Mountain to the north.

The township contains the census-designated place of Redersburg.

== Parks and recreation ==
Miles Township is home to McCalls Dam State Park. The park is in a remote location on a dirt road between R. B. Winter State Park on Pennsylvania Route 192 and Eastville on Pennsylvania Route 880. In the winter months the park can only be accessed by snowmobiling or cross-country skiing.

McCalls Dam State Park has a small camping area and a small picnic area with a few tables and charcoal grills. There are no modern restroom facilities at the park, and visitors are asked to carry out all trash as there is no trash pick up at the park.

The park is named for the splash dam that Johnny McCall built on White Deer Creek in 1850. He used the waters that flowed from the dam to power a sawmill. Sixteen years later the dam was rebuilt to provide water for a series of splash dams that were used to float white pine logs to the sawmills on the West Branch Susquehanna River at Watsontown. The park's facilities were originally constructed by the Civilian Conservation Corps in the 1933. The mill and dam are long since gone, but they are remembered along with Johnny McCall in the name of McCalls Dam State Park.

== Demographics ==
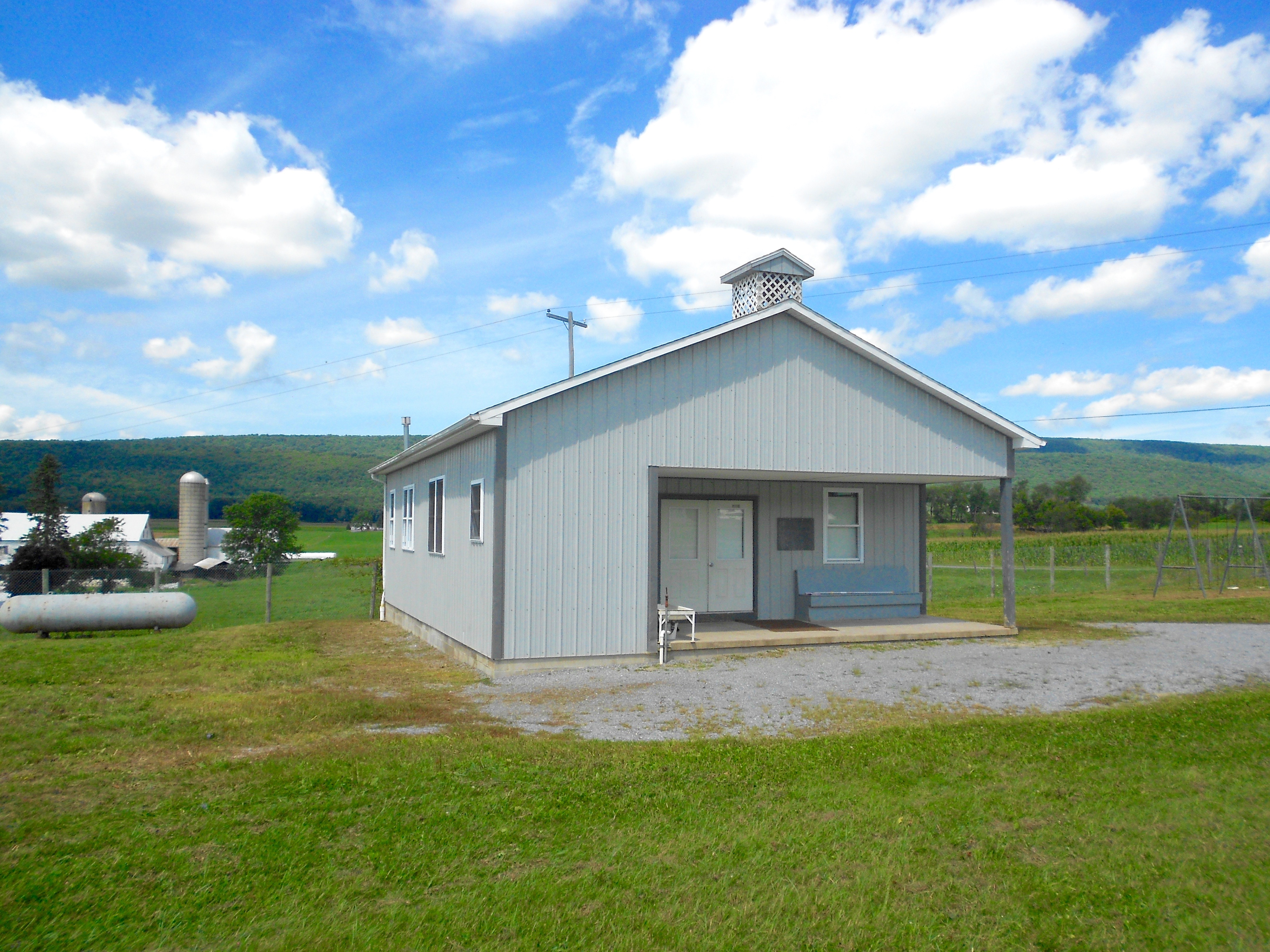
Amish school near Rebersburg

As of the census of 2000, there were 1,573 people, 526 households, and 419 families residing in the township. The population density was 25.1 people per square mile (9.7 people/km^{2}). There were 693 housing units at an average density of 11.0 per square mile (4.2/km^{2}). The racial makeup of the township was 98.66% White, 0.70% African American, 0.19% Native American, 0.13% Asian, and 0.32% from two or more races. Hispanic or Latino of any race were 0.13% of the population.

There were 526 households, out of which 36.7% had children under the age of 18 living with them, 71.3% were married couples living together, 6.3% had a female householder with no husband present, and 20.2% were non-families. 17.7% of all households were made up of individuals, and 9.1% had someone living alone who was 65 years of age or older. The average household size was 2.96 and the average family size was 3.40.

In the township the population was spread out, with 32.5% under the age of 18, 8.2% from 18 to 24, 24.7% from 25 to 44, 21.7% from 45 to 64, and 12.9% who were 65 years of age or older. The median age was 33 years. For every 100 females, there were 94.2 males. For every 100 females age 18 and over, there were 97.8 males.

The median income for a household in the township was $33,074, and the median income for a family was $36,063. Males had a median income of $24,205 versus $23,500 for females. The per capita income for the township was $13,180. About 9.4% of families and 15.0% of the population were below the poverty line, including 24.5% of those under age 18 and 7.9% of those age 65 or over.

== Education ==
Miles Township is in the Penns Valley Area School District.

== Notable person ==
- Daniel Otto, fraktur artist
