= Penn Township, Centre County, Pennsylvania =

Township in Pennsylvania, US

Coordinates: 40°53′00″N 77°30′59″W

- Township
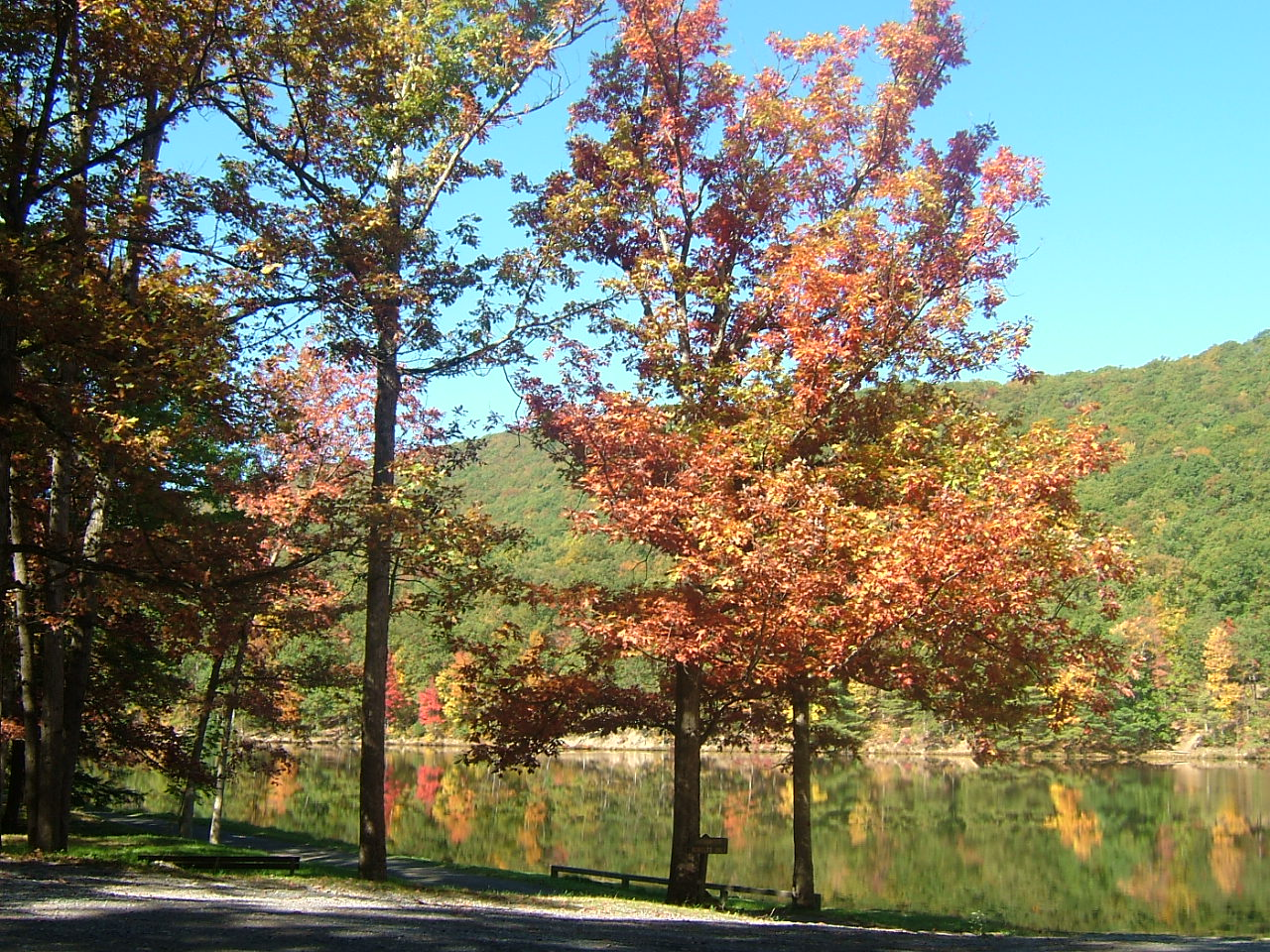
- Poe Valley State Park in Penn Township

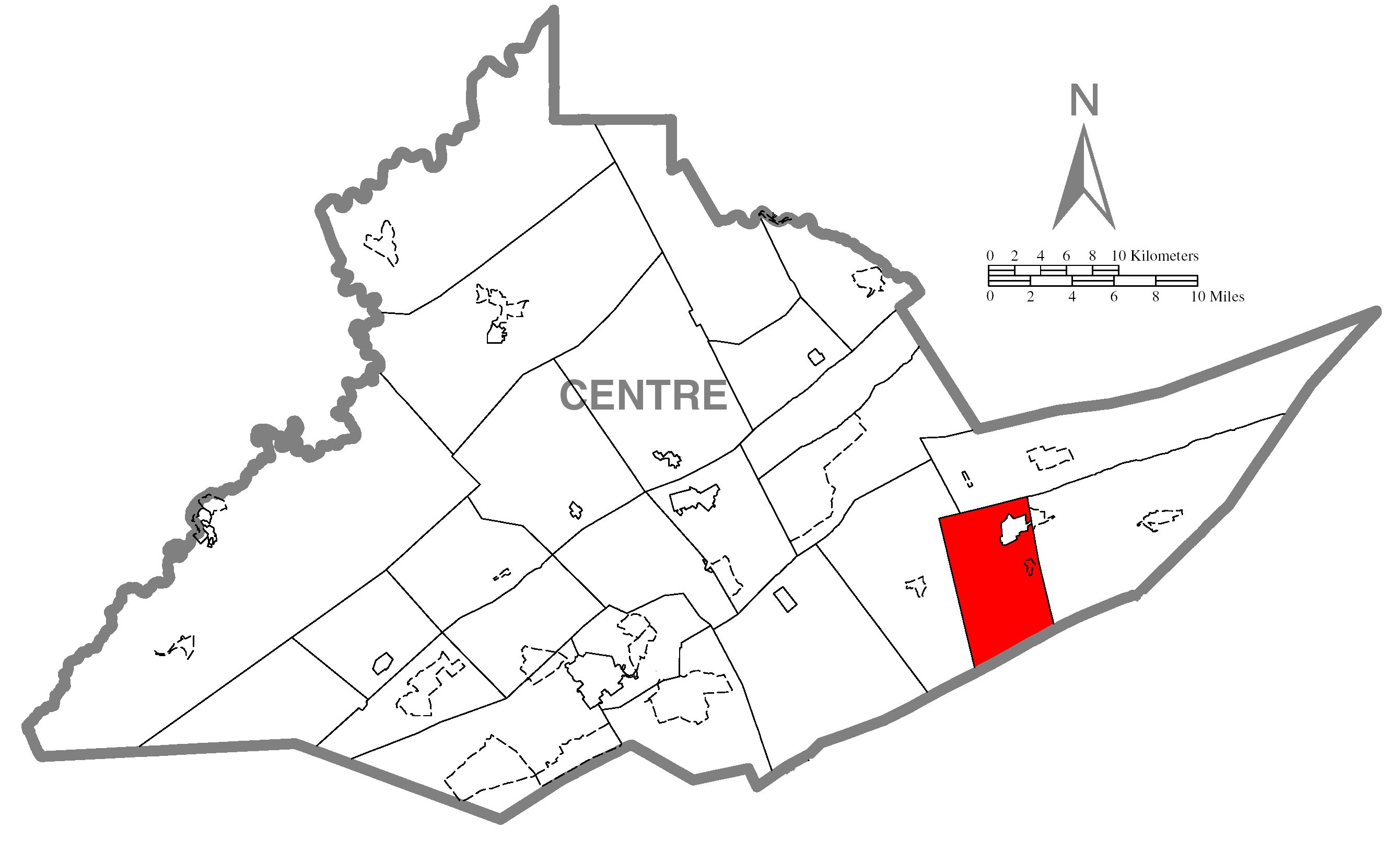
- Map of Centre County, Pennsylvania highlighting Penn Township

- Map of Centre County, Pennsylvania
- Country: United States
- State: Pennsylvania
- County: Centre

Area
  - Total: 28.38 sq mi (73.50 km^{2})
  - Land: 28.32 sq mi (73.34 km^{2})
  - Water: 0.058 sq mi (0.15 km^{2})

Population (2020)
  - Total: 1,214 ▲
  - Estimate (2021): 1,212
  - Density: 41.9/sq mi (16.16/km^{2})
- Time zone: UTC-5 (EST)
  - Summer (DST): UTC-4 (EDT)
- FIPS code: 42-027-58800
- Website: https://penntwpcentre.com/

Penn Township is a township in Centre County, Pennsylvania, United States. It is part of the State College, Pennsylvania Metropolitan Statistical Area. The population was 1,214 at the 2020 census. Poe Valley State Park is in Penn Township.

== Geography ==
According to the United States Census Bureau, the township has a total area of 28.4 square miles (73.5 km^{2}), of which 0.019 square miles (0.05 km^{2}), or 0.07%, is water.

Penn Township is bordered by Miles Township to the north, Haines Township to the east, Mifflin County to the south and Gregg Township to the west and north. The township also surrounds the separate borough of Millheim and is part of the Penns Valley region of Centre County.

The township contains the census-designated place of Coburn.

== Demographics ==
Historical population
Census	Pop.	Note	%±
2000	1,044		—
2010	1,181		13.1%
2020	1,214		2.8%
2021 (est.)	1,212		−0.2%
U.S. Decennial Census

As of the census of 2000, there were 1,044 people, 359 households, and 287 families residing in the township. The population density was 37.1 inhabitants per square mile (14.3/km^{2}). There were 533 housing units at an average density of 18.9 units per square mile (7.3 units/km^{2}). The racial makeup of the township was 98.18% White, 0.57% African American, 0.77% Asian, 0.10% Pacific Islander, 0.10% from other races, and 0.29% from two or more races. Hispanic or Latino of any race were 0.57% of the population.

There were 359 households, out of which 35.9% had children under the age of 18 living with them, 66.0% were married couples living together, 9.2% had a female householder with no husband present, and 19.8% were non-families. 16.4% of all households were made up of individuals, and 7.8% had someone living alone who was 65 years of age or older. The average household size was 2.77 and the average family size was 3.09.

In the township the population was spread out, with 26.5% under the age of 18, 8.0% from 18 to 24, 29.0% from 25 to 44, 22.7% from 45 to 64, and 13.8% who were 65 years of age or older. The median age was 36 years. For every 100 females, there were 103.5 males. For every 100 females age 18 and over, there were 102.4 males.

The median income for a household in the township was $41,544, and the median income for a family was $44,688. Males had a median income of $29,605 versus $22,404 for females. The per capita income for the township was $15,530. About 7.6% of families and 11.1% of the population were below the poverty line, including 15.5% of those under age 18 and 1.6% of those age 65 or over.

== Education ==
Penn Township is in the Penns Valley Area School District.
