= Poe Valley State Park =

Pennsylvania State Park

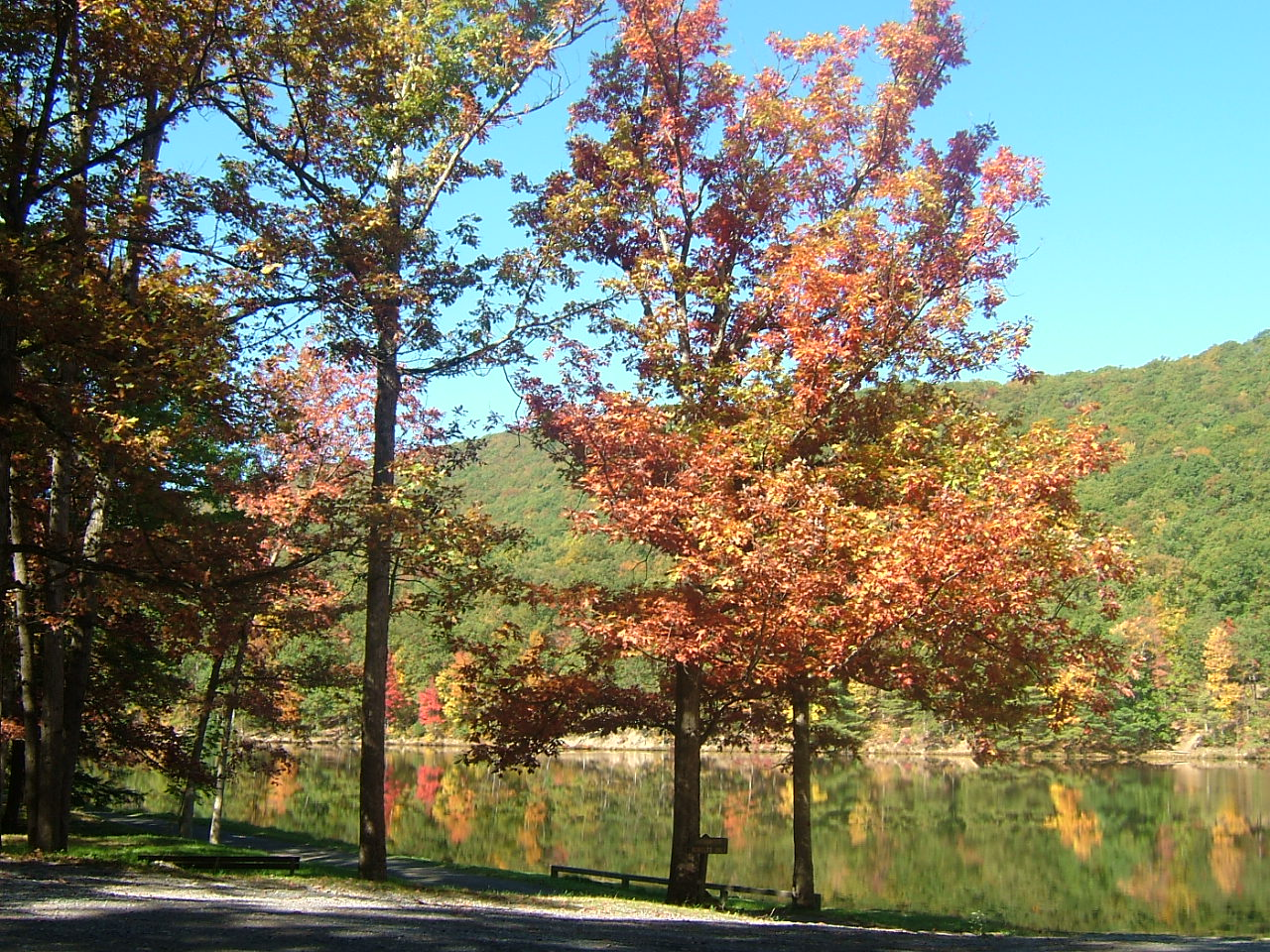

- Location within Pennsylvania Location within the United States
- Interactive map of Poe Valley State Park
- Location: Penn Township, Centre County, Pennsylvania, United States
- Coordinates: 40°49′16″N 77°28′33″W
- Area: 22.73 acres (9.20 ha)
- Elevation: 1,296 feet (395 m)
- Established: 1935
- Administrator: Pennsylvania Department of Conservation and Natural Resources
- Website: Official website
- Pennsylvania State Parks

Poe Valley State Park is a 620-acre (251 ha) Pennsylvania state park in Penn Township, Centre County, Pennsylvania in the United States. The park is surrounded by Bald Eagle State Forest. Poe Paddy State Park is 4 miles (6.4 km) to the east. The forests of the park surround the 25-acre (10 ha) Poe Lake. Poe Valley State Park is in isolated Poe Valley which lies between Potters Mills on U.S. Route 322 and Millheim on Pennsylvania Route 45. The park was closed during the 2008 and 2009 season while the lake was drained for dam repairs and the park facilities were upgraded.

== History ==
Poe Valley State Park and nearby Poe Paddy State Park were built by the Civilian Conservation Corps during the Great Depression of the 1930s. The young men of the CCC also worked to clear the regrowing forests of brush to prevent forest fires. They constructed roads throughout the forests, built state park facilities, constructed bridges on the state roads, planted trees for reforestation, and cleaned streams.

== Poe Lake ==
Poe Lake is a man-made lake covering 25 acres (10 ha), built by the Civilian Conservation Corps on Big Poe Creek during the Great Depression. The lake provides a habitat for perch, pickerel, sunfish, catfish, largemouth bass, and trout. Fishing is permitted in the lake, and non-powered boats such as canoes, kayaks, and johnboats are allowed if they are properly registered with any state. Powered boats must have electric motors as gas powered motors are prohibited. The beach is open from Memorial Day weekend until Labor Day weekend. Ice fishing and ice skating are permitted at the lake during the winter months. Visitors fish and skate at their own risk: the thickness of the ice is not monitored.

== Hunting ==
Hunting is permitted on 450 acres (180 ha) of Poe Valley State Park. Hunters are expected to follow the rules and regulations of the Pennsylvania Game Commission. The common game species are ruffed grouse, squirrels, turkey, white-tailed deer, and black bears. The hunting of groundhogs is prohibited. The shores of Poe Lake are closed to hunting.

== Trails ==
Reeds Gap Spur Trail is a hiking trail 18 miles (29 km) long, that begins in Reeds Gap State Park and ends in Poe Valley State Park. The other trails in the park all connect with the system of hiking trails in Bald Eagle State Forest. The Pennsylvania Mid State Trail, a hiking trail 306 miles (492 km) long, passes through Poe Valley. Hunters use the trails to access Bald Eagle State Forest. During the winter the trails are open to cross-country skiing and recreational snowmobile use.

== Camping and picnicking ==
Camping: flush toilets, warm showers, electric hook-ups.
The campground opens the second Friday in April and closes in early December. There are 45 campsites, which accommodate tents, trailers and motor homes. 27 sites have 50 amp electric hookups. The campground has a sanitary dump station, showers, flush toilets and drinking water. Trash and recycling containers are at the campground entrance. Most campsites are shaded and are within walking distance to all other park facilities. Alcoholic beverages and unlicensed motor vehicles are prohibited. Pets are permitted on designated sites. Free Camping for Campground Hosts: 1 host site. The campground host site has amenities that include 50-amp electric service. The host is required to assist park personnel for 40 hours per week with an initial two-week stay. Contact the park office for additional information and availability.

Camping Cottages: There are three camping cottages in the campground that comfortably sleep five people. Each cottage has three single bunks and a full-sized bed, a table with benches, electric lights and receptacles, electric heat and a porch with a table. There is a fire ring and picnic table at each site. The cottages are available during the camping season from the second Friday in April to early December. Up to two dogs are permitted in Cottage 11 for a fee.

Deluxe Camping Cottage: Located in the campground, the deluxe cottage has two rooms. The bedroom sleeps five people in bunk beds (three twin mattresses and one full size mattress). The kitchen/dining area contains a stove, microwave, refrigerator, countertop, table, chairs, and electric heat and outlets. There is no water in the cottage, but water is available at the nearby shower house. Outside there is a picnic table on the porch and a nearby fire ring. The camping season begins the second Friday in April and ends in early December.

Picnicking: The shaded picnic area is by Poe Lake and has drinking water, playground areas, charcoal grills and charcoal disposal containers and accessible picnic tables. One picnic pavilion can be reserved up to 11 months in advance for a fee. If not reserved, the picnic pavilion is free on a first-come, first-served basis.

== Winter activities ==
Access to Poe Valley during the winter months may be limited. Winter maintenance is not performed on park roads or state forest roads that access Poe Valley. Caution must be used when traveling to Poe Valley during the winter season.

Cross-country skiing: While no specific trails are provided, most skiers use local roads since only minimal snow plowing is done in this area. Skiers should be cautious since both snowmobiles and four-wheel drive vehicles also use many of these roads.

Snowmobiling: Registered snowmobiles may use Poe Valley Road that travels through the park and surrounding state forest roads daily after the end of the rifle deer season in December. Snowmobiles are not permitted on interior park roads or Poe Lake. Most forestry roads are joint-use roads shared by snowmobiles and motor vehicles.

Ice fishing: Ice fishing is popular. Ice thickness is not monitored.
