= Simon Pickle Stone House =

Historic house in Pennsylvania, United States

- U.S. National Register of Historic Places
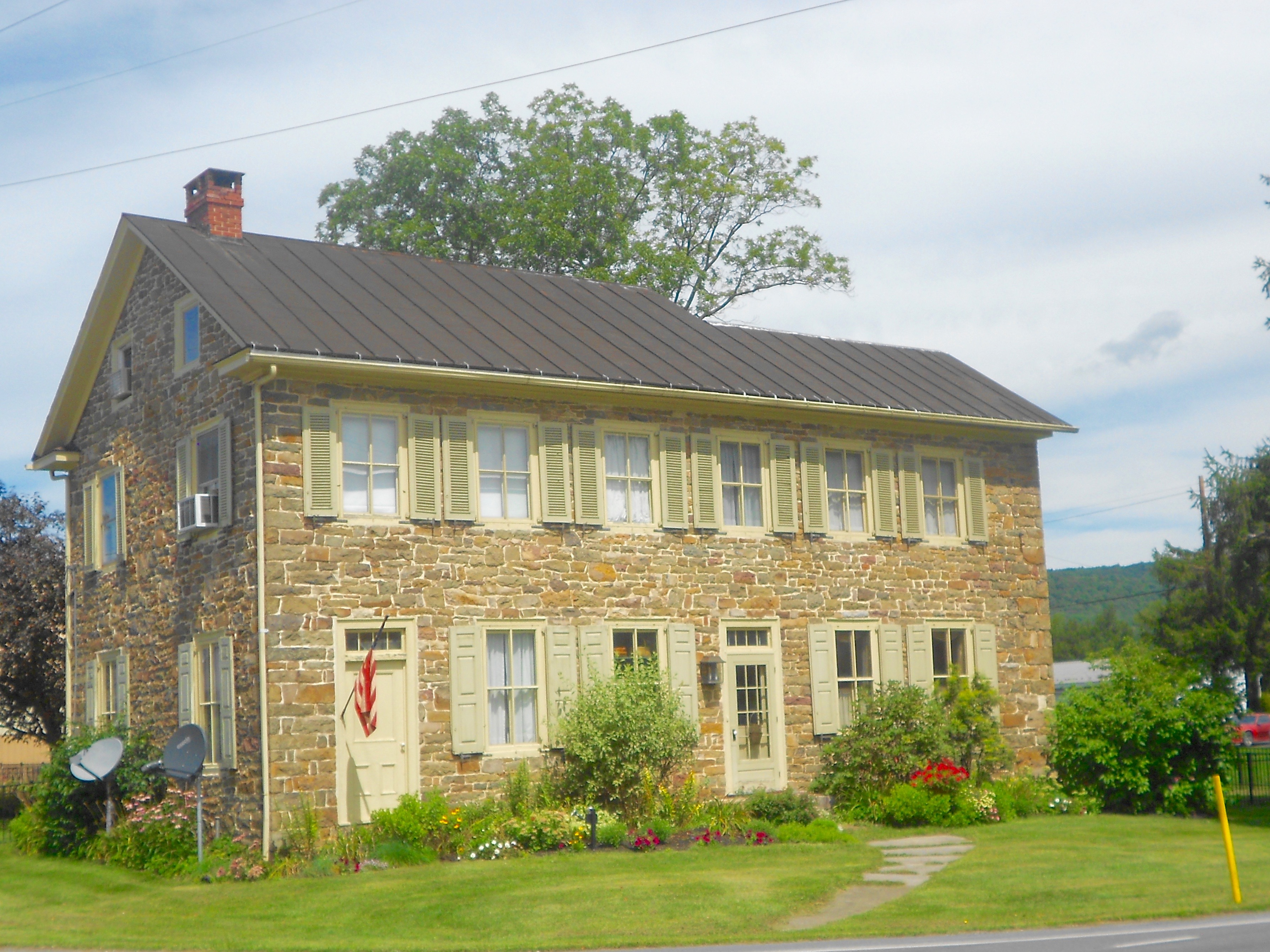
- House in 2015

- Location within Pennsylvania Location within the United States
- Location: Junction of Pennsylvania Routes 192 and 445 at Madisonburg, Miles Township, Pennsylvania
- Coordinates: 40°55′24″N 77°30′54″W
- Area: 0.1 acres (0.040 ha)
- Built: 1833
- NRHP reference No.: 77001144
- Added to NRHP: April 18, 1977

Simon Pickle Stone House is a historic home located at Miles Township, Centre County, Pennsylvania. It was built in 1833, and is a 2 1/2-story sandstone building, with a 1 1/2-story kitchen wing. It has a two-story, frame store and summer kitchen addition built about 1850. The house was remodeled between 1911 and 1920.

It was added to the National Register of Historic Places in 1977.

== Gallery ==
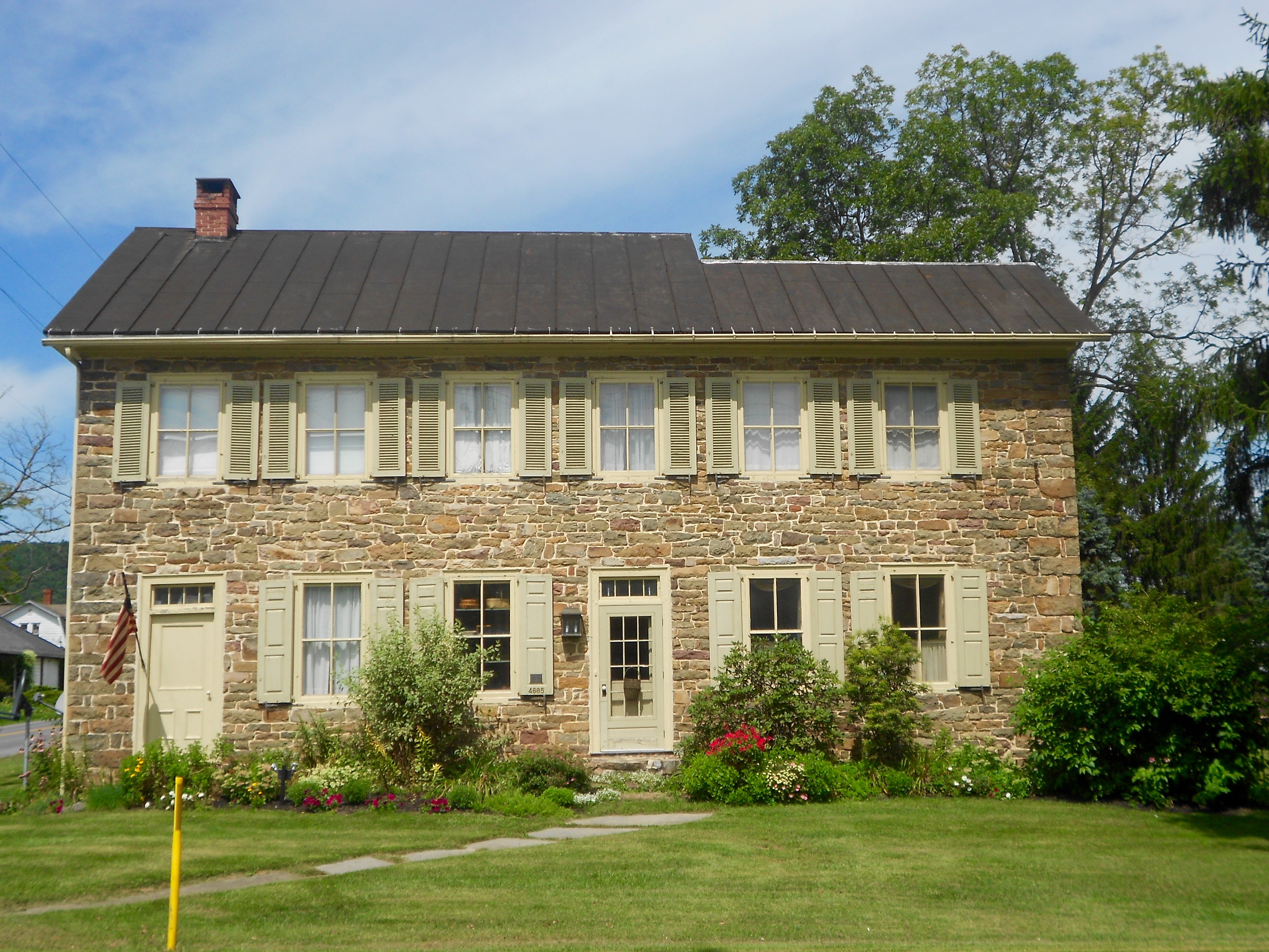
View from south

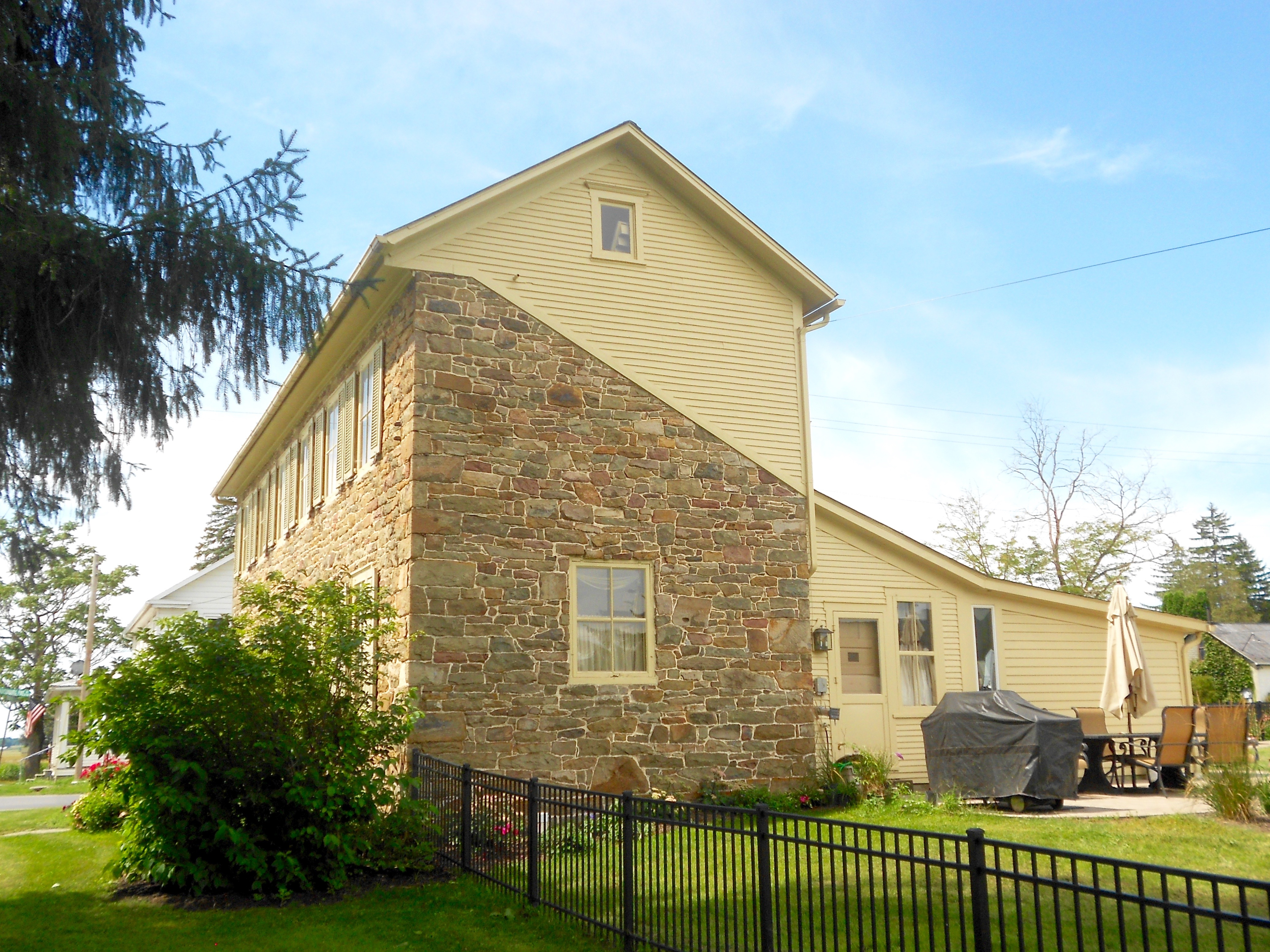
View from east

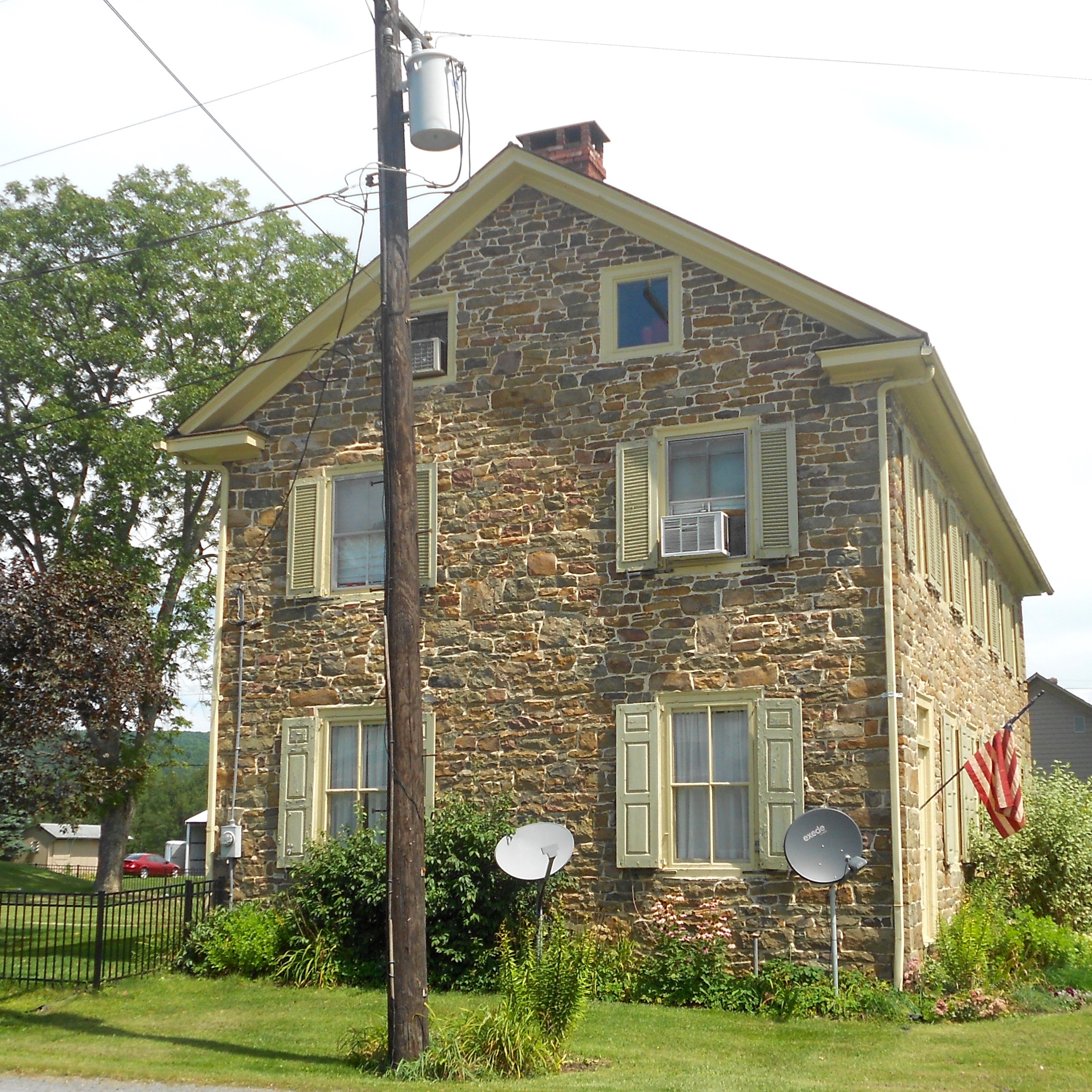
View from southwest
