= Bald Eagle Area School District =

School district in Pennsylvania, U.S.

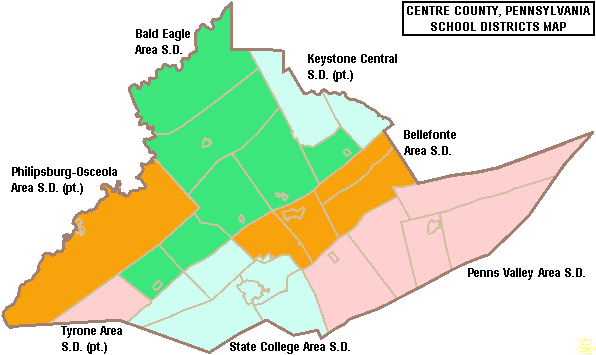

Address
- 751 South Eagle Valley Road Wingate, Pennsylvania, 16823; United States

District information
- Type: Public

Students and staff
- District mascot: Eagles
- Colors: Blue and gold

Other information
- Website: School: www.beasd.org Athletics: www.beaathletics.org

The Bald Eagle Area School District is a midsized, suburban/rural public school district located in Centre County, Pennsylvania. The district serves the Boroughs of Howard, Milesburg, Port Matilda, Snow Shoe and Unionville and Boggs Township, Burnside Township, Howard Township, Huston Township, Snow Shoe Township, Union Township and Worth Township in Centre County, Pennsylvania. Bald Eagle Area School District encompasses approximately 345 square miles (890 km^{2}). According to 2000 federal census data, it serves a resident population of 12,882. By 2010, the district's population increased to 13,218.

According to the Pennsylvania Budget and Policy Center, 39.8% of the Bald Eagle Area School District's pupils lived at 185% or below the Federal Poverty Level as shown by their eligibility or reduced price school meal programs in 2012. In 2013, the Pennsylvania Department of Education reported that 43 teachers in the Bald Eagle Area School District are homeless. In 2009, the district residents' per capita income was $16,785, while the median family income was $42,854. In the Commonwealth, the median family income was $49,501 and the United States median family income was $49,445, in 2010. In Centre County, the median household income was $50,336. By 2013, the median household income in the United States rose to $52,100. In 2014, the median household income in the United States was $53,700.

Bald Eagle Area School District operates a combined junior senior high school (6th – 12th), Bald Eagle Area Cyber Academy and 4 elementary schools: Howard Elementary School, Mountaintop Area Elementary School, Port Matilda Elementary School and Wingate Elementary School. High school students may choose to attend the Central Pennsylvania Institute of Science & Technology for training in the construction and mechanical trades. The Central Intermediate Unit IU10 provides the district with a wide variety of services like: specialized education for disabled students; state mandated training on recognizing and reporting child abuse; speech and visual disability services; criminal background check processing for prospective employees and professional development for staff and faculty.

== Extracurriculars ==
The district offers a wide variety of clubs, activities and interscholastic athletics.

=== Clubs ===
- Bookends
- Drama Club
- Yearbook – Aquila
- FFA

=== Athletics ===
Boys:

- Baseball – AA
- Basketball- AA
- Cross Country – AA
- Football – AA
- Indoor Track and Field – AAAA
- Soccer – AA
- Track and Field – AA
- Wrestling - AA

Girls:

- Basketball – AA
- Cheer – AAAA
- Cross Country – A
- Indoor Track and Field – AAAA
- Soccer (Fall) – A
- Softball – AA
- Track and Field – AA
- Volleyball – AA

Junior High School Sports

Boys:

- Basketball
- Football
- Soccer
- Track and Field
- Wrestling

Girls:

- Basketball
- Cheer
- Soccer (Fall)
- Softball
- Track and Field

According to PIAA directory July 2013
