= Centre Mills =

- U.S. National Register of Historic Places
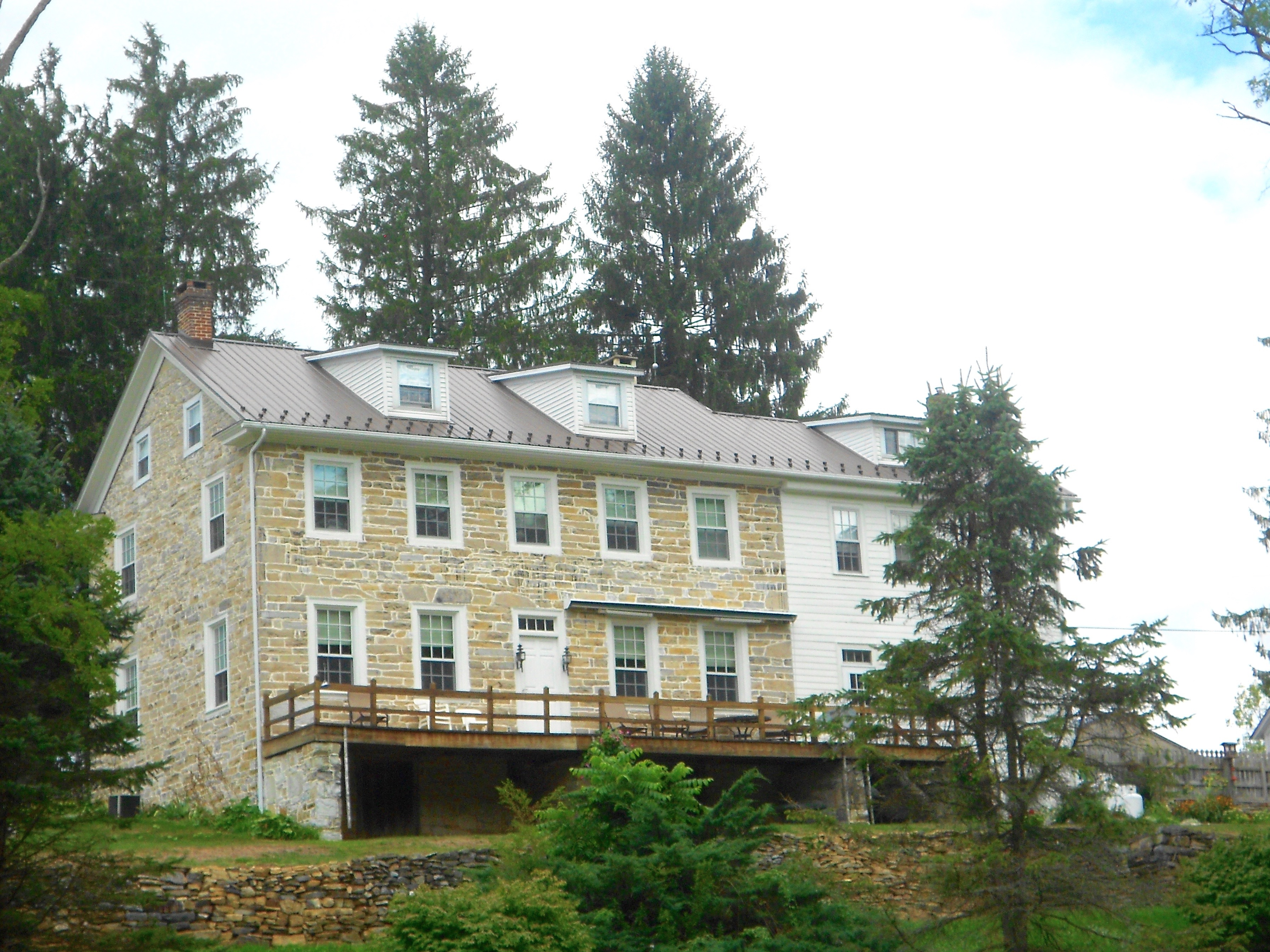
- Rear of the miller's house

- Location within Pennsylvania Location within the United States
- Nearest city: Southwest of Rebersburg off Pennsylvania Route 445, Miles Township, Pennsylvania
- Coordinates: 40°55′32″N 77°28′21″W
- Area: 9.5 acres (3.8 ha)
- Built: 1802-1803
- NRHP reference No.: 76001621
- Added to NRHP: December 12, 1976

Centre Mills is a historic grist mill located at Miles Township, Centre County, Pennsylvania. It was built in 1802-1803, and is a two-story fieldstone building, with a basement and attic. It measures 44 feet, 10 inches, by 58 feet, and has a gable roof. Also on the property are a barn, stone house, and miller's house. The stone house was built in 1813, and is a two-story stone dwelling, measuring 40 feet by 30 feet, with a two-story frame addition. It features a porch supported by Corinthian order columns. The miller's house is a frame dwelling on a stone foundation. The stone house is operated as a bed and breakfast.

It was added to the National Register of Historic Places in 1976.

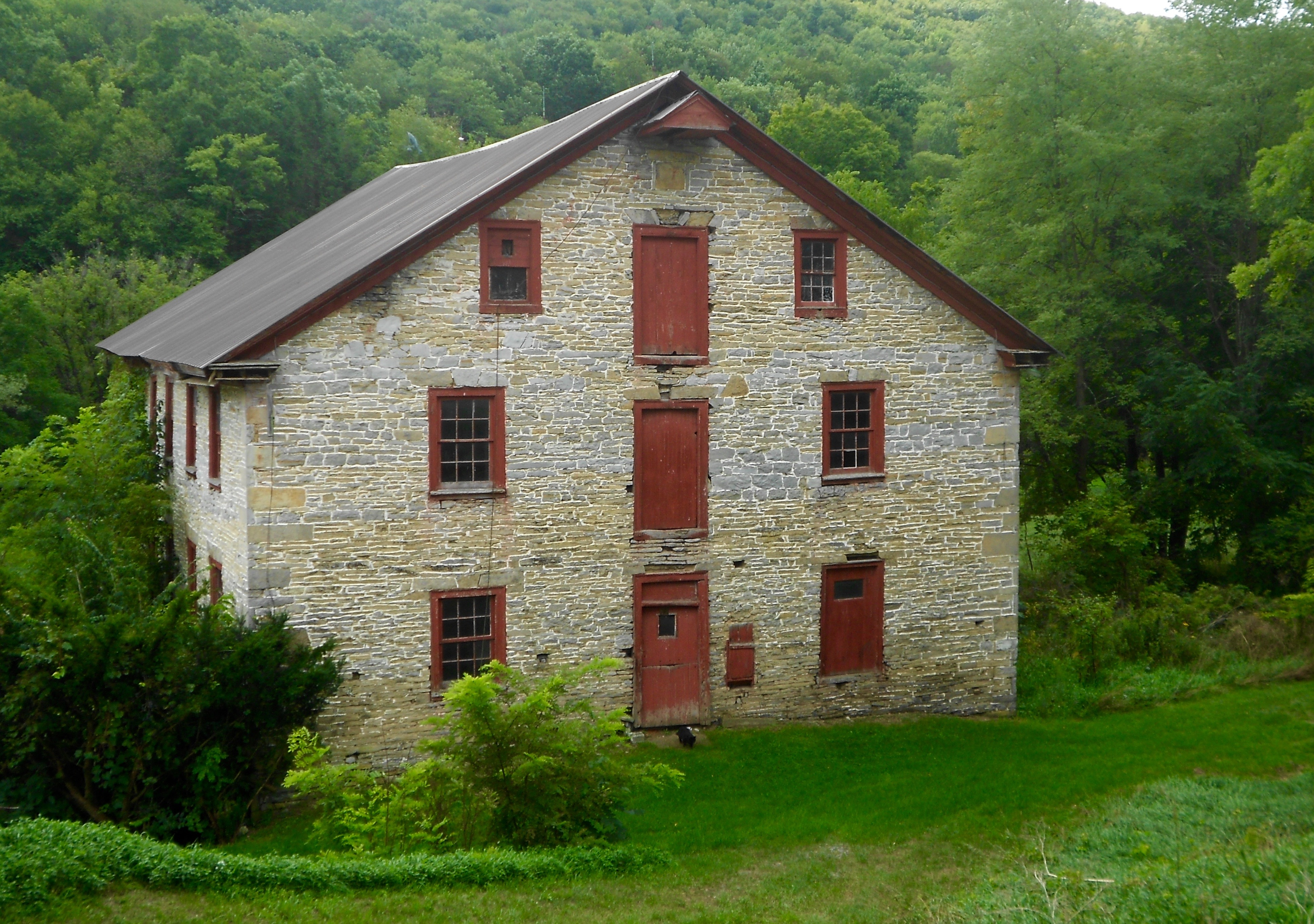
Front of the mill

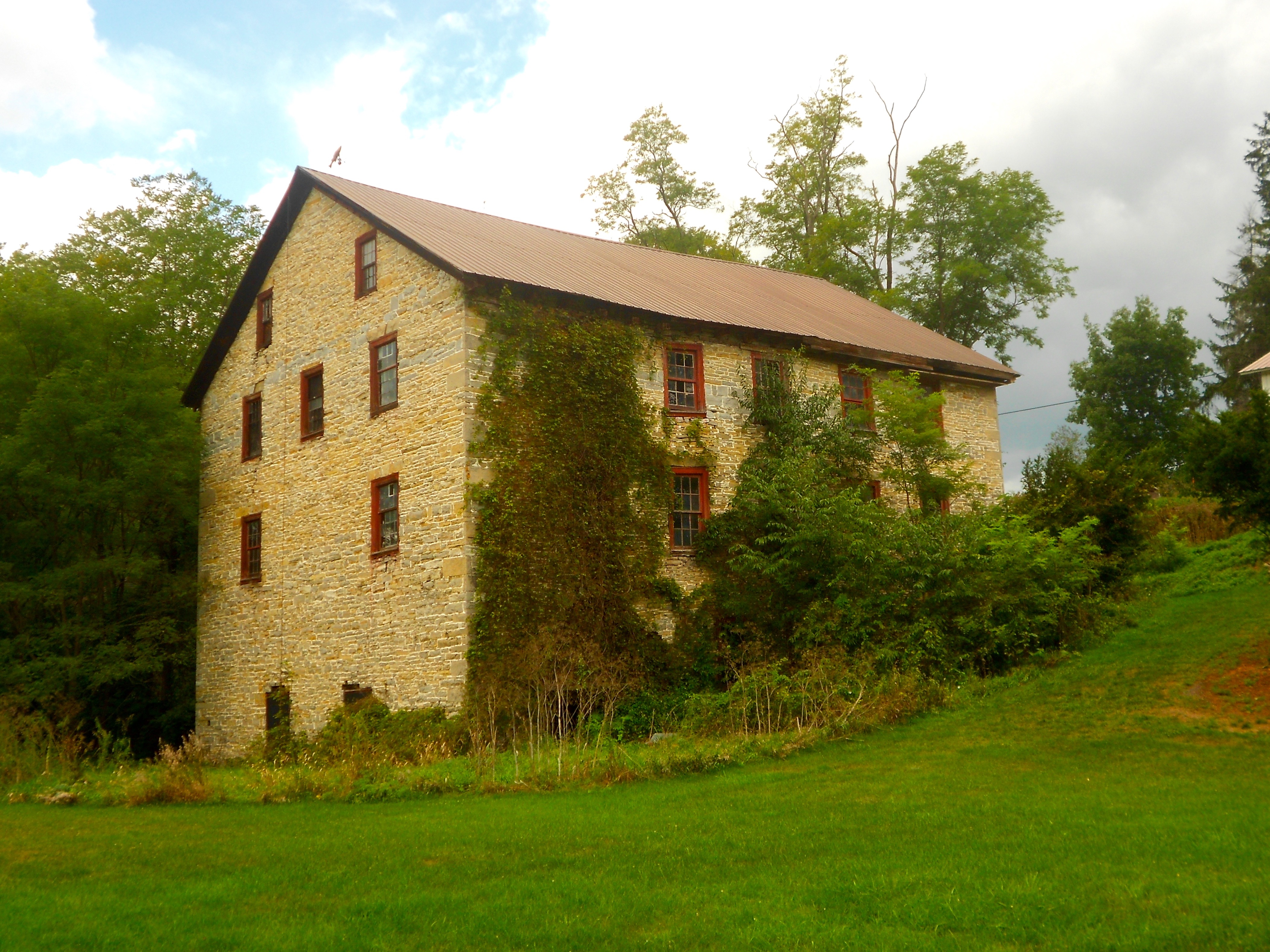
Rear of the mill
