= Penns Valley Area School District =

School district in Pennsylvania

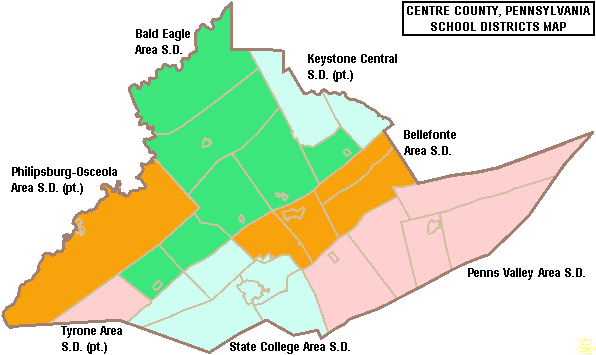

Address
- 4528 Penns Valley Road Spring Mills, Centre County, Pennsylvania, 16875-9403; United States

Other information
- Website: http://pennsvalley.org/

Penns Valley Area Junior-Senior High School

Location
- 4545 Penns Valley Road; Spring Mills, (Centre County), Pennsylvania 16875; United States; 40.880065°N 77.529859°W

Information
- Type: Public high school
- Principal: Zac Wynkoop
- Staff: 49.72 (FTE)
- Enrollment: 649 (2023-24)
- Student to teacher ratio: 13.05
- Colors: Navy, white, and gray
- Nickname: Rams
- Website: Penns Valley Area Junior-Senior High School

The Penns Valley Area School District is a small rural, public school district serving the south-eastern portions of Centre County, Pennsylvania. It encompasses the boroughs of Centre Hall and Millheim, Pennsylvania, as well as the townships of Potter, Gregg, Penn, Miles, and Haines. It encompasses an area of 254.4 square miles (659 km^{2}). The school district had a population of 11,380, according to the 2000 federal census. By 2010, the district's population grew to 12,830 people. The educational attainment levels for the Penns Valley Area School District population (25 years old and over) were 87% high school graduates and 21.5% college graduates. The district is one of the 500 public school districts of Pennsylvania.

According to the Pennsylvania Budget and Policy Center, 30.4% of the district's pupils lived at 185% or below the Federal Poverty Level as shown by their eligibility for the federal free or reduced price school meal programs in 2012. In 2009, the district residents’ per capita income was $18,328, while the median family income was $44,458. In Centre County, the median household income was $50,333. In the Commonwealth of Pennsylvania, the median family income was $49,501 and the United States median family income was $49,445, in 2010. By 2013, the median household income in the United States rose to $52,100. In 2014, the median household income in the USA was $53,700.

Special education, criminal background check processing for prospective employees and professional development for staff and faculty are provided by district employees and the Central Intermediate Unit CIU10. Occupational training and adult education in various vocational and technical fields were provided by the district and the Central Pennsylvania Institute of Science and Technology, which is located in Pleasant Gap.

== Schools ==
- Centre Hall-Potter Elementary School
  211 N. Hoffer Av.
  Centre Hall, Pennsylvania 16828
- Miles Township Elementary School
  80 Town Lane Rd.
  Rebersburg, Pennsylvania 16872
- Penns Valley Elementary School
  4528 Penns Valley Rd.
  Spring Mills, Pennsylvania 16875
- Penns Valley Intermediate School
  4528 Penns Valley Rd.
  Spring Mills, Pennsylvania 16875
- Penns Valley Area High School
  4545 Penns Valley Rd.
  Spring Mills, Pennsylvania 16875

== Extracurriculars ==
Penns Valley Area School District offers a wide variety of clubs, activities and an extensive sports program.

=== Sports ===
The district funds:

Varsity

Boys

- Baseball - AA
- Basketball - AA
- Cross Country - A
- Football and JV team - AA
- Golf - AA
- Soccer - A
- Track and Field - AA
- Wrestling - AA

Girls

- Basketball - AA
- Cross Country - A
- Golf - AA
- Soccer (Fall) - A
- Softball - AA
- Track and Field - AA
- Volleyball - A

Junior High Sports

Boys

- Basketball
- Football
- Soccer
- Track and Field
- Wrestling

Girls

- Basketball
- Soccer (fall)
- Softball
- Track and Field

According to PIAA directory July 2015
