= Central Pennsylvania Institute of Science and Technology =

Central Pennsylvania Institute of Science & Technology
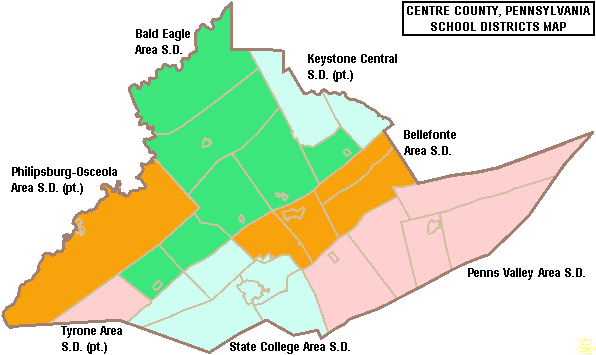

Location
- 540 North Harrison Road; Pleasant Gap, Centre County, Pennsylvania 16823-8644; United States

Information
- Type: Public
- Opened: 1969
- School board: locally selected members representing each member school district
- Faculty: 20
- Grades: 9-12
- Enrollment: 360 pupils (2015-16)
- Language: English
- Accreditation: Pennsylvania State Board of Vocational Education
- Website: http://www.cpi.edu/about.php

Central Pennsylvania Institute of Science & Technology is a regional vocational technical training school serving local public schools and adult learners. The school was established in 1969 by the Centre County public school districts. The School was formerly known as Centre County Vocational-Technical School. The school is governed by a board made up of school board directors from the four sending public school districts. The members are selected by the president of their respective school board and serve one year terms. The superintendent is from one of the sending districts and serves a one-year term on a rotating basis. In 2015, enrollment was 360 pupils. The complex is located in Pleasant Gap, within the Bellefonte Area School District's attendance region.

The school offers both in-person and online courses to students from Bald Eagle Area, Bellefonte, and Penns Valley Area school districts. In 2015, the majority of students (41%) came from Bald Eagle Area School District. Bellefonte Area School District students were 39% of enrolled pupils. The school also offers courses for adults from the Centre County region.

== History ==
The school was established in 1969 as the Centre County Vocational-Technical School. The name was changed 30 years later to advertise the technological courses that the school offered for students.
