= Haines Township, Pennsylvania =

Township in Pennsylvania, US

Coordinates: 40°55′00″N 77°24′59″W

- Township
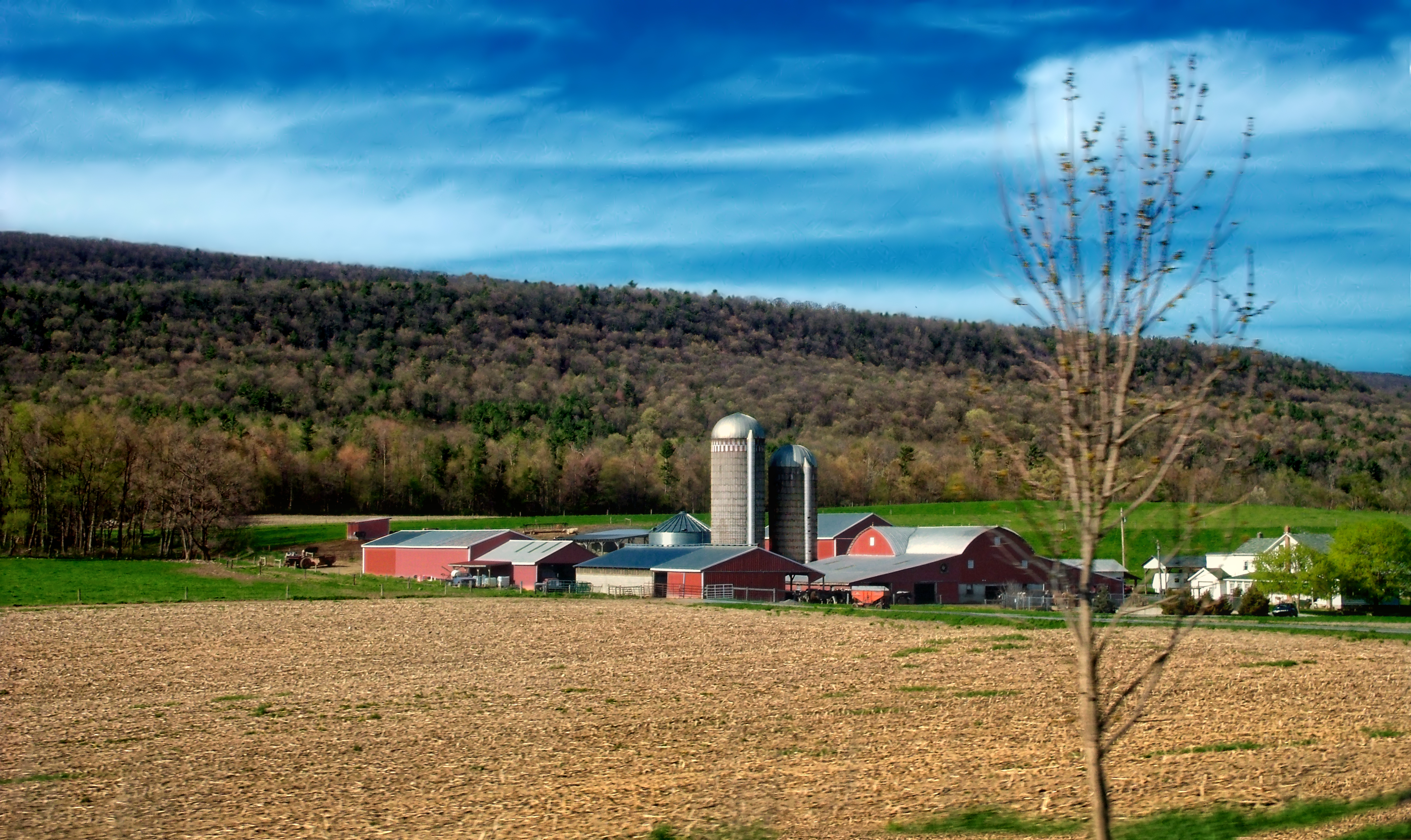
- A farm in Haines Township

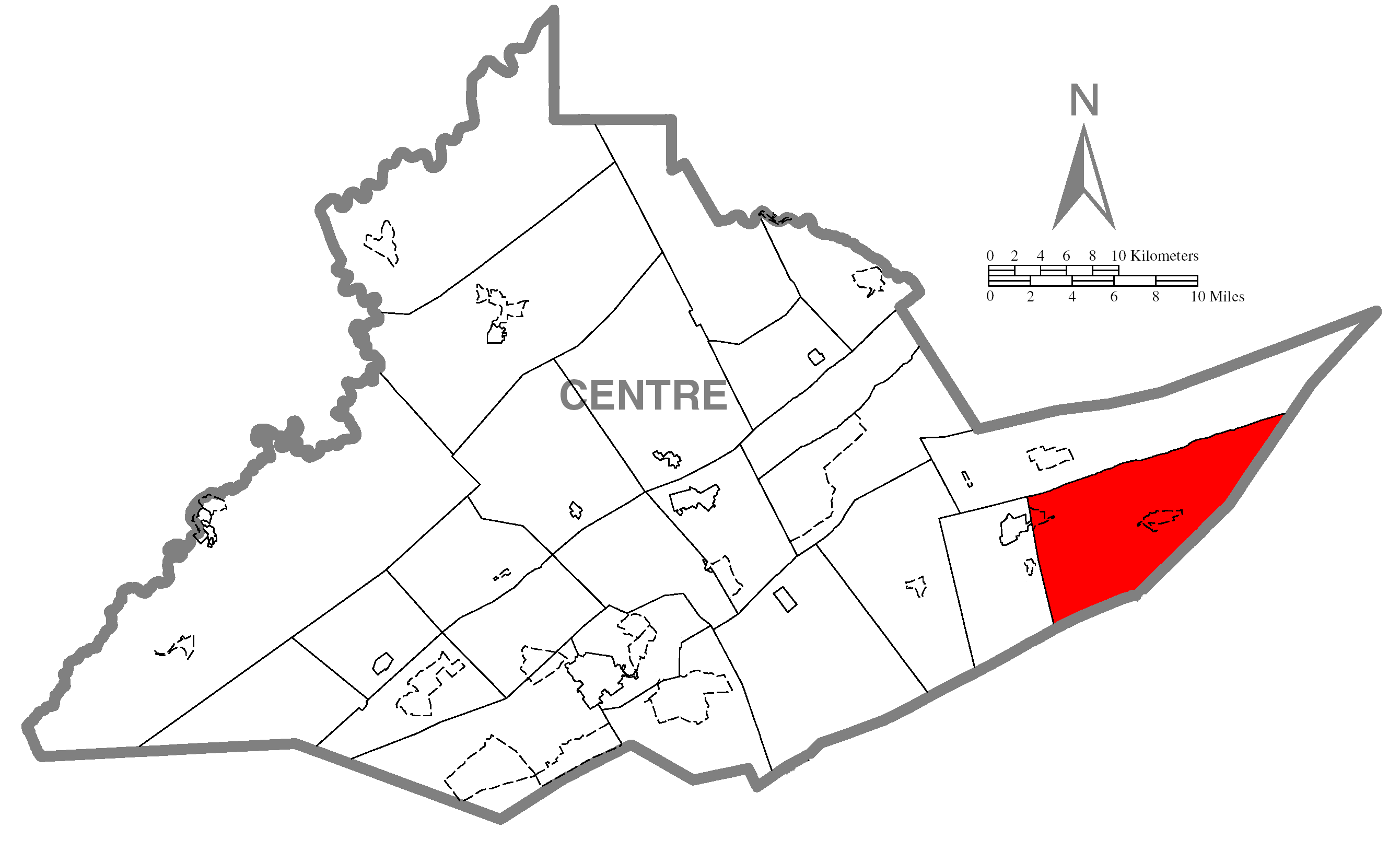
- Map of Centre County, Pennsylvania highlighting Haines Township

- Map of Centre County, Pennsylvania
- Country: United States
- State: Pennsylvania
- County: Centre
- Settled: 1775
- Incorporated: 1801

Area
  - Total: 57.36 sq mi (148.56 km^{2})
  - Land: 57.29 sq mi (148.37 km^{2})
  - Water: 0.073 sq mi (0.19 km^{2})

Population (2020)
  - Total: 1,663 ▲
  - Estimate (2021): 1,644
  - Density: 27.3/sq mi (10.55/km^{2})
- Time zone: UTC-5 (EST)
  - Summer (DST): UTC-4 (EDT)
- FIPS code: 42-027-31960
- Website: www.hainestwp.org

Haines Township is a township in Centre County, Pennsylvania, United States. It is part of the State College, Pennsylvania Metropolitan Statistical Area. The population was 1,663 at the 2020 census.

== Geography ==
According to the United States Census Bureau, the township has a total area of 57.4 square miles (148.6 km^{2}), all land.

Haines Township is bordered by Miles Township to the north, Union County to the east, Mifflin County to the south, and Penn Township to the west. It is part of the Penns Valley region of Centre County.

The township contains the census-designated places of Aaronsburg and Woodward.

== Demographics ==
Historical population
Census	Pop.	Note	%±
2000	1,479		—
2010	1,564		5.7%
2020	1,663		6.3%
2021 (est.)	1,644		−1.1%
U.S. Decennial Census

As of the census of 2000, there were 1,479 people, 529 households, and 398 families residing in the township. The population density was 25.6 people per square mile (9.9/km^{2}). There were 669 housing units at an average density of 11.6/sq mi (4.5/km^{2}). The racial makeup of the township was 98.99% White, 0.07% African American, 0.07% Native American, 0.74% Asian, 0.07% from other races, and 0.07% from two or more races. Hispanic or Latino of any race were 0.68% of the population.

There were 529 households, out of which 31.6% had children under the age of 18 living with them, 65.6% were married couples living together, 6.8% had a female householder with no husband present, and 24.6% were non-families. 20.4% of all households were made up of individuals, and 9.6% had someone living alone who was 65 years of age or older. The average household size was 2.80 and the average family size was 3.26.

In the township the population was spread out, with 29.3% under the age of 18, 6.8% from 18 to 24, 28.9% from 25 to 44, 20.8% from 45 to 64, and 14.2% who were 65 years of age or older. The median age was 36 years. For every 100 females, there were 96.2 males. For every 100 females age 18 and over, there were 97.4 males.

The median income for a household in the township was $37,381, and the median income for a family was $41,544. Males had a median income of $26,750 versus $22,500 for females. The per capita income for the township was $15,993. About 8.9% of families and 16.0% of the population were below the poverty line, including 24.8% of those under age 18 and 8.6% of those age 65 or over.

== Education ==
Haines Township is in the Penns Valley Area School District.
