= Eagle Creek, Pennsylvania =

Unincorporated community in Pennsylvania, US

- Census-designated place
- Location within Pennsylvania Location within the United States
- Coordinates: 40°53′43″N 77°53′31″W
- Country: United States
- State: Pennsylvania
- County: Centre
- Township: Union

Area
  - Total: 0.62 sq mi (1.60 km^{2})
  - Land: 0.62 sq mi (1.60 km^{2})
  - Water: 0 sq mi (0.00 km^{2})
- Elevation: 798 ft (243 m)

Population (2020)
  - Total: 132
  - Density: 214.3/sq mi (82.74/km^{2})
- Time zone: UTC-5 (Eastern (EST))
  - Summer (DST): UTC-4 (EDT)
- ZIP Code: 16844 (Julian)
- Area codes: 814/582
- FIPS code: 42-20604
- GNIS feature ID: 2805488

Eagle Creek is a census-designated place (CDP) in Centre County, Pennsylvania, United States. It was first listed as a CDP prior to the 2020 census.

The CDP is in south-central Centre County, in the southern part of Union Township. It is bordered to the northeast by the borough of Unionville and to the southeast by Julian. Eagle Creek sits in the valley of Bald Eagle Creek, a northeastward-flowing tributary of the West Branch Susquehanna River. Dicks Run flows through the CDP from northwest to southeast to join Bald Eagle Creek at the southern border of the CDP. Bald Eagle Mountain rises 900 feet (270 m) above the community on the south side of Bald Eagle Creek.

U.S. Route 220 Alternate runs through the CDP, following the Bald Eagle Creek valley. It leads northeast through Unionville 7 miles (11 km) to Interstate 80 at Milesburg and southwest 11 miles (18 km) to Port Matilda.

The CDP is highlighted by the junction of South Eagle Valley Road and Dix Run Road, which follows Dicks Run, then continues to Beaver Road north of Julian.

== Demographics ==
Historical population
Census	Pop.	Note	%±
2020	132		—
U.S. Decennial Census
