= Doris Grove =

American glider pilot

Doris Grove is an American world record breaking glider pilot, flight instructor, and a member of the U.S. Soaring Hall of Fame. She was an early pioneer of ridge soaring in the Ridge-and-valley Appalachians in the 1970s, ultimately setting three world records flying gliders there, and becoming the first woman to earn the FAI 1000 km Diploma. She was also a stunt co-pilot in the 1999 film The Thomas Crown Affair.

Grove currently lives near State College, Pennsylvania. Her husband Thomas Knauff, another hall of fame glider pilot, died in February 2024. They owned and operated the Ridge Soaring Gliderport in Julian, Pennsylvania, which they founded in 1975. Sadly, the glider port closed in 2022.

== World glider records ==
- Single-place glider, Feminine
  - Out-and-return distance: 731.27 km, 7 April 1979, Ridge Soaring Gliderport, Julian, Pennsylvania, Schleicher ASW 19
  - Out-and-return distance: 1000.86 km, 11 Mar 1980, Ridge Soaring Gliderport, Julian, Pennsylvania, Schleicher ASW 19
  - Out-and-return distance: 1127.68 km, 28 September 1981, Piper Memorial Airport, Lock Haven, Pennsylvania, Schempp-Hirth Nimbus 2

== Other flying accomplishments ==
- 1000 K Diploma, first woman, U.S. #12 (Int #24) 1980
- SSA Exceptional Achievement Award 1981
- Eaton Trophy (with T. Knauff) 2000
- Certificate of Appreciation (with T. Knauff) 2005

Source: Soaring Hall of Fame.

== Books authored ==
- Federal Aviation Regulations for Glider Pilots, 1996
- Accident Prevention Manual for Glider Flight Instructors, with Thomas Knauff, 2nd edition, 1993, (No ISBN)
- Accident Prevention Manual for Glider Pilots, with Thomas Knauff, 1992.
- Judgment Training Manual for Glider Pilots, with Doris Grove, 1985. OCLC 61776977
- Glider Basics from Solo to License with Thomas Knauff, et al., 1st ed, 1984. ISBN 0-9605676-2-3
