= Michelle Urry =

American cartoonist

Michelle Urry (28 December 1939 – 15 October 2006, born Michelle Dorothy Kaplan) was the cartoon editor of Playboy magazine for over 30 years. Together with Hugh Hefner, she edited the retrospective Playboy: 50 Years The Cartoons. Among the cartoonists whose career she is credited with developing is B. Kliban. On learning of her death, Jules Feiffer told the New York Times she was the "mother superior to cartoonists."

Urry was born in Winnipeg, Manitoba. As a child, she collected comic books rather than the dolls favored by other girls of her age. She graduated from UCLA, and after running a dress shop she moved to Chicago, taking a low-level staff job with Playboy in the late 1960s. Michelle Kaplan first married Jack Altman in Chicago in 1966. Both were working in Chicago at the time. The couple divorced in 1969. By 1971 Urry had become the magazine's cartoon editor, and she held that post until her death.

In 1974, while visiting B. Kliban in his San Francisco studio, Urry was struck by a group of Kliban's offhand cartoons of cats, bought several of them, and prodded Kliban to create a book-length collection of similar work. Kliban's Cat became a best-selling book the next year, and spawned a wide range of popular merchandise.

She married sculptor Stephen Urry and the couple had one child, Caleb Urry. After Stephen's death in 1993, she married Alan Trustman, a screenwriter who is best known for The Thomas Crown Affair and Bullitt.

Aside from her primary job at Playboy, Urry served as a cartoon editor or consulting editor at many other magazines, including Good Housekeeping and Modern Maturity.
