= Union Township, Centre County, Pennsylvania =

Township in Pennsylvania, US

Coordinates: 40°57′00″N 77°54′59″W

- Township
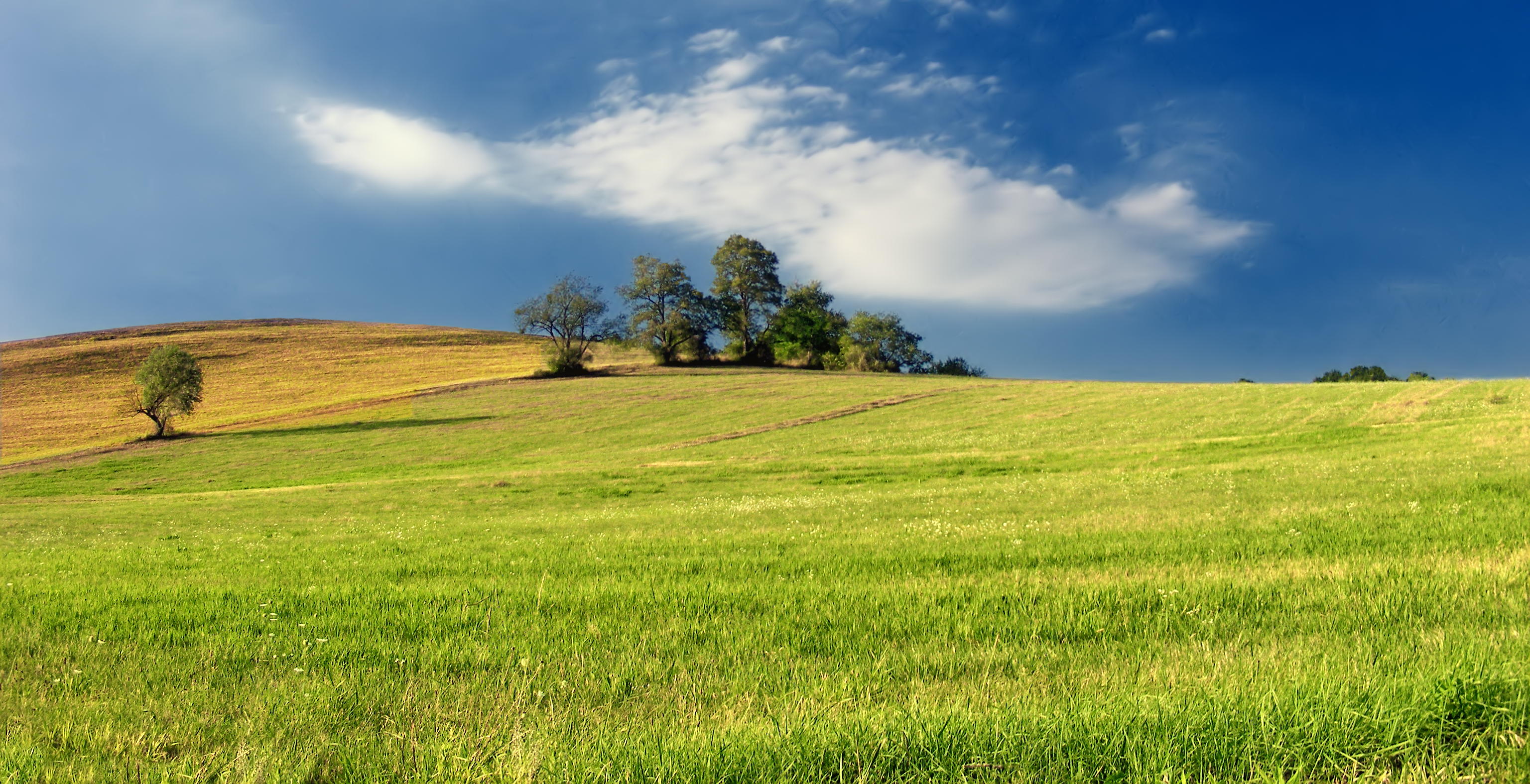
- A farm in Union Township

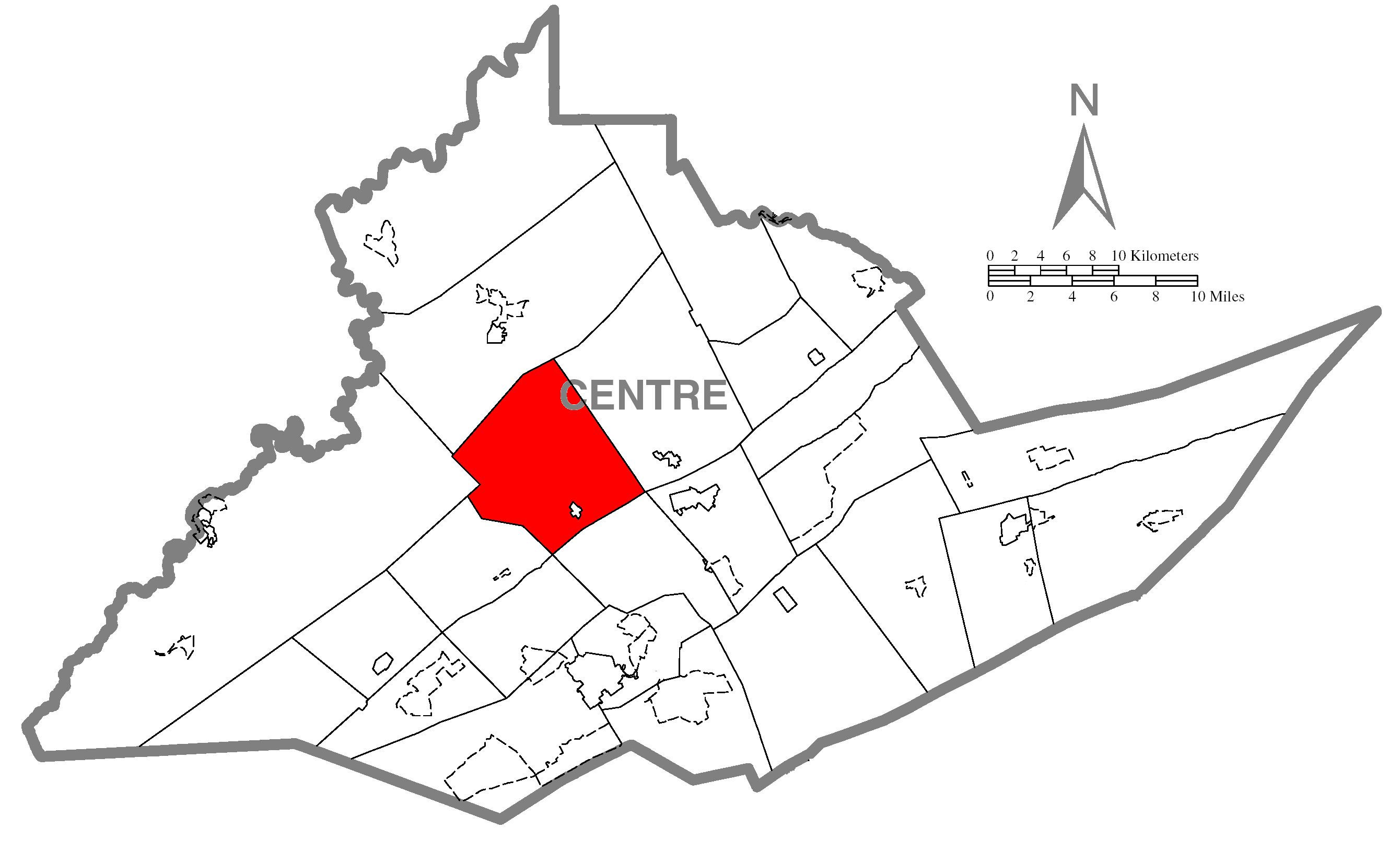
- Map of Centre County, Pennsylvania highlighting Union Township

- Map of Centre County, Pennsylvania
- Country: United States
- State: Pennsylvania
- County: Centre
- Settled: 1770
- Incorporated: 1850

Area
  - Total: 46.74 sq mi (121.06 km^{2})
  - Land: 46.74 sq mi (121.06 km^{2})
  - Water: 0 sq mi (0.00 km^{2})

Population (2020)
  - Total: 1,380 ▼
  - Estimate (2021): 1,373
  - Density: 30/sq mi (11.7/km^{2})
- FIPS code: 42-027-78288
- Website: https://uniontownship.org/

Union Township is a township that is located in Centre County, Pennsylvania, United States. It is part of the State College, Pennsylvania Metropolitan Statistical Area.

The population was 1,380 at the time of the 2020 census, a decline from the figure of 1,383 that was documented in 2010.

== Geography ==
According to the United States Census Bureau, the township has a total area of 46.8 square miles (121.1 km^{2}), all land.

Union Township is bordered by Snow Shoe Township to the northwest, Boggs Township to the northeast, Benner Township to the southeast, Huston Township to the southwest, and Rush Township to the west. The township surrounds the borough of Unionville, and the census-designated place of Eagle Creek is in the southern part of the township.

== Demographics ==
Historical population
Census	Pop.	Note	%±
2000	1,200		—
2010	1,383		15.3%
2020	1,380		−0.2%
2021 (est.)	1,373		−0.5%
U.S. Decennial Census

As of the census of 2000, there were 1,200 people, 448 households, and 361 families residing in the township. The population density was 25.8 inhabitants per square mile (10.0/km^{2}). There were 506 housing units at an average density of 10.9/sq mi (4.2/km^{2}). The racial makeup of the township was 99.00% White, 0.33% African American, 0.17% Asian, 0.08% Pacific Islander, and 0.42% from two or more races. Hispanic or Latino of any race were 0.75% of the population.

There were 448 households, out of which 34.4% had children under the age of 18 living with them, 69.4% were married couples living together, 4.9% had a female householder with no husband present, and 19.4% were non-families. 16.1% of all households were made up of individuals, and 6.7% had someone living alone who was 65 years of age or older. The average household size was 2.68 and the average family size was 2.99.

In the township the population was spread out, with 24.4% under the age of 18, 7.1% from 18 to 24, 30.6% from 25 to 44, 26.5% from 45 to 64, and 11.4% who were 65 years of age or older. The median age was 39 years. For every 100 females, there were 110.2 males. For every 100 females age 18 and over, there were 104.3 males.

The median income for a household in the township was $41,806, and the median income for a family was $45,568. Males had a median income of $31,172 versus $22,734 for females. The per capita income for the township was $18,468. About 6.3% of families and 9.2% of the population were below the poverty line, including 15.1% of those under age 18 and 7.9% of those age 65 or over.
