= Southee =

Southee in an English-language surname

Notable people with this name include:

- E. A. Southee (1890–1968), Australian agriculture educator
- Earl R. Southee (1892–1967), early American aviator
- Jim Southee (1902–1979), Australian politician
- Tim Southee (born 1988), New Zealand cricketer
