= Thomas Knauff =

- Born: April 27,1938
- Died: February 21, 2024 (aged 85)
- Occupations: Writer; Glider pilot Flight instructor
- Writing career
- Genre: Non-fiction
- Subject: Aviation

Thomas L. Knauff (April 27, 1938 – February 21, 2024) was an American writer, glider pilot, flight instructor, former Federal Aviation Administration (FAA) Designated Pilot Examiner, and a member of the U.S. Soaring Hall of Fame. He was an early pioneer of ridge soaring in the Ridge-and-valley Appalachians in the 1960s, ultimately setting five world records flying gliders there. He was the stunt pilot in the 1999 film The Thomas Crown Affair.

Knauff was the first glider pilot to fly 750 km and 1000 km triangle course flights in the United States, and was the first to fly 1000 km with a passenger. His 1,647 km (1,023 mi) out-and-return flight in 1983 was the world's longest glider flight at the time, stood as a world record for nearly 20 years, and is still a U.S. national record. He has set more than 50 other U.S. National soaring records.

His glider flight training manuals, Glider Basics from First Flight to Solo and Glider Basics from Solo to License are his most popular in the U.S., and he remains a respected glider flight instructors in the world despite his death in February 2024. Knauff was one of the few FAA designated pilot examiners authorized to issue initial flight instructor certificates.

Knauff lived near State College, Pennsylvania with his wife Doris Grove, another hall of fame glider pilot. They owned and operated the Ridge Soaring Gliderport in Julian, Pennsylvania which they founded in 1975 (closed 2022). Knauff died on February 21, 2024, at the age of 85.

== World glider records ==
Knauff has set the following records:

- Single-place glider
  - Out-and-return distance: 1,646.68 kilometres (1,023.20 mi), 25 April 1983, Schempp-Hirth Nimbus 3
  - Distance over a triangular course: 1,362.68 kilometres (846.73 mi), 2 May 1986, Schempp-Hirth Nimbus 3
  - Free distance using up to 3 turn points: 1,394.04 kilometres (866.22 mi), 1 June 1993, Schempp-Hirth Discus B
- Two-place glider
  - Out-and-return distance: 829.7 kilometres (515.6 mi), 7 April 1979, IAR IS-28B2 "Lark"
  - Out-and-return distance: 1,000.88 kilometres (621.92 mi), 28 September 1981, Grob Twin Astir II

== Other flying accomplishments ==
Knauff's other accomplishments include:

- Over 50 U.S. national gliding records
- World/National gliding competitions
- Kronfeld Challenge Cup 1991 (First American)
- Eaton Trophy (with Doris Grove) 2000
- du Pont Trophy 1989
- Stroukoff Trophy 1989
- SSA Exceptional Achievement Award 1986
- FAI 1000K Diploma #15 (Int #31) 1980

== Books ==
Knauff has written the following books:

- Accident Prevention Manual for Glider Flight Instructors, with Doris Grove, 2nd edition, 1993, (No ISBN)
- Accident Prevention Manual for Glider Pilots, with Doris Grove, 1992.
- After Solo, 1995, ISBN 99967-728-9-6
- Cockpit Guide for Glider CFI's
- Glider Basics from First Flight to Solo, 5th edition, 1993, ISBN 0-9605676-3-1
- Glider Basics from Solo to License [edited by Allan Northcut and Norm Gilmore; drawings by Robert Fitch]. 1st ed, 1984. ISBN 0-9605676-2-3
- Glider Emergency Procedures
- Glider Flight Instructor Manual, 2001
- Judgment Training Manual for Glider Pilots, with Doris Grove, 1985. OCLC 61776977
- Judgment training manual for glider flight instructors, 1986. OCLC 61776976
- Off Field Landings, 1993
- Ridge Soaring the Bald Eagle Ridge, 1987
- The Bronze Badge Book
- Transition to Gliders : A Flight Training Handbook for Power Pilots .2nd ed., 1990, 1984, ISBN 0-9605676-2-3
