= Ridge Soaring Gliderport =

Airport in Pennsylvania, United States

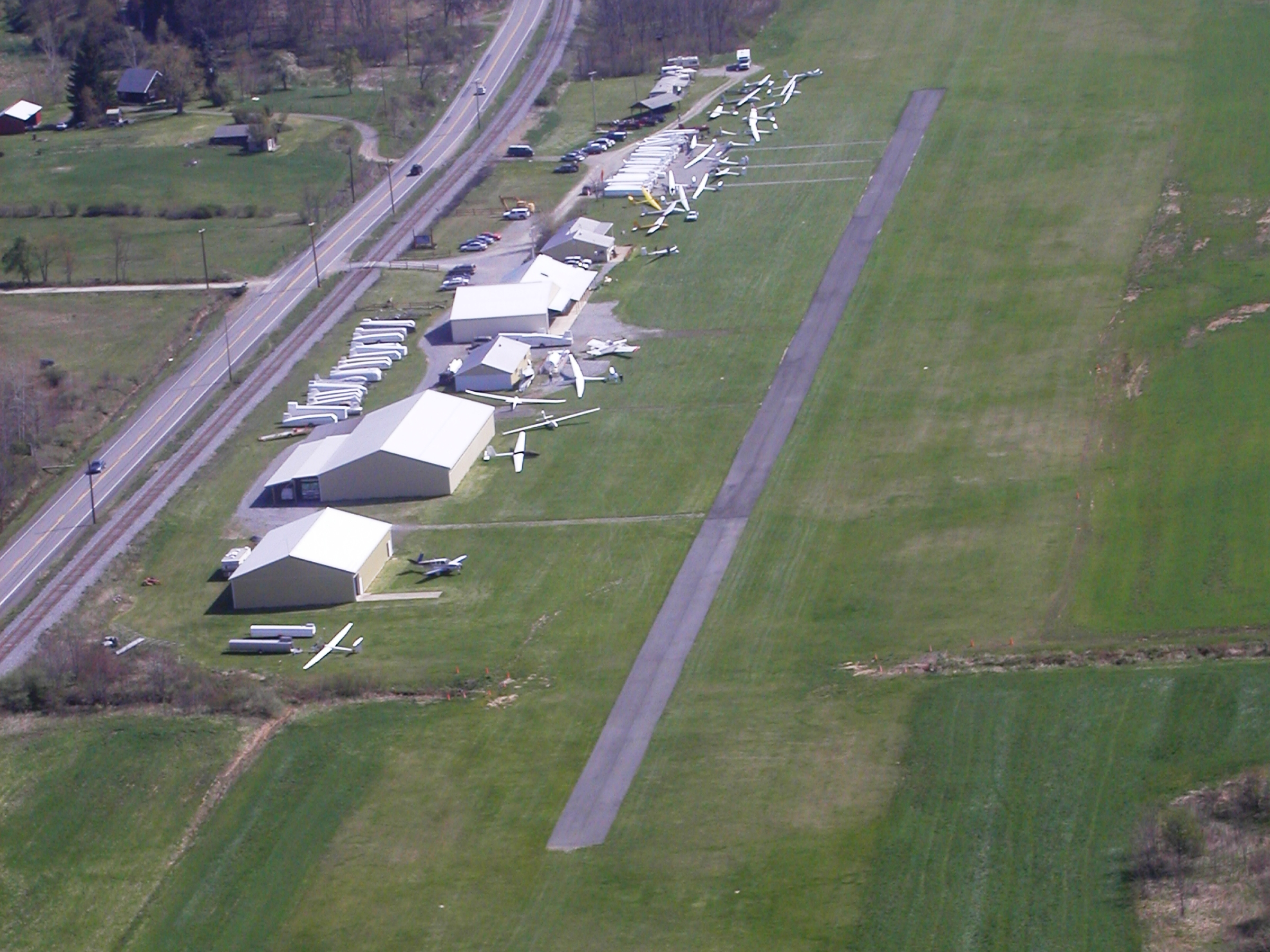
- IATA: none; ICAO: none; FAA LID: 79N

Summary
- Airport type: Public
- Owner: Knauff & Grove, Inc
- Serves: Unionville, Centre County, Pennsylvania
- Location: Julian, Pennsylvania
- Elevation AMSL: 815 ft (248 m)
- Coordinates: 40°53′02″N 077°54′26″W
- Interactive map of Ridge Soaring Gliderport

Runways
Direction	Length		Surface
Direction	ft	m	Surface
7/25	3,322	1,013	Asphalt/Turf

Statistics (2006)
- Aircraft operations: 18,000
- Based aircraft: 34
- Source: Federal Aviation Administration

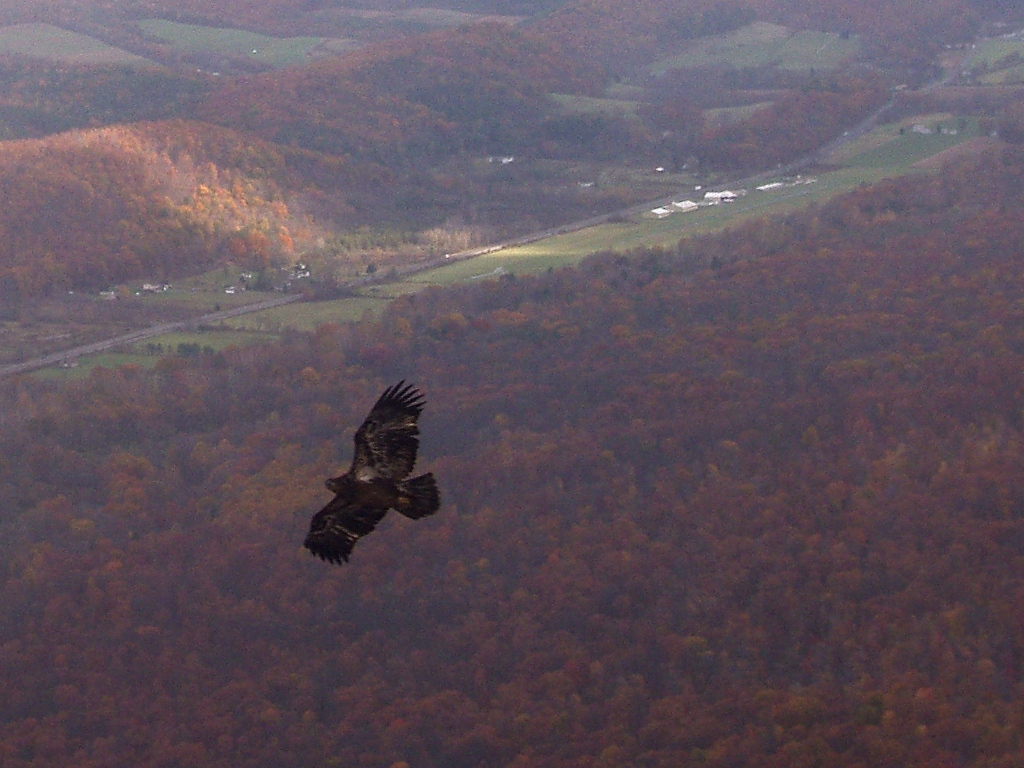
An immature bald eagle thermals over the Ridge Soaring Gliderport in a lake effect rain shower during the fall migration.

Ridge Soaring Gliderport (FAA LID: 79N) was a public-use glider airport located two nautical miles (4 km) southwest of the central business district of Unionville, in Centre County, Pennsylvania, United States. It was privately owned by Knauff & Grove, Inc.

This FBO airport was world-famous for ridge, thermal and wave soaring. It was located on U.S. Route 220 (alternate) 8 miles south of Interstate 80, between Unionville and Julian, at the base of the Bald Eagle Mountain ridge. It was approximately 10 miles from State College and approximately midway between Altoona and Lock Haven in the Bald Eagle Valley. Visitors could look at an entire wall of U.S. National and World records that have been set from this airfield.

== Facilities and aircraft ==
Ridge Soaring Gliderport covered an area of 90 acres (36 ha) at an elevation of 815 feet (248 m) above mean sea level. It had one runway designated 7/25 with a 3,322 x 150 ft (1,013 x 46 m) asphalt and turf surface.

For the 12-month period ending June 30, 2006, the airport had 18,000 general aviation aircraft operations, an average of 49 per day. At that time there were 34 aircraft based at this airport: 88% glider and 12% single-engine.

At the airport there was a bunkhouse with showers, small kitchen, pilots lounge, motorhome facilities, aircraft hangars and protected storage for glider trailers.

A repair shop with an A&P mechanic and inspector was also on the field.

== Airport facts ==
- Portions of the 1999 movie The Thomas Crown Affair were filmed here.
- Co-owner Thomas L. Knauff set five FAI world records, and over 50 NAA national records flying from this airport.
- Co-owner Doris Grove set three FAI feminine world records flying from this airport, and was the first woman to fly a glider more than 1000 km.
- The Glider Port closed in 2022

== See also ==
- List of airports in Pennsylvania
