= Hit! =

1973 film by Sidney J. Furie

- Original film poster
- Directed by: Sidney J. Furie
- Written by: Alan Trustman; David M. Wolf
- Produced by: Harry Korshak
- Starring: Billy Dee Williams; Richard Pryor
- Cinematography: John A. Alonzo
- Music by: Lalo Schifrin
- Production company: Furie-Sentinel-Harkor
- Distributed by: Paramount Pictures
- Release date: September 18, 1973 (New York City)
- Running time: 134 minutes
- Country: United States
- Language: English
- Budget: $1.6 million

Hit! (also released as Goodbye Marseilles) is a 1973 American action thriller film directed by Sidney J. Furie and starring Billy Dee Williams and Richard Pryor. Williams portrays a US federal agent trying to destroy a narcotics ring after his daughter dies from a heroin overdose.

== Plot ==
In Marseille, a man and his girlfriend board a yacht. He retrieves a bundle of opium attached to a sea buoy and delivers it to a man in a chateau who processes the opium into heroin. The chateau man transfers the processed heroin to the ringleader who takes it to the docks and hides the drugs inside bicycle frames designated for transport to the U.S. Meanwhile, in Washington, D.C., teenager Jeannie Allen gets picked up for school by her boyfriend. After school, Jeannie’s boyfriend buys some heroin and injects Jeannie with it. She has a fatal overdose.

Jeannie's father Nick Allen is a federal narcotics agent. Determined to avenge his daughter's death, he tracks down the dealer who sold the heroin and nearly beats him until the dealer convinces Nick that the real villains are the ones supplying him. Nick's director offers his condolences over Jeannie’s death and suggests an easy assignment to get Nick’s mind off the tragedy. Nick suggests instead going after the head of the heroin ring. Nick’s supervisor wants nothing to do with the conversation and washes his hands of Nick.

Nick assembles a team of outcasts by pressuring each in different ways. Dutch Schiller is an agent near retirement and frustrated that his violent tactics get drug pushers released back onto the streets. Nick convinces him to go to France and reconnoiter on the drug cartel. Nick offers an addict prostitute, Sherry Nielson, a daily supply of dope. He also enlists Barry Strong, a former military sniper by pressuring him on his unpaid taxes. Mike Willmer is a former Navy sailor whose wife was raped and killed by a junkie. Elderly Ida & Herman have mysterious backgrounds in clandestine operations and they had a son who died from drug addiction.

Nick's director agency sends two assassins, Carlin and Crosby, to kill Nick, but he escapes and hurries his team to a hideout in British Columbia. Dutch presents all the intelligence he’s gathered on the heroin operation and identifies nine targets, claiming that the cartel will collapse if they are killed. The team trains for a week before heading to Marseille where they carry out their operation.

Herman kills his target with a shotgun in a movie theater as the man watches The Godfather. Ida stabs hers in the bathroom at a restaurant. Mike shoots the yachtsman with a speargun as he tries to retrieve another package of opium. Barry and Dutch drive straight onto the grounds of the chateau and shoot the opium processor. Sherry poses as a waitress and poisons another leader of the ring. Sherry, in practice runs, initially has problems committing this crime in the crucial allotted time, primarily because she's in heat. Mike convinces Nick to sleep with Sherry to tinge her hormones and she then commits the murder successfully. Barry and Sherry go to a fashion house and assassinate two other ringleaders there. Meanwhile, Nick poses as a gas serviceman digging a new trench for a pipe at the mansion. He kills his target with a bazooka.

The Director confronts Nick after the operation is complete and offers a solution to coverup what happened, claiming the French are furious at the U.S. Nick sees through the ruse and says that the Director is furious because Nick showed how easy it was to destroy the cartel with a ragtag team. The Director threatens to have Nick killed. Nick smiles and leaves.

== Cast ==
- Billy Dee Williams as Nick Allen
- Richard Pryor as Mike Willmer
- Paul Hampton as Barry Strong
- Gwen Welles as Sherry Nielson
- Warren J. Kemmerling as "Dutch" Schiller
- Janet Brandt as Ida
- Sid Melton as Herman
- Zooey Hall as Carlin
- Todd Martin as Crosby
- Norman Burton as The Director
- Jenny Astruc as Mademoiselle Frelou
- Yves Barsacq as Romain
- Jean-Claude Bercq as Jean-Baptiste
- Henri Cogan as Bornou
- Pierre Collet as "Zero"
- Tina Andrews as Jeannie Allen

== Production ==
Several of the cast and crew had previously worked on Lady Sings the Blues (1972).

Filming began in late November 1972. Shooting took place at various locations in Los Angeles, Washington state, Marseille, Chicago and British Columbia.

The F/V Victory, which Richard Pryor is seen piloting, was supposed to be blown up, with money being offered to owner Donald Gillich (who actually steered the boat from the pilot house below) for a replacement. Gillich however shot the producers down, saying he didn't want his family's boat destroyed.

The role of Nick Allen was originally written for Steve McQueen.

== Reception ==
Vincent Canby of The New York Times wrote, "It's a movie out for kicks, but the kicks are so implausible, so humorless, so without redeeming style and wit, that to sit through it is to give oneself a false low." Variety faulted the film for "illogical plotting" and a too-long running time that "allows for some tedium," but praised "a charismatic dimension to Williams' leading performance, some tautly edited and dramatically photographed action setpieces and some nifty comic business deftly handled by Furie," as well a "consistently excellent supporting cast." Gene Siskel of the Chicago Tribune gave the film three stars out of four, writing that it "isn't going to win any prizes for originality," but nevertheless provides "solid entertainment and should be a box office smash." Charles Champlin of the Los Angeles Times wrote that "at the level of calculated make-believe it was seeking, the movie succeeds extremely well. It is a big, long (two hours and a quarter), richly glossy international crime adventure, a generally suspenseful piece of storytelling centering on the strong and sympathetic performance of Billy Dee Williams in the lead role."

== Home media ==
Hit! was released to DVD and Blu-Ray by Olive Films (under license from Paramount Pictures) on April 24, 2012.

== See also ==
- List of American films of 1973
