= Unionville Historic District =

Historic district in Pennsylvania, United States

- U.S. National Register of Historic Places
- U.S. Historic district
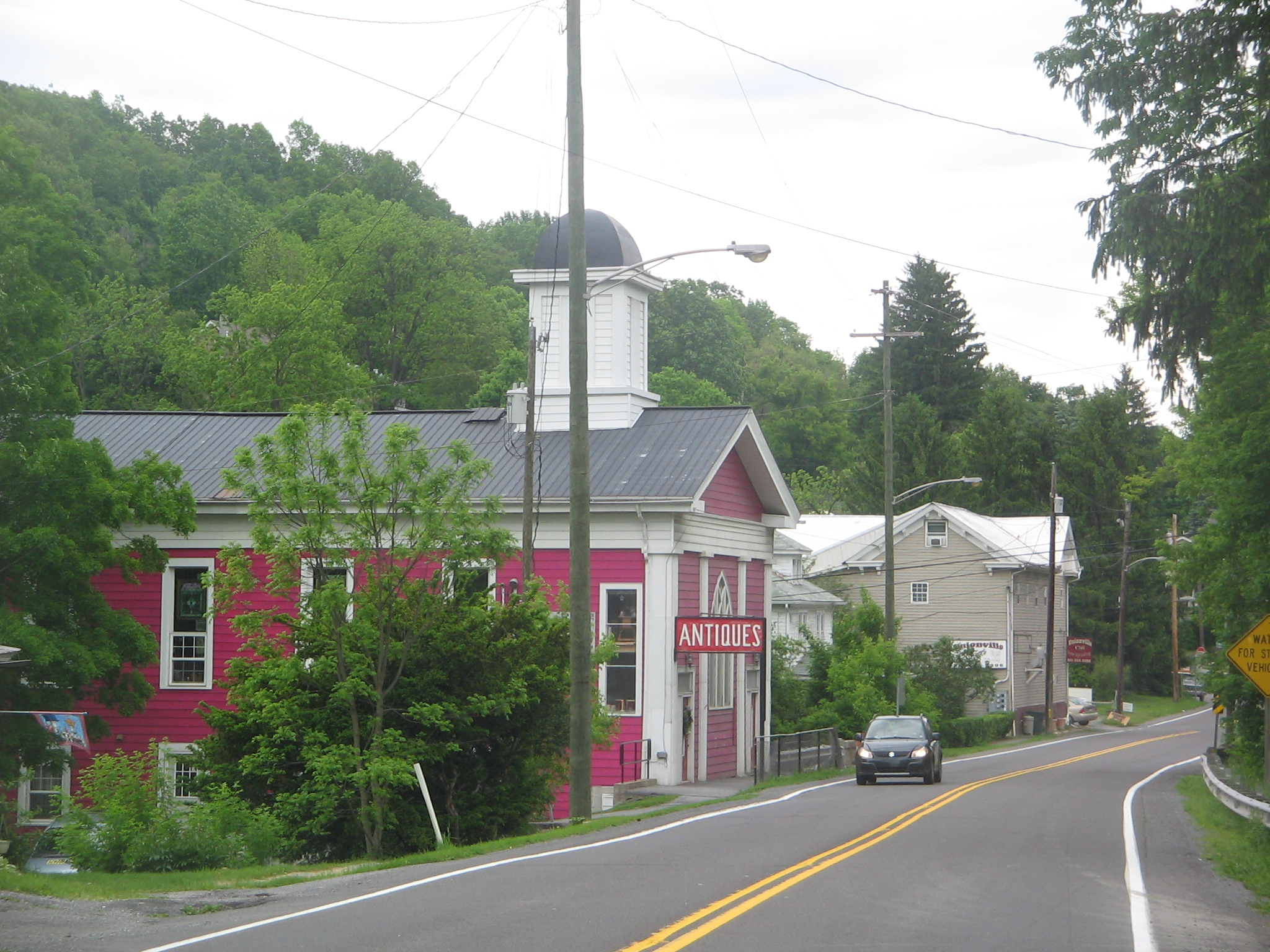
- Unionville Historic District, May 2010

- Location within Pennsylvania Location within the United States
- Location: U.S. Route 220 and Pennsylvania Route 504, Unionville, Pennsylvania
- Coordinates: 40°54′22″N 77°52′34″W
- Area: 120 acres (49 ha)
- Built: 1848
- Architectural style: Mid 19th Century Revival, Italianate, Georgian
- NRHP reference No.: 79002194
- Added to NRHP: May 30, 1979

The Unionville Historic District is a national historic district that is located in Unionville, Centre County, Pennsylvania.

It was added to the National Register of Historic Places in 1979.

== History and architectural features ==
This district includes 173 contributing buildings and three contributing sites that are located in the central business district and surrounding residential area of Unionville. The buildings are primarily residential and date as early as 1848 and include a number of "I"-plan houses and other vernacular or folk house types. Notable non-residential buildings include the Moses-Taylor Tavern, the Peters Temperance House, the Union Church, the Methodist Church (c. 1860), the Griest Store, and the Union Grange Hall.

== Gallery ==
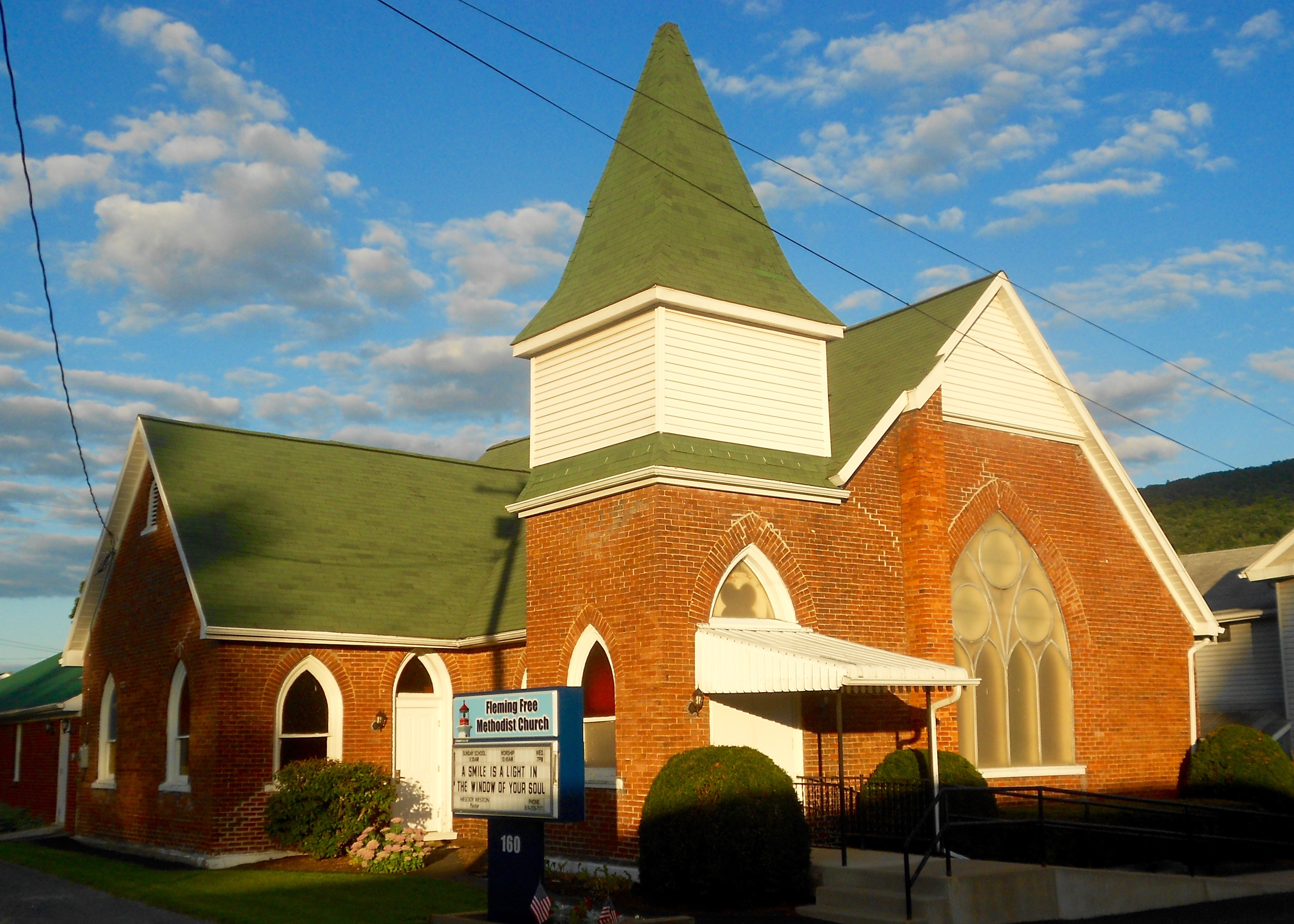
Fleming Free Methodist Church
