= Fisher Farm site =

Archaeological type site in Pennsylvania, United States of America

- Fisher Farm Site
- U.S. National Register of Historic Places
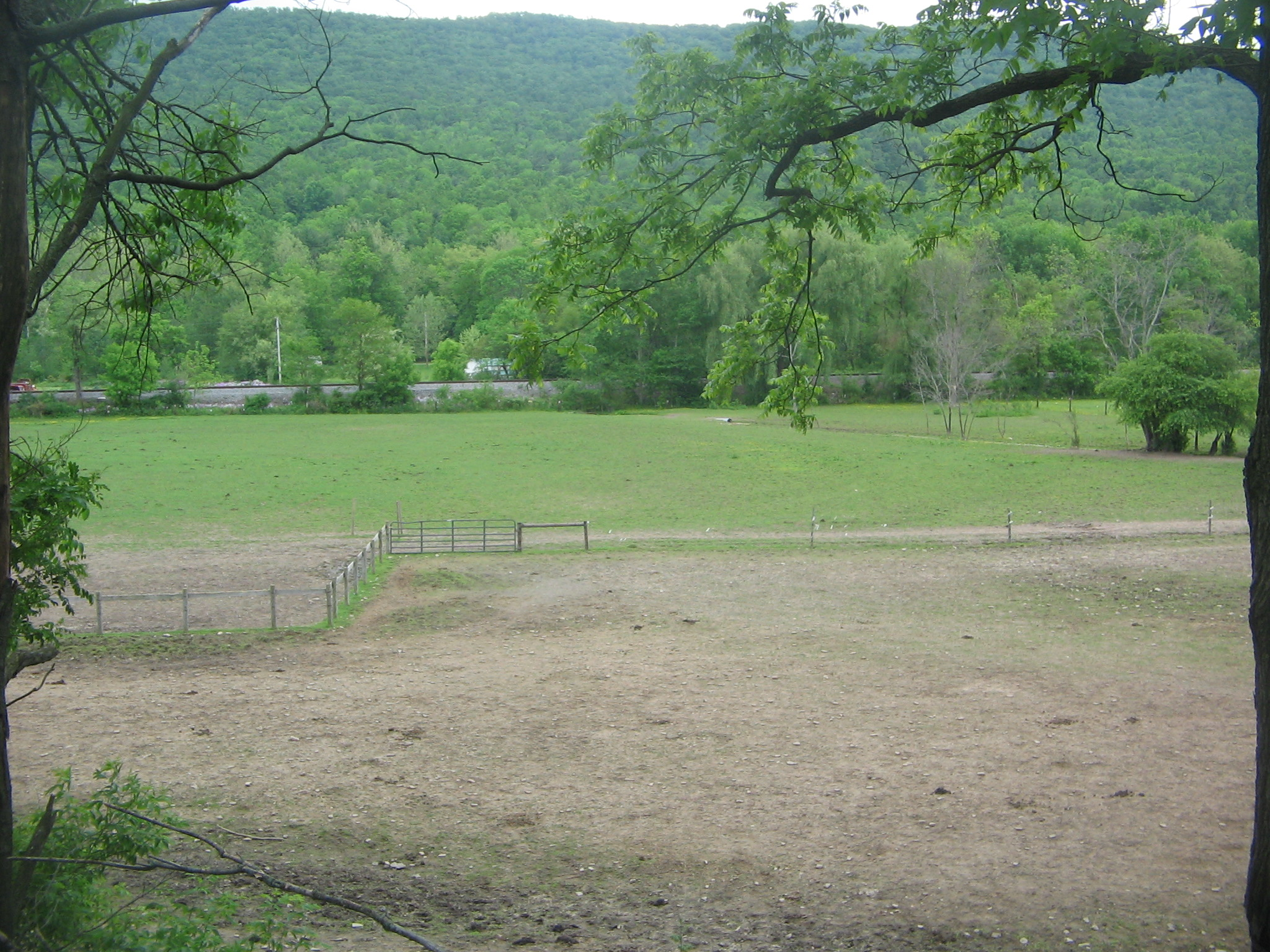
- The site is a farm today

- Location within Pennsylvania Location within the United States
- Location: Along U.S. Route 220, straddling a rail line
- Nearest city: Unionville
- Coordinates: 40°54′15.6″N 77°52′40″W
- Area: 3.5 acres (1.4 ha)
- Built: 1200
- NRHP reference No.: 82003781
- Added to NRHP: March 3, 1982

The Fisher Farm Site is an archaeological site in Centre County, Pennsylvania, United States. Located in fields on the outskirts of Unionville, it is one of central Pennsylvania's leading archaeological sites.

== Profile ==
The Fisher Farm Site encompasses approximately 3.5 acres (1.4 ha) on the northern bank of Bald Eagle Creek. While the site primarily includes farm fields, the site is divided into two sections by a railroad line, and a former streambed is located amid the fields. west of central Unionville Farmers have plowed the fields west of central Unionville since at least the 1870s, but the area was farmed before European settlement. Investigations at the site have led archaeologists to conclude that the site is that of a Late Woodland farming village that was occupied between AD 1200 and 1600.

== Excavations ==
Archaeological excavations of the Fisher Farm Site commenced in 1976 and continued through 1978. Based on the tests conducted in 1976, the large-scale excavations of 1977 and 1978 resulted in the removal of hundreds of square meters of field and former streambed above Bald Eagle Creek. Among the artifacts recovered in 1977 were nine burials and sixty-three other items of interest, while the 1978 excavation yielded pollen and carbon-14 samples useful for dating and reconstructing the profile of the site respectively. The site was named for its owner, Ivan Fisher.

== Conclusions ==
The Fisher Farm Site has been crucial to the understanding of Late Woodland archaeology in central Pennsylvania. Before excavations at Fisher Farm, research at Late Woodland villages in the region had been conducted at stockaded villages along rivers; sites such as Fisher Farm, which was smaller than the fortified villages and located along a less significant waterway, had been little studied. It has been suggested that these small villages were politically connected to the larger communities, although whether individuals would migrate between large and small villages is disputed. Much of the cultural evidence at the site is derived from pottery recovered in 1978 from the former streambed. While previous models had held that different styles of pottery replaced one another in a sudden fashion, the development of designs seen at Fisher Farm seems to indicate a more gradual transition from style to style. Finally, the Fisher Farm Site was the first of many villages to be excavated in the Nittany Valley; as such, it has become somewhat of a type site in the region. Findings at the site have led to the proposal of a new model of Late Woodland culture in the region.

== Recognition ==
In 1982, the Fisher Farm Site was placed on the National Register of Historic Places for its place as a significant archaeological site.

== See also ==
- List of Native American archaeological sites on the National Register of Historic Places in Pennsylvania
