= Alan Trustman =

American lawyer and screenwriter (1930–2026)

- Born: December 16, 1930; Brookline, Massachusetts, U.S.
- Died: February 5, 2026 (aged 95); Miami, Florida, U.S.
- Occupation: Screenwriter
- Known for: The Thomas Crown Affair; Bullitt; They Call Me Mister Tibbs!

Alan Robert Trustman (December 16, 1930 – February 5, 2026) was an American lawyer, screenwriter, pari-mutuel operator and currency trader. He is best known for writing the 1968 film, The Thomas Crown Affair, Bullitt, and They Call Me Mister Tibbs!, in his film career.

== Early life and education ==
Trustman was born in Brookline, Massachusetts, on December 16, 1930. He attended the Boston Latin School, then The Phillips Exeter Academy where he was first in his 1948 class, and then graduated magna cum laude from Harvard College in 1952 and Harvard Law School in 1955.

After college, he was admitted to the Massachusetts Bar and went to work at the Boston law firm Nutter McClennen & Fish LLP where his father, Benjamin A. Trustman, was also a partner. He developed shopping centers and bought and sold businesses in competition with the major New York law firms. Gus Alexander, a partner at the firm, best remembers him for achieving partnership in only six years and then retiring on full pension only six years after that at the age of 37.

== Film career ==
In 1967, Trustman wrote his first screenplay, The Thomas Crown Affair. His law office overlooked the First National Bank of Boston, where he had worked during the summer of 1954, and his knowledge of the bank procedures led to the movie about a millionaire businessman who commits a perfect crime, a robbery by five men who do not know each other and never meet until the robbery, in which each has a separate role. Insurance adjuster Faye Dunaway figures out who is responsible for the crime but falls in love with the miscreant. The initial screenplay took 30 days to write. Trustman had written the script for Sean Connery but producer Walter Mirisch and director Norman Jewison cast Steve McQueen, who had been pursuing the role, the first in which he plays against his usual blue-collar man of action persona. Trustman felt the script had to be rewritten for McQueen and spent a week of 16-hour days at United Artists in New York screening film on McQueen and making lists of what McQueen liked, didn't like, did well, and could not do. McQueen loved the rewrite, and according to Trustman, said, "I don't know how that son of a bitch knows me, but he knows me." The movie was Faye Dunaway's favorite.

The success of The Thomas Crown Affair was followed by another McQueen movie, Bullitt, which Trustman wrote in 20 hours. It grossed a then impressive $62 million. In 2004, The New York Times placed the film on its list of The Best 1,000 Movies Ever Made.

Both Thomas Crown and Bullitt have iconic scenes, Thomas Crown the erotic chess game between McQueen and Dunaway culminating in one of moviedom's longest kisses. Critic Penelope Gilliatt described it as "two goldfish going after the same crumb", and the scene has since been parodied in numerous films, the most famous being Peter Sellers's seduction of Shirley MacLaine in Being There (1979) while the two characters watch the film on television. Bullitt has the often copied car chase through the San Francisco hills.

He also wrote They Call Me Mister Tibbs! (1970), Lady Ice (1973) and Hit! (1973).

Trustman left the movie business after four years when he refused to write McQueen's racing car picture, Le Mans, because McQueen insisted the hero had to be a loser. After the argument, he was no longer known as Steve McQueen's writer and, as he puts it, "the phone stopped ringing."

He worked on the scripts for Crime and Passion (1976) and The Next Man (1976). In 1987, he wrote a script for Bullit 2 but it was not made. In 1992, his novel Father's Day was published.

Later on he wrote an episode of Fallen Angels based on a story by Raymond Chandler. He was executive producer on The Tracker (1988). Roger Corman was going to make a film based on a Trustman script called Our Man Ho in 1999, but it was never made.

At the 2013 Cannes Film Festival, Trustman was honored for his part in film history at the annual "For the Love of Cinema" awards dinner. "Alan has made his name with intelligent, subtly ironic dialogues and with the complexity of his scripts", said Georges Kern, IWC Schaffhausen’s CEO, introducing Trustman.

== Later career ==
In 1974, Trustman became an officer, executive committee member and director of World Jai-Alai, which became in four years a public company operating pari-mutuel facilities in Miami, Tampa, Ft. Pierce and Ocala, Florida, and Hartford, Connecticut.

He left in 1978 and spent most of his time afterwards trading currencies and precious metals out of Geneva.

== Personal life and death ==
In 2008 he married a therapist named Dr. Barbara Buchwald. They lived on Fisher Island, Florida. Previously Trustman was married to Playboy magazine cartoon editor Michelle Urry.

Trustman died at a Miami nursing home on February 5, 2026, at the age of 95.

== Filmography ==
| Year | Title | Writer | Producer | Ref. |
|---|---|---|---|---|
| 1968 | The Thomas Crown Affair | Yes | No | |
| 1968 | Bullitt | Yes | No | |
| 1970 | They Call Me Mister Tibbs! | Yes | No | |
| 1973 | Lady Ice | Yes | No | |
| 1973 | Hit! | Yes | No | |
| 1975 | Crime and Passion | Uncredited | No | |
| 1976 | The Next Man | Yes | No | |
| 1988 | The Tracker | No | Executive | Television film |
| 1995 | Fallen Angels | Yes | No | Episode: "Red Wind" (Unreleased) |
| 1999 | The Thomas Crown Affair | Story | No | |
| 2027 | The Thomas Crown Affair | Story | Executive | Upcoming posthumous release |

As a actor

| Year | Film | Role | Notes |
|---|---|---|---|
| 2015 | Steve McQueen: The Man & Le Mans | Himself | Documentary |
