= The Thomas Crown Affair (2027 film) =

Upcoming film by Michael B. Jordan

- Teaser poster
- Directed by: Michael B. Jordan
- Screenplay by: Drew Pearce; Jason Hall; Leslie Dixon; Kurt Wimmer
- Story by: Alan R. Trustman; Drew Pearce
- Based on: The Thomas Crown Affair by Alan R. Trustman
- Produced by: Michael B. Jordan; Patrick McCormick; Scott Stuber; Marc Toberoff; Charles Roven
- Starring: Michael B. Jordan; Kenneth Branagh; Adria Arjona; Lily Gladstone; Danai Gurira; Pilou Asbæk
- Cinematography: Bradford Young
- Music by: Joseph Shirley
- Production companies: Metro-Goldwyn-Mayer; Outlier Society; Atlas Entertainment; Toberoff Productions
- Distributed by: Amazon MGM Studios (France/United States); Sony Pictures Releasing International (International)
- Release date: March 5, 2027
- Country: United States
- Language: English

The Thomas Crown Affair is an upcoming American romantic heist action film directed by Michael B. Jordan and written by Drew Pearce and Jason Hall, with Leslie Dixon and Kurt Wimmer also receiving screenwriting credit. It is a second remake of the 1968 film, following its 1999 remake with Pierce Brosnan. The film stars Jordan, Kenneth Branagh, Adria Arjona, Lily Gladstone, Danai Gurira, and Pilou Asbæk.

The Thomas Crown Affair is scheduled to be released in the United States by Amazon MGM Studios on March 5, 2027.

== Premise ==
Thomas Crown is a billionaire who cleverly steals a painting while another heist fails. Followed by an insurance investigator, the two fall in love during the cat and mouse game.

== Cast ==
- Michael B. Jordan as Thomas Crown
- Adria Arjona as Bennet
- Kenneth Branagh
- Lily Gladstone
- Danai Gurira
- Pilou Asbæk
- Aiysha Hart

== Production ==
In February 2016, Michael B. Jordan approached Metro-Goldwyn-Mayer to pitch a new adaptation of The Thomas Crown Affair (1968) with hopes of starring in the lead role. In April 2019, it was reported that Anthony Russo and Joe Russo would produce an adaptation of The Thomas Crown Affair with their production company AGBO. In April 2023, after having acquired MGM, Amazon announced plans to reboot the franchise, with a new feature film in development through the company's Amazon Studios, later rebranded as Amazon MGM Studios. In September 2024, it was announced that Jordan would direct and produce, with Drew Pearce writing the script, based on a previous draft by Wes Tooke and Justin Britt-Gibson.

In March 2025, Taylor Russell was cast as the co-lead. In July, Kenneth Branagh, Lily Gladstone, Danai Gurira, Pilou Asbæk, and Aiysha Hart were added to the cast, with Charles Roven and his Atlas Entertainment banner joining the production. During filming, Russell left the project due to creative differences. Russell was replaced by Adria Arjona. In November 2025, Aubrey Plaza, Paapa Essiedu, and Ruth Negga were listed as part of the cast, but it was later stated that it was incorrectly reported.

Principal photography began on July 7, 2025, at Elstree Studios in England. Filming wrapped in November 2025.

== Music ==
In April 2026, it was announced that Jon Batiste would compose the score. In November 2026, Joseph Shirley was revealed to have replaced Batiste as composer. Shirley and Jordan previously worked together on Creed III.

== Release ==
The Thomas Crown Affair is scheduled to be released in the United States on March 5, 2027, in IMAX.
