= The Thomas Crown Affair (1999 film) =

- Theatrical release poster
- Directed by: John McTiernan
- Screenplay by: Leslie Dixon; Kurt Wimmer
- Based on: The Thomas Crown Affair by Alan Trustman
- Produced by: Pierce Brosnan; Beau St. Clair
- Starring: Pierce Brosnan; Rene Russo; Denis Leary
- Cinematography: Tom Priestley Jr.
- Edited by: John Wright
- Music by: Bill Conti
- Production companies: United Artists; Irish DreamTime
- Distributed by: MGM Distribution Co. (United States/Canada); United International Pictures (International)
- Release date: August 6, 1999
- Running time: 113 minutes
- Country: United States
- Language: English
- Budget: $48 million
- Box office: $125.3 million

The Thomas Crown Affair is a 1999 American romantic heist film directed by John McTiernan and written by Leslie Dixon and Kurt Wimmer. It is a remake of the 1968 film of the same title. Starring Pierce Brosnan, Rene Russo, and Denis Leary, it follows Thomas Crown, a bored billionaire who steals a painting from the Metropolitan Museum of Art and is pursued by an insurance investigator, with the two falling in love.

Produced by United Artists and Irish DreamTime, the film was released on August 6, 1999. It grossed $125.3 million worldwide, against a budget of $48 million, and received generally positive reviews from critics.

== Plot ==
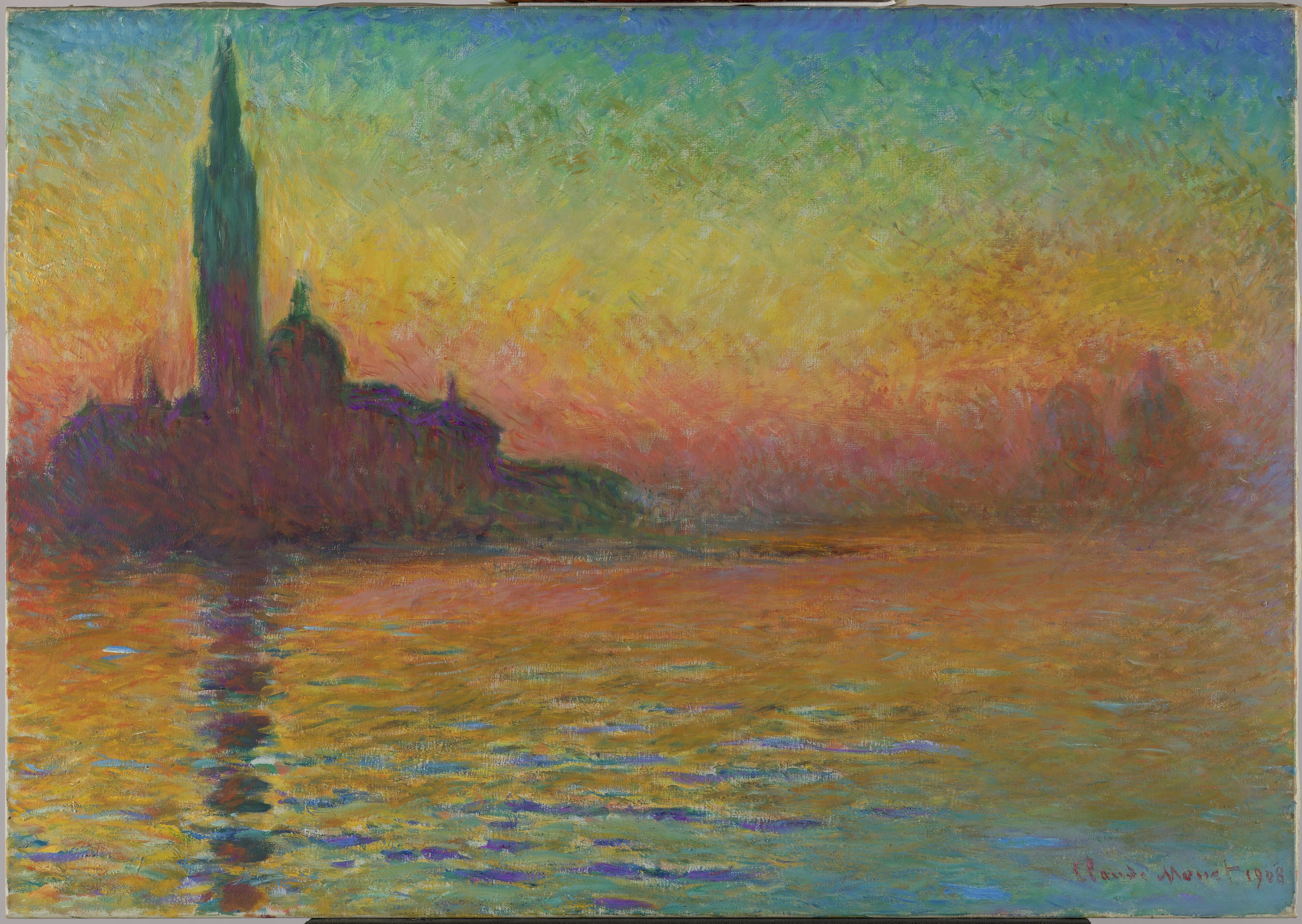
San Giorgio Maggiore at Dusk (1908), the Claude Monet painting stolen in the film

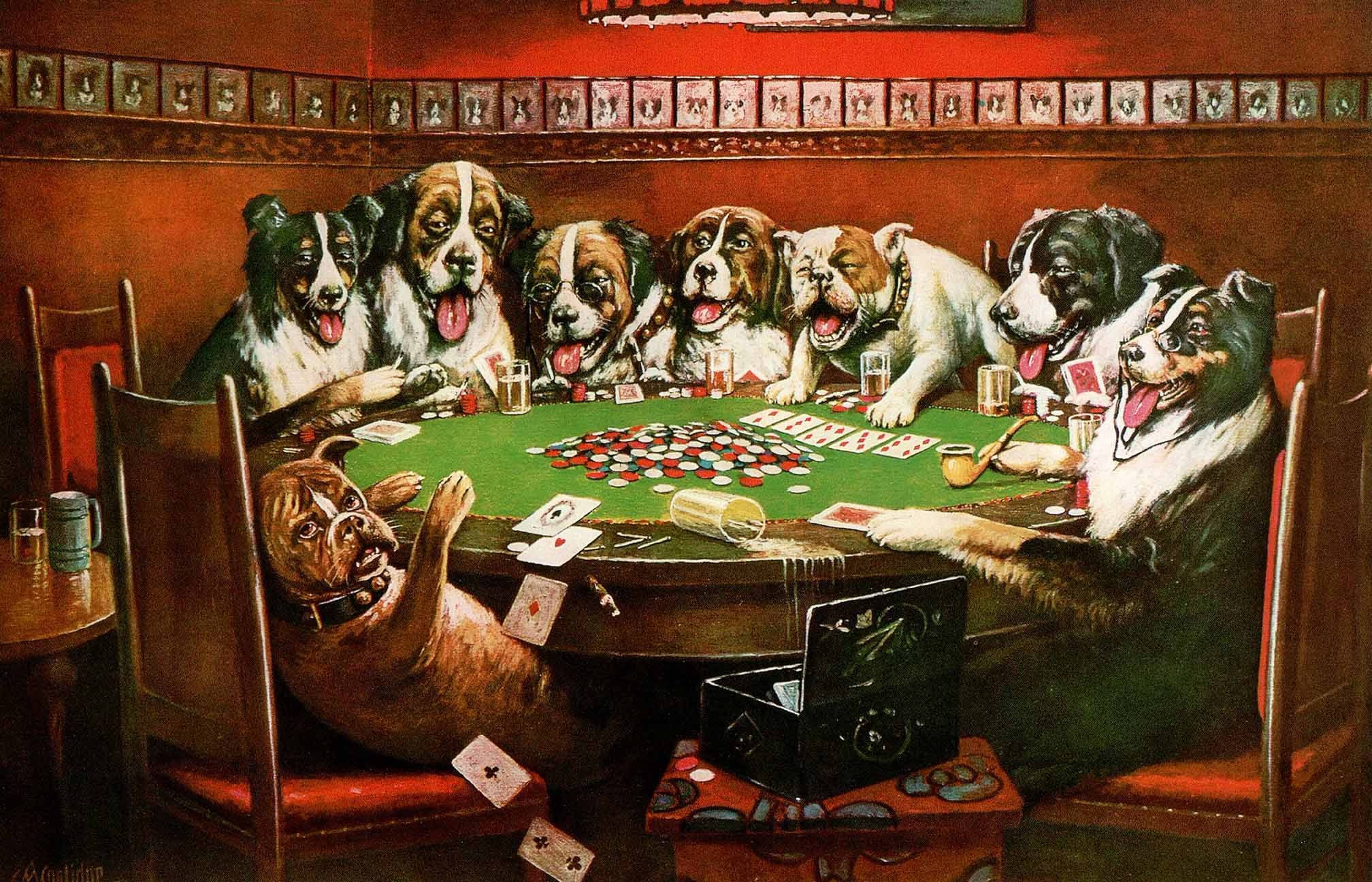
A close copy of Poker Sympathy from Cassius Marcellus Coolidge's Dogs Playing Poker series is used as a plot point in the film.

Thieves infiltrate the Metropolitan Museum of Art inside an actual Trojan horse, preparing to steal an entire gallery of paintings, but are apprehended. In the confusion, billionaire Thomas Crown – the crime's secret mastermind – steals Claude Monet's painting of San Giorgio Maggiore at Dusk. NYPD Detective Michael McCann heads the investigation into the theft of the $100 million artwork, with the unwelcome assistance of insurance investigator Catherine Banning.

Crown lends a Camille Pissarro to fill the Monet's space in the museum and falls under Banning's suspicion. She persuades McCann to begin surveillance of Crown, deducing that he is motivated not by money but by the sheer thrill of the crime. Banning later accepts Crown's invitation to dinner.

At dinner, Banning has a copy of Crown's keys made; she and her team search his home and discover the Monet, which is revealed to be a taunting imitation painted over a copy of Poker Sympathy from the Dogs Playing Poker series. Banning confronts Crown, and the two give in to their mutual attraction and have passionate sex.

Banning and Crown continue their cat-and-mouse game and their trysts, despite McCann's surveillance. Accompanying Crown on a trip to Martinique, Banning realizes he is preparing to run but rejects his offer to join him when the time comes. McCann presents Banning with photographs of Crown with another woman, Anna, complicating her feelings toward the case and her prime suspect. Banning and McCann discover that the fake Monet is in fact an expert forgery that could only have been painted by someone with access to the original; they visit the likeliest forger, Heinrich Knutzhorn, in prison, to no avail, although his body language suggests to them that he recognizes the work.

Later, Banning finds Crown packing his belongings with Anna. He promises Banning his interest lies with her alone, stating that Anna works for him but he would be compromising her to define the nature of their association. Crown offers to return the Monet by putting it back on the wall of the museum, and gives Banning a time and place to meet him when he's finished. Tearfully, Banning leaves and informs McCann.

The following day, the police stake out the museum, waiting to arrest Crown. Banning learns from McCann that the fake Monet was painted by Anna; the imprisoned forger Knutzhorn is her father, a former business partner of Crown, who became her guardian. Crown arrives and advertises his position in the lobby. The police realize that Crown expected Banning to turn him in and that he has set up another plot. Before the police can apprehend him, Crown blends into the crowd, aided by lookalikes in bowler hats à la René Magritte's 1964 painting The Son of Man. Evading the officers, Crown releases smoke bombs and pulls a fire alarm, setting off the museum's fire sprinklers. His donated Pissarro, hanging in the Monet's place, is washed clean by the sprinklers to reveal the real Monet.

Crown's game is made clear: upon stealing the Monet, Crown had Anna forge the Pissarro over it and "returned" it to the museum. However, Crown has now vanished with another painting—one that Banning had told him she would have selected over the Monet. With the Monet recovered, Banning considers her role in the case concluded; the second missing painting is not covered by her employer. McCann briefly stops Banning to press her for anything she might know, but admits he has since stopped caring whether or not they catch Crown and bids her farewell. Banning then races to meet Crown at the rendezvous, but finds only a bowler-hatted courier who delivers to her the newly-stolen painting. Devastated, Banning has the painting sent to McCann and boards a flight back to London. In her seat after takeoff, she begins to cry when a hand from the row behind extends to her a handkerchief and offers her comfort. The passenger's thinly disguised voice gives the game away; she turns to find Crown sitting behind her, and the two are reunited.

== Cast ==
- Pierce Brosnan as Thomas Crown
- Rene Russo as Catherine Banning
- Denis Leary as Detective Michael McCann
- Ben Gazzara as Andrew Wallace
- Frankie Faison as Paretti
- Fritz Weaver as John Reynolds
- Charles Keating as Golchan
- Mark Margolis as Knutzhorn
- Faye Dunaway as Psychiatrist
- Esther Cañadas as Anna Knudsen

== Production ==
At first, director John McTiernan was unavailable for the remake of the 1968 film of the same name. Pierce Brosnan and his fellow producers considered several directors (including Mike Newell, Andrew Davis and Roger Donaldson) before returning to their original choice. McTiernan then received the script and added his own ideas to the production.

=== Script amendments ===
After McTiernan signed on to the project, he changed the theme of the central heist and a number of key scenes. McTiernan felt that contemporary audiences would be less forgiving of Thomas Crown if he staged two armed bank robberies for fun as Steve McQueen did in the original, rather than if he staged an unarmed art heist. He wrote the heist based on the Trojan horse theme and on a technical failure of thermal cameras. The polo match in the original film had been rewritten but McTiernan found it cliché, and he wanted a scene that conveyed more action and excitement, so he substituted a catamaran race. Originally, an elaborate 30-page sequence of the theft of the final painting was planned, although McTiernan removed this in favor of a simple mystified response by Denis Leary's character Michael McCann when asked how it was taken.

=== References to 1968 film ===
There are a number of echo references to the original 1968 version of the film. The most obvious is the casting of Faye Dunaway as Crown's psychiatrist; Dunaway portrayed insurance investigator Vicki Anderson in the original. In the remake, "The Windmills of Your Mind" plays during the ballroom scene, as background music in a couple of other scenes, and during the credits at the end; the song earned an Academy Award for Best Original Song for the original film. Both films share a nearly identical scene with Crown playing high-stakes golf, and in both films Crown pilots a glider for recreation.

=== Filming ===
Filming took place in several parts of New York City, including Central Park in 1998. The corporate headquarters of Lucent Technologies stood in for Crown's suite of offices. Due to the impossibility of filming scenes at the Metropolitan Museum of Art (the producers' request was "respectfully declined"), the production crew made their own museum on a soundstage. Artisans were hired to create a realistic look to the set. Another scene was filmed in a different city landmark: the main research library of the New York Public Library.

The glider scenes were shot at Ridge Soaring Gliderport, Eagle Field in Pennsylvania and at Corning-Painted Post Airport in New York. The two glider aero-tow shots were taken from film shot at different airports with different tow planes. The initial takeoff was photographed at the Harris Hill Soaring Center located at the National Soaring Museum in Elmira, New York. The glider pilot was Thomas L. Knauff, a world record holder, and a member of the US Soaring Hall of Fame.

=== Paintings ===
The paintings, copies of which were supplied by "Troubetzkoy Paintings" in New York, appearing in the film are:

- San Giorgio Maggiore at Twilight by Claude Monet, owned by the National Museum and Art Gallery in Cardiff, Wales.
- Wheatstacks by Claude Monet, owned by the Getty Museum in Los Angeles.
- Noon: Rest From Work (After Millet) by Vincent van Gogh – The painting Crown admires and calls "his haystacks," the original is owned by Musée d'Orsay in Paris, France.
- The Artist's Garden at Eragny by Camille Pissarro.
- The Son of Man by René Magritte – The painting that is seen several times in the film depicting a man in a suit with a Bowler hat and an apple covering his face.
- Banks of the Seine at Argenteuil by Édouard Manet – The second painting to go missing, given to, and later returned by, Catherine. It is currently housed at the Courtauld Institute of Art Gallery in London.
- The Intervention of the Sabine Women by Jacques-Louis David, owned by the Louvre in Paris.
- A painting in the style of Cassius Coolidge's series, Dogs Playing Poker is shown but it is not one of Coolidge's works.
- The Caliph of Constantine by the French artist Théodore Chassériau. It is held at the Palace of Versailles.

== Soundtrack ==
The Thomas Crown Affair

Soundtrack album by Bill Conti, Sting and Nina Simone
- Released: September 7, 1999 (original); March 8, 2002 (re-release)
- Recorded: 1999
- Genre: Soundtrack
- Length: 37:44
- Labels: Ark 21 (original); Pangaea (re-release)

Soundtrack
Review scores
Source	Rating
AllMusic	3.5/5 stars

The soundtrack was composed by Bill Conti and arranged by Jack Eskew. It features a variety of jazz arrangements which harken back to the original film's version. In addition, the film ends with a reprise of the Academy Award-winning song "Windmills of Your Mind" sung by Sting. Throughout the film, Nina Simone's recording of "Sinnerman" (from the album Pastel Blues, 1965) is used in segments. Mostly the non-vocal parts are used (hand-clapping and piano riffs), but in the final scenes, where Crown returns to the scene of the crime, Simone sings "Oh sinnerman, where are you gonna run to?"

=== Track listing ===
1. "Windmills of Your Mind" – Sting
2. "Sinnerman" – Nina Simone
3. "Everything (...Is Never Quite Enough)" – Wasis Diop
4. "Caban La Ka Kratchie" – Georges Fordant
5. "Black & White X 5" – Bill Conti
6. "Never Change" – Bill Conti
7. "Meet Ms. Banning" – Bill Conti
8. "Goodnight/Breaking & Entering" – Bill Conti
9. "Glider Pt. 1" – Bill Conti
10. "Glider Pt. 2" – Bill Conti
11. "Cocktails" – Bill Conti
12. "Quick Exit" – Bill Conti

== Release ==
=== Theatrical ===
The Thomas Crown Affair premiered on July 27, 1999, and was theatrically released in the United States on August 6, 1999 by United Artists and Metro-Goldwyn-Mayer.

=== Home media ===
The Thomas Crown Affair was released on VHS and DVD in the LaserDisc format on January 4, 2000 in the United States by MGM Home Entertainment. The DVD includes comments from director John McTiernan. When the film was broadcast on TBS, the Pepsi One logo on the can from which Catherine Banning (Rene Russo) drinks had to be deleted.

== Reception ==
=== Box office ===
The Thomas Crown Affair grossed $69.3 million domestically (United States and Canada) and $55.0 million in other territories, for a worldwide total of $124.3 million, against a budget of $48 million. It peaked at No. 4, in its first week of release, and spent its first seven weeks in the Top 10 at the domestic box office.

=== Critical response ===
On the review aggregator website Rotten Tomatoes, 69% of 102 critics' reviews are positive, with an average rating of 6.4/10. The website's consensus reads: "Sleek, stylish, and painlessly diverting, The Thomas Crown Affair is a remake of uncommon charm." Metacritic, which uses a weighted average, assigned the film a score of 72 out of 100, based on 23 critics, indicating "generally favorable" reviews. Audiences polled by CinemaScore gave the film an average grade of "B+" on an A+ to F scale.

David Edelstein writing for Slate.com felt that this was an unnecessary remake, but gave a positive review: "We didn't need it, but we got it anyway--and it's pretty terrific." He praised the smart overhaul of the script, and the "movie star" performance from Russo. Owen Gleiberman of Entertainment Weekly gave it a B+ grade, praising Tiernan for his light touch direction, and calls it an improvement over the original in several ways. He finds it similar to the film Entrapment and criticizes it for being "built out of spare parts we've seen in countless other films".

=== Accolades ===
Year	Award	Category	Nominee	Result
2000	Blockbuster Entertainment Award	Favourite Actor – Drama/Romance	Pierce Brosnan	Won
2000	Blockbuster Entertainment Award	Favourite Supporting Actor – Drama/Romance	Denis Leary	Won
2000	Blockbuster Entertainment Award	Favourite Actress – Drama/Romance	Rene Russo	Nominated
2000	Hollywood Makeup Artist and Hair Stylist Guild Award	Best Contemporary Hair Styling – Feature	Enzo Angileri	Won
2000	Golden Satellite Award	Best Original Score	Bill Conti	Nominated

== Future ==
In January 2007, it was announced that a sequel would be a loose remake of the 1964 film Topkapi. Pierce Brosnan said in January 2009 that Paul Verhoeven was attached to direct the film. In 2010, Verhoeven said that he had left the project due to script changes and a change in the regime. At one point, both Angelina Jolie and Charlize Theron were rumored for a part in the film, with Brosnan more keen on bringing Theron on board. In April 2013, Brosnan acknowledged the film's status of being in development hell but claimed he would still like to do it. The initial script was penned by John Rogers from a story he had co-written with Harley Peyton while additional material was provided by Nick Meyer, Michael Finch and Karl Gajdusek.

In the April 2014 edition of Empire, two months after completing a one-year prison term on multiple felony convictions, John McTiernan revealed that he had written a script while incarcerated, for a sequel called Thomas Crown and the Missing Lioness.

In 2016, Michael B. Jordan approached Metro-Goldwyn-Mayer to pitch a new adaptation of the story, with hopes of starring in the lead role. By April 2023, after previously acquiring MGM, Amazon announced new plans to reboot the franchise, with a potential feature film in development through the company's Amazon Studios. The Thomas Crown Affair is scheduled to be released in the United States on March 5, 2027.

== See also ==
- Heist film
