= Earl R. Southee =

- Born: 1892; Binghamton, New York
- Died: 1967 (aged 74–75); Athens, Pennsylvania
- Occupation(s): Flying instructor, airport manager, inspector
- Honours: Soaring Hall of Fame

Earl R. Southee (1892, Binghamton, New York – 1967, Athens, Pennsylvania) was an early American aviator.

== Biography ==
As a young man curious about this new field of aviation, he was employed at the Curtiss Flying School at Newport News in or around 1917 as a young mechanic. Curtiss had won a contract from a group in Princeton, New Jersey, to start a flying school for young men in college, but they were short an instructor. Captain Thomas Baldwin, at Newport News, called a meeting with the pilots/instructors, and asked them for suggestions on getting another instructor for Princeton. One of them mentioned that Earl Southee went up with them after he had worked on their planes, had taken the controls and fared well. The manager said to give him some lessons and see how he does. Southee did fine. After he soloed, they sent him to Princeton as chief mechanic and #4 instructor. One of the students he taught there was Elliott White Springs, who became a World War I flying ace in France. They kept in touch for decades.

Southee went to Dayton after the Princeton Flying School folded in 1917. Later, he worked at Kelly Field in San Antonio, Texas, as an instructor, where he became a second lieutenant. He survived a terrible crash there in which the student he was instructing froze on the stick in a nose dive, and was killed. Southee survived, but he was left with serious facial scars the rest of his life, as surgeons substituted a perpetual mustache for his left eyebrow.

Southee attended the Wharton School of Business at the University of Pennsylvania in the 1920s. To put himself through school, he barnstormed and ferried aircraft. After college, he became an airport and flying-school manager for Curtiss.

His love for aviation turned to gliding in the early 1930s. He was a founder of the Soaring Society of America (1931) and managed 'Glider Meets' (National Gliding and Soaring Championships), at Elmira, New York, during the mid to late 1930s.

In 1940, Southee became an inspector for what was then called the Civilian Aeronautical Authority, the predecessor of the Federal Aviation Administration. During World War II, he was one of the leaders of the highly successful Civilian Pilot Training Program.

Earl Southee died in 1967 in Athens, Pennsylvania.

== Honors ==
He was inducted into the Soaring Hall of Fame in 1982.
