= Unionville, Centre County, Pennsylvania =

Borough in Pennsylvania, US

Unionville, Pennsylvania
- Borough
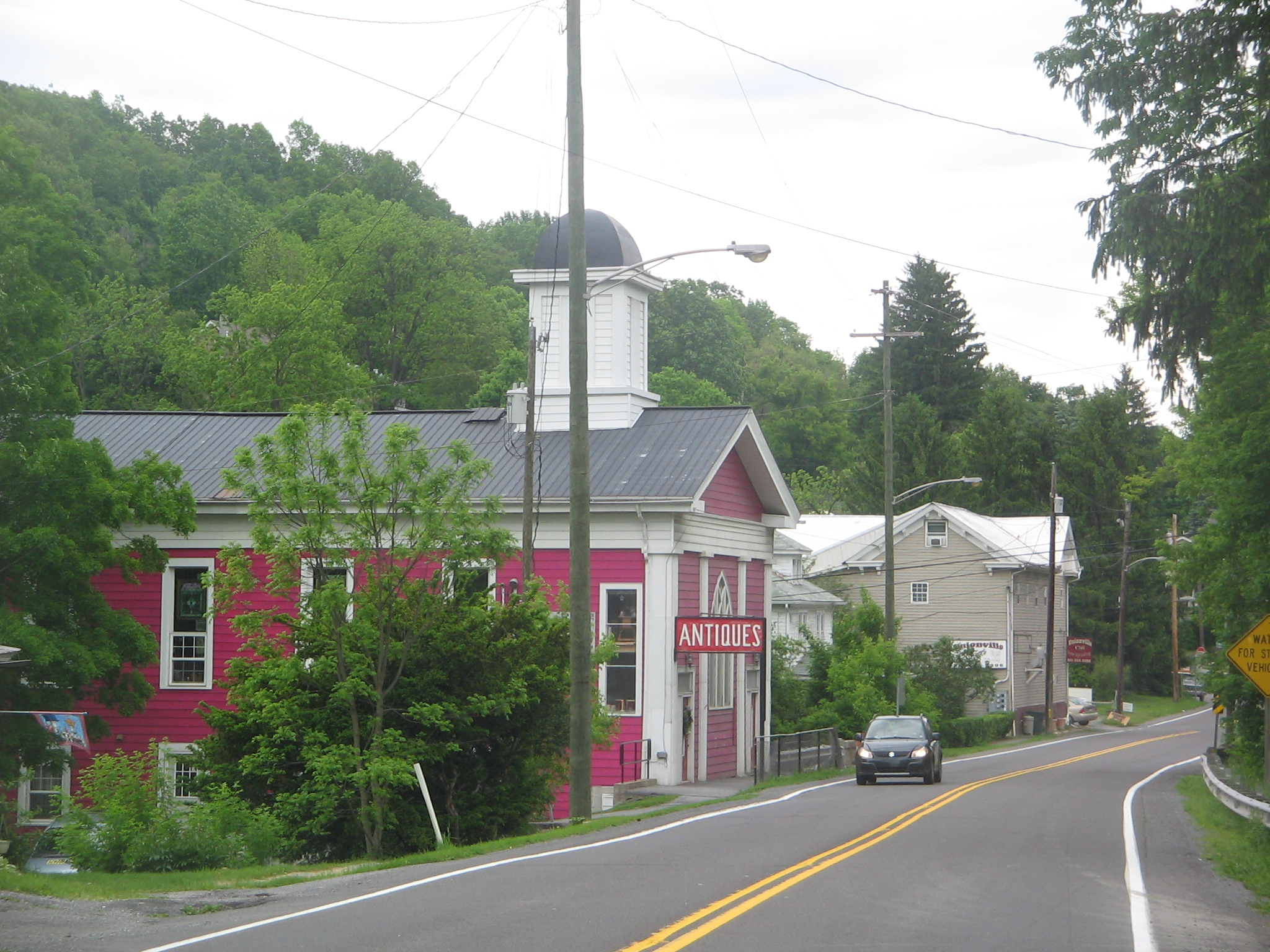
- Looking northeast into Unionville along ALT US 220

- Location in Centre County, Pennsylvania

- Location in Pennsylvania Location in the United States
- Coordinates: 40°54′25″N 77°52′31″W
- Country: United States
- State: Pennsylvania
- County: Centre
- Settled: 1848
- Incorporated (borough): 1859

Area
  - Total: 0.24 sq mi (0.61 km^{2})
  - Land: 0.24 sq mi (0.61 km^{2})
  - Water: 0 sq mi (0.00 km^{2})
- Elevation: 787 ft (240 m)

Population (2010)
  - Total: 291
  - Estimate (2019): 289
  - Density: 1,220.8/sq mi (471.37/km^{2})
- Time zone: Eastern (EST)
  - Summer (DST): EDT
- Area code: 814
- FIPS code: 42-78616
- GNIS feature ID: 1215064
- Website: unionvilleborough.com

Unionville is a borough in Centre County, Pennsylvania, United States. It is part of the Bald Eagle Valley and the State College, Pennsylvania Metropolitan Statistical Area. As of the 2010 census, the borough had a total population of 291.

== History ==
A Late Woodland village that was occupied between AD 1200 and 1600, now known as the Fisher Farm site, is located along Bald Eagle Creek on Unionville's western edge.

The village was laid out in 1848 at the site of temporary lumber camps in the Bald Eagle Valley. Unionville became the third borough incorporated in Centre County in 1859, and became a station along the Bald Eagle Valley Railroad in 1864.

In the 1860s a pink Methodist church was built in the borough. In 2015 it became an art exhibit known as Marry's Pink Church.

In 2024 Unionville flooded due to heavy rains from Tropical Storm Debby.

=== Historic District ===
In 1979, the Unionville Historic District was listed on the National Register of Historic Places. The district, which includes virtually all of Unionville, was added to the Register for its high quality of preservation since before World War I. Nearly two hundred buildings in the borough qualified as contributing properties.

== Geography ==
Unionville is located at 40°54′25.16″N 77°52′31.80″W (40.90698, -77.87550).

According to the United States Census Bureau, the borough has a total area of 0.3 square miles (0.7 km^{2}), all land.

== Demographics ==
Historical population
Census	Pop.	Note	%±
1870	320		—
1880	399		24.7%
1890	348		−12.8%
1900	360		3.4%
1910	343		−4.7%
1920	311		−9.3%
1930	304		−2.3%
1940	321		5.6%
1950	341		6.2%
1960	371		8.8%
1970	375		1.1%
1980	361		−3.7%
1990	284		−21.3%
2000	313		10.2%
2010	291		−7.0%
2019 (est.)	289		−0.7%

As of the census of 2010, there were 291 people, 123 households, and 83 families residing in the borough. The population density was 1,099.3 inhabitants per square mile (424.4/km^{2}). There were 130 housing units at an average density of 491.1 per square mile (189.6/km^{2}). The racial makeup of the borough was 97.6% White, 0.3% Black or African American, 0.7% Asian, 0.7% from other races, and 0.7% from two or more races. Hispanic or Latino of any race were 0.7% of the population.

There were 123 households, out of which 26.8% had children under the age of 18 living with them, 53.7% were married couples living together, 2.4% had a male householder with no wife present, 11.4% had a female householder with no husband present, and 32.5% were non-families. 26.8% of all households were made up of individuals, and 10.6% had someone living alone who was 65 years of age or older. The average household size was 2.37 and the average family size was 2.84.

In the borough the population was spread out, with 19.2% under the age of 18, 8.7% from 18 to 24, 26.5% from 25 to 44, 31.2% from 45 to 64, and 14.4% who were 65 years of age or older. The median age was 42 years. For every 100 females there were 87.7 males. For every 100 females age 18 and over, there were 85.0 males.

The median income for a household in the borough was $34,792, and the median income for a family was $31,964. The per capita income for the borough was $21,735. About 21.7% of families and 22.9% of the population were below the poverty line, including 44.4% of those under the age of 18 and 6.7% of those 65 and older.

== In popular culture ==
The film Unstoppable, based on the CSX 8888 incident, features a scene in Unionville.

The Ridge Soaring Gliderport, which is just southwest of Unionville, is featured in a scene of the 1999 movie The Thomas Crown Affair.

== Notable people ==
Herman Fisher, founder of the Fisher-Price toy and game corporation, was born in Unionville.
