= List of inductees of the Soaring Hall of Fame =

The Soaring Hall of Fame recognizes individuals who have made the highest achievements in, or contributions to, the sport of soaring in the United States of America. It has been located at the National Soaring Museum in Elmira, New York, since 1975. The Hall has inducted the following people, arranged in alphabetical order, with their year of induction in parentheses.

- George Applebay (1999)
- Leslie R. Arnold (1983)
- Ralph S. Barnaby (1955)
- Lewin B. Barringer (1955)
- Stephen J. Bennis (1977)
- Paul F. Bikle (1960)
- Howard C. Blossom (1989)
- William Hawley Bowlus (1954)
- William G. Briegleb (1958)
- John M. Brittingham (1985)
- Francis P. Bundy (2001)
- Howard E. Burr (1987)
- Richard W. Butler (2007)
- Jay Buxton (1956)
- Edward F. Byars (1992)
- John Byrd (2004)
- Bruce Carmichael (2002)
- Bernard S. Carris (1986)
- Jon D. Carsey (1961)
- Octave Chanute (1999)
- J. Shelley Charles (1960)
- H. M. Claybourn (1969)
- Henry G. Combs (1988)
- Francis B. Compton (1972)
- William H. Coverdale, Jr. (1978)
- Alex Dawydoff (1967)
- Chester Decker (1978)
- Helen R. Dick (1968)
- Richard C. duPont (1954)
- Stephen duPont (1987)
- Warren E. Eaton (1954)
- Lawrence E. Edgar (1971)
- Einar K. Enevoldson (2010)
- Edward S. Evans (2002)
- R.E. Franklin (1957)
- Lanier Frantz (1986)
- Robert E. Gaines (2011)
- John W. "Dr.Jack" Glendening (2014)
- H. Ray Gimmey (2000)
- John F. Good (2011)
- Ben W. Greene (1970)
- Frank R. Gross (1995)
- Doris F. Grove (1988)
- Stanley A. Hall (1974)
- Harriet Hamilton (2003)
- E. Gene Hammond (1996)
- Patricia Hange (2003)
- Albert E. Hastings (1973)
- Carl Herold (1996)
- Barron Hilton (1991)
- William C. Holbrook (1974)
- Richard Johnson II (1956)
- William S. Ivans (1962)
- Douglas L. Jacobs (1990)
- William Frank Kelsey (1981)
- Wolfgang Klemperer (1954)
- Thomas L. Knauff (1997)
- Joachim P. Kuettner (1981)
- Johann G. Kuhn (1994)
- John W. Laister (1969)
- Doug Lamont (1992)
- Lianna Lamont (1992)
- Hal M. Lattimore (1989)
- Allen L. Leffler (2001)
- Emil A. Lehecka (1982)
- Parker Leonard (1973)
- Lloyd M. Licher (1982)
- Joseph C. Lincoln (1961)
- Hannes M. Linke (1998)
- Paul B. MacCready, Jr. (1954)
- Lyle Maxey (2002)
- Donald S. Mitchell (1990)
- George B. Moffat, Jr. (1963)
- John J. Montgomery (2001)
- Robert Lee Moore (2000)
- Ted Nelson (1985)
- Leonard A. Niemi (2004)
- John K. O'Meara (1956)
- Rudolf Opitz (1993)
- Thomas Page (1975)
- Alvin H. Parker (1965)
- Ramon H. Parker (1964)
- James M. Payne (2008)
- Irving O. Prue (1964)
- August Raspet (1956)
- E. J. Reeves (1970)
- John Robinson (1954)
- Harland C. Ross (1959)
- Bertha M. Ryan (1972)
- John D. Ryan (1966)
- Alcide Santilli (1979)
- Victor M. Saudek (1980)
- Gustav Scheurer (1975)
- Richard E. Schreder (1962)
- Wilfred C. Schuemann (2006)
- Arthur B. Schultz (1957)
- Ernest Schweizer (1955)
- Paul A. Schweizer (1955)
- Virginia B. Schweizer (1971)
- William Schweizer (1984)
- Wally Scott (1965)
- Grenville L. Seibels II (1998)
- Harner Selvidge (1976)
- Bob Semans (2003)
- Edgar D. Seymour (1995)
- Theodore E. Sharp (1983)
- A. J. Smith (1968)
- Bernald S. Smith (1984)
- Stanley W. Smith (1957)
- Earl R. Southee (1982)
- Charles Spratt (1993)
- William C. Sproull (1997)
- Robert M. Stanley (1976)
- Sterling V. Starr (1979)
- Joseph P. Steinhauser (1994)
- Harvey Stephens (1966)
- Karl H. Striedieck II (1980)
- Floyd J. Sweet (1963)
- Robert F. Symons (1958)
- Paul E. Tuntland (1955)
- Gunter Voltz (2004)
- Bernard L. Wiggin (1977)
- Elizabeth Woodward (1967)
- Orville Wright (1955)
- Wilbur Wright (1955)
- Eugart W. Yerian (1991)

== See also ==
- List of notable glider pilots
- National Aviation Hall of Fame
- National Soaring Museum
- North American aviation halls of fame
