= The Thomas Crown Affair (1968 film) =

Heist film by Norman Jewison

- Theatrical release poster
- Directed by: Norman Jewison
- Written by: Alan R. Trustman
- Produced by: Norman Jewison
- Starring: Steve McQueen; Faye Dunaway; Paul Burke; Jack Weston
- Cinematography: Haskell Wexler
- Edited by: Hal Ashby; Ralph E. Winters; Byron Brandt
- Music by: Michel Legrand
- Production companies: The Mirisch Corporation; Simkoe; Solar Productions
- Distributed by: United Artists
- Release date: June 19, 1968
- Running time: 102 minutes
- Country: United States
- Language: English
- Budget: $4.3 million
- Box office: $14 million

The Thomas Crown Affair is a 1968 American heist film directed by Norman Jewison and written by Alan R. Trustman. Starring Steve McQueen, Faye Dunaway, Paul Burke, and Jack Weston, the film follows Vicki Anderson (Dunaway), who is hired to investigate the culprits of a multi-million dollar bank heist orchestrated by Thomas Crown (McQueen).

The film was nominated for two Academy Awards, winning Best Original Song for Michel Legrand's "The Windmills of Your Mind". A remake was released in 1999, and a second remake is set to be released in 2027. A Hong Kong version of the movie was released in 1987 under the title Easy Money, starring Michelle Yeoh as Thomas Crown's female version.

== Plot ==
Multi-millionaire businessman Thomas Crown is a handsome, dashing, cultured adrenaline junkie. Out of boredom, he masterminds a five-man heist of $2.66 million from a Boston bank, with the getaway driver dumping the money in a quiet cemetery trash can. None of the men ever meet Crown face to face, nor know or meet each other before the robbery. Crown retrieves the money after secretly trailing the drop. He deposits it into a numbered bank account in Geneva over several trips to avoid suspicion.

Independent investigator Vicki Anderson is contracted by the bank's insurance company to investigate the heist; she will receive 10% of the stolen money if she recovers it. Speculating that whoever planned the robbery was familiar with the bank's routines because he had an account there, and that the stolen money has been spirited to Switzerland, Vicki and the police draw up a list of bank customers who have made several recent trips to Geneva. When she sees Crown's profile on the list, she intuitively recognizes him as capable of orchestrating the robbery, and shortly thereafter guesses the cellular method that he used to organize the robbers.

Growing closer to her quarry, Vicki makes it clear to Crown that she knows he is the thief and that she intends to prove it. A game of cat and mouse ensues, which spurs both a physical and emotional attraction that soon evolves into an affair. This complicates Vicki's vow to find the money and help detective friend Eddy Malone bring the perpetrator to justice.

A reward offer entices the wife of the getaway driver, Erwin Weaver, to inform on him for $25,000. Vicki finds out that he was hired by a man he never saw but whose voice he heard (via a microphone). She tries placing Erwin in the same room as Crown, but there is no hint of recognition on either's part.

While Vicki is clearly closing in on Crown, even using the Internal Revenue Service (IRS) as leverage against his liquid assets, he forces her to realize the extent of her conflicted emotions. When she seemingly persuades him to negotiate an end, Malone stubbornly refuses to make any deal, leaving her torn between the men, her convictions, and her heart.

Crown organizes another robbery exactly like the first with different accomplices and tells Vicki where the "drop" will be, because he has to know for sure that she is on his side. The robbery goes off like clockwork.

Choosing her loyalty, Vicki and the police stake out the cemetery, where they watch one of the robbers make the drop, then lie in wait to ambush Crown. However, when his Rolls-Royce arrives, he has sent a messenger in his place, with a telegram inviting her to either bring the money and join him or to keep the car as a consolation prize. Reflexively smiling at his eluding her trap, she soon realizes she had revealed her hand yet gained nothing in return. Tearing the telegram to bits, she strews the pieces to the wind, tearfully staring at the sky while Crown escapes unruffled overhead.

== Cast ==
- Steve McQueen as Thomas Crown
- Faye Dunaway as Vicki Anderson
- Paul Burke as Detective Eddy Malone
- Jack Weston as Erwin Weaver
- Biff McGuire as Sandy
- Addison Powell as Abe
- Gordon Pinsent as Jamie
- Yaphet Kotto as Carl
- Sidney Armus as Arnie
- Richard Bull as booth guard
- Peg Shirley as Honey
- Tom Rosqui as private detective
- Michael Shillo as Swiss banker
- Astrid Heeren as Gwen

== Production ==
A pioneering split screen photography technique used to show simultaneous actions was inspired by the breakthrough Expo 67 films In the Labyrinth and A Place to Stand. The latter debuted the use of Christopher Chapman's "multi-dynamic image technique" of images shifting on moving panes. Steve McQueen was on hand for an advance screening of A Place to Stand in Hollywood, and personally told Chapman he was highly impressed; the following year, Norman Jewison incorporated the technique into the film by inserting split screen scenes into the already finished product.

The film also features a chess scene, with McQueen and Dunaway playing a game of chess, silently flirting with each other. The game depicted is based on a game played in Vienna in 1898 between Gustav Zeissl and Walter von Walthoffen. The game was played on a Cantonese Export 1820-1850 "Burmese" Pattern chess set.

McQueen performed his own stunts, which include playing polo and driving a dune buggy at high speed along the Massachusetts coastline.

Vicki Anderson's car, referred to as "one of those red Italian things", is the first of only ten Ferrari 275 GTB/4S NART Spiders built. Today, this model is one of the most valuable Ferrari road cars made. McQueen liked the car very much, and eventually managed to acquire one for himself. The dune buggy was a Meyers Manx. McQueen owned one. Crown's two-door Rolls-Royce Silver Shadow carried the Massachusetts vanity license plate "TC 100" for the film.

Sean Connery had been the original choice for the title role, but turned it down—a decision he later regretted. Johnny Carson also turned down the role.

=== Filming ===
The film was shot primarily on location in Boston and surrounding areas in Massachusetts and New Hampshire:

- The Second Harrison Gray Otis House at 85 Mt. Vernon Street on Beacon Hill, Boston, stood in for the Thomas Crown home
- The first robbery was filmed at what was then the Beverly National Bank (fictitiously renamed Boston Mercantile Bank for the film) at the North Beverly Plaza, Beverly, Massachusetts
- The second robbery was filmed at 55 Congress Street, Boston. The current location is noted as 44 Water Street, the offices of private investment firm, Brown Brothers.
- A scene of the car theft was filmed in downtown Beverly across from City Hall
- The money dumpings were shot in Mount Auburn Cemetery, Coolidge Avenue, Cambridge, Massachusetts
- The polo sequences were filmed at the Myopia Hunt Club, 435 Bay Road, South Hamilton, Massachusetts.
- The golf sequences were filmed at the Belmont Country Club, 181 Winter Street, Belmont, Massachusetts
- The auctions took place in the St. James Ballroom at the Eben Jordan Mansion, 46 Beacon Street, Beacon Hill
- Crown drove his dune buggy on Crane Beach in Ipswich, Massachusetts
- The Schweizer SGS 1-23H glider was flown at Salem, New Hampshire, by Roy McMaster
- The meat shop scene took place at Blackstone Street and North Street in Boston's North End
- Thomas and Vicki walked in the rain in Copp's Hill Cemetery in Boston's North End
- Thomas and Vicki kissed (wearing formal dress) at the top of Acorn Street on Beacon Hill, a narrow, cobblestone lane often called "the most photographed street in America"

Other locations included:

- the Allston-Brighton tollbooths (demolished in 2016) on the Massachusetts Turnpike
- Anthony's Pier 4 restaurant at 140 Northern Avenue in South Boston's Seaport District
- the Boston Common
- the old Boston Police Headquarters on Berkeley Street (since renovated as the Loews Boston Hotel)
- Cambridge Street and Linden Street, Allston
- Copp's Hill Terrace in Boston's North End
- the North End Greenmarket
- South Station, 700 Atlantic Avenue, Boston
- the Tobin Bridge
- the Prudential Tunnel portion of the Massachusetts Turnpike going under Huntington Avenue (then-future Massachusetts Route 9) —years before the Westin Hotel in Copley Square and the parking garage on Clarendon Street were built over the toll highway
- the then-Dewey Square Tunnel (future Interstate 93), where McQueen emerges on the Massachusetts Turnpike; a feat technically impossible since McQueen drove into the Prudential Tunnel one scene earlier
- the Marliave Restaurant rooftop dining area, Bosworth Street, Boston, where Dunaway is shown surveillance photos by Burke of McQueen kissing another woman
- the footpath on the Boston side of the Charles River, between the Weeks Footbridge and the Anderson Bridge, with the dome of Dunster House visible in the background on the Cambridge side
- Dulles International Airport, Virginia, with signage making it look as if it were in Boston

== Release ==
The Thomas Crown Affair had its world premiere in Boston on June 19, 1968, with openings in Los Angeles and New York on June 26, 1968, and a nationwide release in August 1968. This film's release introduced United Artists' new logo that shows the iconic Transamerica "T" and the byline, "Entertainment from Transamerica Corporation". The Thomas Crown Affair made its American television premiere on NBC Saturday Night at the Movies in September 1972.

The film was released on DVD by MGM Home Entertainment in the United States in February 1999 with two special features, an audio commentary by director Norman Jewison and theatrical trailer. It was first released on Blu-ray Disc on February 1, 2011, with the same extra supplements. On February 13, 2018, Kino Lorber (under license from MGM) released a Blu-ray 50th anniversary edition with six extra features, including an original featurette with cast and crew interviews, audio commentary by film historians Lem Dobbs and Nick Redman, and an interview with the director.

== Reception ==
=== Box office ===
The Thomas Crown Affair grossed $14 million on a $4.3 million budget.

=== Critical response ===
Reviews at the time were mixed. Critics praised the chemistry between McQueen and Dunaway and Norman Jewison's stylish direction, but considered the plotting and writing rather thin. Roger Ebert gave it two-and-a-half stars out of four, calling it "possibly the most under-plotted, underwritten, over-photographed film of the year. Which is not to say it isn't great to look at. It is."

Film critic of the time, Pauline Kael, called it "pretty good trash" and likened the film to enjoyable entertainment not to be confused with art.

On the review aggregator website Rotten Tomatoes, the film holds an approval rating of 70% based on 40 reviews, with an average rating of 6.5/10. The website's critics consensus reads, "Steve McQueen settles into the role with ease and aplomb, in a film that whisks viewers into an exotic world with style and sex appeal." Metacritic, which uses a weighted average, assigned the film a score of 66 out of 100, based on 7 critics, indicating "generally favorable" reviews.

=== Accolades ===
Award	Category	Recipient(s)	Result	Ref.
Academy Awards	Best Original Score for a Motion Picture (Not a Musical)	Michel Legrand	Nominated	
Academy Awards	Best Song – Original for the Picture	"The Windmills of Your Mind"; Music by Michel Legrand; Lyrics by Alan and Marilyn Bergman	Won	
British Academy Film Awards	Anthony Asquith Award for Original Film Music	Michel Legrand	Nominated	
Golden Globe Awards	Best Original Score – Motion Picture	Michel Legrand	Nominated	
Golden Globe Awards	Best Original Song – Motion Picture	"The Windmills of Your Mind"; Music by Michel Legrand; Lyrics by Alan and Marilyn Bergman	Won	
Laurel Awards	Top Action-Drama		5th Place	
Laurel Awards	Top Male Dramatic Performance	Steve McQueen	5th Place	

== Soundtrack ==
The Thomas Crown Affair

Soundtrack album by Michel Legrand, Noel Harrison
- Released: 1968 (original); June 10, 2014 (expansion)
- Recorded: 1968
- Genre: Soundtrack
- Length: 70:39 (expansion)
- Labels: United Artists Records (original); Quartet (expansion)

The music was composed and conducted by Michel Legrand, scoring his first major American film. Director Norman Jewison had hoped to hire Henry Mancini for the project, but he was unavailable and recommended Legrand; he wrote his music as long pieces rather than specifically to scene timings, with the film later edited to the music by Legrand, Jewison and editor Hal Ashby. In addition, Legrand also had to prepare an original song to replace "Strawberry Fields Forever", used as the temporary track for the glider scene. Taking Quincy Jones' advice, Legrand worked with the Bergmans to compose "The Windmills of Your Mind" and a second song, "His Eyes, Her Eyes"; Noel Harrison recorded "The Windmills of Your Mind" after Jewison failed to get his friend Andy Williams to do it, while Legrand performed "His Eyes, Her Eyes". Although the film's score was recorded in Hollywood, featuring Vincent DeRosa, Bud Shank, Carol Kaye, Emil Richards, Ray Brown and Shelly Manne, the album re-recording issued by United Artists Records on LP was done in France under the composer's baton; Jewison said it was the favorite score for any of his films.

The original album was later reissued by Rykodisc in 1998 on CD, with five dialogue excerpts and the inclusion of "Moments of Love" and "Doubting Thomas". Varèse Sarabande re-released the album in 2004 (without the dialogue excerpts). In 2014, Quartet Records issued a limited edition CD featuring the previously released album tracks (1–13 below) and the premiere release of the film version.

=== Expanded album track listing ===
1. "The Windmills of Your Mind", performed by Noel Harrison – 2:24
2. "Room Service" – 1:41
3. "A Man's Castle" – 2:41
4. "The Chess Game" – 5:58
5. "Cash and Carry" – 2:35
6. "His Eyes, Her Eyes", performed by Michel Legrand – 2:17
7. "Playing the Field" – 5:48
8. "Moments of Love" – 2:19
9. "The Boston Wrangler" – 2:49
10. "Doubting Thomas" – 3:48
11. "The Crowning Touch" – 2:59
12. "The Windmills of Your Mind" – 2:22
13. "His Eyes, Her Eyes" – 2:15
14. "The Windmills of Your Mind", performed by Noel Harrison – 2:25
15. "Knock, Knock" – 0:50
16. "The Gang" – 3:02
17. "Getaway" – 0:52
18. "Escapeline" – 1:28
19. "Cemetery" – 1:20
20. "More Cemetery" – 1:19
21. "Enter Vicky" – 0:25
22. "The Windmills of Your Mind", performed by Noel Harrison – 1:25
23. "Polo" – 0:47
24. "Brandy" – 1:33
25. "Chess Anyone?" – 4:26
26. "Let's Play Something Else" – 1:18
27. "Togetherness" – 1:38
28. "Don't Bug Me" – 1:15
29. "Beach House" – 1:01
30. "Love Montage" – 1:21
31. "No Deals" – 1:01
32. "All My Love, Tommy" – 3:07

== In popular culture ==
- The film's famous kissing scene, which is depicted on the film's poster, was used in Hal Ashby's satirical film Being There (1979). Ashby was The Thomas Crown Affair's associate producer and editor.
- The music video for Madonna's 1998 single "The Power of Good-Bye" is based on the chess scene from the film.
- The chess scene is parodied in the 1999 film Austin Powers: The Spy Who Shagged Me.

== Remakes ==
=== 1999 film ===
The 1999 remake was released starring Pierce Brosnan as Crown, Rene Russo as the insurance investigator, and Denis Leary as the detective. The original film's co-star Faye Dunaway also appears as Crown's therapist. This adaptation is different from the original in that it is set in New York rather than Boston, and the robbery is of a priceless painting, a Monet, instead of cash, among other story line differences, including the complete lack of violence in Thomas Crown's crimes.

==== Planned sequel ====
In January 2007, a sequel to the 1999 film, loosely based on Topkapi (1964), was announced as being in development. By January 2009, Brosnan confirmed his involvement while announcing Paul Verhoeven as director. By April 2010, Verhoeven stepped down from his role as director, citing creative differences and scheduling conflicts. At various points in time, both Angelina Jolie and Charlize Theron were in discussions for roles in the film, with Brosnan expressing interest in having Theron co-star. In April 2013, Brosnan acknowledged the project's status in development hell, while stating he is still interested in developing the film. In April 2014, John McTiernan revealed that he had written a treatment for the script, titled Thomas Crown and the Missing Lioness. The initial script had been written by John Rogers from a story he had co-written with Harley Peyton, while additional material was provided by Nick Meyer, Michael Finch and Karl Gajdusek.

=== 2027 film ===
In 2016, Michael B. Jordan had approached Metro-Goldwyn-Mayer to pitch a new adaptation of the story, with hopes of starring in the lead role. In April 2023, after having acquired MGM, Amazon announced plans to reboot the franchise, with a new feature film in development through the company's Amazon Studios, later rebranded as Amazon MGM Studios. On September 11, 2024, it was announced that Michael B. Jordan had returned to direct and star in the new film, with Drew Pearce writing. On April 25, 2025, The Thomas Crown Affair was announced for a release date for March 5, 2027.

== See also ==
- List of American films of 1968
