= Julian, Pennsylvania =

Unincorporated community in Pennsylvania, US

- Census-designated place
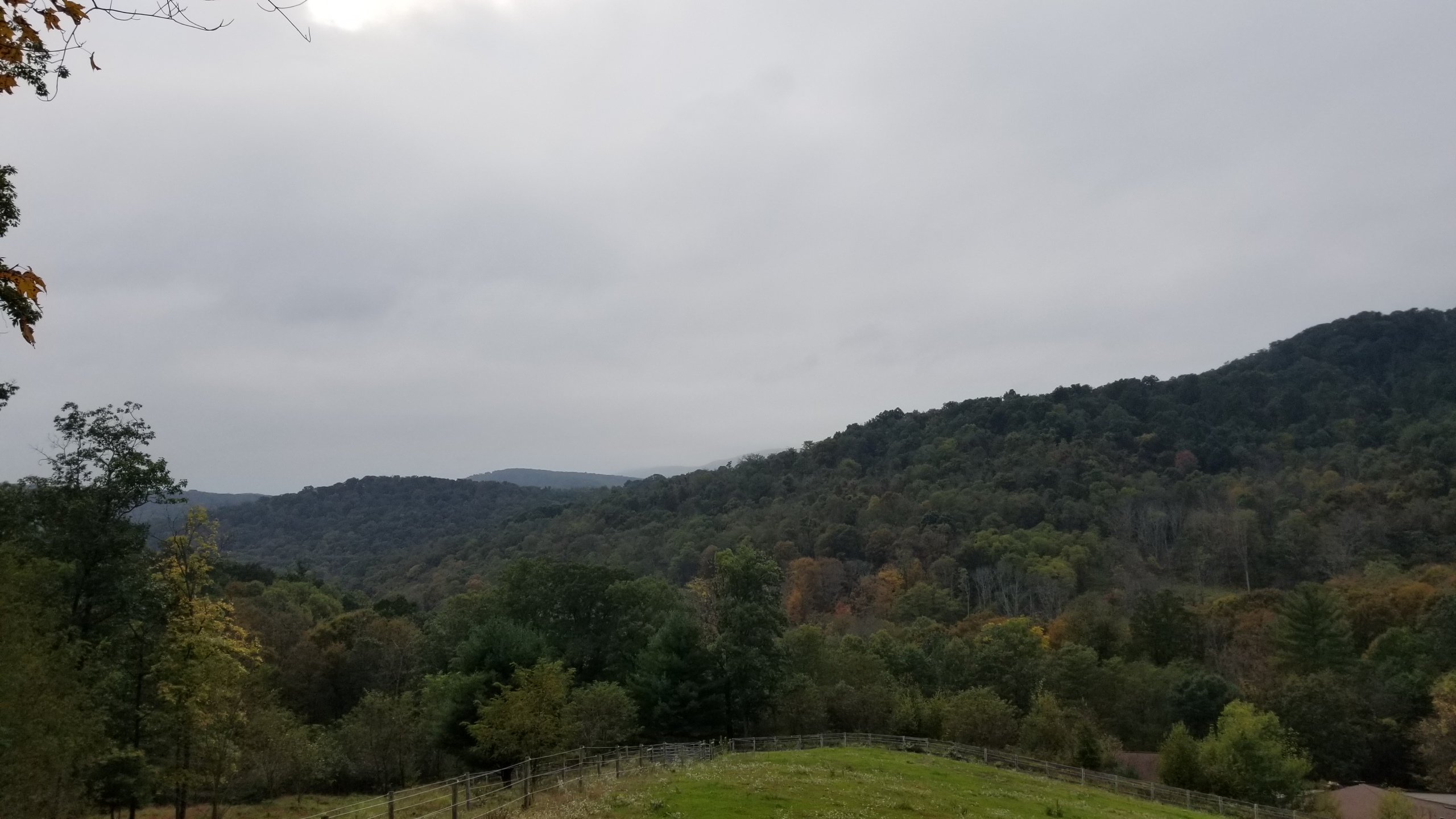
- View from a farm in Julian

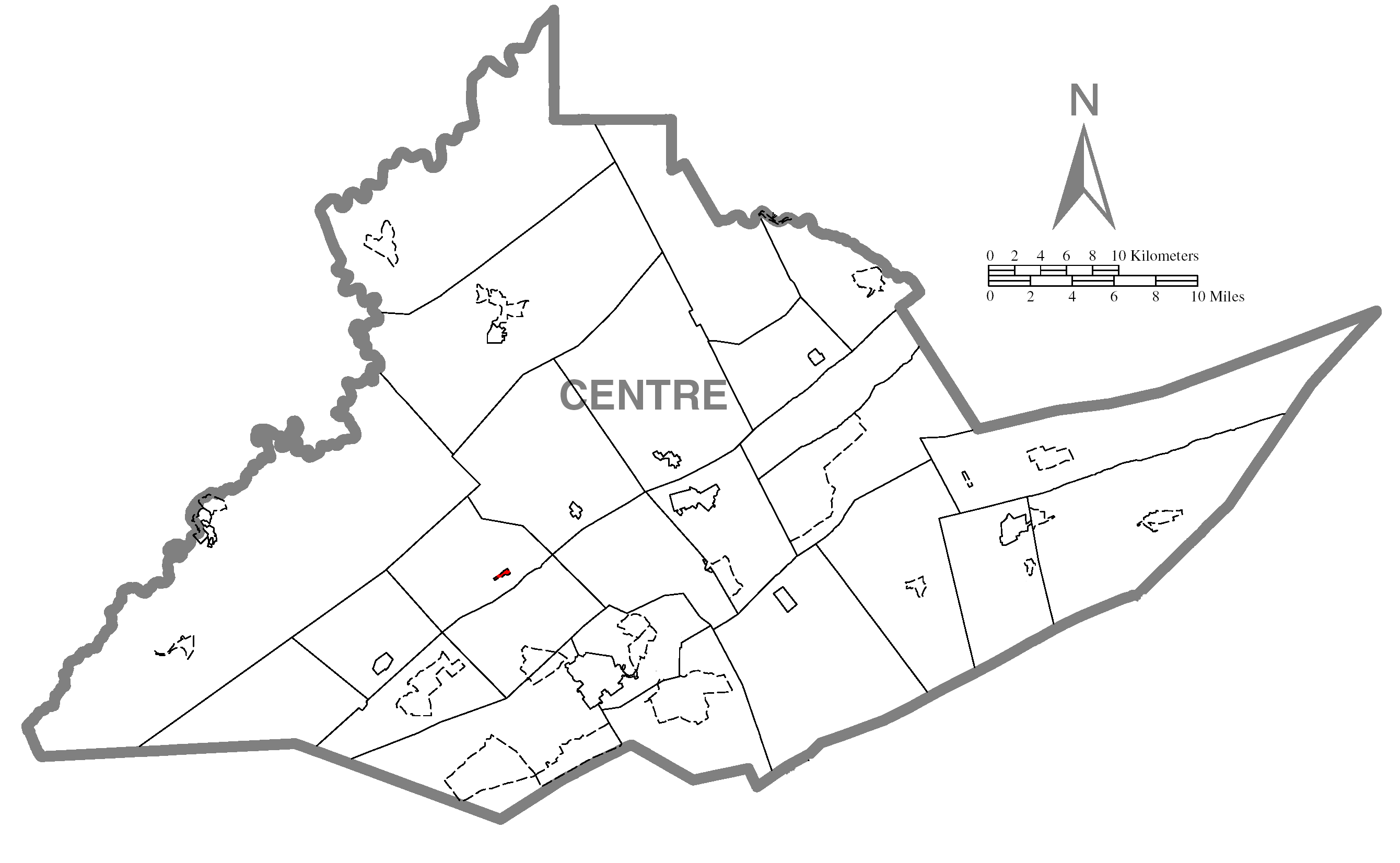
- Location within Centre County

- Location within the U.S. state of Pennsylvania Julian (the United States)
- Coordinates: 40°51′48″N 77°56′26″W
- Country: United States
- State: Pennsylvania
- County: Centre
- Township: Huston

Area
  - Total: 0.15 sq mi (0.38 km^{2})
  - Land: 0.15 sq mi (0.38 km^{2})
  - Water: 0 sq mi (0.00 km^{2})
- Elevation: 850 ft (260 m)

Population (2020)
  - Total: 146
  - Density: 985.6/sq mi (380.54/km^{2})
- Time zone: UTC-5 (Eastern (EST))
  - Summer (DST): UTC-4 (EDT)
- ZIP code: 16844
- Area code: 814
- FIPS code: 42-38528
- GNIS feature ID: 1178189

Julian (/ˌdʒuːliˈæn/ JOO-lee-AN) is an unincorporated community and census-designated place (CDP) that is located in Huston Township, Centre County, Pennsylvania, United States. It is part of the State College, Pennsylvania Metropolitan Statistical Area. The population was 152 at the 2010 census. It is part of the larger Bald Eagle Valley.

The community was originally named Juliana Furnace after Julia Ann Irvin, the wife of James Irvin, the proprietor of a local blast furnace.

== Geography ==
Julian is located southwest of the center of Centre County at 40°51′48″N 77°56′26″W (40.863230, -77.940677), in southeastern Huston Township. It is in the valley of Bald Eagle Creek, with Bald Eagle Mountain rising to the southeast and foothills of the Allegheny Front to the northwest. U.S. Route 220 Alternate passes through the town, leading northeast 10 miles (16 km) to Milesburg and southwest 8 miles (13 km) to Port Matilda. State College is 10 miles (16 km) to the southeast across Bald Eagle Mountain.

According to the United States Census Bureau, the CDP has a total area of 4.20 square miles (10.9 km^{2}), all land.

== Demographics ==
Historical population
Census	Pop.	Note	%±
2020	146		—
U.S. Decennial Census

As of the census of 2010, there were 152 people, 59 households, 39 families residing in the CDP. The population density was 1,064.0 people per square mile (410.8 people/km^{2}). There were 65 housing units at an average density of 452.2 per square mile (174.6/km^{2}). The racial makeup of the CDP was 99.3% White and 0.7% from other races.

There were 59 households, out of which 27.1% had children under the age of 18 living with them, 54.2% were married couples living together, 5.1% had a male householder with no wife present, 6.8% had a female householder with no husband present, and 33.9% were non-families. 27.1% of all households were made up of individuals, and 13.6% had someone living alone who was 65 years of age or older. The average household size was 2.58 and the average family size was 3.10.

In the CDP, the population was spread out, with 19.7% under the age of 18, 6.1% from 18 to 24, 24.3% from 25 to 44, 25.6% from 45 to 64, and 24.3% who were 65 years of age or older. The median age was 45 years. For every 100 females, there were 111.1 males. For every 100 females age 18 and over, there were 110.3 males.

The median income for a household in the CDP was $58,750, and the median income for a family was $72,500. The per capita income for the CDP was $23,232. About 11.1% of families and 14.3% of the population were below the poverty line.
