= Union District, Mason County, West Virginia =

- Magisterial district
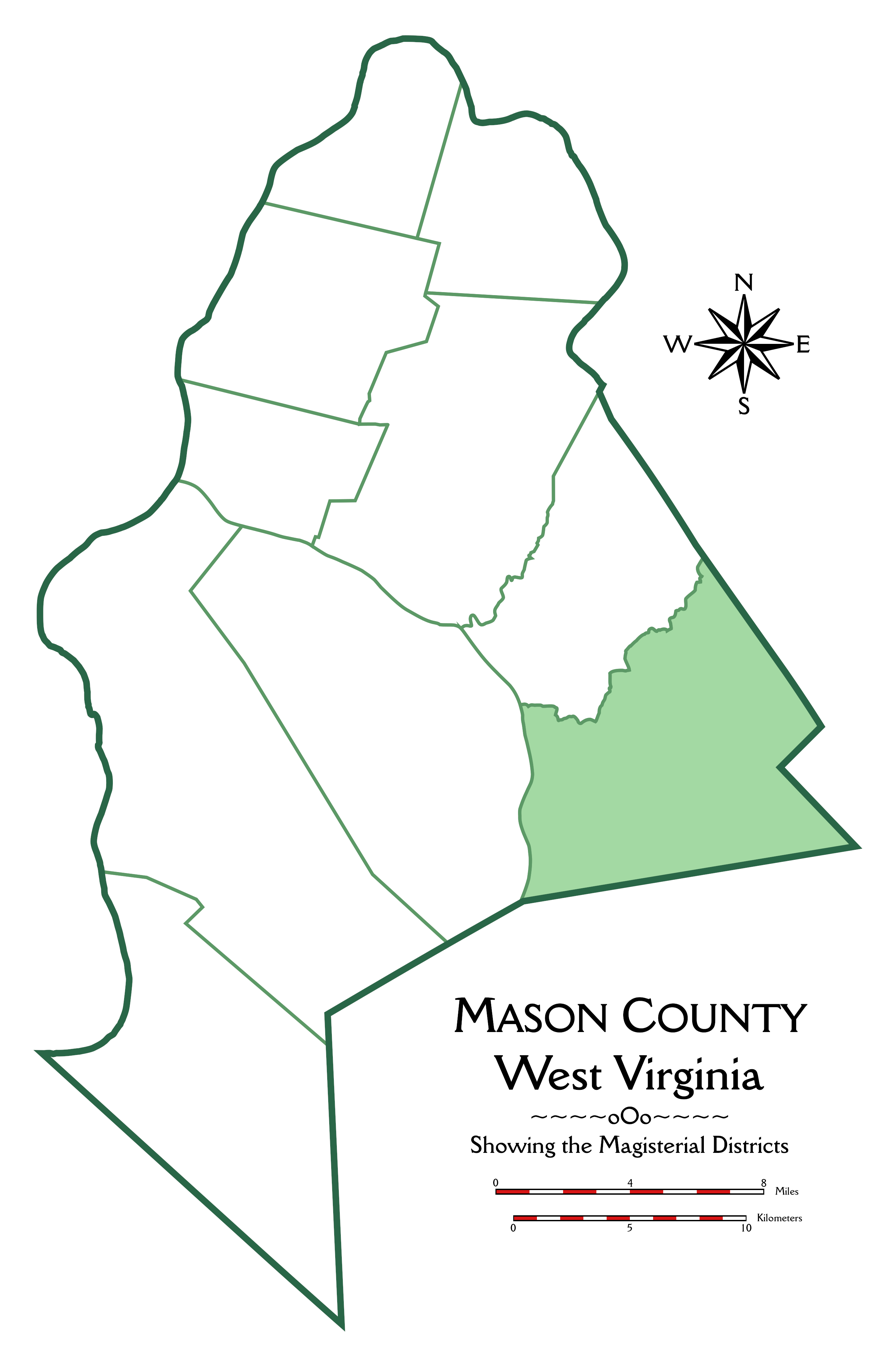
- Location of Union District in Mason County
- Coordinates: 38°42′55″N 81°52′22″W
- Country: United States
- State: West Virginia
- County: Mason
- Established: 1863

Area
  - Total: 54.83 sq mi (142.0 km^{2})
  - Land: 54.42 sq mi (140.9 km^{2})
  - Water: 0.41 sq mi (1.1 km^{2})
- Elevation: 643 ft (196 m)

Population (2020)
  - Total: 1,261
  - Density: 25/sq mi (9.7/km^{2})
- Time zone: UTC-5 (Eastern (EST))
  - Summer (DST): UTC-4 (EDT)
- GNIS feature ID: 1928387

Union Magisterial District is one of ten magisterial districts in Mason County, West Virginia, United States. The district was originally established as a civil township in 1863, and converted into a magisterial district in 1872. In 2020, Union District was home to 1,261 people.

== Geography ==
Union District is located in the eastern part of Mason County, between Jackson County, Putnam County, and the Kanawha River. To the north, it is bounded by Cologne District; to the east by the Western District of Jackson County, formerly Union and Ripley Districts; to the south by the Buffalo-Union District of Putnam County, formerly Buffalo and Union Districts; and to the west by the Kanawha River and Arbuckle District in Mason County.

At nearly fifty-five square miles, Union is the third-largest of Mason County's ten magisterial districts, following Clendenin and Arbuckle Districts. The terrain is steep and hilly, except for the bottomlands along the Kanawha and on Thirteenmile Creek. Although rough, the soil through most of the district is a fertile mixture of various clays, that in the bottoms consists of a mixture of white clay and black loam. The hills are suitable for livestock and pasturage.

=== Streams ===
The main streams in Union District are Thirteenmile Creek, which drains nearly the entire district, and Arbuckle Creek, which arises in northern Putnam County, then flows northwest into Union District, joining the Kanawha at Grimms Landing.

The headwaters of Thirteenmile Creek arise in southwestern Jackson County. Numerous tributaries join the main branch of Thirteenmile Creek in its upper course, including Peppermint Creek in Jackson County; as well as Little Spruce Run, Bee Run, and Spruce Run, with its tributaries, Horse Cave Run and Little Horse Cave Run; the McCoy Fork or Baker Branch, Yeager Fork, and Poplar Fork, part of which forms the boundary with Cologne District. Just above Nat, Thirteenmile is joined by the Mudlick Fork, a sizable creek by itself, which was named by Daniel Boone during the period that he lived in Mason County, and earned his living by hunting and trapping.

The Mudlick Fork arises in the easternmost corner of Mason County, and its upper waters and some of its tributaries extend into the northern part of Putnam County. In its course, the Mudlick is joined by the Bailey Branch, the Beech Fork and its tributary, the Warner Branch, which enter Mudlick just below Tribble; Sapsucker Run, with its tributary, the Bill King Branch, which join the Mudlick above Elmwood; and Wolf Creek.

In its lower course, as it approaches the western end of the district, and turns northward, Thirteenmile is joined by Buzzard Creek, and its tributary, Little Buzzard Creek; Cabin Creek, Tom Allen Creek, and the Rocky Fork, part of which forms a portion of the boundary between Union and Cologne Districts, before flowing into Thirteenmile at Waterloo. From here, Thirteenmile continues north into Cologne District, where it empties into the Kanawha River at Leon.

=== Communities ===
There are no incorporated towns in Union District, but there are a number of unincorporated communities, including Arbuckle, Capehart, Deerlick, Elmwood, Grimms Landing, Gunville, Nat, Stevens, Tribble, Waterloo, and Yeager.

=== Roads and travel ===
The only highways in Union District are West Virginia Route 62, which follows the Kanawha Valley between Point Pleasant and Buffalo, in Putnam County, passing through the western part of the district, and West Virginia Route 87, which follows the northern part of the boundary between Cologne and Union Districts, as it travels between Baden in Cologne District, and Evans in Jackson County.

The Kanawha River Railroad operates travels through the Kanawha Valley in the southwestern part of Cologne District. Leasing its lines from Norfolk Southern, the railway carries freight from southeastern West Virginia to central Ohio. This line was originally part of the Kanawha and Michigan Railroad. Until the twentieth century, a ferry operated between Grimms Landing and McCausland on the western shore of the Kanawha.

== History ==
Historical population
Census	Pop.	Note	%±
1870	1,084		—
1880	2,174		100.6%
1890	2,316		6.5%
1900	2,452		5.9%
1910	2,217		−9.6%
1920	1,951		−12.0%
1930	1,619		−17.0%
1940	1,516		−6.4%
1950	1,341		−11.5%
1960	1,127		−16.0%
1970	1,058		−6.1%
1980	1,083		2.4%
1990	1,115		3.0%
2000	1,234		10.7%
2010	1,358		10.0%
2020	1,261		−7.1%
United States Census Bureau, U.S. Decennial Census, 1870–2020.

The first European settler in Union District was Jesse Van Bibber, (Note: Also "Van Bebber", the spelling used in Hardesty's.) who first came to the Ohio Valley as a soldier serving in Colonel Andrew Lewis' force of Virginia Militia during Lord Dunmore's War, and was commended for his bravery at the Battle of Point Pleasant, in 1774. Van Bibber, his brother, John, and their families settled in Mason County a few years after the end of the War of Independence, at a time when Indians still traveled on both sides of the Ohio. About 1788 or 1789, two of the Van Bibber children were killed in an attack on John Van Bibber's cabin. A third was captured in a separate incident, and lived for a year with an Indian family, before escaping and returning to Point Pleasant. Around this period, Jesse Van Bibber befriended Daniel Boone, who lived at Point Pleasant from 1788 to 1795. They hunted together in the land that would become Union District, where Boone bestowed the name of "Mudlick" on the largest tributary of Thirteenmile Creek. Van Bibber built his cabin on Thirteenmile Creek, probably soon after the 1795 Treaty of Greenville, which forced the Indians out of the Ohio Valley, effectively ending the threat of Indian raids in the Kanawha Valley.

William Arbuckle, the brother of Matthew Arbuckle, settled in Union District in 1797. He had attempted to do so as early as 1792, but was compelled to take refuge in Fort Randolph at Point Pleasant due to the continuing threat posed by the Indians. Like Jesse Van Bibber, Arbuckle was a veteran of the Battle of Point Pleasant. He went on to serve under Andrew Lewis during the War of Independence, then joined George Rogers Clark on his expedition to the northwest. Soon after settling along Thirteenmile Creek, Arbuckle saw an Indian shoot a recluse named Samuel Lewis near the latter's cabin at the mouth of Big Sixteenmile Creek, on the west bank of the Kanawha. Lewis was the last settler shot by an Indian in the Kanawha Valley. Arbuckle and his wife nursed Lewis back to health, and he settled near the falls of Thirteenmile Creek, afterward known as "Lewis Falls".

More settlers arrived around 1800, and began to spread up the valley of Thirteenmile Creek to the Mudlick Branch. James Ringsbury and Samuel Smith built a water-powered grist mill in 1822, adding a saw mill to the original construction a few years later. The first church was organized in 1823 by Francis Wilson, a Methodist minister who had come to the area in 1818; another minister, William George, organized the Harmony Baptist Church in 1832. The latter year saw the death of John Harrison from cholera; he was the first victim of the great epidemic that swept through the region in 1832. The district's first post office was established in 1837, under the name of "Arbuckle". It originally stood below the mouth of Eighteenmile Creek, just within the present limits of Mason County, but in 1856 it was moved two miles downriver, to the current location of Arbuckle village.

After West Virginia gained its independence from Virginia in 1863, the legislature enacted a law requiring the counties to be divided into civil townships. Mason County was divided into ten townships, each of which was named after a pioneer settler of Mason County. Union Township was originally named in honor of Jesse Van Bibber, the first settler of the district, but in the midst of the patriotic fervor of the Civil War, it was soon renamed "Union", a name it came to share with districts in twenty-three other counties, including all three of Mason County's neighbors in West Virginia. Like the other townships, Cologne was converted into a magisterial district in 1872.

Because Mason County's boundaries have been relatively stable since the formation of Putnam County in 1848, Union is the only district that has had a significant boundary change since its inception. Originally, the upper waters of Thirteenmile Creek lay in Mason County. In 1866, a trapezoidal section, including the upper course of Thirteenmile and the village of Rockcastle, was removed from the easternmost portion of Union Township, and attached to Ripley District in Jackson County.

In the late nineteenth century, Union District was still heavily forested, and contained a vast supply of commercially valuable timber. In 1882, Hardesty's Biographical Atlas of Mason County described

various oaks, hickory, sugar [maple], pine, [tulip] poplar, walnut, locust, beech, and sycamore, some of the latter, along Thirteen, attaining an enormous size. An immense quantity of timber is every year floated to market upon the waters of Thirteen, being caught at the mouth of the creek in the booms constructed by the Oxley Stave Company, of Cincinnati.

The district's iron ore and metallurgical coal were also being commercially exploited.
