= Cooper District, Mason County, West Virginia =

- Magisterial district
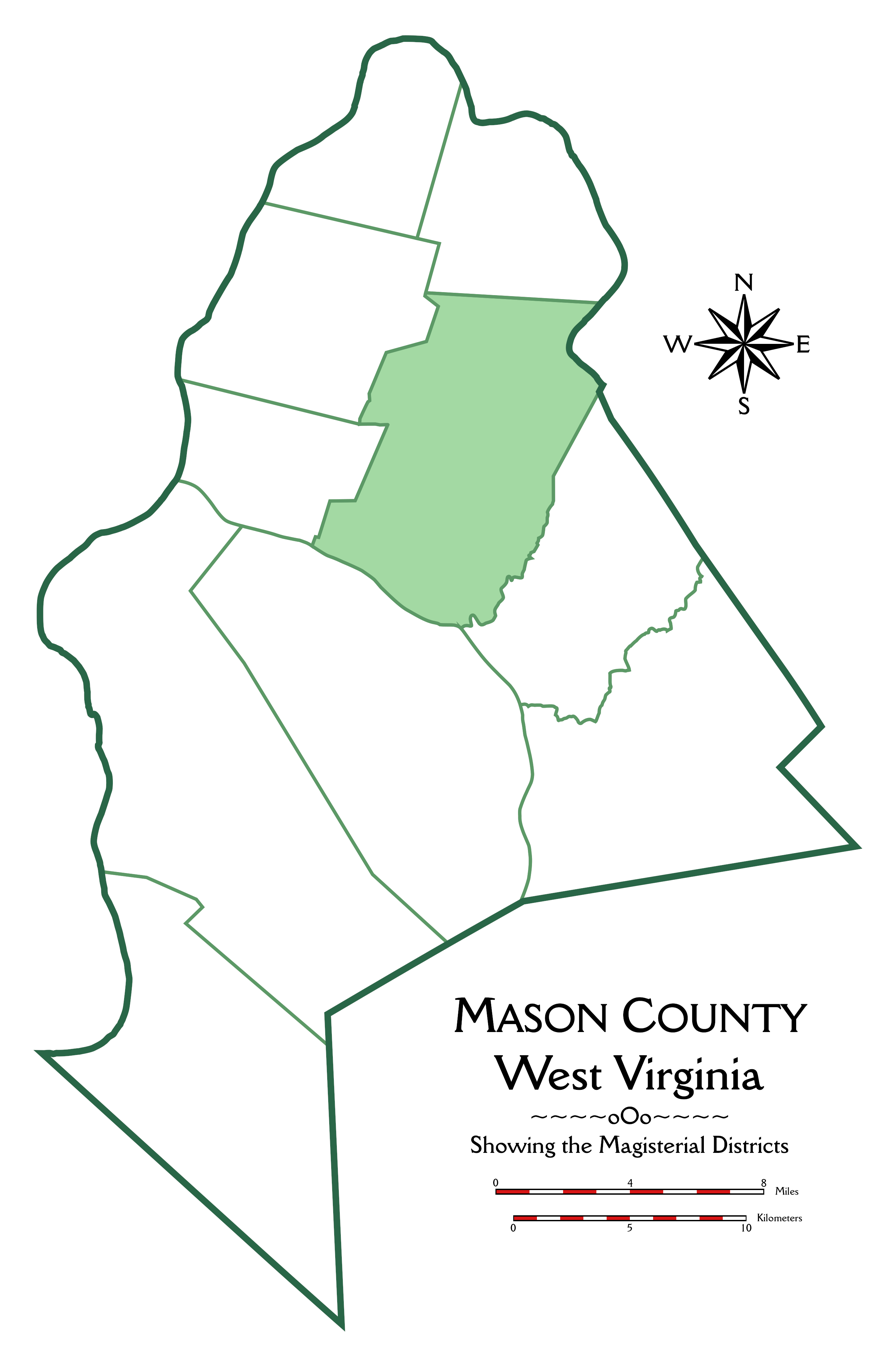
- Location of Cooper District in Mason County
- Coordinates: 38°50′57″N 81°59′09″W
- Country: United States
- State: West Virginia
- County: Mason
- Established: 1863
- Named after: Leonard Cooper

Area
  - Total: 52.81 sq mi (136.8 km^{2})
  - Land: 51.49 sq mi (133.4 km^{2})
  - Water: 1.32 sq mi (3.4 km^{2})
- Elevation: 646 ft (197 m)

Population (2020)
  - Total: 1,700
  - Density: 35/sq mi (14/km^{2})
- Time zone: UTC-5 (Eastern (EST))
  - Summer (DST): UTC-4 (EDT)
- GNIS feature ID: 1928198

Cooper Magisterial District is one of ten magisterial districts in Mason County, West Virginia, United States. The district was originally established as a civil township in 1863, and converted into a magisterial district in 1872. In 2020, Cooper District was home to 1,700 people.

== Geography ==
Cooper District is located in the northern portion of Mason County, between the Ohio and Kanawha Rivers. To the north, Cooper is bounded by Graham District, to the northeast by the Ohio, to the east by Cologne District, to the south by the Kanawha, and to the west by Lewis and Robinson Districts. Arbuckle District lies across the Kanawha to the south, and to the northeast, on the far side of the Ohio is Letart Township, in Meigs County, Ohio. The district includes Letart Island, a half-mile long island near the southernmost point of the Great Bend of the Ohio River, just above Letart Falls, a former rapid, now submerged, lying between Letart, West Virginia and Letart Falls, Ohio.

At nearly fifty-three square miles, Cooper District ranks fifth in size out of Mason County's ten magisterial districts, following Clendenin, Arbuckle, Union, and Hannan. Most of the district is covered by hills and ridges, separated by narrow valleys, except for a relatively small proportion of bottom lands located along the Ohio and Kanawha Rivers. At a height of thirteen hundred feet, Fenley's Peak, in the center of Cooper District, is the highest point in Mason County. Fertile soil characterizes both the hills and valleys.

The main streams flowing into the Kanawha River from Cooper District are Rockcastle Creek, which flows southwest and enters the river at Ambrosia; Eightmile Creek, which flows out of the hills behind Brighton, and Kanawha Tenmile Creek, which forms the boundary between Cooper and Cologne Districts for most of its length. The Lick Fork and Kings Branch of Kanawha Tenmile, along with the latter's tributary, Shade Fork, lie within Cooper District; the Cooper Fork is in Cologne. In the central portion of the district are the headwaters of Threemile Creek, which flows westward into Lewis District before entering the Kanawha; the upper course of Oldtown Creek, which flows westward through Robinson District, before turning south and entering the Ohio River in Lewis District north of Point Pleasant; the Fallentimber Branch and Trace Fork of Oldtown Creek, along with the upper part of another tributary, Rayburn Creek; the upper course of Robinson Run, which flows westward into Robinson District, before joining Oldtown Creek; and the upper part of the Wolfpen Branch of Robinson Run. Flowing northward into the Ohio are Tombleson Run, and its tributary, Claylick Run, which enter the river above Letart Island; Mud Run, which joins the Ohio at Letart; and Brinker Run, which enters the river above the Racine Locks and Dam.

There are no incorporated towns in Cooper District, but there are several unincorporated villages, including Ambrosia, Ash, Board, Brighton, Debby, Flat Rock, Greer, Harmony, Letart, Oak Grove, and Santown.

Two highways run through Cooper District. West Virginia Route 2, locally known as the Clarksburg Road, passes through the district from west to east, between Point Pleasant, at the mouth of the Kanawha, and Ravenswood, in Jackson County. West Virginia Route 62 follows the Kanawha River to Point Pleasant along the southern part of Cooper District, locally known as Charleston Road, then follows the course of the Ohio River north, passing through the northwestern part of the district, where it is known as Graham Station Road. Other important routes include Sand Hill Road, which runs through the middle of the county between Point Pleasant and Letart. The Racine Locks and Dam is located in the Ohio River off Route 62 below Letart.

The Kanawha River Railroad travels through the Kanawha Valley in the southern part of Cooper District. Leasing its lines from Norfolk Southern, the railway carries freight from southeastern West Virginia to central Ohio. This line was originally part of the Kanawha and Michigan Railroad. A second line, originally part of the Baltimore and Ohio Railroad, and now part of CSX, follows the course of the Ohio River for the length of the county, traveling through the northern part of Cooper District on its way from Huntington to Parkersburg. Until the early twentieth century, a ferry carried passengers across the Ohio between Letart and Letart Falls; another operated on the Kanawha River between Debby and Beech Hill.

== History ==
Historical population
Census	Pop.	Note	%±
1870	1,204		—
1880	1,945		61.5%
1890	2,385		22.6%
1900	2,480		4.0%
1910	2,085		−15.9%
1920	1,828		−12.3%
1930	1,659		−9.2%
1940	1,631		−1.7%
1950	1,537		−5.8%
1960	1,390		−9.6%
1970	1,270		−8.6%
1980	1,718		35.3%
1990	1,697		−1.2%
2000	1,781		4.9%
2010	1,874		5.2%
2020	1,700		−9.3%
United States Census Bureau, U.S. Decennial Census, 1870–2020.

The first European settler in Cooper District was Leonard Cooper, who in 1792 built a blockhouse near the mouth of Eightmile Creek for protection against the Indians. At the time, there were no other fortifications between Point Pleasant and the Coal River. Other settlers soon followed. The first schoolhouse was built near the headwaters of Threemile Creek about 1806. The district's first post office was established at Letart Falls about 1840, followed by those at Flat Rock and Brighton.

After West Virginia gained its independence from Virginia in 1863, the legislature enacted a law requiring the counties to be divided into civil townships. Mason County was divided into ten townships, each of which was named after a pioneer settler of Mason County. Like the other townships, Cooper was converted into a magisterial district in 1872. It is the only Cooper District in the state.

== Communities ==
The village of Letart, occasionally referred to as Letart Falls, like the village on the opposite side of the river, (Note: Considerable confusion arises from the different names attached to the places in this neighborhood. "Letart Falls" specifically refers to the rapids in the Ohio River below Letart Island. Letart Township in Meigs County lies northeast of the falls, and Letart Falls, Ohio is the village adjacent to the river, while Letart, West Virginia is on the opposite side. However, Letart Falls, Ohio is sometimes referred to as "Letart", while Letart, West Virginia, is sometimes called "Letart Falls", making it difficult to determine whether casual references to "Letart" or "Letart Falls", without additional context, refer to the falls, the township, or either of the two villages. To further confuse matters, the Letart, West Virginia post office serves a large area in Cooper and Graham Districts, leading to places several miles from the tiny village of Letart being referred to as "Letart, West Virginia".) developed at the mouth of Mud Run, near the rapids that gave both settlements their name. The falls, in turn, are said to have been named after a young man who drowned in the Ohio at an early date. For a number of years, Letart was the site of several boat yards, where flat boats and barges were constructed, earning the village the nickname of "Chiselburg".

Located on the headwaters of Robinson Run, about a mile and a quarter southeast of White Church, the community of Board takes its name from Oldtown-Board Baptist Church, itself named after Andrew Board, who came to Mason County from Wirt County after the Civil War, and helped establish a church in the little valley below Upper Flats. Board preferred the name "Oldtown" after Oldtown Creek, of which Robinson Run is a tributary, but over his objections the congregation insisted on adding his name to the church.

Debby, on the Kanawha River below Tenmile Creek, was the site of a post office, and the Beech Hill station of the Kanawha & Michigan Railway, opposite Beech Hill in Arbuckle District.

Flat Rock was built along the Clarksburg Road, now West Virginia 2, on the upper waters of Oldtown Creek, eight miles east of Point Pleasant. Adolph Hess built the first store there in 1867, and other settlers soon followed, with a post office established in 1873.
