= Hannan District, Mason County, West Virginia =

- Magisterial district
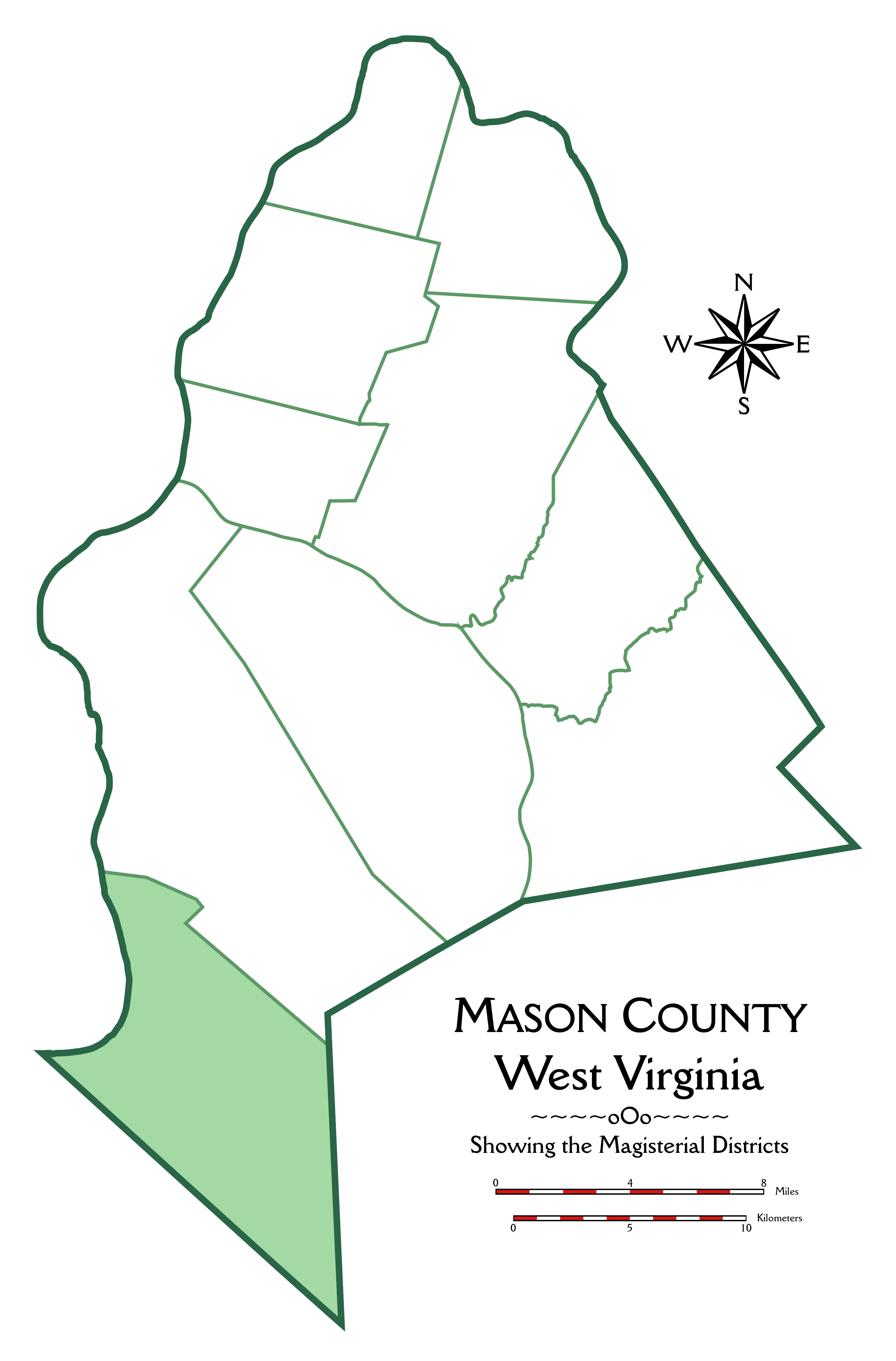
- Location of Hannan District in Mason County
- Coordinates: 38°34′39″N 82°07′19″W
- Country: United States
- State: West Virginia
- County: Mason
- Established: 1863
- Named after: Thomas Hannan

Area
  - Total: 53.53 sq mi (138.6 km^{2})
  - Land: 51.96 sq mi (134.6 km^{2})
  - Water: 1.57 sq mi (4.1 km^{2})
- Elevation: 758 ft (231 m)

Population (2020)
  - Total: 2,688
  - Density: 56/sq mi (22/km^{2})
- Time zone: UTC-5 (Eastern (EST))
  - Summer (DST): UTC-4 (EDT)
- GNIS feature ID: 1928285

Hannan Magisterial District is one of ten magisterial districts in Mason County, West Virginia, United States. The district was originally established as a civil township in 1863, and converted into a magisterial district in 1872. In 2020, Clendenin District was home to 2,688 people.

== Geography ==
Hannan District is located along the Ohio River in the southern part of Mason County. To the northeast, it is bounded by Clendenin District; to the east, by Buffalo-Union District in Putnam County, formerly Buffalo and Teays Valley Districts; to the southwest, by District 5 in Cabell County, formerly Grant and Union Districts; and to the northwest by the Ohio River; across the river is Ohio Township in Gallia County, Ohio.

With an area of fifty-three and a half square miles, Hannan is the fourth-largest of Mason County's ten magisterial districts, behind Clendenin, Arbuckle, and Union. The river and creek bottoms in the northern and western part of the district are level and feature a sandy soil, while the hills that occupy the majority of the district are covered with a mixture of white loam and red clay. Hardesty's Biographical Atlas of Mason County describes a variety of timber, building sandstone, and a vein of anthracite coal running through the district.

=== Streams ===
The main streams of Hannan District are Sixteenmile Creek, Eighteenmile Creek, and Guyan Creek, all of which flow into the Ohio River. The only other streams of note are the upper waters of Trace Creek, a tributary of Hurricane Creek in Putnam County, in the southernmost portion of Hannan District; and the upper course of Evans Creek, which flows eastward into Putnam County near Mount Olive, eventually joining Five and Twenty Mile Creek. At one time, Flatfoot Creek joined the Ohio at the northern end of Hannan district, but the main course of this creek was diverted westward at Hogsett in order to make way for the state fish hatchery and wetlands at the Robert C. Byrd Locks and Dam.

Sixteenmile, also known as the "Ohio Sixteenmile" to distinguish it from Big Sixteenmile and Little Sixteenmile Creeks in Arbuckle District, both of which empty into the Kanawha, arises in the ridges of the western part of Arbuckle District, in the center of the county, and flows south and west for most of its course through Clendenin District, meeting several tributaries, until crossing into Hannan District at its northern end. Here it meets with Jerrys Run, flowing westward out of Clendenin, and meanders southwest across the Ohio River bottom, meeting with Stonecoal Run, and joining the Ohio just below Mercers Bottom, near the site of Hayman's Landing.

Eighteenmile Creek begins in western Putnam County, and flows northward toward Mason County, where it turns westward and crosses the southern tip of Clendenin District, joining with several tributaries in its upper course: Whitepine Creek and its Spring Branch just as it enters Mason County, then the Road Fork as it crosses Clendenin District. In Hannan District, Eighteenmile is joined by Mud Run and the Hughes Branch, coming from the north, and by the Right Fork, Fees Branch, and Rocky Fork coming from the south. The creek then emerges from the hills south of Ashton, and crosses the floodplain in a southwesterly direction until it joins the Ohio.

Guyan Creek flows out of the hills west of Upland, in the center of Hannan District, and flowing west and south meets with Bear Hollow Creek, flowing northwest out of the southern part of the district, then the Knife Branch coming from the north. Guyan is then joined by the Trace Fork, flowing northward out of Cabell County, and bringing with it the waters of Lynn Fork and the Jenkins Branch. The creek then meanders along the county line, meeting with Bryan Creek in Cabell County, the McCowan Branch in Mason County, and Spurlock Creek in Cabell County. Guyan Creek then empties into the Ohio just east of the boundary with Cabell County.

=== Communities ===
There are no incorporated settlements in Hannan District, but there are several unincorporated villages, including Apple Grove, Mercers Bottom, Ashton, and Glenwood along the Ohio River, Upland and Mount Olive in the eastern part of the district, and the former villages of Bryan and Ellen in the center.

Mercers Bottom, originally Mercer's Bottom, located along the Ohio River in the northern part of the district, is the oldest settlement in Hannan District, having received its first postmaster in 1833. The post office at Mercers Bottom was closed in 1935, and the mail redirected to nearby Apple Grove.

Located at a high point along the Ohio River bottom, Apple Grove received its post office in 1872. The village is home to a chemical plant, originally built by the Goodyear Tire and Rubber Company in 1959, and since 2018 known as APG Polytech, a subsidiary of Taiwanese textile manufacturer Far Eastern New Century.

Glenwood, located at a narrow part of the river bottom in the western end of the district, received its post office in 1877, while Ashton, just below Mercers Bottom, received its in 1882. Upland, located on a plateau in the eastern part of the district, is the location of Hannan High School, and had its own post office from 1857 to 1909. Mount Olive, on a ridge three miles south of Upland, had a post office from 1872 to 1906.

=== Roads and transportation ===
The only highway in Hannan District is West Virginia Route 2, which runs along the Ohio River between Huntington and Point Pleasant. Other important roads include Jerry's Run Road, or County Road 37, which runs eastward from Route 2 at Mercers Bottom to U.S. Route 35 at Pliny, in Putnam County; and Ashton-Upland Road, County Road 41, which runs southeast from Route 2 at Ashton to Upland in the interior part of the district. From there, the road continues south to Mount Olive, and then to Milton in Cabell County, where it becomes John Morris Road; Mount Zion Road runs eastward from Upland to Fraziers Bottom in Putnam County, while Five and Twenty Mile Creek Road runs northeast from Mount Olive, also finishing at Fraziers Bottom.

A Baltimore and Ohio Railroad line, now part of CSX, runs parallel to the Ohio River and West Virginia 2 through the western part of the district, transporting freight between Huntington and Parkersburg, and providing service to the chemical plants at Apple Grove and Gallipolis Ferry, West Virginia, as well as the Mountaineer Power Plant and former Philip Sporn Power Plant at Graham Station, in the northern end of the county. There are no river crossings in Hannan District, but until the twentieth century, there were ferries over the Ohio at Mercers Bottom and Glenwood.

== History ==
Historical population
Census	Pop.	Note	%±
1870	1,551		—
1880	2,285		47.3%
1890	2,236		−2.1%
1900	2,518		12.6%
1910	2,628		4.4%
1920	2,295		−12.7%
1930	1,913		−16.6%
1940	2,190		14.5%
1950	2,142		−2.2%
1960	2,060		−3.8%
1970	1,835		−10.9%
1980	2,186		19.1%
1990	2,233		2.2%
2000	2,461		10.2%
2010	3,017		22.6%
2020	2,688		−10.9%
United States Census Bureau, U.S. Decennial Census, 1870–2020.

When the first Europeans began to settle in the southern portion of Mason County, they found the remains of an Indian village near the Ohio River near the boundary with Cabell County. The area had once been home to various groups of Native Americans, including those now known as the Mound Builders from the remains of their earthen structures, but by the mid-eighteenth century it was largely uninhabited. This was probably due to pressure from the Iroquois Confederacy, which is thought to have pushed most of the aboriginal inhabitants west of the Ohio. The village found at the western end of Hannan District, together with a Shawnee town near the mouth of the Great Kanawha, which still existed in colonial times, and was known to the colonists as "Oldtown", were two of the last Indian habitations on the eastern side of the Ohio.

The first step in the colonization of Hannan District was a grant made to the heirs of Hugh Mercer, a Revolutionary General, who had been a friend and ally of George Washington. Mercer fell at the Battle of Princeton in 1777, and in recognition of his service, Congress issued a grant of sixteen thousand acres along the fertile river bottom above the mouth of Eighteenmile Creek. The details of the original survey are uncertain, but George Washington had led a survey of lands on both sides of the Kanawha in 1772, and may have recommended the area. The land was later sold to the settlers in various parcels by the general's grandson, Charles Fenton Mercer.

Prior to 1790, the only structure in the area was a hunting cabin built by Andrew Fleming and one of the Mercers. That year, Thomas Hannan purchased the land on which the cabin stood, and became the first European to settle permanently in the district. He was followed by Jesse George, who settled at the mouth of Flatfoot Creek, and then by many others. Hannan himself did much to develop the area, operating a ferry across the Ohio River at the mouth of Guyan Creek, and supervising the construction of the first road connecting the Teays Valley in central West Virginia with the inland town of Chillicothe, in Ohio, a span of over one hundred miles, now traversed by U.S. Route 35. In 1810, Hannan built a floating grist mill at his landing on the Ohio River, just within the western boundary of the county. Hannan's son, Jesse, is said to have been the first European child born in the district, while his daughter, Elizabeth, was the first bride married there.

Among the early pioneers of Hannan District were brothers Robert and John Hereford, who settled on either side of the mouth of Sixteenmile Creek in 1807 and 1808. John Hereford had served as an adjutant under Lafayette. Robert Hereford built the county's first brick house in 1811. He constructed a grist mill on Sixteenmile Creek in 1815, followed by the district's first sawmill. Arriving in 1810 was John M. Hanly, the district's first blacksmith. John Amos, a cabinetmaker, came to the area about this time.

The first schoolhouse in the district was a log cabin built for the purpose in 1805. It was a subscription school, for which the surrounding families paid $2.50 per scholar, or $1.00 per month. Eighteen students were taught by schoolmaster Henry, Thomas Hannan's father-in-law. Other schools were opened by John Hereford at Mercer's Bottom in 1808, and by Jacob Ward at Eighteenmile Creek in 1815.

In 1820, John Alderson brought the first Baptist church to the area with the opening of Green Bottom Church, a square log structure build on land donated by Thomas Hannan. Among Alderson's successors was William George, who later founded Baptist churches in Arbuckle and Union Districts. Burwell Spurlock was minister of the first Methodist congregation, which met at "Hereford Church" beginning in 1825.

After West Virginia gained its independence from Virginia in 1863, the legislature enacted a law requiring the counties to be divided into civil townships. Mason County was divided into ten townships, each of which was named after a pioneer settler of Mason County. Hannan Township was named in honor of Thomas Hannan, the first European settler of the area. Like the other townships, Hannan was converted into a magisterial district in 1872. It is the only Hannan District in the state.
