= Cologne District, Mason County, West Virginia =

- Magisterial district
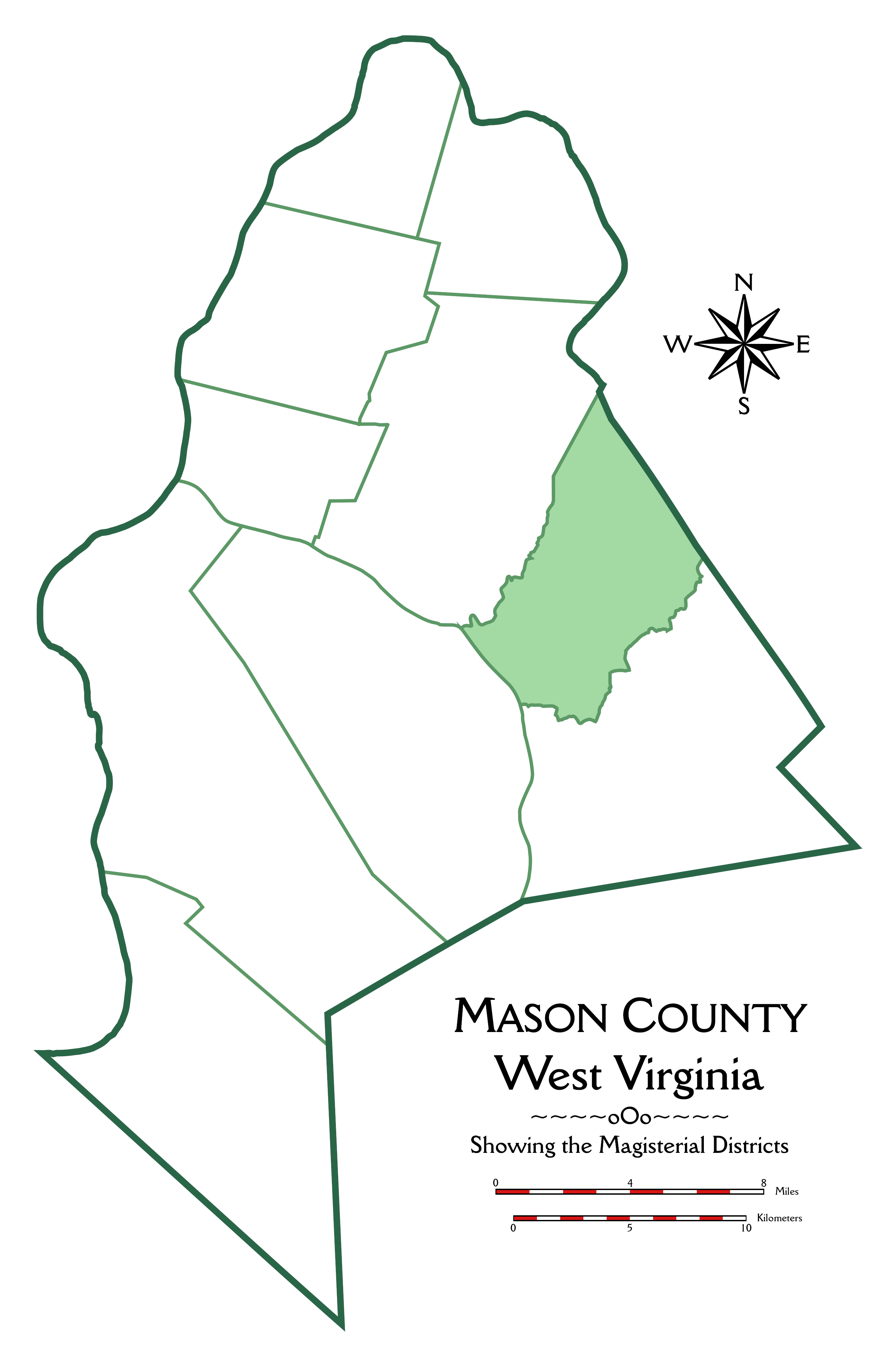
- Location of Cologne District in Mason County
- Coordinates: 38°47′46″N 81°54′51″W
- Country: United States
- State: West Virginia
- County: Mason
- Established: 1863

Area
  - Total: 35.55 sq mi (92.1 km^{2})
  - Land: 35.28 sq mi (91.4 km^{2})
  - Water: 0.27 sq mi (0.70 km^{2})
- Elevation: 896 ft (273 m)

Population (2020)
  - Total: 1,413
  - Density: 41/sq mi (16/km^{2})
- Time zone: UTC-5 (Eastern (EST))
  - Summer (DST): UTC-4 (EDT)
- GNIS feature ID: 1928197

Cologne Magisterial District is one of ten magisterial districts in Mason County, West Virginia, United States. The district was originally established as a civil township in 1863, and converted into a magisterial district in 1872. In 2020, Cologne District was home to 1,413 people.

== Geography ==
Cologne District is located in the eastern part of Mason County, between the Kanawha River and the Ohio. To the northwest, it is bounded by Cooper District, to the southwest by the Kanawha River, to the southeast by Union District and to the northeast, by the Western District of Jackson County, formerly by Union District. To the southwest across the Kanawha is Arbuckle District in Mason County. The district's northernmost corner is a point on the Ohio River, where Cooper and Cologne Districts intersect with the westernmost corner of Jackson County. Across the Ohio to the north is Letart Township in Meigs County, Ohio.

At thirty-five and a half square miles, Cologne is the sixth-largest of Mason County's ten magisterial districts, ahead of Lewis, Waggener, Graham, and Robinson. The entire district is hilly, except for narrow bottoms along the Kanawha River and Tenmile and Thirteenmile Creeks. The soil over most of the district is a mixture of red, white, and yellow clay, while the bottomlands feature a sandy loam. The district was densely forested before the Civil War, but over the next twenty years nearly all of the timber was cut for railroad ties and staves. Building stone was quarried extensively from the hills overlooking the Kanawha, while coal, iron ore, and limestone were discovered.

The main streams of Cologne District are Tenmile and Thirteenmile Creeks. The main branch of the Kanawha Tenmile forms the northwestern boundary of the district, from some of the steepest terrain in the county down to the Kanawha River, ten miles above the river's mouth at Point Pleasant. The Cooper Branch is Tenmile's largest tributary in Cologne District; other branches, including the Lick Fork, Kings Branch, and Shade Fork are in Cooper District. Thirteenmile Creek arises in Jackson County, and meanders through Union District in Mason County, before turning north and entering Cologne District, then emptying into the Kanawha at Leon. Most of the branches of Thirteenmile are in Union District, but the Poplar Fork forms part of the boundary between Cologne and Union. In the northern part of the district are the upper waters of Little Mill Creek, which flows eastward into Jackson County, before joining the Ohio at Millwood, and Huff Run, a tributary of Little Mill Creek. The upper courses of both the Right Hand and Left Hand Forks of Cow Run, a tributary of Mill Creek in Jackson County, both arise in Cologne District. A portion of Tombleson Run, which empties into the Ohio River above Letart, passes through the northwestern part of the district.

Leon is the only incorporated community in Cologne District. The town was laid out by Benjamin Byram in 1840, and incorporated in 1872. It was the site of the Cologne Post Office (Note: It's unclear whether "Cologne" was also the original name of Leon, as implied by some sources; the town was certainly called "Leon" by 1862.) from 1853 to 1880, when the post office was renamed "Leon". A handful of unincorporated settlements are located in the hills, including Baden, Chestnut, and Rollins. Baden, in the eastern part of the district, was the site of a post office from 1888 to 1909. Chestnut, located along Chestnut Ridge in the northern part of the district, was the site of a post office from 1899 to 1908. On an upper branch of Tenmile Creek, Rollins hosted a post office from 1883 to 1909.

The main highways in Cologne District are West Virginia Route 2, which passes through the northern part of the district as it runs from Point Pleasant to Ravenswood in Jackson County, and West Virginia Route 62, which runs along the Kanawha River between Point Pleasant and Buffalo, in Putnam County, then follows the Ohio River north from Point Pleasant, passing through Cologne District again at its northern end, and joining Route 2 at Mount Alto in Jackson County. Other important roads include West Virginia Route 87, locally known as Evans Road, which travels southeast from Route 2 at Chestnut to Baden, before turning eastward and continuing to Evans in Jackson County; and Leon-Baden Road, which runs northeast from Leon to Baden in the interior of the district.

The Kanawha River Railroad operates travels through the Kanawha Valley in the southwestern part of Cologne District. Leasing its lines from Norfolk Southern, the railway carries freight from southeastern West Virginia to central Ohio. This line was originally part of the Kanawha and Michigan Railroad. A second line, originally part of the Baltimore and Ohio Railroad, and now part of CSX, follows the course of the Ohio River for the length of the county, traveling through the northern part of Cologne District on its way from Huntington to Parkersburg. Until the twentieth century, a ferry operated between Leon and the south shore of the Kanawha.

== History ==
Historical population
Census	Pop.	Note	%±
1870	1,023		—
1880	1,350		32.0%
1890	1,635		21.1%
1900	1,760		7.6%
1910	1,567		−11.0%
1920	1,605		2.4%
1930	1,415		−11.8%
1940	1,452		2.6%
1950	1,330		−8.4%
1960	1,135		−14.7%
1970	1,155		1.8%
1980	1,246		7.9%
1990	1,210		−2.9%
2000	1,247		3.1%
2010	1,459		17.0%
2020	1,413		−3.2%
United States Census Bureau, U.S. Decennial Census, 1870–2020.

There were no permanent settlements in Cologne District until after the Treaty of Greenville was signed in 1795, effectively ending the threat of Indian raids in the Ohio Valley. In 1797, John Greenlee, a blacksmith, was the first to establish his homestead: a cabin on the banks of the Kanawha River, half a mile below the mouth of Thirteenmile Creek. His son William was the first European settler born within the boundaries of Cologne. In 1798, John Nelson built a house on Thirteenmile, at the present site of Leon. Two years later, Jackson McCoy settled on the Coopers Branch of Tenmile Creek. Other pioneers included William Greenlee, John Allen, William Allen, and Tiberius Miller. William Arbuckle and his associates sank a salt well at the mouth of Thirteenmile Creek in 1818, operating it until 1821. A steam-powered grist mill was built nearby in 1830, followed by the district's first sawmill in 1831. Allen Young was the first schoolteacher, teaching out of a log cabin in 1828. Early ministers included William George, a Baptist, and Burwell Spurlock and Francis Guthrie, Methodists.

After West Virginia gained its independence from Virginia in 1863, the legislature enacted a law requiring the counties to be divided into civil townships. Mason County was divided into ten townships, each of which was named after a pioneer settler of Mason County. Cologne Township was originally named in honor of Thomas Lemaster, an early settler of the county, but in 1864 (Note: "At a meeting of the Board of Education, and the voters of Lemaster Township, held on Saturday, 27th of August, 1864, it was . . . Resolved, that we petition the Board of Supervisors, to change the name of this Township, from Lemaster to Cologne.") it was renamed "Cologne". Like the other townships, Cologne was converted into a magisterial district in 1872. It is the only Cologne District in the state.
