= Mason County, West Virginia =

County in West Virginia, United States

- County
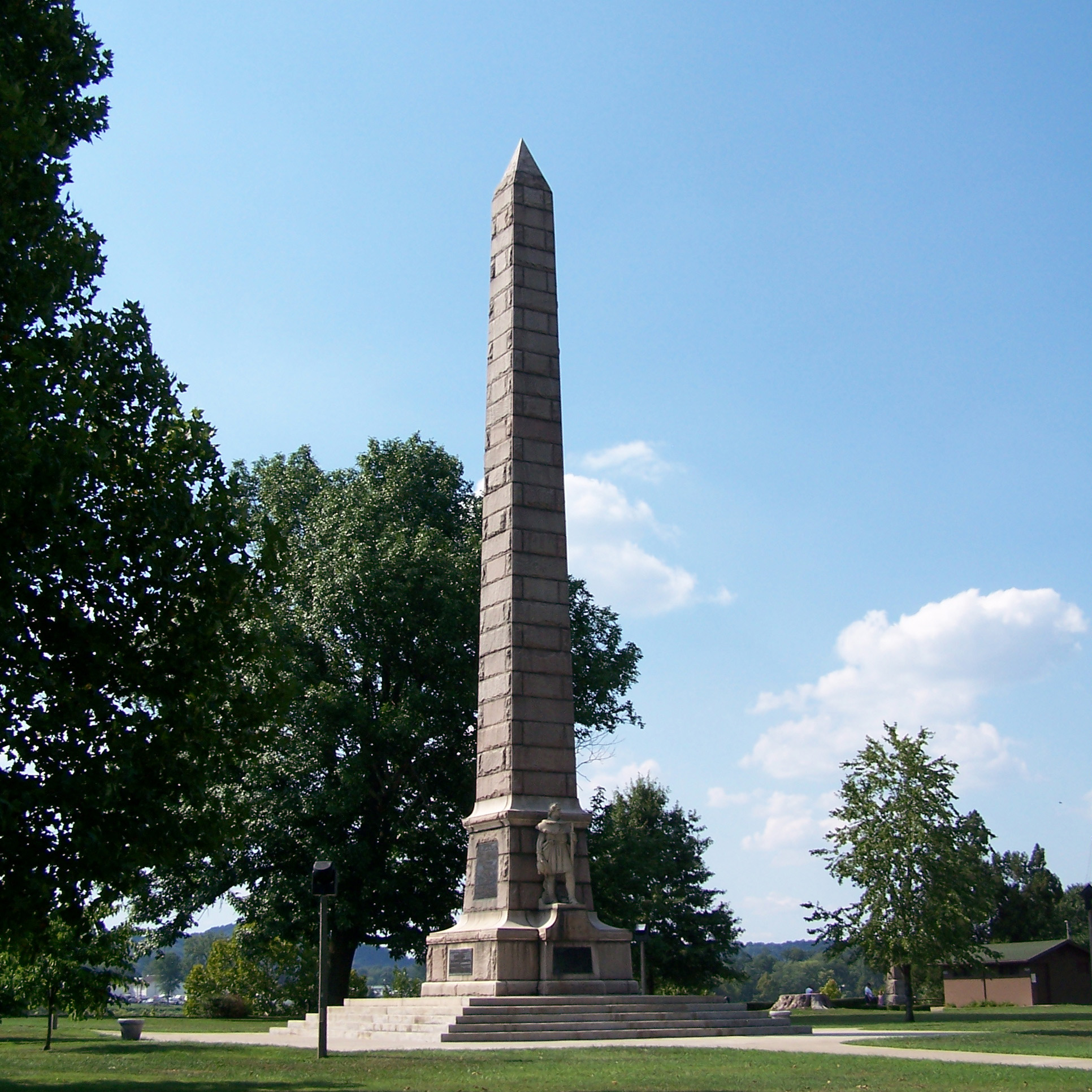
- Tu-Endie-Wei State Park

- Logo

- Location within the U.S. state of West Virginia
- Coordinates: 38°46′N 82°01′W
- Country: United States
- State: West Virginia
- Founded: January 2, 1804
- Seat: Point Pleasant
- Largest city: Point Pleasant

Area
  - Total: 445 sq mi (1,150 km^{2})
  - Land: 431 sq mi (1,120 km^{2})
  - Water: 14 sq mi (36 km^{2}) 3.1%

Population (2020)
  - Total: 25,453
  - Estimate (2025): 24,707 ▼
  - Density: 59.1/sq mi (22.8/km^{2})
- Time zone: UTC−5 (Eastern)
  - Summer (DST): UTC−4 (EDT)
- Congressional district: 1st
- Website: masoncountywv.gov

Mason County is a county in the U.S. state of West Virginia. As of the 2020 census, the population was 25,453. Its county seat and largest city is Point Pleasant. The county was founded in 1804 and named for George Mason, delegate to the U.S. Constitutional Convention. Before the Civil War, the county was in the State of Virginia.

Mason County is part of the Point Pleasant, WV-OH Micropolitan Statistical Area.

== History ==
In the second half of 1749, the French explorer, Pierre Joseph Céloron de Blainville, claimed French sovereignty over the Ohio Valley, burying a lead plaque at the meeting point of the Ohio and Kanawha Rivers, naming the place Point Pleasant.

In the Battle of Point Pleasant (October 10, 1774), fought on the future site of the town, over one thousand Virginia militiamen, led by Colonel Andrew Lewis (1720–1781), defeated a roughly equal force of an Algonquin confederation of Shawnee and Mingo warriors led by Shawnee Chief Cornstalk (ca. 1720–1777). The event is celebrated locally as the "First Battle of the American Revolutionary War" and in 1908 the U.S. Senate authorized erection of a local monument to commemorate it as such. Most historians, however, regard it not as a battle of the Revolution (1775–1783), but as a part of Lord Dunmore's War (1774). White settlers may have established their permanent settlement by 1774, for Col. Lewis had established "Camp Point Pleasant" at the time of the Battle and the settlement that followed also took that name.

According to Hardesty's West Virginia Counties (1883), regarding the first white settlers in Mason County south of Point Pleasant:

All that part of the district lying on the Ohio river bottoms above Eighteen-mile Creek, was included in the grant made by Congress to the heirs of General Mercer, who was killed at the battle of Princeton, New Jersey, January 3, 1777, while fighting by the side of Washington; hence the name Mercer Bottom. Who located and surveyed the lands cannot now be learned, but his grandson, Charles Fenton Mercer, of Virginia, afterward put the lands in market and sold them in quantities to suit purchasers. Thomas Hannan, whose name is preserved in that of the district, was the first actual settler – locating in the year 1790. Andrew Fleming and a Mr. Mercer, two hunters, had previously erected a cabin on the land which he purchased, and this was occupied by him until he could build a better one. Soon Jesse George purchased seventy acres of land at the mouth of Flatfoot Creek ... and became the second actual settler. Then came John Hereford, Robert Hereford, Thomas Powell, Edward S. Menager, John Morris — who discovered the first salt water on Kanawha river — George Withers, Robert Cremeans, James George, Rev. John Canterbury ...

The settlement at Point Pleasant did not receive an official charter until 1794. The first road through what later became Mason County was laid out by Thomas Hannan (1757–1835) in 1798 under contract to the federal government. It traversed the distance from present-day St Albans, (West) Virginia to Chillicothe, Ohio. This road (parts are still known as "Hannan Trace Road") is one of the oldest roads in Ohio. It became a main highway connecting Chillicothe and points east during the time when that settlement served as the capital of the Northwest Territory and the first capital of Ohio.

The Virginia General Assembly officially created Mason County from Kanawha County on January 2, 1804. It was named for George Mason IV (1725–1792), known as the "Father of the United States Bill of Rights" and a Founding Father of the United States. By 1810, the total county population stood at almost two thousand people. Before the American Civil War it developed as a river port (farmers upstream on the Kanawha River could ship their goods to Point Pleasant and from there down the Ohio River and sometimes the Mississippi River to market) as well as coal.

In the Virginia Secession Convention of 1861, Mason County's delegate, lawyer James H. Couch (1821–1899), although a slaveholder, voted against secession. Mason County then sent no delegates to the Virginia House of Delegates until West Virginia's statehood, which Virginia's House of Delegates refused to recognize, thus seating James Hutcheson who had been elected by Confederate soldiers in their camp. Meanwhile, William W. Newman claimed to represent Mason as well as nearby Jackson, Cabell, Wayne and Wirt counties throughout the war. Mason County sent more than 1000 men to the Union army and one company of 61 men to the Confederate Army (the 37th Virginia Infantry). In March 1863, in the only wartime skirmish in Mason County, during the Jones-Imboden Raid, the 6th Virginia Cavalry and 8th Virginia Cavalry attacked the Mason County Courthouse, where they believed munitions stored, leaving bullet holes in the walls until a replacement was built in 1954.

Point Pleasant's Battle Monument State Park, also known as Tu-Endie-Wei, was dedicated on October 10, 1901, to commemorate the Battle of Point Pleasant, at the time claimed to have been the first battle of the Revolutionary War. It significantly predates the 1928 establishment of the West Virginia state park system. The park includes the tavern begun in 1796 by Walter Newman, later operated as a museum of local history by the Daughters of the American Revolution.

The Marietta Manufacturing Company (shipbuilders) moved to Point Pleasant in 1915; the facility continued to build mine-planting vessels and other small ships through World War II, but closed in 1970. During World War II the West Virginia Ordnance Works manufactured TNT in Mason County about 5 miles north of Point Pleasant; it was later repurposed as the McClintic Wildlife Management Area as well as an industrial park. The county's worst disaster occurred on December 15, 1967, when the Silver Bridge, a link-suspension bridge which had connected Point Pleasant to Kanauga, Ohio along U.S. Route 35 since 1928, collapsed during the rush hour commute. The disaster killed 46 people and injured nine others, and drew attention to poor bridge maintenance practices, as well as bridge loads greatly exceeding their original tolerances. The important bridge was replaced two years later by the Silver Memorial Bridge, which stands today.

In 1981, the West Virginia Department of Agriculture acquired land that had been farmed after the Civil War by General John McCausland, the last fully confirmed Confederate general to die. Added to the National Register of Historic Places in 2003, it now operates as Smithland Farm. The River Museum opened on May 1, 2004, but closed in 2018 after a disastrous fire.

== Geography ==
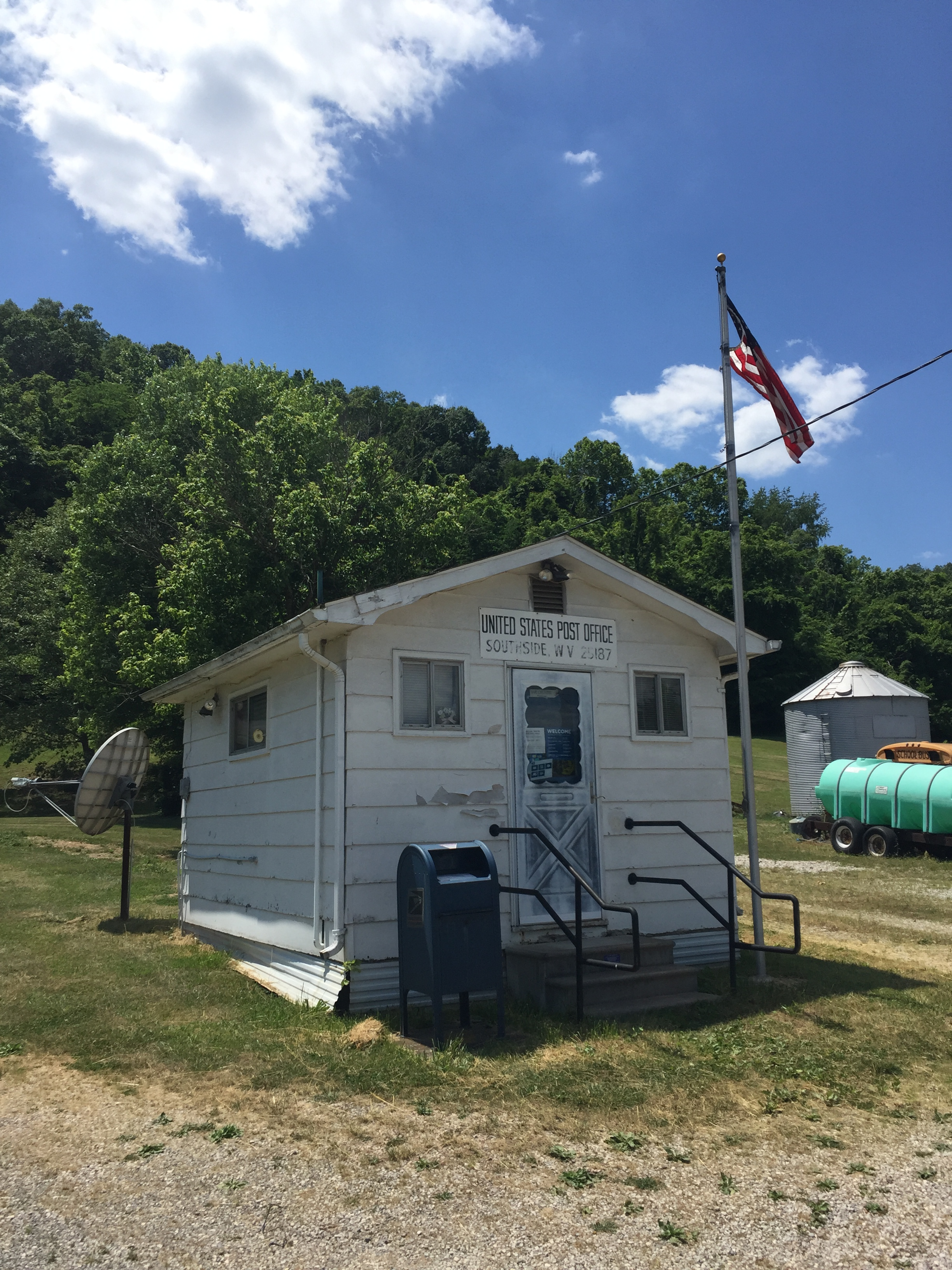
Post Office on U.S. Route 35 in Southside, West Virginia

According to the United States Census Bureau, the county has a total area of 445 square miles (1,150 km^{2}), of which 431 square miles (1,120 km^{2}) is land and 14 square miles (36 km^{2}) (3.1%) is water.

=== Territorial evolution ===
Prior to its establishment in 1804, the land that would become Mason County was part of the vast and largely unorganized territory claimed by Virginia west of the Alleghenies. It was attached to various counties beginning with Orange in 1734, Augusta in 1738, and Botetourt in 1770. Beginning in 1772, the portion of Mason County south of the Kanawha River was part of Fincastle County, the West Virginia portion of which became Monroe County in 1777. The remaining West Virginia portion of Botetourt County, including the northern part of present-day Mason County, became Greenbrier County in 1778. In 1789, the western portions of Greenbrier and Monroe Counties, extending to the Ohio and Big Sandy Rivers, were combined to form Kanawha County.

Mason County was separated from Kanawha County in 1804, including all of its current territory, as well as portions of what are now Jackson, Putnam, and Roane Counties. The northern and western boundaries were formed by the Ohio River, and the county's southwestern boundary, originally with Kanawha County, and now with Cabell, remains unchanged. Until 1831, Mason County shared a boundary with Wood County, running southeasterly from the Ohio River north of Ravenswood to the northwestern boundary of Kanawha County, thence in a southwesterly direction to the present border with Cabell County. The formation of Jackson County in 1831 from portions of Mason, Wood, and Kanawha Counties removed the eastern portion of Mason County, including the part now in Roane County, while the formation of Putnam County from portions of Mason, Cabell, and Kanawha Counties in 1848 removed the southeastern portion of the county. This was the last major change (Note: Minor adjustments have occurred since 1848, including in 1866, when a small portion of eastern Mason County was attached to Jackson County.) to Mason County's boundaries.

After West Virginia gained its independence from Virginia in 1863, the state's counties were divided into civil townships, with the goal of placing authority in the hands of local governments. Mason County was divided into ten townships, each of which was named after a pioneer settler (Note: Two of the townships were soon renamed: Lemaster Township became Cologne, and Van Bibber Township became Union.) of Mason County. However, township government proved impractical across the heavily rural state, with citizens unable to meet on a regular basis, and inadequate tax revenue to meet township responsibilities. Following the adoption of the Constitution of West Virginia in 1872, the townships were converted into magisterial districts, and the county courts (later county commissions) empowered to establish, consolidate, or otherwise modify them.

=== Major highways ===
- U.S. Route 35
- West Virginia Route 2
- West Virginia Route 62
- West Virginia Route 87
- West Virginia Route 817

=== Adjacent counties ===
- Meigs County, Ohio (north)
- Jackson County (east)
- Putnam County (southeast)
- Cabell County (southwest)
- Gallia County, Ohio (west)

=== National protected area ===
- Ohio River Islands National Wildlife Refuge (part)

== Demographics ==
Historical population
Census	Pop.	Note	%±
1810	1,991		—
1820	4,868		144.5%
1830	6,534		34.2%
1840	6,777		3.7%
1850	7,539		11.2%
1860	9,173		21.7%
1870	15,978		74.2%
1880	22,293		39.5%
1890	22,863		2.6%
1900	24,142		5.6%
1910	23,019		−4.7%
1920	21,459		−6.8%
1930	20,788		−3.1%
1940	22,270		7.1%
1950	23,537		5.7%
1960	24,459		3.9%
1970	24,306		−0.6%
1980	27,045		11.3%
1990	25,178		−6.9%
2000	25,957		3.1%
2010	27,324		5.3%
2020	25,453		−6.8%
2025 (est.)	24,707	▼	−2.9%
U.S. Decennial Census; 1790–1960 1900–1990; 1990–2000 2010–2020

=== 2020 census ===
As of the 2020 census, the county had a population of 25,453. Of the residents, 20.6% were under the age of 18 and 21.7% were 65 years of age or older; the median age was 44.7 years. For every 100 females there were 93.0 males, and for every 100 females age 18 and over there were 88.6 males.

The racial makeup of the county was 95.9% White, 0.8% Black or African American, 0.2% American Indian and Alaska Native, 0.3% Asian, 0.2% from some other race, and 2.7% from two or more races. Hispanic or Latino residents of any race comprised 0.7% of the population.

There were 10,570 households in the county, of which 26.7% had children under the age of 18 living with them and 28.0% had a female householder with no spouse or partner present. About 31.0% of all households were made up of individuals and 15.7% had someone living alone who was 65 years of age or older.

There were 12,153 housing units, of which 13.0% were vacant. Among occupied housing units, 79.7% were owner-occupied and 20.3% were renter-occupied. The homeowner vacancy rate was 1.6% and the rental vacancy rate was 7.9%.

Mason County, West Virginia – Racial and ethnic composition Note: the US Census treats Hispanic/Latino as an ethnic category. This table excludes Latinos from the racial categories and assigns them to a separate category. Hispanics/Latinos may be of any race.
Race / Ethnicity (NH = Non-Hispanic)	Pop 2000	Pop 2010	Pop 2020	% 2000	% 2010	% 2020
White alone (NH)	25,441	26,618	24,322	98.01%	97.41%	95.55%
Black or African American alone (NH)	129	171	193	0.49%	0.62%	0.75%
Native American or Alaska Native alone (NH)	43	39	32	0.16%	0.14%	0.12%
Asian alone (NH)	71	89	74	0.27%	0.32%	0.29%
Pacific Islander alone (NH)	1	12	5	0.00%	0.04%	0.01%
Other race alone (NH)	8	10	20	0.03%	0.03%	0.07%
Mixed race or Multiracial (NH)	143	266	637	0.55%	0.97%	2.50%
Hispanic or Latino (any race)	121	119	170	0.46%	0.43%	0.66%
Total	25,957	27,324	25,453	100.00%	100.00%	100.00%

=== 2010 census ===
As of the census of 2010, there were 27,324 people, 11,149 households, and 7,649 families residing in the county. The population density was 63.4 inhabitants per square mile (24.5/km^{2}). There were 13,006 housing units at an average density of 30.2 units per square mile (11.7 units/km^{2}). The racial makeup of the county was 97.7% white, 0.6% black or African American, 0.3% Asian, 0.2% American Indian, 0.1% from other races, and 1.0% from two or more races. Those of Hispanic or Latino origin made up 0.4% of the population. In terms of ancestry, 19.4% were German, 11.3% were Irish, 11.2% were American, and 7.6% were English.

Of the 11,149 households, 29.8% had children under the age of 18 living with them, 52.5% were married couples living together, 11.6% had a female householder with no husband present, 31.4% were non-families, and 27.4% of all households were made up of individuals. The average household size was 2.39 and the average family size was 2.89. The median age was 42.4 years.

The median income for a household in the county was $36,027 and the median income for a family was $42,054. Males had a median income of $41,607 versus $25,444 for females. The per capita income for the county was $19,609. About 14.6% of families and 18.9% of the population were below the poverty line, including 27.3% of those under age 18 and 10.2% of those age 65 or over.

=== 2000 census ===
As of the census of 2000, there were 25,957 people, 10,587 households, and 7,569 families residing in the county. The population density was 60 inhabitants per square mile (23/km^{2}). There were 12,056 housing units at an average density of 28 units per square mile (11 units/km^{2}). The racial makeup of the county was 98.37% White, 0.50% Black or African American, 0.18% Native American, 0.27% Asian, 0.01% Pacific Islander, 0.11% from other races, and 0.56% from two or more races. 0.47% of the population were Hispanic or Latino of any race.

There were 10,587 households, out of which 30.60% had children under the age of 18 living with them, 57.60% were married couples living together, 10.10% had a female householder with no husband present, and 28.50% were non-families. 25.50% of all households were made up of individuals, and 11.50% had someone living alone who was 65 years of age or older. The average household size was 2.42 and the average family size was 2.89.

In the county, the population was spread out, with 22.70% under the age of 18, 8.30% from 18 to 24, 27.70% from 25 to 44, 26.10% from 45 to 64, and 15.20% who were 65 years of age or older. The median age was 40 years. For every 100 females, there were 96.20 males. For every 100 females age 18 and over, there were 92.10 males.

The median income for a household in the county was $27,134, and the median income for a family was $32,953. Males had a median income of $32,382 versus $17,074 for females. The per capita income for the county was $14,804. About 16.60% of families and 19.90% of the population were below the poverty line, including 27.30% of those under age 18 and 14.50% of those age 65 or over.

== Politics ==
United States presidential election results for Mason County, West Virginia
Year	Republican		Democratic		Third party(ies)	
Year	No.	%	No.	%	No.	%
1912	1,024	21.45%	1,812	37.95%	1,939	40.61%
1916	2,454	50.17%	2,336	47.76%	101	2.07%
1920	4,912	59.88%	3,177	38.73%	114	1.39%
1924	4,225	52.22%	3,308	40.89%	557	6.89%
1928	5,125	64.13%	2,814	35.21%	53	0.66%
1932	4,655	47.70%	5,027	51.52%	76	0.78%
1936	5,894	54.67%	4,852	45.00%	36	0.33%
1940	6,239	57.98%	4,521	42.02%	0	0.00%
1944	5,609	60.50%	3,662	39.50%	0	0.00%
1948	5,453	57.45%	4,038	42.55%	0	0.00%
1952	6,102	61.47%	3,824	38.53%	0	0.00%
1956	6,306	62.59%	3,769	37.41%	0	0.00%
1960	6,424	58.69%	4,522	41.31%	0	0.00%
1964	4,467	40.69%	6,511	59.31%	0	0.00%
1968	5,208	48.97%	4,549	42.77%	879	8.26%
1972	7,129	64.01%	4,008	35.99%	0	0.00%
1976	5,205	43.47%	6,769	56.53%	0	0.00%
1980	6,040	49.88%	5,683	46.94%	385	3.18%
1984	6,648	53.64%	5,701	46.00%	44	0.36%
1988	5,332	49.26%	5,468	50.51%	25	0.23%
1992	3,808	34.00%	5,331	47.60%	2,061	18.40%
1996	3,581	34.32%	5,284	50.65%	1,568	15.03%
2000	5,972	53.21%	4,963	44.22%	288	2.57%
2004	6,487	54.10%	5,408	45.10%	95	0.79%
2008	5,853	55.20%	4,484	42.29%	266	2.51%
2012	5,741	58.64%	3,778	38.59%	271	2.77%
2016	7,654	74.54%	2,081	20.26%	534	5.20%
2020	8,491	75.77%	2,526	22.54%	189	1.69%
2024	8,232	78.05%	2,111	20.02%	204	1.93%

== Education ==
Steamboat visit at county seat.

Mason County Schools operates public schools. There are three junior/senior high schools, seven elementary schools and one primary school in Mason County.

- Point Pleasant Primary School
- Ashton Elementary School
- Beale Elementary School
- Leon Elementary School
- Mason Elementary School
- Point Pleasant Intermediate School
- Roosevelt Elementary School
- Hannan Junior/Senior High School
- Point Pleasant Junior/Senior High School
- Wahama Junior/Senior High School
- New Haven Elementary School

== Mason County Fair ==
The Mason County Fair, held at the Mason County Fair Grounds in Point Pleasant, is the largest county fair in West Virginia (in terms of attendance). It is held every year during the first week of August.

== Communities ==
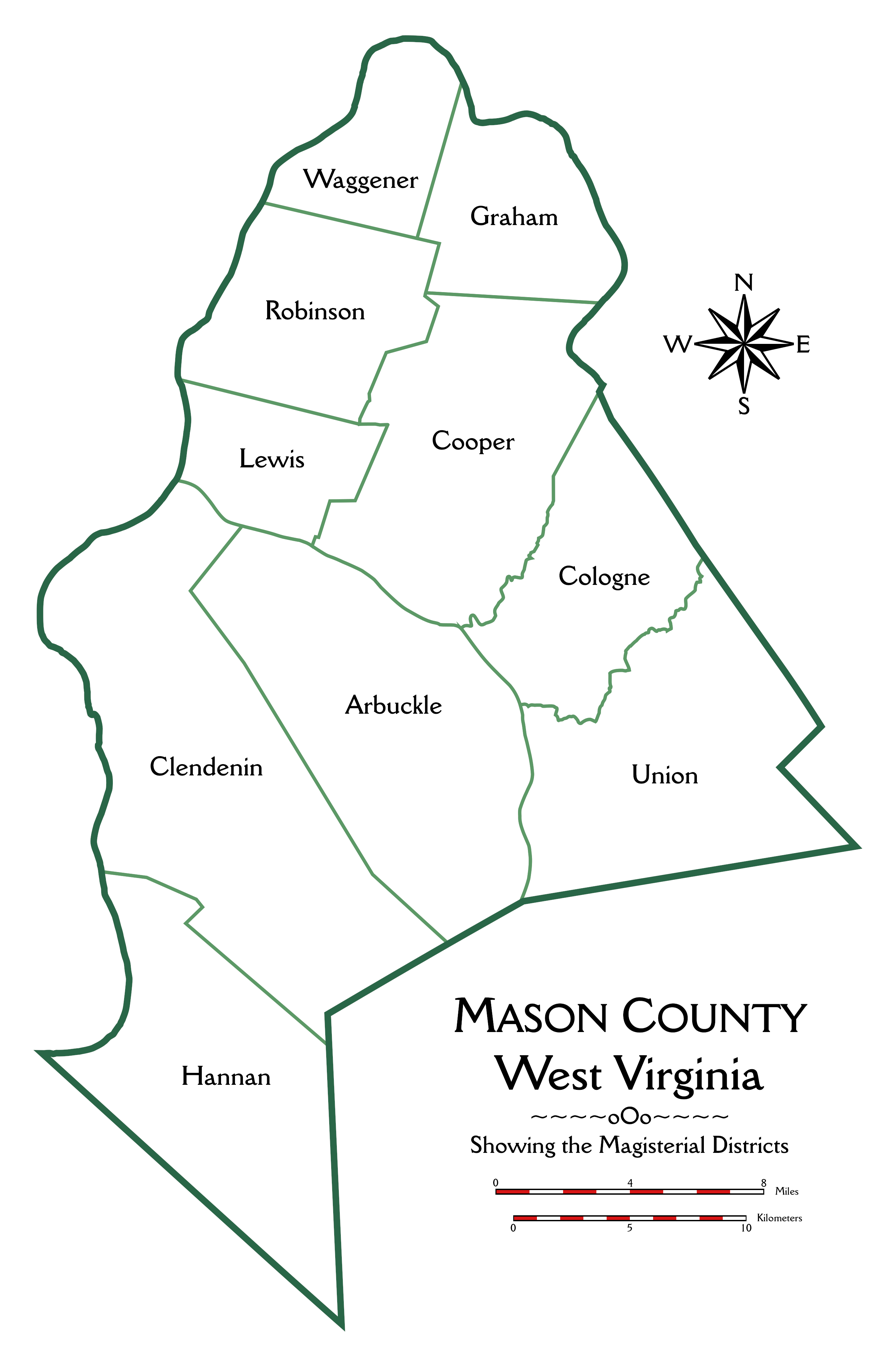
Mason County, West Virginia, showing the magisterial districts.

=== City ===
- Point Pleasant (county seat)

=== Towns ===
- Hartford City
- Leon
- Mason
- New Haven

=== Magisterial districts ===
- Arbuckle
- Clendenin
- Cologne
- Cooper
- Graham
- Hannan
- Lewis
- Robinson
- Union
- Waggener

=== Census-designated places ===
- Apple Grove
- Clifton
- Gallipolis Ferry

=== Unincorporated communities ===
- Ambrosia
- Arbuckle
- Arlee
- Ash
- Ashton
- Baden
- Beale
- Beech Hill
- Ben Lomond
- Capehart
- Condee
- Couch
- Deerlick
- Elmwood
- Fairview
- Flat Rock
- Glenwood
- Graham Station
- Greer
- Grimms Landing
- Gunville
- Henderson
- Hogsett
- Lakin
- Letart
- Maggie
- Mercers Bottom
- Mount Olive
- Nat
- Pondlick
- Rayburn
- Sassafras
- Southside
- Spilman
- Tribble
- Upland
- Waterloo
- West Columbia
- Wood
- Wyoma

== Notable people ==
- Gus Douglass, longtime commissioner of the West Virginia Department of Agriculture
- Michael Joseph Owens, inventor of machine which automated the production of glass bottles

== In popular culture ==
Mason County is the primary setting of the analog horror web series Local 58, created by Kris Straub.

== See also ==
- Chief Cornstalk Wildlife Management Area
- County (United States)
- Green Bottom Wildlife Management Area
- Kanawha River
- National Register of Historic Places listings in Mason County, West Virginia
- Ohio River
- Tu-Endie-Wei State Park
