= Mercers Bottom, West Virginia =

- Unincorporated community
- Location within West Virginia Location within the United States
- Coordinates: 38°38′41″N 82°09′45″W
- Country: United States
- State: West Virginia
- County: Mason
- Elevation: 584 ft (178 m)
- Time zone: UTC-5 (Eastern (EST))
  - Summer (DST): UTC-4 (EDT)
- Area codes: 304 & 681
- GNIS feature ID: 1552054

Mercers Bottom is an unincorporated community in Mason County, West Virginia, United States. It is situated on the east bank of the Ohio River along West Virginia Route 2, some 13.5 miles (21.7 km) south of Point Pleasant.

== Geography ==
The name "Mercer's Bottom" originally designated a much larger area than today. On modern maps, it generally occupies a two-mile stretch of Route 2 between Apple Grove (on the north) and Ashton (on the south).

== History ==
Mercers Bottom is named for the celebrated Revolutionary War General Hugh Mercer (1726–1777) who (posthumously) received a large land grant here for his services. The 16,000-acre tract was surveyed by order of George Washington for the General's heirs.

According to Hardesty's West Virginia Counties (1883):

All that part of the district lying on the Ohio river bottoms above Eighteen-mile Creek, was included in the grant made by Congress to the heirs of General Mercer, who was killed at the battle of Princeton, New Jersey, January 3, 1777, while fighting by the side of Washington; hence the name Mercer Bottom. Who located and surveyed the lands cannot now be learned, but his grandson, Charles Fenton Mercer, of Virginia, afterward put the lands in market and sold them in quantities to suit purchasers. Thomas Hannan, whose name is preserved in that of the district, was the first actual settler - locating in the year 1790. Andrew Fleming and a Mr. Mercer, two hunters, had previously erected a cabin on the land which he purchased, and this was occupied by him until he could build a better one. Soon Jesse George purchased seventy acres of land at the mouth of Flatfoot Creek ... and became the second actual settler. Then came John Hereford, Robert Hereford, Thomas Powell, Edward S. Menager, John Morris — who discovered the first salt water on Kanawha river — George Withers, Robert Cremeans, James George, Rev. John Canterbury ...

Nearby are the graves of such early settlers as Adjutant John Hereford and Ensign John Wilson, both soldiers in Washington's Revolutionary Army. Hereford was adjutant in Col. John Alexander's Virginia Regiment under Lafayette at the Battle of Yorktown. Born in Fairfax County, Virginia in 1758, Hereford moved to Mercers Bottom in 1808, served as magistrate and sheriff, and died there in 1846.
