= Robinson District, Mason County, West Virginia =

- Magisterial district
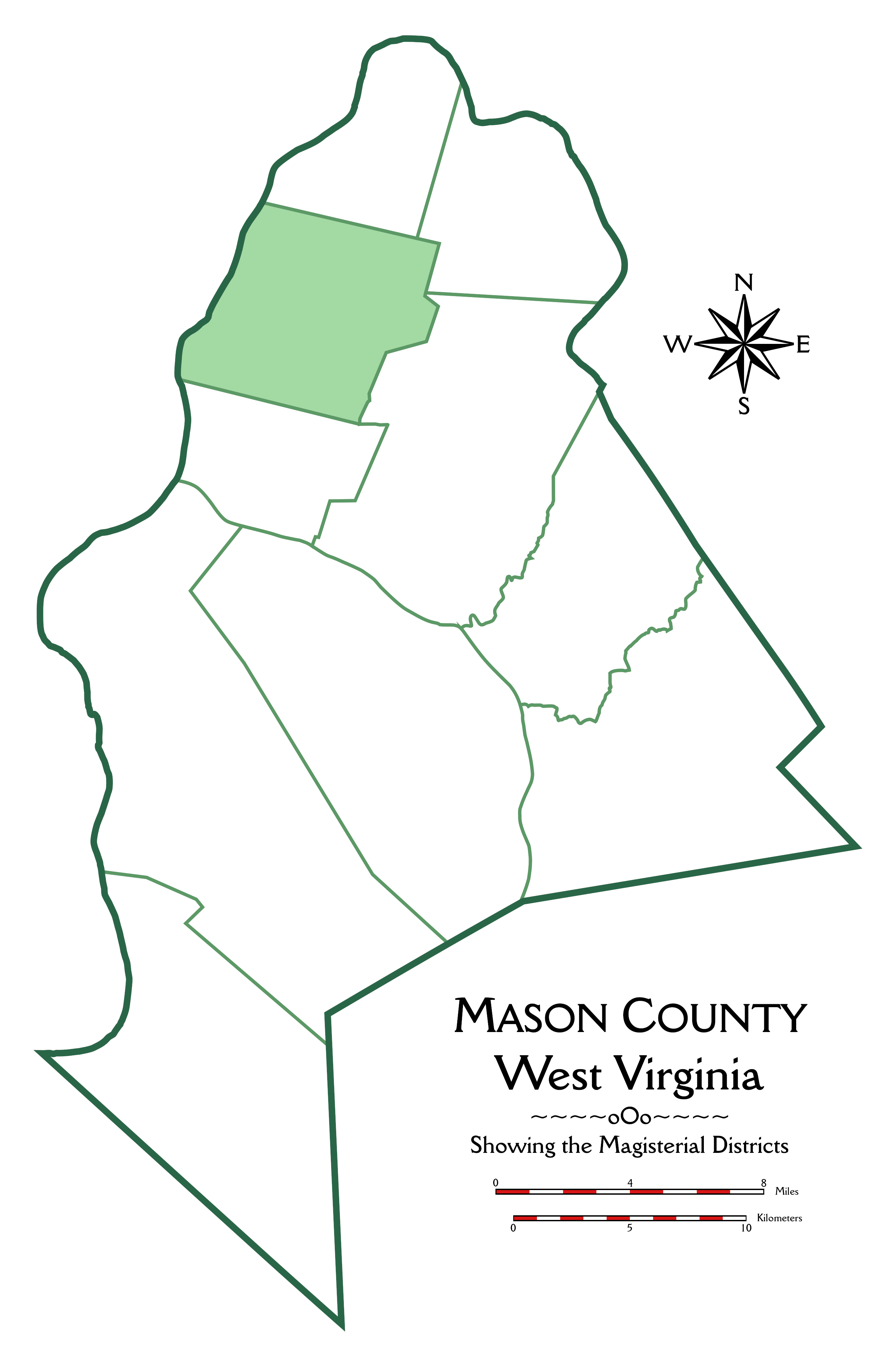
- Location of Robinson District in Mason County
- Coordinates: 38°54′39″N 82°04′14″W
- Country: United States
- State: West Virginia
- County: Mason
- Established: 1863
- Named for: Isaac Robinson

Area
  - Total: 33.36 sq mi (86.4 km^{2})
  - Land: 31.98 sq mi (82.8 km^{2})
  - Water: 1.39 sq mi (3.6 km^{2})
- Elevation: 584 ft (178 m)

Population (2020)
  - Total: 3,166
  - Density: 97/sq mi (37/km^{2})
- Time zone: UTC-5 (Eastern (EST))
  - Summer (DST): UTC-4 (EDT)
- GNIS feature ID: 1928346

Robinson Magisterial District is one of ten magisterial districts in Mason County, West Virginia, United States. The district was originally established as a civil township in 1863, and converted into a magisterial district in 1872. In 2020, Robinson District was home to 3,166 people.

== Geography ==
Robinson District is located along the Ohio River in the northern part of Mason County. To the north, it is bounded by Waggener District, to the northeast by Graham, to the east by Cooper, to the south by Lewis, and to the west by the Ohio River. Across the river are Cheshire and Addison Townships in Gallia County, Ohio. The district includes Eightmile Island, a half-mile long island in the Ohio River opposite Cheshire, Ohio.

At just over thirty-three square miles, Robinson is the seventh-largest of Mason County's ten magisterial districts, ahead of Lewis, Waggener, and Graham. Unlike the rest of Mason County, which is primarily hilly, the western half of Robinson District is relatively level, most of which is concentrated in the area known as "Pleasant Flats". The district features rich soil for farming, and was famous for its wheat crop in the late nineteenth century.

The largest and most important of Robinson District's streams is Oldtown Creek, which flows through the district from east to west, before turning south and entering the Ohio River from the northwest corner of Lewis District. The headwaters of Oldtown Creek are in Cooper District, as are the upper waters of its largest tributary, Robinson Run, but the lower portion of Robinson Run is in Robinson District, including the lower portion of the Wolfpen Branch. Potter's Creek, in the northeastern part of Robinson District, joins Oldtown Creek about a mile below the mouth of Robinson Run, while Turkey Run, in the southern part of the district, joins Oldtown in its lower course. Other tributaries of Oldtown Creek in Robinson District include the Somerville Branch, Gibbs Creek, Hinkle's Branch, and the lower course of Rayburn Creek, which flows north out of Cooper District.

Besides Oldtown and its tributaries, Mill Run, (Note: Originally Watkins' Mill Branch, later Mill Creek; the name "Mill Run" is probably preferred to avoid confusion with Mill Creek and Little Mill Creek, which flow into the Ohio River from Jackson County.) flows eastward through the northwestern part of the district, and enters the Ohio below Eightmile Island; the headwaters of Ohio Tenmile Creek rise in the northeastern part, before flowing north into Waggener District; and the headwaters of Crooked Creek lie in the southern part of the district, before flowing south toward Point Pleasant in Lewis District.

There are no incorporated towns in Robinson District, except for the northernmost part of Point Pleasant, most of which is in Lewis District. Unincorporated communities include the villages of Lakin, Maggie, Sassafras, and York. Former settlements include Oldtown, on Pleasant Flats, and Heights, now incorporated into Point Pleasant.

The only highway in Robinson District is West Virginia Route 62, which runs from north to south, paralleling the river above Point Pleasant. Other important routes include Sand Hill Road, which crosses the county from east to west, from Letart to Point Pleasant, and Camp Conley Road, which runs through the southern part of Pleasant Flats, before entering the hills and meeting Sand Hill Road in the eastern part of the district. A railroad line, formerly part of the Baltimore and Ohio Railroad, now CSX Transportation, runs along the river between Point Pleasant and Parkersburg, and the Mason County Airport is located in the central part of Pleasant Flats.

Other features of note in Robinson District include the Clifton F. McClintic Wildlife Management Area, a 3,600-acre naturalized region occupying former agricultural and industrial land in the eastern part of Pleasant Flats, and reputedly the home of Mothman; the Mason County Fairgrounds; the West Virginia State Farm Museum, the Lakin Correctional Center and Jail; and the West Virginia National Guard Armory, all located on Pleasant Flats.

== History ==
Historical population
Census	Pop.	Note	%±
1870	1,145		—
1880	1,267		10.7%
1890	1,129		−10.9%
1900	1,014		−10.2%
1910	900		−11.2%
1920	915		1.7%
1930	1,400		53.0%
1940	1,622		15.9%
1950	1,773		9.3%
1960	2,027		14.3%
1970	1,858		−8.3%
1980	2,280		22.7%
1990	2,389		4.8%
2000	2,620		9.7%
2010	3,222		23.0%
2020	3,166		−1.7%
United States Census Bureau, U.S. Decennial Census, 1870–2020.

The land that would become Mason County, West Virginia was first surveyed in 1772 by a team led by George Washington. They surveyed a tract of 51,302 acres, just over eighty square miles, north of a line drawn between Letart Falls and the mouth of the Great Kanawha, including most of Robinson and Lewis Districts, along with all of Graham and Waggener. The land was patented to them on December 15, 1772, by Lord Dunmore, the royal governor of Virginia, on behalf of King George III. Most of Robinson District consists of tracts originally allocated to three of the surveyors: an 8,000-acre tract allocated to Adam Stephens, now in the northern portion of the district, and running from the Ohio River on the west, to the land surveyed for John Polson, now the western boundary of Graham District; immediately south of Stephens' portion, a 5,000-acre tract set aside for Peter Hog, who also claimed the 3,000 acres immediately north of Stephens; and on the southern end another tract of 5,000 acres allocated to George Muse, between the Ohio and the upper waters of the right-hand fork of Rayburn Creek. Together, these tracts account for 18,000 out of the roughly 21,350 currently estimated to lie in Robinson District. The balance consists of land added to the eastern end of Stephens' and Hog's surveys, to the west of Cooper District and the southern part of Graham District, including Sassafras on Upper Flats, and portions of Oldtown Creek and Robinson Run; as well as land submerged in the Ohio River, not included in the original survey, but reserved by Virginia when it ceded its claim to the Northwest Territory in 1784.

The first European settler in Robinson District was Isaac Robinson, whose cabin was built near the mouth of Mill Creek about 1792. His family was killed by the Wyandot, and he was taken captive. Adopted by an Indian family, he remained with the Wyandot for several years, before returning to his home in Virginia. More settlers arrived in 1797, including Jesse Bennett, William Hawkins, James Ball, and Zachariah Vansickle. A horse-powered grist mill was erected by Absalom Van Matre in 1800, and soon afterward, Peter Yeager built a sawmill. The first schoolteacher was Henry Van Matre, who taught out of a log cabin in 1803; a schoolhouse was built the following year. Bennett was the area's first physician; he would later become famous for having performed the first successful caesarian section in the United States. (Note: This occurred in 1794, while Bennett was a resident of Rockingham County, Virginia; but not thinking that his account would be believed, he did not publicize the event during his lifetime, and it became widely known only after his death. The operation was more remarkable because the patient was his own wife, who survived, along with their child; and it was performed in their home, a log cabin, by candlelight.) One of the other early settlers was frontier scout and Indian fighter Luman Gibbs, who at the age of sixteen in 1774, fought at the Battle of Point Pleasant.

A number of the early settlers of Robinson District would enlist in the militia company known as the "Mason County Riflemen" during the War of 1812. This company was led by Captain Anthony Vansickle, a resident of the district; Nicholas Yeager was lieutenant, and Jesse Bennett was appointed surgeon. The Riflemen marched to the Maumee River in northern Ohio, as part of the Second Virginia Regiment. At the Maumee rapids, they joined with the army commanded by future President William Henry Harrison, and participated in the construction of Fort Meigs.

After West Virginia gained its independence from Virginia in 1863, the legislature enacted a law requiring the counties to be divided into civil townships. Mason County was divided into ten townships, each of which was named after a pioneer settler of Mason County. Robinson Township was named in honor of Isaac Robinson, the first known settler of the area. Like the other townships, Robinson was converted into a magisterial district in 1872. It is the only Robinson District in the state.

At the beginning of the nineteenth century, much of Pleasant Flats was covered by swampland and marshes, and was useless for agriculture. Over the coming decades, the settlers built a series of drains to eliminate standing water, and make the soil tillable. The soil, nourished for ages as a wetland, was fertile and productive. In 1942, shortly after the United States entered World War II, the federal government purchased 8,323 acres of agricultural land in Robinson District, where it constructed the West Virginia Ordnance Works, a major munitions plant. In operation until 1945, the plant employed up to 3,500 people.

After the war, the ordnance plant was dismantled, the land cleared once again, and the area returned to civilian use. The Mason County Airport and an industrial park are located on the reclaimed land, but the majority became the McClintic Wildlife Management Area, a naturalized area of woods and wetlands, home to a wide variety of wildlife. Known locally as "the TNT Area", McClintic is open to the public for hiking, hunting, and fishing.
