= Graham District, Mason County, West Virginia =

- Magisterial district
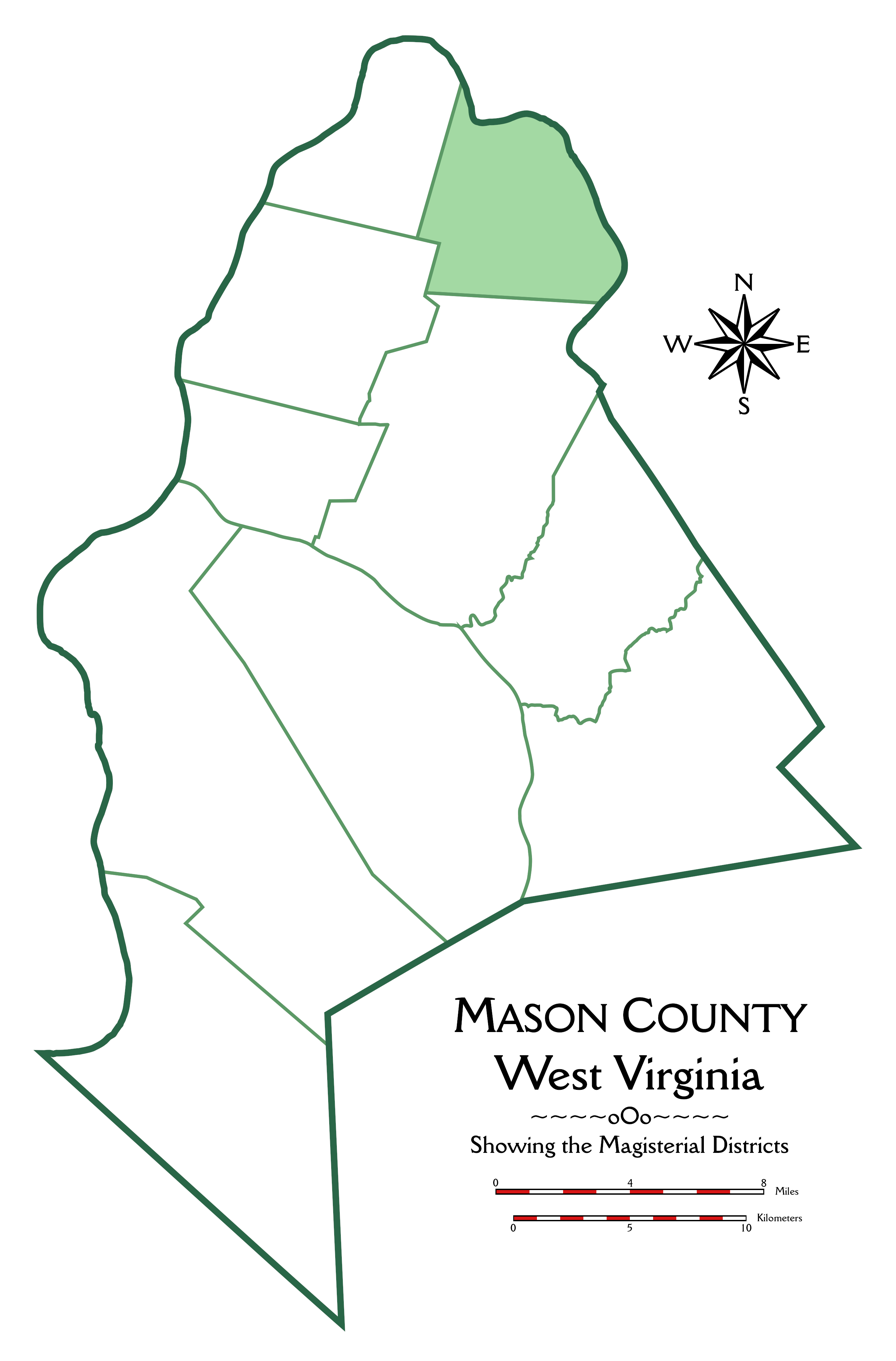
- Location of Graham District in Mason County
- Coordinates: 38°57′10″N 81°57′30″W
- Country: United States
- State: West Virginia
- County: Mason
- Established: 1863
- Named after: William Graham

Area
  - Total: 26.15 sq mi (67.7 km^{2})
  - Land: 24.5 sq mi (63 km^{2})
  - Water: 1.65 sq mi (4.3 km^{2})
- Elevation: 768 ft (234 m)

Population (2020)
  - Total: 2,618
  - Density: 105/sq mi (41/km^{2})
- Time zone: UTC-5 (Eastern (EST))
  - Summer (DST): UTC-4 (EDT)
- GNIS feature ID: 1928276

Graham Magisterial District is one of ten magisterial districts in Mason County, West Virginia, United States. The district was originally established as a civil township in 1863, and converted into a magisterial district in 1872. In 2020, Graham District was home to 2,618 people.

== Geography ==
Graham District is located on the western side of the Great Bend of the Ohio River, in the northern end of Mason County. It is bounded on the west by Waggener District, to the southwest by Robinson District, and to the south by Cooper District. Across the river to the southeast is Letart Township, and to the northeast Sutton Township, both in Meigs County, Ohio.

At just over twenty-six square miles, Graham District ranks eighth out of Mason County's ten magisterial districts in total area; the only districts smaller than Graham are Lewis and Waggener. Much of Graham District is hilly, but there are fertile bottom lands along the Ohio, while the central and southern portions of the district consist of a plateau known as "Upper Flats" or "Dutch Flats", covered by a thin layer of soil consisting of white clay. Thin coal seams run throughout the county, and there are abundant salt deposits along the river.

The main streams are West Creek, which flows northeast and empties into the Ohio River at Graham Station; Little Broad Run, which flows northward and meets the Ohio just above New Haven; and Big Broad Run, or just Broad Run, which flows north and enters the Ohio at New Haven. Lesser streams include Seaman Run, which flows northeast and joins Broad Run just south of New Haven; Twomile Creek, which flows northeast and joins the Ohio above Graham Station; and Sliding Hill Creek, (Note: Most of Sliding Hill Creek is in Graham District, but its mouth is just to the west in Waggener District. The older portion of Hartford is in Graham District, to the east; the western portion is in Waggener.) which flows northward into the Ohio at Hartford.

The only incorporated communities in Graham District are New Haven and Hartford, the western part of which lies in Waggener District. Unincorporated communities include Graham Station, Longdale, Vernon, Union, and White Church. The only highway in the district is West Virginia Route 62, which roughly parallels the Ohio River, follows the course of Pike Street in Hartford and Fifth Street in New Haven, and is known locally as Graham Station Road above New Haven.

== History ==
Historical population
Census	Pop.	Note	%±
1870	2,325		—
1880	2,260		−2.8%
1890	2,124		−6.0%
1900	1,987		−6.5%
1910	1,780		−10.4%
1920	1,703		−4.3%
1930	1,739		2.1%
1940	1,872		7.6%
1950	2,313		23.6%
1960	2,520		8.9%
1970	2,651		5.2%
1980	2,938		10.8%
1990	2,781		−5.3%
2000	2,774		−0.3%
2010	2,756		−0.6%
2020	2,618		−5.0%
United States Census Bureau, U.S. Decennial Census, 1870–2020.

The land that would become Mason County, West Virginia was first surveyed in 1772 by a team led by George Washington. They surveyed a tract of 51,302 acres, just over eighty square miles, north of a line drawn between Letart Falls and the mouth of Threemile Creek on the Great Kanawha, including all of Graham District, all of Waggener, and most of Robinson and Lewis Districts. The land was patented to them on December 15, 1772, by Lord Dunmore, the royal governor of Virginia, on behalf of King George III. Most of Graham District consists of a 6,000-acre tract allocated to John West, occupying the east portion of the district, and the neighboring 6,000 acres allocated to John Polson, forming the center of the district. The segment of Graham District lying north of Robinson and running northward along the boundary with Waggener District consists of the eastern ends of tracts originally allocated to Andrew Waggener, George Muse, and Peter Hog, making up part of the balance of 4,736 acres out of Graham District's total of 16,736; the remainder consists of submerged land in the Ohio River, not included in the original survey, but reserved by Virginia when it ceded its claims to the Northwest Territory in 1784.

John Polson sold his 6,000-acre tract to William Graham, a Presbyterian minister from Richmond, who hoped to establish a settlement in western Virginia for himself and his followers. In 1798, Graham and several families that had agreed to join his colony traveled to what would soon become Mason County, clearing several acres of land, and building a small fort. The following year, Graham returned to Richmond on business, and there died of a fever. His followers abandoned the settlement, and returned east. The place where they settled became known as Graham Station. Graham's heirs sold the land at public auction, where it was purchased by John Roush of Shenandoah County on behalf of himself and his brothers, Jacob, Henry, Daniel, George, and Jonas, except for 150 acres that Graham had sold to Michael Siegrist before his death. The Roushes and their relatives settled on the land.

In 1820, Thomas Hoffman established a water-powered grist mill, the first in the district, on Broad Run; he built a sawmill on Broad Run the next year. The first steam-powered mill was built in 1836 by Michael Zirckel. Gideon Henkel, a nephew of Paul Henkel, established a Lutheran Church about 1820, to serve the heavily German settlers, many of whom had come from the Shenandoah Valley with his uncle, the Roushes, and the Zirckels. The community of White Church, on Upper Flats, was built around a Presbyterian church organized by Francis Dutton in 1834. Union was built around a United Brethren church built in 1850, although the congregation dates from 1836.

Hartford City was founded in 1853, on land originally granted to Andrew Waggener along the Ohio River, but subsequently attached to Graham District. A salt well was bored in 1855, and the same year saw the establishment of the district's first post office, at Hartford. The town was incorporated in 1863, and is thought to have been named after Hartford, Connecticut. New Haven may have been established around the same time; supposedly it was called "New London" until 1856, when miners from Connecticut arrived to open the first coal mines, and renamed the village after their native town.

After West Virginia gained its independence from Virginia in 1863, the legislature enacted a law requiring the counties to be divided into civil townships. Mason County was divided into ten townships, each of which was named after a pioneer settler of Mason County. Graham Township, which like the other townships was converted into a magisterial district in 1872, was named after William Graham. It is the only Graham District in the state. John West's name is remembered by West Creek—which flows northeast, on the eastern side of the county—the land originally allocated to West.
