= Capehart =

Capehart can refer to:

== Persons ==
- Charles E. Capehart
- DeMonte Capehart (born 2002), American football player
- Edward Capehart O'Kelley
- Harry J. Capehart (1881–1955), American lawyer, politician, and businessperson
- Henry Capehart
- Homer E. Capehart, American businessman and senator from Indiana (1945–63)
- James Capehart
- Jerry Capehart
- Jonathan Capehart, American journalist and television personality

== Places ==
- Capehart, West Virginia
- Capehart House

== Other ==
- Capehart, a luxury home radio-phonograph popular in the 1930s and 1940s.
- Capehart-Farnsworth, a luxury home television popular in the 1950s; often sold under the "Capehart" name.
