= Wood, West Virginia =

- Unincorporated community
- Location within West Virginia Location within the United States
- Coordinates: 38°46′17″N 81°54′55″W
- Country: United States
- State: West Virginia
- County: Mason
- Elevation: 876 ft (267 m)
- Time zone: UTC-5 (Eastern (EST))
  - Summer (DST): UTC-4 (EDT)
- Area codes: 304 & 681
- GNIS feature ID: 1560332

Wood is an unincorporated community in Mason County, West Virginia, United States. Wood is located on County Route 44, 2.8 miles (4.5 km) east-northeast of Leon.
