= Howard Beale =

Howard Beale may refer to:

- Howard Beale (politician) (1898–1983), Australian politician and Ambassador to the United States
- Howard K. Beale (1899–1959), American historian and author
- Howard Beale (Network), a character in the 1976 film, played by Peter Finch

== See also ==
- Beale, a surname
- Beale (disambiguation)
