= Gunville (disambiguation) =

Gunville may refer to:

- Gunville, a settlement on the Isle of Wight
- Gunville, West Virginia, an unincorporated community in Mason County

== See also ==
- Tarrant Gunville, a village and civil parish in north Dorset, England
