= Minden, West Virginia =

- Census-designated place (CDP)
- Location within the state of West Virginia Minden (the United States)
- Coordinates: 37°58′33″N 81°7′10″W
- Country: United States
- State: West Virginia
- County: Fayette

Area
  - Total: 0.494 sq mi (1.28 km^{2})
  - Land: 0.494 sq mi (1.28 km^{2})
  - Water: 0 sq mi (0 km^{2})
- Elevation: 1,568 ft (478 m)

Population (2010)
  - Total: 250
  - Density: 510/sq mi (200/km^{2})
- Time zone: UTC-5 (Eastern (EST))
  - Summer (DST): UTC-4 (EDT)
- ZIP code: 25879
- Area code: 304

Minden is a census-designated place (CDP) in Fayette County, West Virginia, United States. As of the 2010 census, its population was 250. It has possessed a post office since 1905.

The community was named after Minden, Germany, the native town of a local coal-mining official. The Arbuckle creek runs through Minden.

== History ==
In 1984, the West Virginia Division of Natural Resources reported PCB transformers at Shaffer Mine, which is on land owned by Berwind Land Co to the EPA. Soil samples from the old Shaffer mine showed PCB levels of 250,000 parts per million (ppm) and the EPA declared it a Superfund Site. There were two clean-ups one in the 1980s and in 1992, including sealing of one part of the mine site. The United States Occupational Safety and Health Administration nevertheless did not monitor employee exposure to PCB. A local doctor said that already in the 1980s he had told EPA agents that he believed PCB exposure was causing a higher number of cancer.

In 2015, the community was annexed into the city of Oak Hill to acquire and upgrade the failing Arbuckle Public Service District. After a lengthy court battle, the annexation was upheld on November 18, 2016 by the West Virginia Supreme Court of Appeals. The Public Service District had been discharging sewage into Arbuckle Creek, investigated for loss and misappropriation of funds, and defaulted on bonds to the United States Department of Agriculture.

In June 2017, the EPA started sampling soil because of a higher than expected frequency of cancers. More than 30 percent of residents have been diagnosed with a form of cancer (80% per Men's Health, Jan/Feb 2020), and 100 people who have lived or live in Minden have reported that one or more family members have been cancer patients. Some have multiple myeloma, a very aggressive blood cancer.
