= Graham station =

Graham station may refer to:

== Train stations ==
- Graham Street light rail station, a light rail station in Port Melbourne, Victoria, Australia
- Graham station (New York Central Railroad), a former commuter rail station in Mount Pleasant, New York, United States
- Graham Avenue station, a subway station in Brooklyn, New York, United States
- Graham station (Pacific Electric), a former interurban station in Florence-Graham, California, United States

== Places ==
- Graham Station, West Virginia

== See also ==
- Graham Central Station
- Graham Central Station (album)
