= Waggener District, Mason County, West Virginia =

- Magisterial district
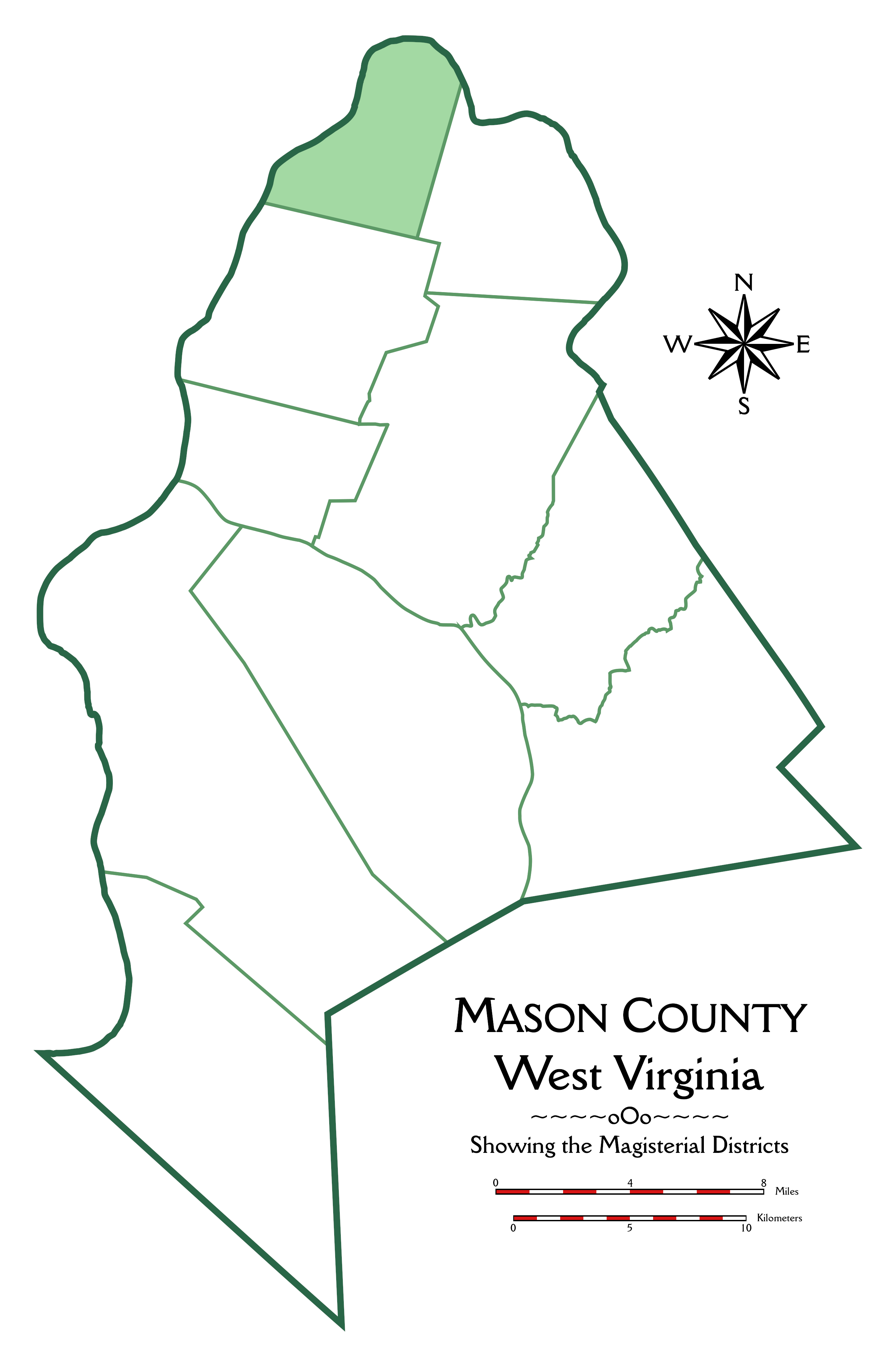
- Location of Waggener District in Mason County
- Coordinates: 38°59′01″N 82°02′02″W
- Country: United States
- State: West Virginia
- County: Mason
- Established: 1863
- Named for: Andrew Waggener

Area
  - Total: 19.93 sq mi (51.6 km^{2})
  - Land: 18.38 sq mi (47.6 km^{2})
  - Water: 1.54 sq mi (4.0 km^{2})
- Elevation: 741 ft (226 m)

Population (2020)
  - Total: 2,483
  - Density: 136/sq mi (53/km^{2})
- Time zone: UTC-5 (Eastern (EST))
  - Summer (DST): UTC-4 (EDT)
- GNIS feature ID: 1928398

Waggener Magisterial District is one of ten magisterial districts in Mason County, West Virginia, United States. The district was originally established as a civil township in 1863, and converted into a magisterial district in 1872. In 2020, Waggener District was home to 2,483 people.

== Geography ==
Waggener District is the northernmost district of Mason County. It is bounded on the north and west by the Ohio River, on the south by Robinson District, and to the east by Graham District. Across the river to the north and west is Salisbury Township, and to the northeast Sutton Township, both in Meigs County, Ohio.

At just under twenty square miles, Waggener District ranks ninth out of Mason County's ten magisterial districts in total area; only Lewis District is smaller. Most of Waggener District is hilly, except for the bottom lands along the Ohio. The soil consists of red, yellow, and blue clays, and black loam. The district contains one of the richest coal beds in the Ohio Valley, as well as abundant salt deposits.

The main streams are Ohio Tenmile Creek, which flows west into the Ohio near the lower end of the district; Ice Creek, which flows northwest and enters the Ohio at West Columbia; and Sliding Hill Creek, (Note: Most of Sliding Hill Creek is in Graham District, but its mouth is just to the west in Waggener District. The older portion of Hartford is in Graham District, to the east; the western portion is in Waggener.) which flows northward into the Ohio at Hartford. Of these, Tenmile Creek is the largest, and has four major tributaries: Burning Hill, Wolf's Branch, Rock Camp, and Peck's Branch.

The incorporated towns in Waggener District are Hartford and Mason, which along with the unincorporated villages of Clifton, Spilman, and West Columbia lie on the Ohio River bottoms in the northern and western parts of the district. The only other village in the district is Fairview, located in the hills about two and a half miles southeast of Clifton.

The only highway in the district is West Virginia Route 62, which parallels the Ohio River for the entire length of the district, and is known locally as Ohio River Road south of Clifton, and Adamsville Road between Mason and Hartford. It follows the course of Mason Street in Clifton, Second Street in Mason City, and Pike Street in Hartford. A bridge spans the Ohio River at Mason City, coming out on West Main Street between Pomeroy and Middleport, in Ohio. It is the only crossing between Point Pleasant and Ravenswood.

== Communities ==
Most of Waggener District's towns and villages were established along the Ohio River in the mid-nineteenth century, in order to utilize the area's abundant natural resources.

=== West Columbia ===
The first village established in Waggener District was West Columbia, founded in 1847 at the mouth of Ice Creek, twelve miles above Point Pleasant, near the site of what George Washington had described as "a coal hill on fire" (Note: The Burning Hill Branch of Tenmile Creek takes its name from this place.) in 1772. The settlement's name is patriotic, being derived from Columbia as the personification of America. West Columbia owed its existence to the salt industry, as a salt well was bored on Ice Creek that year, and the first salt furnace on the Ohio was built there the following year. The original salt company went bankrupt in 1858, but by this time the village had been laid out and settled. In 1864, Dr. Guthrie of Marietta established the Beacon Hill Salt Furnace, said in 1882 to have been the largest yet built in the Ohio Valley; it produced up to two hundred and fifty barrels of salt per day.

Coal mining at West Columbia began at almost the same time as the salt industry, but remained on a small scale until the establishment of the West Columbia Mining and Manufacturing Company in 1852. Other early establishments at West Columbia included a tannery opened by Lemuel Harpold in 1847, as well as a flour mill and a sawmill built around the same time. In 1849, Thomas Brock established a foundry and machine shop; these burned in 1874. The Camden City mines were opened a mile below West Columbia in 1869 on land belonging to J.H. Camden; afterward they were purchased by the Consolidated Coal and Mining Company.

=== Clifton ===
Clifton's origin dates to 1853, when Thomas Clark, Thomas Stewart, Thomas Potts, and Henry Potts formed a coal-mining cooperative along the river opposite Middleport, Ohio. The settlement was at first known as "Clark's Bank", but the mines changed hands several times over the next dozen years, and new coal mines were opened nearby. In 1866, the original company was purchased by a concern led by H.G. Daniels, who named them the Clifton mines, apparently after the steep bluffs overlooking the settlement, giving the same name to the village that had grown up around the mining operation. Two salt furnaces were built in 1867, entering production the following year. A foundry, originally the Clifton Nail Works, later the Standard Nail and Iron Company, was built in 1867. Clifton would also become the headquarters of the Vulcan Machine Company, which manufactured mine cars, machinery, and engineering supplies at its shops in Middleport.

=== Hartford ===
Hartford City was founded along the Ohio River in 1853, on part of the land originally granted to Andrew Waggener. The original settlement is now in Graham District, but the newer, western portion of the town lies in Waggener. The first salt well at Hartford was bored in 1855, and the same year saw the establishment of a post office. Hartford was incorporated in 1863, and is thought to have been named after Hartford, Connecticut.

=== Mason City ===
Mason City, or simply Mason, was established as a coal-mining town in 1853, on bottom land that had belonged to John Brown and was originally known as "Waggener's Bottom". The first settlers provided labor for the Mason City Mining Company, established the same year by B.C.M. Lovell and F.C.H. Smith. Smith and R.C.M. Lovell built a salt furnace at Mason in 1856; a second furnace was opened by the Hope Company in 1870. A saw mill was built in 1854. Mason City was officially chartered by the Virginia Legislature in 1856. In 1868, Dr. H. Stieren established a bromine works at Mason; by the 1880s Mason City was home to the world's largest producer of bromine.

== History ==
Historical population
Census	Pop.	Note	%±
1870	3,324		—
1880	4,585		37.9%
1890	3,362		−26.7%
1900	2,769		−17.6%
1910	2,607		−5.9%
1920	2,514		−3.6%
1930	2,514		0.0%
1940	2,684		6.8%
1950	3,128		16.5%
1960	3,222		3.0%
1970	2,887		−10.4%
1980	3,213		11.3%
1990	2,666		−17.0%
2000	2,718		2.0%
2010	2,720		0.1%
2020	2,483		−8.7%
United States Census Bureau, U.S. Decennial Census, 1870–2020.

The land that would become Mason County, West Virginia was first surveyed in 1772 by a team led by George Washington. They surveyed a tract of 51,302 acres, just over eighty square miles, north of a line drawn between Letart Falls and the mouth of the Great Kanawha, including all of Waggener District, all of Graham, and most of Robinson and Lewis Districts. The land was patented to them on December 15, 1772, by Lord Dunmore, the royal governor of Virginia, on behalf of King George III. Waggener District consists of land originally allocated to Andrew Waggener, George Muse, and Peter Hog. Waggener's parcel consisted of 3,400 acres at the northern end of the survey; immediately south of this was Muse's tract of 6,000 acres; and Hog's 3,000 acres lies in the southern end of the district. The eastern ends of these parcels are now attached to Graham District, leaving a balance of approximately 12,753 acres in Waggener District, including submerged land in the Ohio River, not included in the original survey, but reserved by Virginia when it ceded its claims to the Northwest Territory in 1784.

Andrew Waggener himself was one of the first settlers of Waggener District. His heirs would later sell his original 3,400 acre parcel to Henry Purviance, who subdivided the land, and sold it according to the needs of the purchasers. Among the other early settlers was Michael Zirckel, who built the first grist mill in the district, and the famed Indian fighter Luman Gibbs. After West Virginia gained its independence from Virginia in 1863, the legislature enacted a law requiring the counties to be divided into civil townships. Mason County was divided into ten townships, each of which was named after a pioneer settler of Mason County. Like the other townships, Waggener was converted into a magisterial district in 1872. It is the only Waggener District in the state.
