= Fairview, Mason County, West Virginia =

Unincorporated community in West Virginia, United States

Fairview, West Virginia
- Unincorporated community
- Location within West Virginia Location within the United States
- Coordinates: 38°58′44″N 82°00′25″W
- Country: United States
- State: West Virginia
- County: Mason
- Elevation: 686 ft (209 m)
- Time zone: UTC-5 (Eastern (EST))
  - Summer (DST): UTC-4 (EDT)
- Area codes: 304 & 681
- GNIS feature ID: 1538795

Fairview is an unincorporated community in Mason County, West Virginia, United States. Fairview is located on County Route 1, 2 miles (3.2 km) south-southwest of Hartford.
