= Spilman, West Virginia =

- Unincorporated community
- Location within West Virginia Location within the United States
- Coordinates: 38°58′44″N 82°04′34″W
- Country: United States
- State: West Virginia
- County: Mason
- Established: 1887
- Named for: Henry E. Spilman
- Elevation: 568 ft (173 m)
- Time zone: UTC-5 (Eastern (EST))
  - Summer (DST): UTC-4 (EDT)
- Area codes: 304 & 681
- GNIS feature ID: 1547148

Spilman is an unincorporated community on the Ohio River in Mason County, West Virginia, United States. The village is located along Spilman Lane, Mason County Route 62/24, parallel to West Virginia Route 62 in Waggener District, about three quarters of a mile southeast of West Columbia.

Spilman grew around the site of a post office established in 1887, and named after its first postmaster, Henry E. Spilman, who ran the post office from 1887 to 1909. The post office continued to operate until 1925, when it was discontinued, and the mail redirected to West Columbia. A 1908 USGS topographical survey map shows about two dozen houses or other buildings at Spilman; there were only half as many in 1989, all to the west of Spilman Church.
