= Thomas Hannan (Virginia settler) =

- Born: December 25, 1757; Frederick County, Virginia
- Died: April 18, 1835 (aged 77); Cabell County, Virginia
- Military career
- Service years: 1774, 1776-1777, 1781
- Conflicts: Lord Dunmore's War; American Revolutionary War

Thomas Hannan (December 25, 1757 - April 18, 1835) was an American Revolutionary War soldier and first Anglo settler of the Kanawha River region of Virginia (now West Virginia).

== Biography ==
=== Early life ===
Thomas Hannan was born on December 25, 1757, in Frederick County, Virginia to Thomas Hannan and Lucretia Morris. In 1781, he married Elizabeth Henry.

=== Military service ===
Hannan first fought in Lord Dunmore's War at the Battle of Point Pleasant. At the start of the American Revolutionary War, he enlisted in the navy for one year. In 1781, several years after his initial term of enlistment, he was drafted into a rifle regiment and served at the Battle of Yorktown.

=== Western Virginia settler ===
After the war, Hannan was granted nearly 1,000 acres of land and moved west, becoming the first Anglo settler of Cabell County, West Virginia (the current location of Huntington, West Virginia) and one of the earliest settlers of the Kanawha and Ohio River Basin. He forged "Hannan's Trace," one of the original roads to the West from Virginia, the first roadway through what would later become Mason County, West Virginia and Cabell County, as well as a principal route from western West Virginia and the interior of Ohio. This path linked the then-capital of the Northwest Territory, Chillicothe, Ohio, to points in the Eastern United States. Hannan was a friend and neighbor of several other early settlers in the Kanawha Valley region, including Anne Bailey and Daniel Boone.

== Legacy ==
There is an historical marker for Hannan, erected in 2009 by West Virginia Archives and History, near Glenwood, West Virginia, on Huntington Road in Mason County. A number of institutions have been named for Hannan and his trail:

- Hannan Trace Elementary School in Crown City, Ohio
- Hannan High School and Hannan Public Library in Ashton, West Virginia
- Hannan District, Mason County, West Virginia
