= Pondlick, West Virginia =

- Unincorporated community
- Location within West Virginia Location within the United States
- Coordinates: 38°42′49″N 82°06′42″W
- Country: United States
- State: West Virginia
- County: Mason
- Elevation: 610 ft (190 m)
- Time zone: UTC-5 (Eastern (EST))
  - Summer (DST): UTC-4 (EDT)
- Area codes: 304 & 681
- GNIS feature ID: 1560292

Pondlick is an unincorporated community in Mason County, West Virginia, United States. Pondlick is located at the junction of County Routes 54 and 56, 9.1 miles (14.6 km) south of Point Pleasant. The community once had a post office, which is now closed.
