= Rayburn, West Virginia =

Rayburn
- Unincorporated community
- Location within the state of West Virginia
- Coordinates: 38°52′22″N 82°1′36″W
- Country: United States
- State: West Virginia
- County: Mason
- Elevation: 659 ft (201 m)
- Time zone: UTC-5 (Eastern (EST))
  - Summer (DST): UTC-4 (EDT)
- GNIS ID: 1549892

Rayburn is an unincorporated community in Mason County, West Virginia, United States.
