= Deerlick, West Virginia =

Unincorporated community in West Virginia, United States

- Unincorporated community
- Location within West Virginia Location within the United States
- Coordinates: 38°44′26″N 81°51′19″W
- Country: United States
- State: West Virginia
- County: Mason
- Elevation: 627 ft (191 m)
- Time zone: UTC-5 (Eastern (EST))
  - Summer (DST): UTC-4 (EDT)
- Area codes: 304 & 681
- GNIS feature ID: 1538114

Deerlick is an unincorporated community in Mason County, West Virginia, United States. Deerlick is located at the junction of County Routes 31 and 60, 5.7 miles (9.2 km) east of Leon. The community once had a post office, which is now closed.
