= Waterloo, West Virginia =

- Unincorporated community
- Location within West Virginia Location within the United States
- Coordinates: 38°43′51″N 81°56′04″W
- Country: United States
- State: West Virginia
- County: Mason
- Elevation: 564 ft (172 m)
- Time zone: UTC-5 (Eastern (EST))
  - Summer (DST): UTC-4 (EDT)
- Area codes: 304 & 681
- GNIS feature ID: 1549980

Waterloo is an unincorporated community in Mason County, West Virginia, United States. Waterloo is located on County Route 31, 2 miles (3.2 km) southeast of Leon.
