= Beale (disambiguation) =

Beale is a family name.

Beale may also refer to:

In places:

- Beale, West Virginia, an unincorporated community
- Beale Air Force Base, a U.S. Air Force base in Yuba County, California
- Beale Mountains, small range in the Mojave National Preserve in eastern California
- Beale Park, wildlife park and gardens by the River Thames in Berkshire, England
- Beale Street, historic street in Downtown Memphis, Tennessee
- Beale Township, Pennsylvania, U.S.

In other uses:

- USS Beale (DD-471), a Fletcher-class destroyer of the U.S. Navy
- Beale ciphers (or Beale papers), three encrypted documents allegedly disclosing a treasure location
- Beale code, an American classification of geography
- Beale number, a parameter that characterizes the performance of Stirling engines
- Beale Piano, a piano brand formerly manufactured in Sydney Australia
- Beale plc, a British department store group usually known by its trading name of Beales

== See also ==
- Bealeton, Virginia
