= Wyoma, West Virginia =

Wyoma
- Unincorporated community
- Location within the state of West Virginia Wyoma (the United States)
- Coordinates: 38°45′48″N 82°7′44″W
- Country: United States
- State: West Virginia
- County: Mason
- Time zone: UTC-5 (Eastern (EST))
  - Summer (DST): UTC-4 (EDT)
- FIPS code: 1553528

Wyoma was an unincorporated community located in Mason County, West Virginia, United States. The Wyoma post office no longer exists.
