= Beale, West Virginia =

Unincorporated community in West Virginia, US

Coordinates: 38°46′02″N 82°11′50″W

Beale is an unincorporated community in Mason County, in the U.S. state of West Virginia.

== History ==
A post office called Beale was established in 1902, and remained in operation until 1916. The community has the name of Colonel Charles Beale, an early settler.
