= Tribble, West Virginia =

Tribble
- Unincorporated community
- Location within the state of West Virginia Tribble (the United States)
- Coordinates: 38°41′15″N 81°50′16″W
- Country: United States
- State: West Virginia
- County: Mason
- Elevation: 620 ft (190 m)
- Time zone: UTC-5 (Eastern (EST))
  - Summer (DST): UTC-4 (EDT)
- GNIS ID: 1555823

Tribble is an unincorporated community in Mason County, West Virginia, United States. Its post office closed in 1941.
