= Grimms Landing, West Virginia =

- Unincorporated community
- Location within West Virginia Location within the United States
- Coordinates: 38°40′39″N 81°56′55″W
- Country: United States
- State: West Virginia
- County: Mason
- Elevation: 571 ft (174 m)
- Time zone: UTC-5 (Eastern (EST))
  - Summer (DST): UTC-4 (EDT)
- Area codes: 304 & 681
- GNIS feature ID: 1539754

Grimms Landing is an unincorporated community in Mason County, West Virginia, United States. Grimms Landing is located on the east bank of the Kanawha River along West Virginia Route 62, 4.5 miles (7.2 km) north-northeast of Buffalo.

== History ==
Grimms Landing had a post office, which opened on September 9, 1878, and closed on November 2, 2002. The community was named after George Grimm, who was instrumental in securing a post office for the town.

== Notable person ==
- Gus Douglass, West Virginia Commissioner of Agriculture, was raised in Grimms Landing.
