= Beech Hill, West Virginia =

Unincorporated community in West Virginia, United States

Beech Hill
- Unincorporated community
- Location within the state of West Virginia Beech Hill (the United States)
- Coordinates: 38°45′53″N 82°0′10″W
- Country: United States
- State: West Virginia
- County: Mason
- Elevation: 574 ft (175 m)
- Time zone: UTC-5 (Eastern (EST))
  - Summer (DST): UTC-4 (EDT)
- GNIS ID: 1535541

Beech Hill is an unincorporated community in Mason County, West Virginia, United States.

The community derives its name from the beech trees near the elevated town site.
