= Mount Olive, Mason County, West Virginia =

Mount Olive, West Virginia
- Unincorporated community
- Location within West Virginia Location within the United States
- Coordinates: 38°31′28″N 82°04′07″W
- Country: United States
- State: West Virginia
- County: Mason
- Elevation: 919 ft (280 m)
- Time zone: UTC-5 (Eastern (EST))
  - Summer (DST): UTC-4 (EDT)
- Area codes: 304 & 681
- GNIS feature ID: 1543693

Mount Olive is an unincorporated community in Mason County, West Virginia, United States. Mount Olive is 9.5 miles (15.3 km) west of Winfield.
