= Nat, West Virginia =

Nat
- Unincorporated community
- Location within the state of West Virginia Nat (the United States)
- Coordinates: 38°41′42″N 81°53′44″W
- Country: United States
- State: West Virginia
- County: Mason
- Elevation: 581 ft (177 m)
- Time zone: UTC-5 (Eastern (EST))
  - Summer (DST): UTC-4 (EDT)
- GNIS ID: 1544051

Nat is an unincorporated community in Mason County, in the U.S. state of West Virginia.

== History ==
A post office called Nat was established in 1892, and remained in operation until 1948. The community was named after the father of an early postmaster.
