= Sassafras, West Virginia =

Sassafras
- Unincorporated community
- Location within the state of West Virginia Sassafras (the United States)
- Coordinates: 38°56′3″N 82°0′47″W
- Country: United States
- State: West Virginia
- County: Mason
- Elevation: 581 ft (177 m)
- Time zone: UTC-5 (Eastern (EST))
  - Summer (DST): UTC-4 (EDT)
- FIPS code: 1549914

Sassafras was an unincorporated community located in Mason County, West Virginia, United States. The Sassafras Post Office no longer exists.
