= Arbuckle, West Virginia =

Unincorporated community in West Virginia, United States

- Unincorporated community
- Location within West Virginia Location within the United States
- Coordinates: 38°42′46″N 81°56′53″W
- Country: United States
- State: West Virginia
- County: Mason
- Elevation: 587 ft (179 m)
- Time zone: UTC-5 (Eastern (EST))
  - Summer (DST): UTC-4 (EDT)
- ZIP codes: 25502
- Area codes: 304 & 681
- GNIS feature ID: 1534990

Arbuckle is an unincorporated community in Mason County, West Virginia, United States. Arbuckle is located along the east bank of the Kanawha River, south of Leon.
