= Ash, West Virginia =

Unincorporated community in West Virginia, United States

Ash
- Unincorporated community
- Location within the state of West Virginia Ash (the United States)
- Coordinates: 38°49′57″N 81°58′24″W
- Country: United States
- State: West Virginia
- County: Mason
- Elevation: 892 ft (272 m)
- Time zone: UTC-5 (Eastern (EST))
  - Summer (DST): UTC-4 (EDT)
- GNIS ID: 1560640

Ash is an unincorporated community in Mason County, West Virginia, United States.
