= Maggie, West Virginia =

Unincorporated community in West Virginia, US

Coordinates: 38°56′44″N 82°05′19″W

Location of Maggie within the state of West Virginia

Maggie is an unincorporated community in Mason County, in the U.S. state of West Virginia.

== History ==
A post office called Maggie was established in 1887 and remained in operation until 1935. The community was named after a woman named Maggie, who was instrumental in establishing a post office for the town.
