= New Haven, West Virginia =

- Town
- Location of New Haven in Mason County, West Virginia.
- Coordinates: 38°59′16″N 81°57′51″W
- Country: United States
- State: West Virginia
- County: Mason

Area
  - Total: 1.30 sq mi (3.37 km^{2})
  - Land: 1.10 sq mi (2.85 km^{2})
  - Water: 0.20 sq mi (0.52 km^{2})
- Elevation: 600 ft (183 m)

Population (2020)
  - Total: 1,476
  - Estimate (2021): 1,462
  - Density: 1,330.1/sq mi (513.57/km^{2})
- Time zone: UTC-5 (Eastern (EST))
  - Summer (DST): UTC-4 (EDT)
- ZIP code: 25265
- Area code: 304
- FIPS code: 54-58564
- GNIS feature ID: 1555207
- Website: www.townofnewhavenwv.com

New Haven is a town in Mason County, West Virginia, United States, along the Ohio River. The population was 1,485 at the 2020 census. It is part of the Point Pleasant, WV–OH Micropolitan Statistical Area.

The town was named after New Haven, Connecticut, the native home of the local mine proprietors.

== Geography ==
New Haven is located at 38°59′16″N 81°57′51″W (38.987786, -81.964089).

According to the United States Census Bureau, the town has a total area of 1.30 square miles (3.37 km^{2}), of which 1.10 square miles (2.85 km^{2}) is land and 0.20 square miles (0.52 km^{2}) is water.

== Demographics ==
Historical population
Census	Pop.	Note	%±
1940	606		—
1950	969		59.9%
1960	1,314		35.6%
1970	1,538		17.0%
1980	1,723		12.0%
1990	1,632		−5.3%
2000	1,559		−4.5%
2010	1,560		0.1%
2020	1,476		−5.4%
2021 (est.)	1,462	▼	−0.9%
U.S. Decennial Census

=== 2010 census ===
As of the census of 2010, there were 1,560 people, 684 households, and 449 families living in the town. The population density was 1,418.2 inhabitants per square mile (547.6/km^{2}). There were 765 housing units at an average density of 695.5 per square mile (268.5/km^{2}). The racial makeup of the town was 97.9% White, 0.4% African American, 0.3% Native American, 0.1% Asian, 0.4% from other races, and 0.9% from two or more races. Hispanic or Latino of any race were 0.7% of the population.

There were 684 households, of which 29.7% had children under the age of 18 living with them, 49.3% were married couples living together, 12.3% had a female householder with no husband present, 4.1% had a male householder with no wife present, and 34.4% were non-families. 32.5% of all households were made up of individuals, and 17.8% had someone living alone who was 65 years of age or older. The average household size was 2.28 and the average family size was 2.84.

The median age in the town was 42.4 years. 22.1% of residents were under the age of 18; 7% were between the ages of 18 and 24; 23.7% were from 25 to 44; 27.7% were from 45 to 64; and 19.3% were 65 years of age or older. The gender makeup of the town was 48.1% male and 51.9% female.

=== 2000 census ===
As of the census of 2000, there were 1,559 people, 671 households, and 462 families living in the town. The population density was 1,432.3 inhabitants per square mile (553.0/km^{2}). There were 728 housing units at an average density of 668.8 per square mile (258.2/km^{2}). The racial makeup of the town was 98.65% White, 0.38% African American, 0.13% Native American, 0.32% Asian, and 0.51% from two or more races. Hispanic or Latino of any race were 0.58% of the population.

There were 671 households, out of which 29.8% had children under the age of 18 living with them, 56.8% were married couples living together, 9.1% had a female householder with no husband present, and 31.0% were non-families. 28.9% of all households were made up of individuals, and 15.8% had someone living alone who was 65 years of age or older. The average household size was 2.32 and the average family size was 2.83.

In the town, the population was spread out, with 22.6% under the age of 18, 7.4% from 18 to 24, 25.3% from 25 to 44, 26.4% from 45 to 64, and 18.2% who were 65 years of age or older. The median age was 41 years. For every 100 females, there were 93.7 males. For every 100 females age 18 and over, there were 85.0 males.

The median income for a household in the town was $27,008, and the median income for a family was $36,719. Males had a median income of $40,556 versus $17,273 for females. The per capita income for the town was $15,339. About 10.6% of families and 13.7% of the population were below the poverty line, including 15.9% of those under age 18 and 11.3% of those age 65 or over.

== See also ==
- List of cities and towns along the Ohio River
