= Ambrosia, West Virginia =

Unincorporated community in West Virginia, United States

Ambrosia
- Unincorporated community
- Location within the state of West Virginia Ambrosia (the United States)
- Coordinates: 38°48′20″N 82°3′10″W
- Country: United States
- State: West Virginia
- County: Mason
- Elevation: 538 ft (164 m)
- Time zone: UTC-5 (Eastern (EST))
  - Summer (DST): UTC-4 (EDT)
- GNIS ID: 1553725

Ambrosia is an unincorporated community in Mason County, West Virginia, United States.
