= Upland, Mason County, West Virginia =

Upland, West Virginia
- Unincorporated community
- Location within West Virginia Location within the United States
- Coordinates: 38°34′07″N 82°04′23″W
- Country: United States
- State: West Virginia
- County: Mason
- Elevation: 722 ft (220 m)
- Time zone: UTC-5 (Eastern (EST))
  - Summer (DST): UTC-4 (EDT)
- Area codes: 304 & 681
- GNIS feature ID: 1555857

Upland is an unincorporated community in Mason County, West Virginia, United States. Upland is 10 miles (16 km) west-northwest of Winfield.
