= Hardesty's Historical and Geographical Encyclopedia =

19th century American encyclopedia

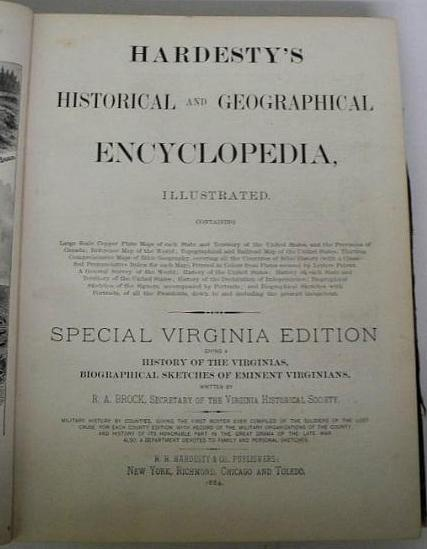
Title page of Hardesty's Historical and Geographical Encyclopedia, "Special Virginia Edition" (1884)

Hardesty's Historical and Geographical Encyclopedia was a voluminous late 19th century American encyclopedia produced by H.H. Hardesty & Company, publishers, of Chicago and Toledo. A massive work with enormous amount of textual and statistical data, it went through various editions and variations throughout the 1880s, with some special editions focusing on areas of special regional significance. (E.g., a stand-alone military history under the title The Military History of Ohio in special county editions which did not include the more general information in the main Encyclopedia, but included the state's general military history in addition to a specific county's military history. Another example was the Special Virginia Edition giving a history of the Virginias, written by R.A. Brock, secretary of the Virginia Historical Society.)

The main edition of the Encyclopedia contained large scale copper plate maps of each state and territory of the United States; and the provinces of Canada; a reference map of the world; a topographical and railroad map of the United States; thirteen comprehensive maps of Bible geography; a general survey of the world; history of the United States; each state and territory; Declaration of Independence; sketches of the Signers, with portraits; and of Presidents. County editions (typically 2 or 3 counties per volume) include brief county histories and brief biographies of early or pioneering county residents.

Hardesty printed about 10,000 copies of main edition, 2,000 copies of the Virginia/West Virginia supplement, and subsequently prepared local historical (county) material for very limited editions of about 250 copies each.

== See also ==
- James Franklin Comstock
