= Letart, West Virginia =

- Location within West Virginia
- Coordinates: 38°53′41″N 81°56′00″W
- Country: United States
- State: West Virginia
- County: Mason
- Elevation: 581 ft (177.1 m)
- Time zone: UTC-5 (EST)
  - Summer (DST): UTC-4 (EDT)
- ZIP code: 25253
- Area code: 304
- GNIS: 1541798

Letart is an unincorporated community in Mason County, West Virginia, United States. It is located on the Ohio River.

Letart is part of the Point Pleasant, WV–OH Micropolitan Statistical Area.

The community was named after one Mr. Letart, a local pioneer settler.
