= Baden, West Virginia =

Unincorporated community in West Virginia, United States

Baden
- Unincorporated community
- Location within the state of West Virginia Baden (the United States)
- Coordinates: 38°47′54″N 81°53′14″W
- Country: United States
- State: West Virginia
- County: Mason
- Elevation: 961 ft (293 m)
- Time zone: UTC-5 (Eastern (EST))
  - Summer (DST): UTC-4 (EDT)
- GNIS ID: 1549577

Baden is an unincorporated community in Mason County, West Virginia, United States.
