= Gunville, West Virginia =

Gunville
- Unincorporated community
- Location within the state of West Virginia Gunville (the United States)
- Coordinates: 38°46′29″N 81°52′21″W
- Country: United States
- State: West Virginia
- County: Mason
- Elevation: 942 ft (287 m)
- Time zone: UTC-5 (Eastern (EST))
  - Summer (DST): UTC-4 (EDT)
- GNIS ID: 1549720

Gunville is an unincorporated community in Mason County, West Virginia, United States.

A post office called Gunville was established in 1888, and remained in operation until being discontinued in 1909.
