= Ashton, West Virginia =

Unincorporated community in West Virginia, United States

- Unincorporated community
- Location within West Virginia Location within the United States
- Coordinates: 38°37′27″N 82°09′53″W
- Country: United States
- State: West Virginia
- County: Mason
- Elevation: 564 ft (172 m)
- Time zone: UTC-5 (Eastern (EST))
  - Summer (DST): UTC-4 (EDT)
- ZIP code: 25503
- Area codes: 304 & 681
- GNIS feature ID: 1550121

Ashton is an unincorporated community in Mason County, West Virginia, United States. Ashton is located on the Ohio River and West Virginia Route 2, 15 miles (24 km) south of Point Pleasant. Ashton has a post office with ZIP code 25503.

The community was named for ash trees near the original town site.
