= Hartford City, West Virginia =

- Town
- Location of Hartford City in Mason County, West Virginia.
- Coordinates: 39°0′13″N 81°59′28″W
- Country: United States
- State: West Virginia
- County: Mason

Area
  - Total: 1.24 sq mi (3.21 km^{2})
  - Land: 1.24 sq mi (3.20 km^{2})
  - Water: 0 sq mi (0.00 km^{2})
- Elevation: 581 ft (177 m)

Population (2020)
  - Total: 503
  - Estimate (2021): 504
  - Density: 480.1/sq mi (185.36/km^{2})
- Time zone: UTC-5 (Eastern (EST))
  - Summer (DST): UTC-4 (EDT)
- Area code: 304
- FIPS code: 54-35500
- GNIS feature ID: 1540025
- Website: https://local.wv.gov/hartford/Pages/default.aspx

Hartford City, also known as Hartford, is a town in Mason County, West Virginia, United States. The population was 509 at the 2020 census. It is part of the Point Pleasant, WV–OH Micropolitan Statistical Area.

== History ==
Hartford is located on a portion of land owned by Colonel Andrew Waggener, who in 1772 was given 4,000 acres (16 km^{2}) by King George III for his services in the French and Indian War. It was established as a town in 1853, and a coal mine was established the same year. Salt extraction began in 1856, by capitalists from Connecticut named Morgan Buckley and William Healey, who named the town for Hartford, the state capital of Connecticut. The first post office was opened in 1858, and the community was incorporated in 1868.

== Geography ==
Hartford City is located at 39°0′13″N 81°59′28″W (39.003704, -81.991203), along the Ohio River.

According to the United States Census Bureau, the town has a total area of 1.24 square miles (3.21 km^{2}), all land.

== Demographics ==
Historical population
Census	Pop.	Note	%±
1870	918		—
1880	567		−38.2%
1890	446		−21.3%
1900	515		15.5%
1910	358		−30.5%
1920	430		20.1%
1930	423		−1.6%
1940	467		10.4%
1950	366		−21.6%
1960	376		2.7%
1970	527		40.2%
1980	556		5.5%
1990	487		−12.4%
2000	519		6.6%
2010	614		18.3%
2020	503		−18.1%
2021 (est.)	504	▲	0.2%
U.S. Decennial Census

=== 2010 census ===
As of the census of 2010, there were 614 people, 253 households, and 175 families living in the town. The population density was 495.2 inhabitants per square mile (191.2/km^{2}). There were 357 housing units at an average density of 287.9 per square mile (111.2/km^{2}). The racial makeup of the town was 96.6% White, 0.2% African American, 0.3% Native American, 0.3% Asian, and 2.6% from two or more races. Hispanic or Latino of any race were 0.2% of the population.

There were 253 households, of which 31.2% had children under the age of 18 living with them, 49.4% were married couples living together, 14.6% had a female householder with no husband present, 5.1% had a male householder with no wife present, and 30.8% were non-families. 25.7% of all households were made up of individuals, and 10.3% had someone living alone who was 65 years of age or older. The average household size was 2.43 and the average family size was 2.93.

The median age in the town was 39.5 years. 22.3% of residents were under the age of 18; 10.8% were between the ages of 18 and 24; 24.6% were from 25 to 44; 28% were from 45 to 64; and 14.3% were 65 years of age or older. The gender makeup of the town was 50.5% male and 49.5% female.

=== 2000 census ===
As of the census of 2000, there were 519 people, 216 households, and 150 families living in the town. The population density was 415.6 inhabitants per square mile (160.5/km^{2}). There were 289 housing units at an average density of 231.4 per square mile (89.3/km^{2}). The racial makeup of the town was 98.84% White, 0.58% Native American, 0.19% Pacific Islander, and 0.39% from two or more races.

There were 216 households, out of which 31.5% had children under the age of 18 living with them, 52.8% were married couples living together, 11.1% had a female householder with no husband present, and 30.1% were non-families. 26.9% of all households were made up of individuals, and 11.6% had someone living alone who was 65 years of age or older. The average household size was 2.40 and the average family size was 2.93.

In the town, the population was spread out, with 24.1% under the age of 18, 6.7% from 18 to 24, 30.3% from 25 to 44, 25.4% from 45 to 64, and 13.5% who were 65 years of age or older. The median age was 38 years. For every 100 females, there were 97.3 males. For every 100 females age 18 and over, there were 95.0 males.

The median income for a household in the town was $24,219, and the median income for a family was $31,528. Males had a median income of $25,469 versus $16,406 for females. The per capita income for the town was $11,661. About 14.3% of families and 16.9% of the population were below the poverty line, including 24.8% of those under age 18 and 12.0% of those age 65 or over.

== See also ==
- List of cities and towns along the Ohio River
