= Graham Station, West Virginia =

Unincorporated community in West Virginia, US

Coordinates: 38.9645242°N 81.9279148°W

Graham Station is an unincorporated community in Mason County, in the U.S. state of West Virginia.

== History ==
A post office called Graham Station was established in 1863, and remained in operation until 1943. The hamlet was named after William Graham, a local minister.
