= Leon, West Virginia =

- Town
- Location of Leon in Mason County, West Virginia.
- Coordinates: 38°44′58″N 81°57′29″W
- Country: United States
- State: West Virginia
- County: Mason

Area
  - Total: 0.37 sq mi (0.97 km^{2})
  - Land: 0.32 sq mi (0.83 km^{2})
  - Water: 0.054 sq mi (0.14 km^{2})
- Elevation: 568 ft (173 m)

Population (2020)
  - Total: 137
  - Estimate (2021): 135
  - Density: 462/sq mi (178.5/km^{2})
- Time zone: UTC-5 (Eastern (EST))
  - Summer (DST): UTC-4 (EDT)
- ZIP code: 25123
- Area code: 304
- FIPS code: 54-46300
- GNIS feature ID: 1541786

Leon is a town in Mason County, West Virginia, United States, situated along the Kanawha River. The population was 137 at the 2020 census. It is part of the Point Pleasant, WV–OH Micropolitan Statistical Area.

== Etymology ==
Leon was known as Cologne until, in 1880, it was changed to its current name; however, it is unknown from where the name 'Leon' was derived.

== History ==
The Gen. John McCausland House was listed on the National Register of Historic Places in 1980 and the boundary expanded in 2000.

== Geography ==
Leon is located at 38°44′58″N 81°57′29″W (38.749501, -81.958135).

According to the United States Census Bureau, the town has a total area of 0.37 square miles (0.96 km^{2}), of which 0.32 square miles (0.83 km^{2}) is land and 0.05 square miles (0.13 km^{2}) is water.

The Kanawha River, which cuts through the whole state of West Virginia, passes by Leon.

== Demographics ==
Historical population
Census	Pop.	Note	%±
1880	127		—
1890	242		90.6%
1900	250		3.3%
1910	240		−4.0%
1920	299		24.6%
1930	283		−5.4%
1940	219		−22.6%
1950	244		11.4%
1960	236		−3.3%
1970	192		−18.6%
1980	228		18.8%
1990	145		−36.4%
2000	132		−9.0%
2010	158		19.7%
2020	137		−13.3%
2021 (est.)	135	▼	−1.5%
U.S. Decennial Census

=== 2010 census ===
As of the census of 2010, there were 158 people, 61 households, and 46 families living in the town. The population density was 493.8 inhabitants per square mile (190.7/km^{2}). There were 77 housing units at an average density of 240.6 per square mile (92.9/km^{2}). The racial makeup of the town was 98.1% White, 0.6% African American, and 1.3% from two or more races.

There were 61 households, of which 26.2% had children under the age of 18 living with them, 60.7% were married couples living together, 9.8% had a female householder with no husband present, 4.9% had a male householder with no wife present, and 24.6% were non-families. 21.3% of all households were made up of individuals, and 21.3% had someone living alone who was 65 years of age or older. The average household size was 2.59 and the average family size was 3.00.

The median age in the town was 43.6 years. 15.8% of residents were under the age of 18; 10.8% were between the ages of 18 and 24; 27.8% were from 25 to 44; 21% were from 45 to 64; and 24.7% were 65 years of age or older. The gender makeup of the town was 50.0% male and 50.0% female.

=== 2000 census ===
As of the census of 2000, there were 132 people, 60 households, and 40 families living in the town. The population density was 385.7 inhabitants per square mile (148.9/km^{2}). There were 73 housing units at an average density of 213.3 per square mile (82.4/km^{2}). The racial makeup of the town was 100.00% White. Hispanic or Latino of any race were 0.76% of the population.

There were 60 households, out of which 26.7% had children under the age of 18 living with them, 60.0% were married couples living together, 3.3% had a female householder with no husband present, and 33.3% were non-families. 33.3% of all households were made up of individuals, and 15.0% had someone living alone who was 65 years of age or older. The average household size was 2.20 and the average family size was 2.80.

In the town, the population was spread out, with 18.2% under the age of 18, 5.3% from 18 to 24, 28.0% from 25 to 44, 31.1% from 45 to 64, and 17.4% who were 65 years of age or older. The median age was 44 years. For every 100 females, there were 97.0 males. For every 100 females age 18 and over, there were 103.8 males.

The median income for a household in the town was $21,429, and the median income for a family was $27,500. Males had a median income of $30,313 versus $11,000 for females. The per capita income for the town was $11,381. There were 16.7% of families and 12.3% of the population living below the poverty line, including 9.4% of under eighteens and none of those over 64.
