= Beale =

- Language: Old French, Old English (Norman or Anglo-Saxon)

Origin
- Meaning: "handsome man"; "fair, beautiful"; "son of Bel"; "bee-hill"
- Region of origin: England

Other names
- Variant form: Beal

Beale is an English surname. At the time of the British Census of 1881, its relative frequency was highest in Dorset (6.3 times the British average), followed by Huntingdonshire, Hampshire, Sussex, Oxfordshire, Wiltshire, Warwickshire, Kent and Surrey.

The name Beale may refer to:

== People ==
- Anne Beale (1816–1900), British novelist and poet
- Anthony Beale (born 1967), American politician, alderman in Chicago
- Bernard Charles Beale (1830–1910), New Zealand doctor and politician
- Calvin Beale (1923–2008), American demographer
- Charles Lewis Beale (1824–1900), member of U.S. House of Representatives from New York
- Daniel Beale (1759–1842), Scottish merchant, brother of Thomas Beale
- Dorothea Beale (1831–1906), English teacher, founder of St. Hilda's College, Oxford
- Edith Bouvier Beale (1917–2002), American socialite, first cousin of Jacqueline Kennedy Onassis and Lee Radziwill
- Edward Fitzgerald Beale (1822–1893), American frontiersman and diplomat
- Fleur Beale (born 1945), New Zealand teenage fiction writer best known for her novel I am not Esther
- Francis Beale (writer) (fl. 1656), English author
- Francis Beale (MP) (born 1577), English politician
- Geoffrey Beale (1913–2009), British geneticist
- Gerard Beale (born 1990), New Zealand rugby league player
- Gregory Beale (born 1949), Reformed Christian theologian and seminary professor
- Helen Purdy Beale (1893–1976), US virologist
- Howard Beale (politician) (1898–1983), Australian politician and Ambassador to the United States
- Howard K. Beale (1899–1959), American historian and author
- Inga Beale (born 1963), CEO of Lloyd's of London
- Jack Beale (1917–2006), Australian politician
- Jake Beale, Canadian actor
- James Beale (disambiguation), multiple people
- John Beale (disambiguation), multiple people
- Jonathan Beale, British philosopher
- Joseph Beale (disambiguation), multiple people
- Julian Beale (1934–2021), Australian politician
- Kurtley Beale (born 1989), Australian rugby union player
- Lionel Smith Beale (1828–1906), British medical doctor and professor at King's College London
- Margaret Beale (1886–1969), British marine artist
- Maria Taylor Beale (1849–1929), American author
- Martin Beale (1928–1985), British pioneer of mathematical programming
- Mary Beale (1633–1699), English portrait painter
- Michael Beale (disambiguation), multiple people
- Octavius Beale (1850–1930), Irish piano manufacturer and philanthropist
- Percival Beale, Chief Cashier of the Bank of England from 1949 to 1955
- Phelan Beale (1881–1956), American attorney and sportsman
- Phelan Beale Jr. (1920–1993), American journalist and law expert
- Philippa Beale (born 1946), British artist
- Richard Beale (1920–2017), British actor
- Richard L. T. Beale (1819–1893), American lawyer, Congressman from Virginia, and brigadier general in Confederate States Army
- Sara Sun Beale (born 1949), American law professor
- Simon Russell Beale (born 1961), British actor
- Sophia Beale (1837–1920), English artist
- Theodore Beale (born c.1968) American writer
- Thomas Beale (c. 1775 – 1841), Scottish naturalist and opium speculator, brother of Daniel Beale
- Thomas Chaye Beale (19th century), Scottish merchant, cousin of Daniel and Thomas Beale
- Thomas J. Beale (fl. 1820s), American purported author of the Beale ciphers, allegedly stating the location of buried treasure
- Thomas Willert Beale (1828–1894), English writer, also wrote under the pseudonym Walter Maynard
- William Beale (1784–1854), British composer

As given name

- Beale M. Schmucker (1827–1888), American Lutheran leader and liturgical scholar

== Characters ==
- Bobby Beale, a fictional character in the British soap opera EastEnders
- Chloe Beale, a fictional character from the film Pitch Perfect
- Cindy Beale, a fictional character in the British soap opera EastEnders
- Elizabeth Beale, a fictional character in the British soap opera EastEnders
- Eric Beale, a fictional character from the TV series NCIS:LA
- Howard Beale, a fictional character from the film Network
- Ian Beale, a fictional character in the British soap opera EastEnders
- Jane Beale, a fictional character in the British soap opera EastEnders
- Kathy Beale, a fictional character in the British soap opera EastEnders
- Kenny Beale, a fictional character in the British soap opera EastEnders
- Laura Beale, a fictional character in the British soap opera EastEnders
- Livia Beale, a fictional character from the TV series Journeyman
- Lou Beale, a fictional character in the British soap opera EastEnders
- Louie Beale, a fictional character in the British soap opera EastEnders
- Lucy Beale, a fictional character in the British soap opera EastEnders
- Mel Owen, a fictional character in the British soap opera EastEnders
- Pete Beale, a fictional character in the British soap opera EastEnders
- Peter Beale, a fictional character in the British soap opera EastEnders
- Sharon Watts, a fictional character in the British soap opera EastEnders
- Stacy Beale, a fictional character from the TV series Tulsa King
- Steven Beale, a fictional character in the British soap opera EastEnders

== See also ==
- Beal (surname)
- Bealey, a surname
- Beall, a surname
- Beel (disambiguation)
- Bheel (disambiguation)
- Biehl, surname
