= James Beal =

James Beal may refer to:

- James Beal (boxer) (1929–1996), New Zealand boxer
- James Hartley Beal (1861–1945), Ohio educator, legislator, author, and pharmacist
- James Beal (cricketer) (1830–1904), Australian cricketer
- James Beal (reformer) (1829–1891), English land agent, auctioneer and political radical

== See also ==
- James Beale (disambiguation)
- James Beall (disambiguation)
