= Bil =

BIL or Bil may refer to:

== Mythology ==
- Bil (Norse mythology), sister of Hjúki, following the personified Moon, Máni, across the heavens
- Bil (Mandaeism), the Mandaean name for Jupiter

== People ==
- Bil Baird (1904–1987), American puppeteer
- Bil Dwyer (1907-1987), American cartoonist and humorist
- Bil Dwyer (born 1962), American stand-up comedian and game show host
- Bil Herd, computer designer
- Bil Keane (1922–2011), American cartoonist best known for his comic strip The Family Circus
- Bil Lepp (born 1970), American storyteller
- Bil Marinkovic (born 1973), Austrian blind Paralympic athlete
- Bil Zelman (born 1972), American photographer and director

== Transport ==
- Billingham railway station, Borough of Stockton-on-Tees, England, by station code
- Billings Logan International Airport, by IATA code

== Other ==
- Basic impulse insulation level, electrical term
- BIL (yacht)
- Banque Internationale à Luxembourg, one of the five major full-service banks in Luxembourg, and one of the major shareholders of Luxembourg's flag carrier airline Luxair
- Boolean Integrase Logic, a transcriptor based biological equivalent of electronic logic
- British & Irish Lions, a representative touring rugby union team composed of English, Welsh, Irish and Scottish players
- GL Limited, multinational corporation formerly known as Brierley Investments
- Infrastructure Investment and Jobs Act, a United States law commonly known as the Bipartisan Infrastructure Law
- brother-in-law

== See also ==
- Bill (disambiguation)
- Bank Indonesia Liquidity Support
- Beal (disambiguation)
- Beale
- Beall
- Beel (disambiguation)
- Bheel (disambiguation)
- Bhil people
