= William Beal =

William Beal may refer to:

- William Beal (writer) (1815–1870), English religious writer
- William James Beal (1833–1924), American botanist
- William Beal (cricketer) (1877–1964), Australian-born New Zealand cricketer

== See also ==
- William Beale (disambiguation)
- Beal (surname)
