= Biel (disambiguation) =

Biel/Bienne is a city in the canton of Berne, Switzerland.

Biel may also refer to:

== Places ==
- Biel, Valais, Switzerland, a village
- Biel, Gmina Ostrów Mazowiecka, Poland, a village
- Biel, Siedlce County, Poland, a village
- Biel, Warmian-Masurian Voivodeship, Poland, a village
- Biel, East Lothian, Scotland, a village
  - Biel Water, a river
  - Biel House, a historic house
- Biel, Trebišov District, Slovakia, a village and municipality
- Biel, Aragon, Spain, a municipality
- Biel District, Switzerland, of which Biel/Bienne is the seat
- Biel/Bienne (administrative district), an administrative district in the Canton of Bern, Switzerland.
- Lake Biel, Switzerland

== Transport ==
- Biel (Goms) railway station in Biel, Valais, Switzerland
- Biel Mett railway station in Biel/Bienne, Bern, Switzerland
- Biel/Bienne railway station in Biel/Bienne, Bern, Switzerland

== Other uses ==
- Biel (name), given name and surname
- Biel (footballer, born 2001), Gabriel Teixeira Aragão, Brazilian football attacking midfielder for Sporting CP
- Biel (footballer, born 2002), Luiz Gabriel de Oliveira Fonseca, Brazilian football attacking midfielder for Paysandu
- Biel (singer), Brazilian pop and funk singer
- Biel chess tournament, held in Biel, Switzerland
- Beirut International Exhibition & Leisure Center
- Bielschowsky stain, used in neuropathology and often abbreviated as biel

== See also ==
- Biel-Benken, a town in the canton of Basel-Land, Switzerland
