= Bheel =

Bheel may refer to:

- Bhil, a tribe from Central India
- Beel, a type of flood pond in the Lower Ganges – Brahmaputra flood plains
- Khadem (tribe), a caste from Ajmer, Rajasthan, India
- Krishan Bheel (born 1968), Hindu politician in Pakistan

== See also ==
- Beel (disambiguation)
- Beal (disambiguation)
- Bil (disambiguation)
- Beale
- Beall
