= Jeal =

Jeal is a surname. Notable people with the surname include:

- Tim Jeal (born 1945), British biographer and novelist
- Wendy Jeal (born 1960), British track and field athlete
- Alan Eric Jeal (died 2014), Died under unsolved circumstances

== See also ==
- Beal (surname)
