= William Beale (disambiguation) =

William Beale (1784–1854) was an English composer and baritone.

William Beale may also refer to:

- William Beale (college head) (died 1651), English academic and Royalist
- Sir William Beale, 1st Baronet (1839–1922), British barrister and politician
- William H. Beale (1920–1962), US Army Air Forces officer and CIA agent

== See also ==
- William Beal (disambiguation)
- Beale (surname)
