= Wołyńce =

Wołyńce may refer to the following places:

- Wołyńce, Masovian Voivodeship (east-central Poland)
- Wołyńce, Sejny County in Podlaskie Voivodeship (north-east Poland)
- Wołyńce, Sokółka County in Podlaskie Voivodeship (north-east Poland)
