= Pustki =

Pustki may refer to:

== Places ==
- Pustki, Masovian Voivodeship (east-central Poland)
- Pustki, Pomeranian Voivodeship (north Poland)
- Pustki, Puck County in Pomeranian Voivodeship (north Poland)
- Pustki, Tczew County in Pomeranian Voivodeship (north Poland)
- Pustki, Warmian-Masurian Voivodeship (north Poland)

== Music ==
- Pustki (band), Polish alternative rock band
