= Beal =

Beal may refer to:

== Places ==
=== United Kingdom ===
- Beal, Northumberland, England
- Beal, North Yorkshire, England

=== United States ===
- Beal, California
- Beal, Indiana
- Beal, Missouri
- Beal City, Michigan

== Other uses ==
- Beal (surname)
- Beal Aerospace, a launch vehicle development company
- Beal Bank, Plano, Texas
- Beal College, Bangor, Maine
- River Beal, a small river in Greater Manchester, England
- H.B. Beal Secondary School, a high school in London, Ontario
- Chicken Beal, Aboriginal Cuisine

== See also ==
- Beale (disambiguation)
- Beall, a surname
- Beals (disambiguation)
- Beel (disambiguation)
- Bheel (disambiguation)
- Biel (disambiguation)
