= Biel (surname) =

Biel is a German surname, derived from a place of residence named Bühl or from the word meaning 'axe', hatchet. It may also be a Polish surname derived from a nickname. The Polish word means "whiteness" and the nickname may be derived from paything of white color, as well as for a blond person or a person of unusually pale complexion. Notable people with the surname include:

- Ernst Biel (1934–2023), Austrian speed skater
- Eugene Biel-Bienne, Austrian-American painter
- Gabriel Biel (1420s–1495), German canon regular and scholar
- Jessica Biel (born 1982), American actress
- José Ángel Biel (born 1946), Spanish politician
- Joseph Biel (1859–1944), American farmer and politician from Wisconsin
- Julia Biel (born 1976), British singer, songwriter and musician
- Karl Emil Biel (1838–1915), German pioneer of photography and phototyping
- Michael von Biel (born 1937), German composer, cellist and artist
- Pep Biel (born 1996), Spanish footballer
- Tito Biel, South Sudanese revolutionary
- Ulrich Biel (1907–1996), German politician
- Unai Biel (born 2002), Spanish water polo player
- Walter Biel (1933–2024), Swiss journalist and politician
- Werner Biel (1927–2006), German rower
- Yiech Biel (born 1995), South Sudanese middle-distance runner

== See also ==
- Biel family with Ostoja coat of arms
- Beal (surname)
