= Żabokliki-Kolonia =

- Village
- Location within Poland
- Coordinates: 52°10′30″N 22°20′07″E
- Country: Poland
- Voivodeship: Masovian
- County: Siedlce
- Gmina: Siedlce

Żabokliki-Kolonia [ʐabɔˈkliki kɔˈlɔɲa] is a village in the administrative district of Gmina Siedlce, within Siedlce County, Masovian Voivodeship, in east-central Poland.
