= Carl Beal =

New Zealand cricketer

Personal information
- Full name: Carl Ernest Beal
- Born: 12 July 1887; Launceston, Tasmania, Australia
- Died: 16 August 1916 (aged 29); Melbourne, Victoria, Australia
- Relatives: William Beal (brother)

Domestic team information
- Years: Team
- 1906/07–1908/09: Otago
- 1913/14–1914/15: Canterbury

Career statistics
Competition	First-class
Matches	12
Runs scored	436
Batting average	24.22
100s/50s	1/1
Top score	105
Balls bowled	180
Wickets	3
Bowling average	37.00
5 wickets in innings	0
10 wickets in match	0
Best bowling	2/16
Catches/stumpings	7/–
- Source: Cricinfo, 24 March 2022

Carl Ernest Beal (12 July 1887 – 16 August 1916) was an Australian-born New Zealand cricketer. He played 12 matches of first-class cricket for Otago and Canterbury between 1906 and 1915.

In January 1914 Beal scored 105 for Canterbury against Wellington in the Plunket Shield, reaching his century in 110 minutes. In January 1915 he scored 242 not out playing for East Christchurch, a record score for the Christchurch club competition. Shortly afterwards he began to suffer from tuberculosis, and he returned to Melbourne with his wife. He died in Melbourne in August 1916 aged 29.

Beal's brother William also played for Otago and went on to umpire first-class matches in New Zealand.
