= Biel (name) =

Biel is both a surname and a given name. Notable people with the name include:

== Surname ==
- Biel (surname)

== Given name ==
- Biel (singer) (born 1996), Brazilian singer
- Biel (footballer, born 2002), Brazilian footballer
- Biel Ballester (born 1974), Spanish guitarist
- Biel Borra (born 2005), Andorran footballer
- Biel Company (footballer) (born 1992), Spanish footballer
- Biel Company (politician) (born 1963), Spanish politician
- Biel Farrés (born 2002), Spanish footballer
- Biel Medina (born 1980), Spanish footballer
- Biel Ribas (born 1985), Spanish footballer
- Biel Teixeira (born 2001), Brazilian footballer
- Biel Vicens (born 2004), Spanish footballer

== See also ==
- Biehl, surname
