= Sophia Beale =

British portrait painter (1837–1920)

Sarah Sophia Beale
- Born: 5 November 1837; London, England
- Died: 1920 (aged 82–83)
- Known for: Painting

Sarah Sophia Beale (5 November 1837 – 1920) was a British portrait painter and author who wrote about art and architecture.

== Biography ==
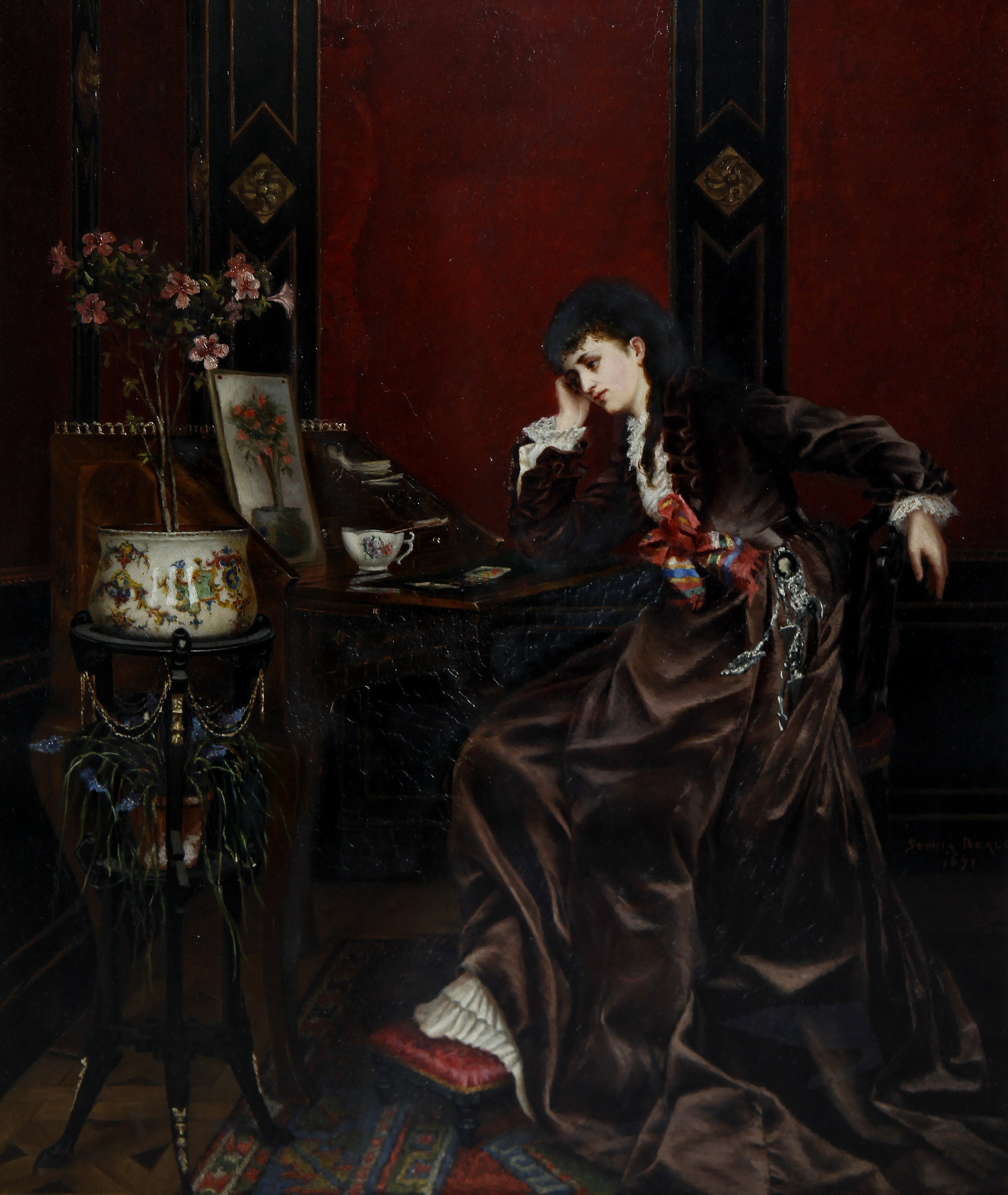
The pleasures of art by Sarah Sophia Beale, 1871

Beale was born in London. Her father was the surgeon Lionel John Beale and her mother was Frances Smith. Her brother, Lionel Smith Beale, was a surgeon and her sister, Ellen Brooker Beale, was also an artist and the two sisters would often work together.

Both Sophia and Ellen Beale attended Queen's College, London and took lessons at a private art school run by the artist Matthew Leigh. They spent considerable periods in the National Gallery and the British Museum copying Old Masters and antiquities. From 1860 to 1867 the two sisters had a studio in Covent Garden on Long Acre.

In 1869, and again in 1872, Beale travelled to Paris where she studied at Charles Joshua Chaplin's studio and also worked as a supervisor at another studio. When she returned to London, Beale used the money she had earned to open an art school on Albany Street near Regent's Park. The techniques she had learned in Paris were in considerable demand at the time.

In 1889 she was among the 2,000 signatories to a declaration supporting women's suffrage and she also advocated for the Royal Academy and the universities to allow greater access to women.

Although during her career the major exhibition space open to Beale was the Sussex Street gallery of the Society of British Artists where she showed some thirty works, she also had eight works accepted by the Royal Academy between 1863 and 1887. Between 1868 and 1882 she exhibited at the Royal Hibernian Academy and with the Society of Women Artists from 1860 to 1881. In 1908 Beale published her autobiography, Recollections of a Spinster Aunt.

== Published works ==
Published works by Beale include,

- The Louvre, a complete and concise handbook to all the collections of the museum, being an abridgement of the French official catalogues, 1883.
- The Amateur's Guide to Architecture, 1887.
- The Churches of Paris from Clovis to Charles X, 1893.
- Recollections of a Spinster Aunt, 1908.
