= Wołyńce-Kolonia =

- Village
- Location within Poland
- Coordinates: 52°07′31″N 22°12′38″E
- Country: Poland
- Voivodeship: Masovian
- County: Siedlce
- Gmina: Siedlce
- Population: 414

Wołyńce-Kolonia [vɔˈwɨɲt͡sɛ kɔˈlɔɲa] is a village in the administrative district of Gmina Siedlce, within Siedlce County, Masovian Voivodeship, in east-central Poland.
