= Beeley (surname) =

Beeley is a surname. Notable people with the surname include:

- Harold Beeley (1909–2001), British diplomat and historian
- John Beeley (1918–1941), English recipient of the Victoria Cross
- Shaun Beeley (born 1988), British footballer
- Thomas Beeley (1833–1908), founder of Manchester boilermakers Thomas Beeley and Son; (see Fairbairn-Beeley boiler).

== See also ==
- Beeley
- Bealey
