= Nowe Iganie =

- Village
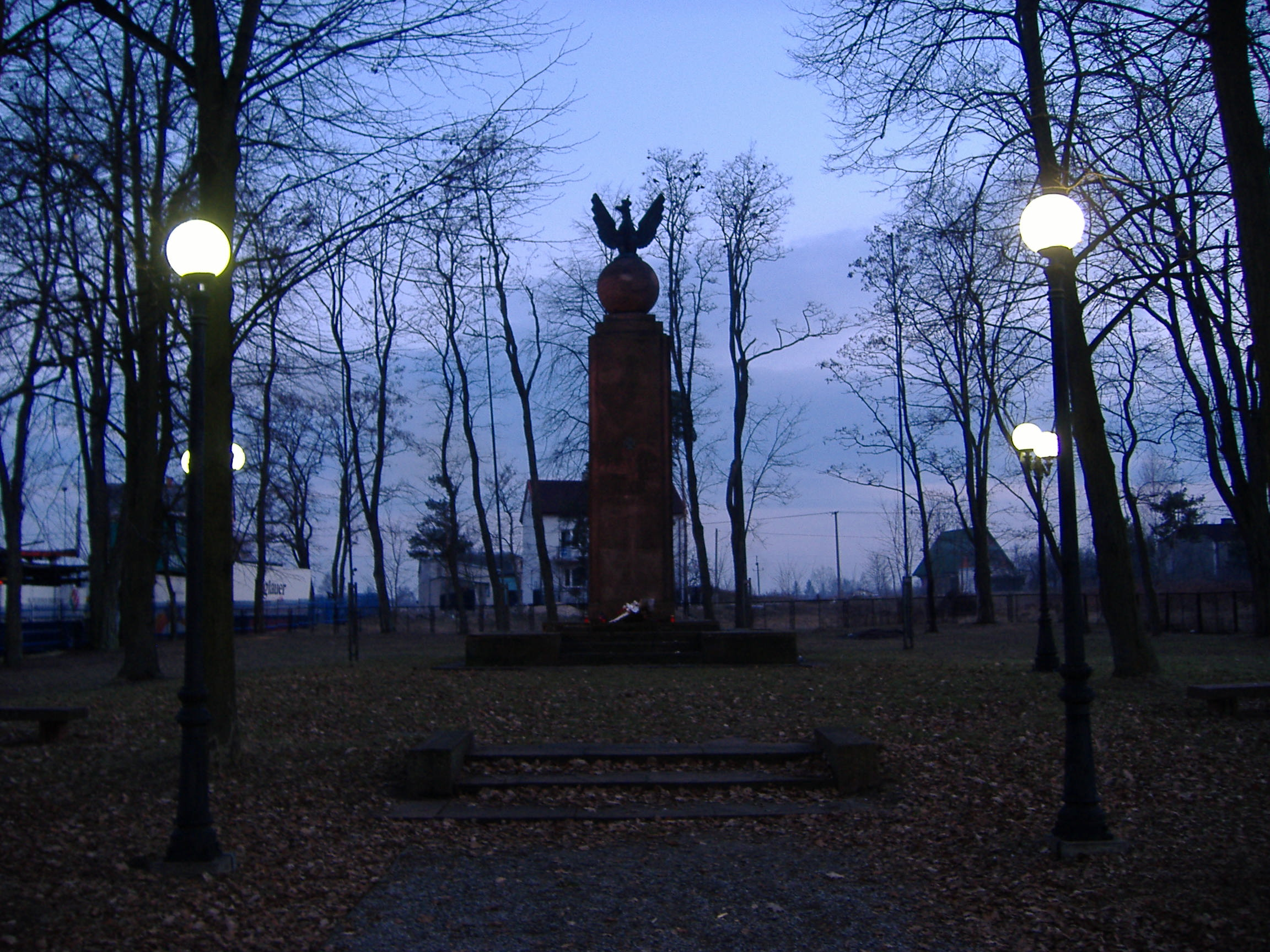
- Commemorative monument of the Battle of Iganie

- Location within Poland
- Coordinates: 52°10′22″N 22°11′56″E
- Country: Poland
- Voivodeship: Masovian
- County: Siedlce
- Gmina: Siedlce
- Population: 1,162

Nowe Iganie [ˈnɔvɛ iˈɡaɲɛ] is a village in the administrative district of Gmina Siedlce, within Siedlce County, Masovian Voivodeship, in east-central Poland.
