= Żelków-Kolonia =

- Village
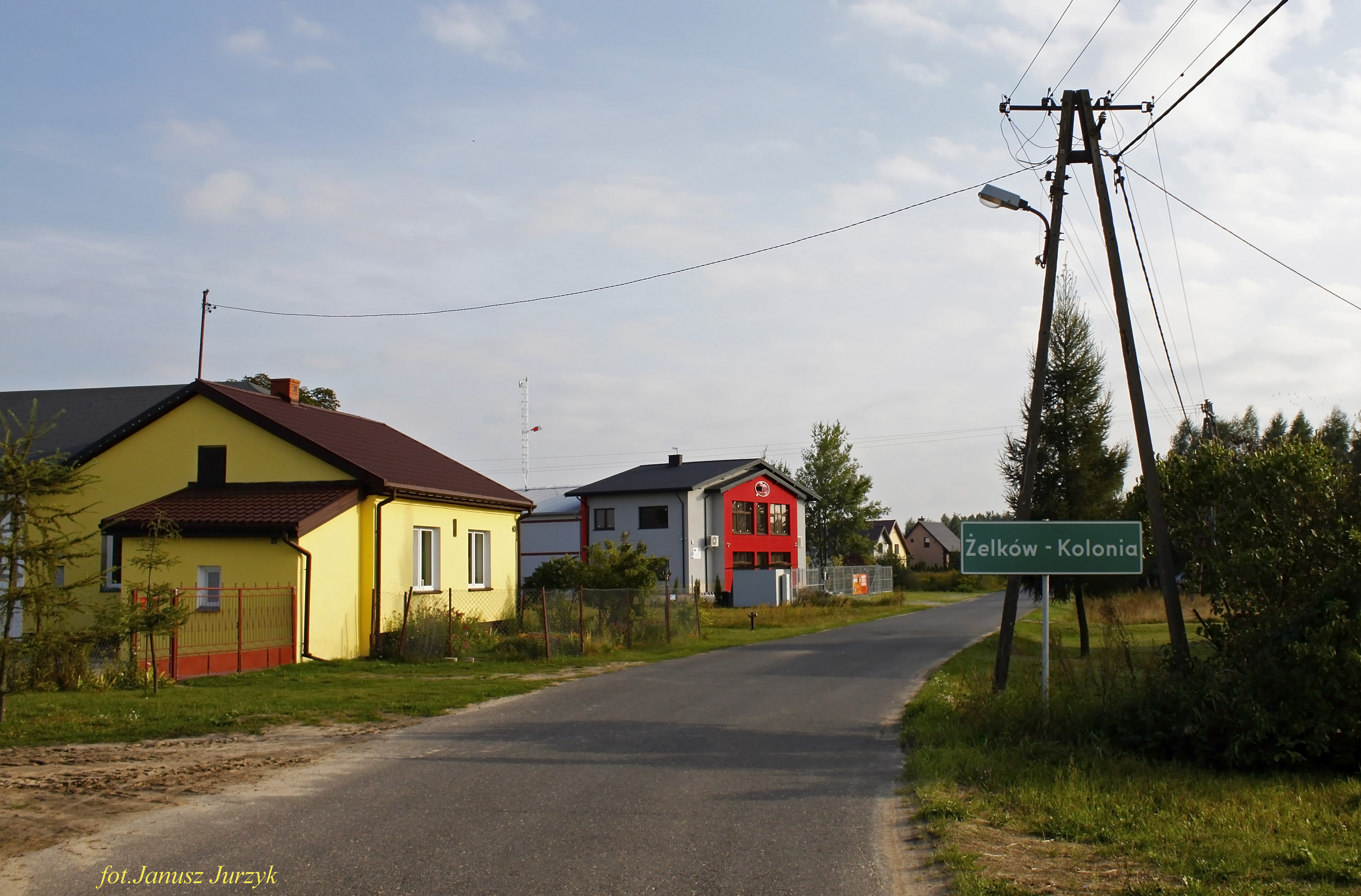

- Location within Poland
- Coordinates: 52°08′27″N 22°12′26″E
- Country: Poland
- Voivodeship: Masovian
- County: Siedlce
- Gmina: Siedlce
- Population (approx.): 1,200

Żelków-Kolonia [ˈʐɛlkuf kɔˈlɔɲa] is a village in the administrative district of Gmina Siedlce, within Siedlce County, Masovian Voivodeship, in east-central Poland.
