= Opole Świerczyna =

- Village
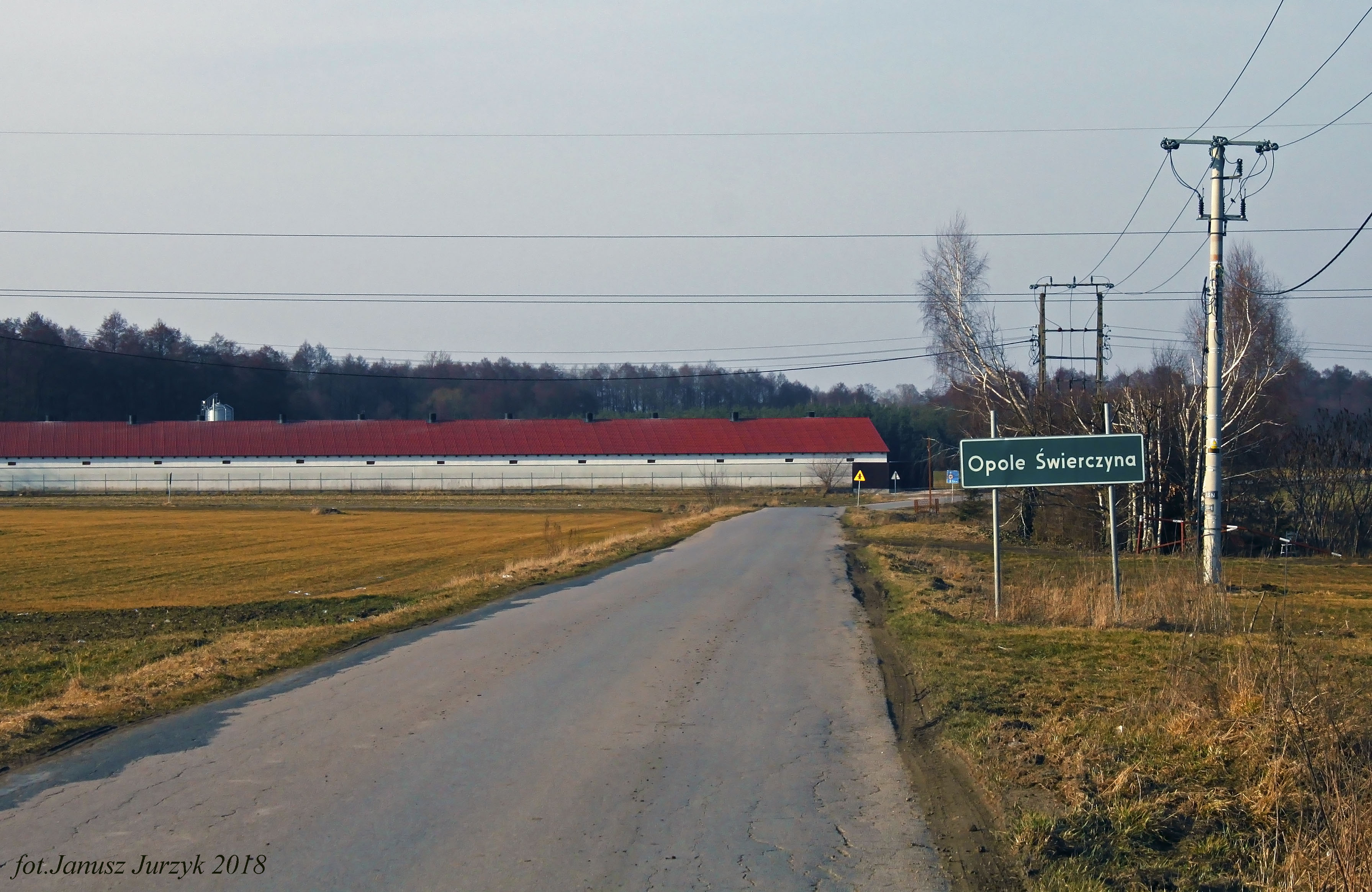
- Street and road sign of Opole Świerczyna

- Location within Poland
- Coordinates: 52°11′43″N 22°12′45″E
- Country: Poland
- Voivodeship: Masovian
- County: Siedlce
- Gmina: Siedlce
- Population: 44

Opole Świerczyna (Polish pronunciation: [ɔˈpɔlɛ ɕfjɛrˈt͡ʂɨna]) is a village in the administrative district of Gmina Siedlce, within Siedlce County, Masovian Voivodeship, in east-central Poland.
