= Marion Yorck von Wartenburg =

German resistance fighter

Marion Gräfin Yorck von Wartenburg (née Winter; 14 June 1904 – 13 April 2007) was a German activist, lawyer, jurist, judge and author. She was a resistance fighter against the Nazis and member of the Kreisau Circle.

== Biography ==
Marion Winter was born in Berlin, the third of six children of a civil servant who had charge of the administration of the national theatres. She was educated at the Grunewald-Gymnasium in Berlin (now the Walther-Rathenau-Oberschule). A fellow student was future theologian Dietrich Bonhoeffer. She studied jurisprudence and earned her Juris Doctor in 1929. She completed a doctorate and began to train as an assistant judge that year.

In 1930, she married Peter Yorck von Wartenburg, a cousin of Claus von Stauffenberg. Yorck, also a lawyer, was a descendant of the Prussian field marshal whose defiance of Napoleon had freed his country from the French yoke. Together with her husband, Marion was active with the Kreisau Circle, an opposition group against the National Socialist regime, in 1933. Her husband was executed after the bungled assassination attempt on Hitler, and Marion spent three months in prison. She was jailed again in Poland for another three months and beaten by communist guards who refused to accept that she was not a Nazi.

After World War II, Yorck worked in East Berlin as a jurist. In 1946, she was nominated as a judge at Amtsgericht Lichterfelde in West Berlin by the Allies. In 1952, she became the first female head of a juried court, and, in 1969, she led the 9th Große Strafkammer of the regional superior court in Berlin. In 1984 she published a brief memoir, Die Stärke der Stille, translated into English in 2000 as The Power of Solitude.

After her husband's death she was a lifelong living partner of Ulrich Biel, a CDU politician who died in 1996. They lived together for some 50 years. She died in Berlin in 2007, aged 102. She had no children.
