= Beall =

Beall /ˈbɛl/ is a surname. Notable people with the surname include:

- Benjamin Lloyd Beall (1801–1863), US Army officer
- Bob Beall (born 1948), American baseball player
- Daryl Beall (born 1946), American politician
- George Beall (1729–1807), landowner whose partial holdings were ceded to establish Georgetown in Washington, D.C.
- George Beall (attorney) (1937–2017), prosecutor who brought down U.S. Vice President Spiro Agnew
- James Andrew Beall (1866–1929), American politician, represented Texas in the U.S. House of Representatives, 1903 to 1915
- James Glenn Beall (1894–1971), U.S. Senator from Maryland
- Jeffrey Beall, American librarian
- Jim Beall (California politician) (born 1952), American politician
- Jo Beall (born 1952), British academic specialising in development studies and economic development
- John Glenn Beall Jr. (1927–2006), U.S. Senator from Maryland
- John Yates Beall (1835–1865), Confederate privateer and spy
- Johnny Beall (1882–1926), American baseball player
- Lester Beall (1903–1969), American graphic designer
- Lloyd J. Beall (1808–1887), American military officer and paymaster of U.S. Army, Commandant of the Confederate States Marine Corps
- Martha Beall Mitchell (1918–1976), American wife of John Mitchell, U.S. Attorney General under President Richard Nixon
- Mary Stevens Beall (1854–1917), American historian, writer, librarian
- Rezin Beall (1723–1809), general from Maryland during the American Revolutionary War
- Reasin Beall (1769–1843), Ohio congressman and militia general during the War of 1812
- Robert Beall (sculptor) (1836–1892) sculptor of fonts, pulpits and reredoses
- Samuel Beall (1807–1868), American politician, second Lieutenant Governor of Wisconsin
- Walter Beall (1899–1959), American baseball player
- William Beall (1825–1883), brigadier general in the Confederate States Army
- William C. Beall (1911–1994) Pulitzer Prize winning photographer

== See also ==
- Beall Island, Antarctica
- Beall Woods State Park, Wabash County, Illinois, U.S.
- Beallsville, Pennsylvania, borough in Washington County, Pennsylvania, U.S.
- Bealls (Florida) (pronounced belz), Florida-based department store chain founded by Robert M. Beall
- Bealls (Texas) (pronounced belz), Texas-based department store chain founded by brothers Archie and Robbie Beall, later included brother, Willie Beall
- Beall High School (pronounced bel), was a public high school in Frostburg, Maryland
- Beal (disambiguation)
- Beale (disambiguation)
- Beel (disambiguation)
- Bheel (disambiguation)
- Bil (disambiguation)
