= Pruszynek =

- Village
- Location within Poland
- Coordinates: 52°11′38″N 22°23′58″E
- Country: Poland
- Voivodeship: Masovian
- County: Siedlce
- Gmina: Siedlce
- Population: 245

Pruszynek [pruˈʂɨnɛk] is a village in the administrative district of Gmina Siedlce, within Siedlce County, Masovian Voivodeship, in east-central Poland.
