= Ostrówek, Siedlce County =

Village in Gmina Siedlce, Poland

Ostrówek
- Village
- Location within Poland
- Coordinates: 52°11′40″N 22°11′20″E
- Country: Poland
- Voivodeship: Masovian
- County: Siedlce
- Gmina: Siedlce
- Population: 74

Ostrówek [ɔsˈtruvɛk] is a village in the administrative district of Gmina Siedlce, within Siedlce County, Masovian Voivodeship, in east-central Poland.
