= Chodów, Masovian Voivodeship =

Chodów
- Village
- Location within Poland
- Coordinates: 52°13′N 22°14′E
- Country: Poland
- Voivodeship: Masovian
- County: Siedlce
- Gmina: Siedlce
- Population: 1,080

Chodów [ˈxɔduf] is a village in the administrative district of Gmina Siedlce, within Siedlce County, Masovian Voivodeship, in east-central Poland.
