= Jagodnia, Masovian Voivodeship =

Jagodnia
- Village
- Location within Poland
- Coordinates: 52°12′14″N 22°18′01″E
- Country: Poland
- Voivodeship: Masovian
- County: Siedlce
- Gmina: Siedlce
- Population: 120

Jagodnia [jaˈɡɔdɲa] is a village in the administrative district of Gmina Siedlce, within Siedlce County, Masovian Voivodeship, in east-central Poland.
