= Białki, Siedlce County =

Białki
- Village
- Location within Poland
- Coordinates: 52°7′51″N 22°17′31″E
- Country: Poland
- Voivodeship: Masovian
- County: Siedlce
- Gmina: Siedlce
- Population: 721

Białki [ˈbjau̯ki] is a village in the administrative district of Gmina Siedlce, within Siedlce County, Masovian Voivodeship, in east-central Poland.
