= Stare Opole =

- Village
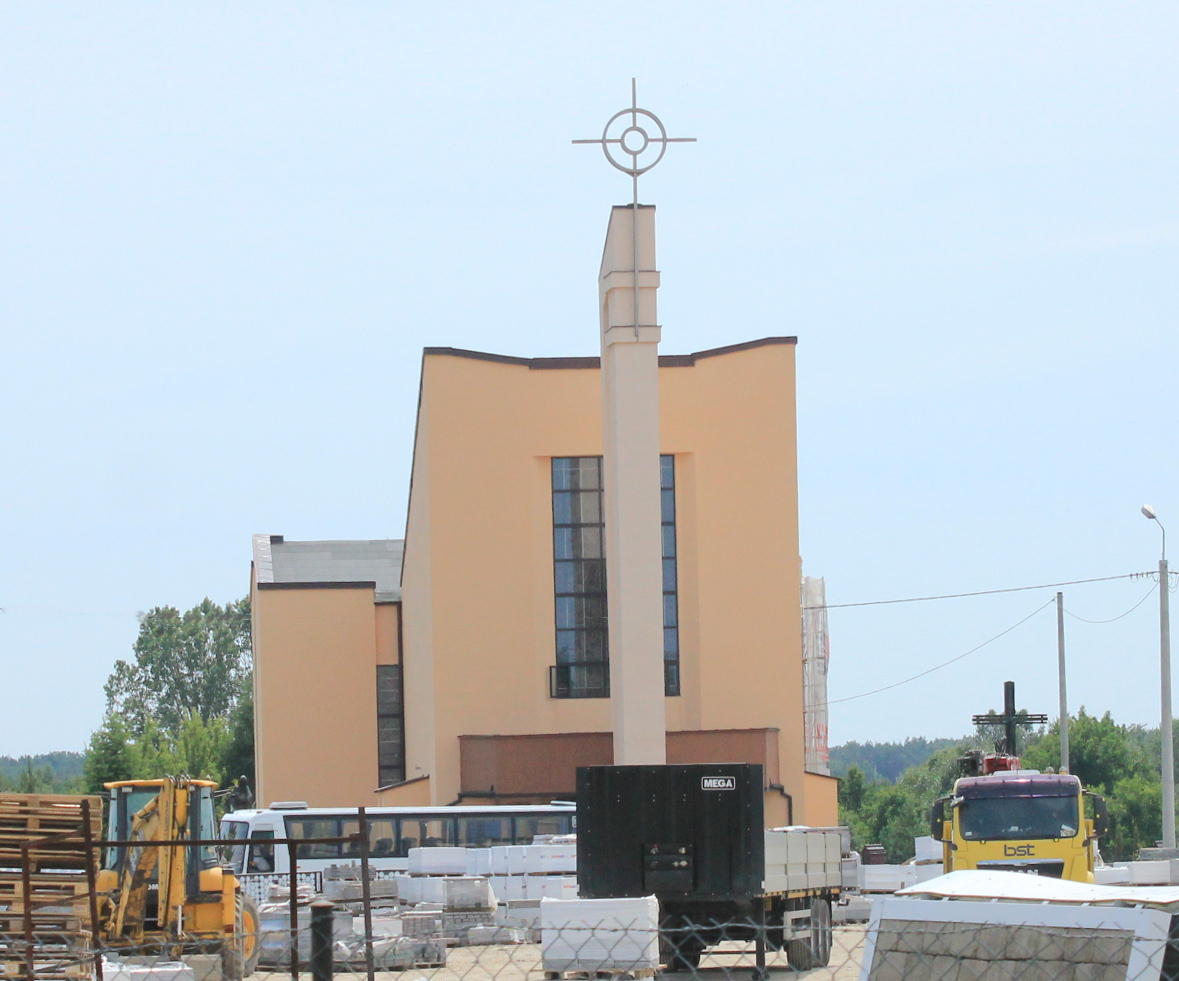

- Location within Poland
- Coordinates: 52°9′54″N 22°12′1″E
- Country: Poland
- Voivodeship: Masovian
- County: Siedlce
- Gmina: Siedlce
- Population: 727

Stare Opole [ˈstarɛ ɔˈpɔlɛ] is a village in the administrative district of Gmina Siedlce, within Siedlce County, Masovian Voivodeship, in east-central Poland.
