= Purzec =

- Village
- Location within Poland
- Coordinates: 52°13′N 22°17′E
- Country: Poland
- Voivodeship: Masovian
- County: Siedlce
- Gmina: Siedlce
- Population: 179
- Website: www.purzec.prv.pl

Purzec [ˈpuʐɛt͡s] is a village in the administrative district of Gmina Siedlce, within Siedlce County, Masovian Voivodeship, in east-central Poland.
