= Rakowiec, Siedlce County =

Rakowiec
- Village
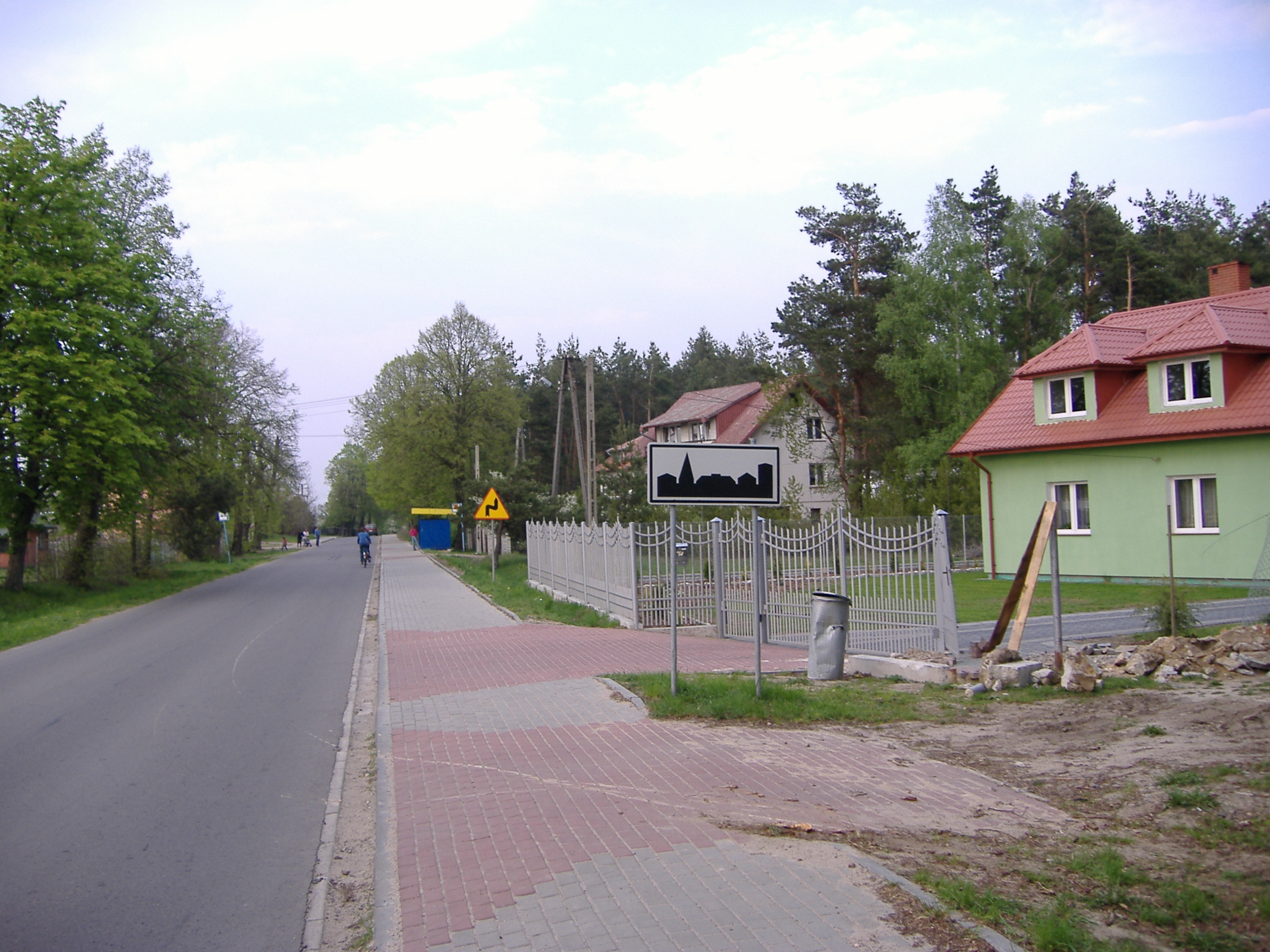
- Street of Rakowiec

- Location within Poland
- Coordinates: 52°07′52″N 22°14′12″E
- Country: Poland
- Voivodeship: Masovian
- County: Siedlce
- Gmina: Siedlce
- Population: 360

Rakowiec [raˈkɔvjɛt͡s] is a village in the administrative district of Gmina Siedlce, within Siedlce County, Masovian Voivodeship, in east-central Poland.
