= Golice-Kolonia =

- Village
- Location within Poland
- Coordinates: 52°12′29″N 22°21′42″E
- Country: Poland
- Voivodeship: Masovian
- County: Siedlce
- Gmina: Siedlce

Golice-Kolonia [ɡɔˈlit͡sɛ kɔˈlɔɲa] is a village in the administrative district of Gmina Siedlce, within Siedlce County, Masovian Voivodeship, in east-central Poland.
