= Nowe Opole =

- Village
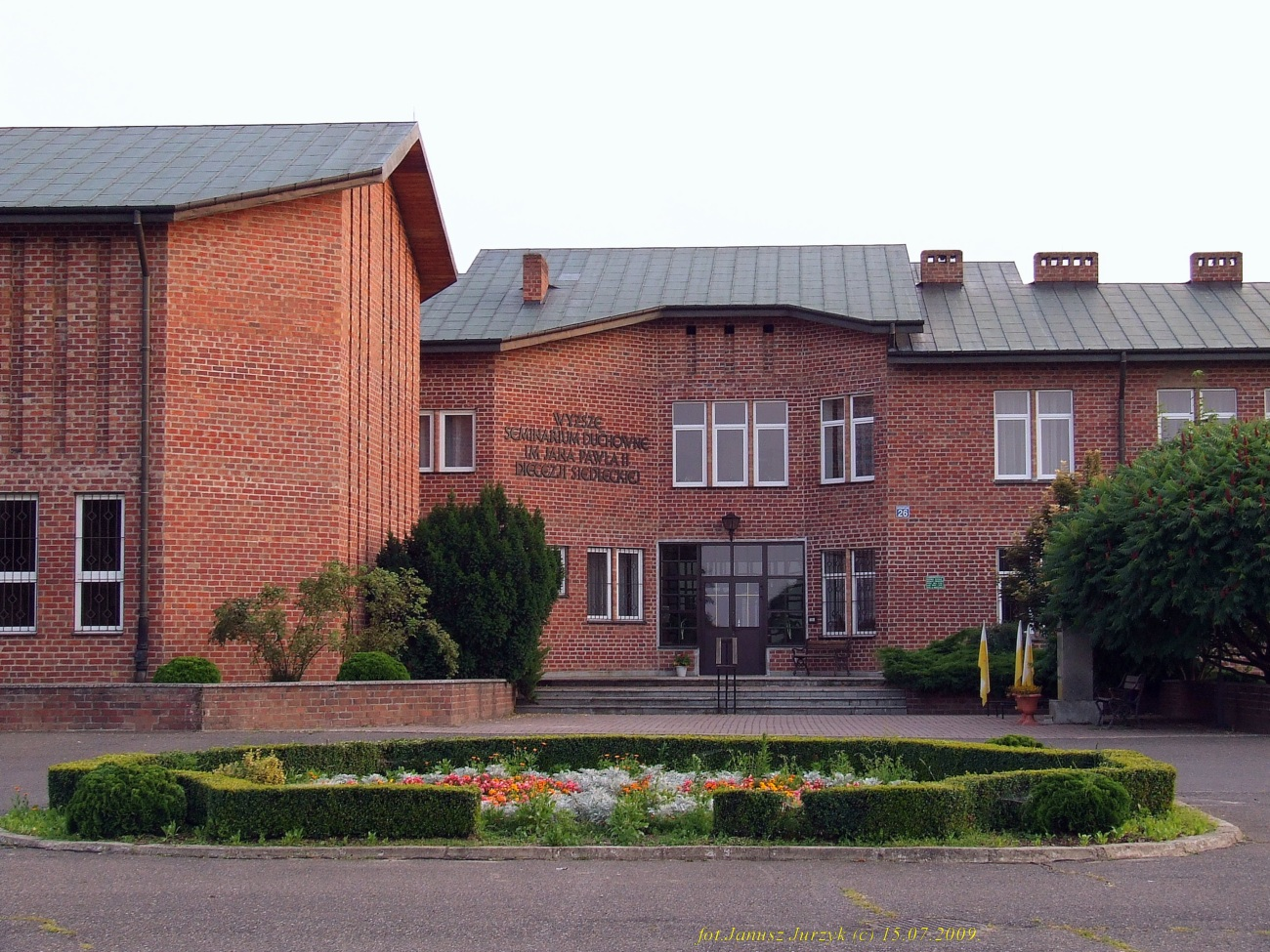
- Seminary

- Location within Poland
- Coordinates: 52°10′49″N 22°10′55″E
- Country: Poland
- Voivodeship: Masovian
- County: Siedlce
- Gmina: Siedlce

Population
  - Total: 800
- Time zone: UTC+1 (CET)
  - Summer (DST): UTC+2 (CEST)
- Vehicle registration: WSI

Nowe Opole [ˈnɔvɛ ɔˈpɔlɛ] is a village in the administrative district of Gmina Siedlce, within Siedlce County, Masovian Voivodeship, in east-central Poland.

The seminary of the Roman Catholic Diocese of Siedlce is located in Nowe Opole.

There is an Italian military cemetery in the village.
