= Gmina Siedlce =

Gmina Siedlce Siedlce Commune
- Gmina
- Coat of arms
- Interactive map of Gmina Siedlce
- Coordinates (Siedlce): 52°9′54″N 22°16′17″E
- Country: Poland
- Voivodeship: Masovian
- County: Siedlce County
- Seat: Siedlce

Area
  - Total: 141.54 km^{2} (54.65 sq mi)

Population (2014)
  - Total: 17,506
  - Density: 123.68/km^{2} (320.34/sq mi)
- Website: http://www.ugsiedlce.pl

Gmina Siedlce is a rural gmina (administrative district) in Siedlce County, Masovian Voivodeship, in east-central Poland. Its seat is the town of Siedlce, although the town is not part of the territory of the gmina.

The gmina covers an area of 141.54 square kilometres (54.6 sq mi), and as of 2006 its total population is 15,893 (17,506 in 2014).

== Villages ==
Gmina Siedlce contains the villages and settlements of Białki, Biel, Błogoszcz, Chodów, Golice, Golice-Kolonia, Grabianów, Grubale, Jagodnia, Joachimów, Nowe Iganie, Nowe Opole, Opole Świerczyna, Osiny, Ostrówek, Pruszyn, Pruszyn-Pieńki, Pruszynek, Purzec, Pustki, Rakowiec, Stare Iganie, Stare Opole, Stok Lacki, Stok Lacki-Folwark, Strzała, Topórek, Ujrzanów, Wólka Leśna, Wołyńce, Wołyńce-Kolonia, Żabokliki, Żabokliki-Kolonia, Żelków-Kolonia and Żytnia.

== Neighbouring gminas ==
Gmina Siedlce is bordered by the city of Siedlce and by the gminas of Kotuń, Mokobody, Mordy, Skórzec, Sokołów Podlaski, Suchożebry, Wiśniew and Zbuczyn.
