= Pruszyn-Pieńki =

- Village
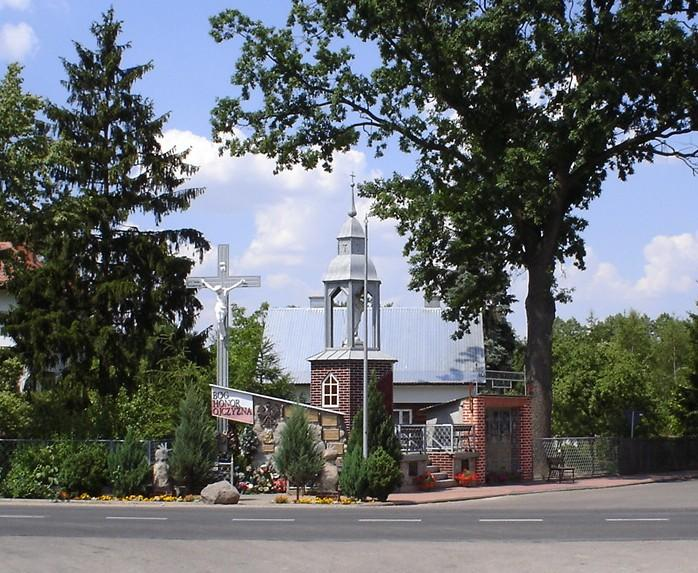

- Location within Poland
- Coordinates: 52°10′20″N 22°23′35″E
- Country: Poland
- Voivodeship: Masovian
- County: Siedlce
- Gmina: Siedlce
- Population: 353

Pruszyn-Pieńki [ˈpruʂɨn ˈpjɛɲki] is a village in the administrative district of Gmina Siedlce, within Siedlce County, Masovian Voivodeship, in east-central Poland.

The population is 353.
