= Pruszyn, Siedlce County =

Pruszyn
- Village
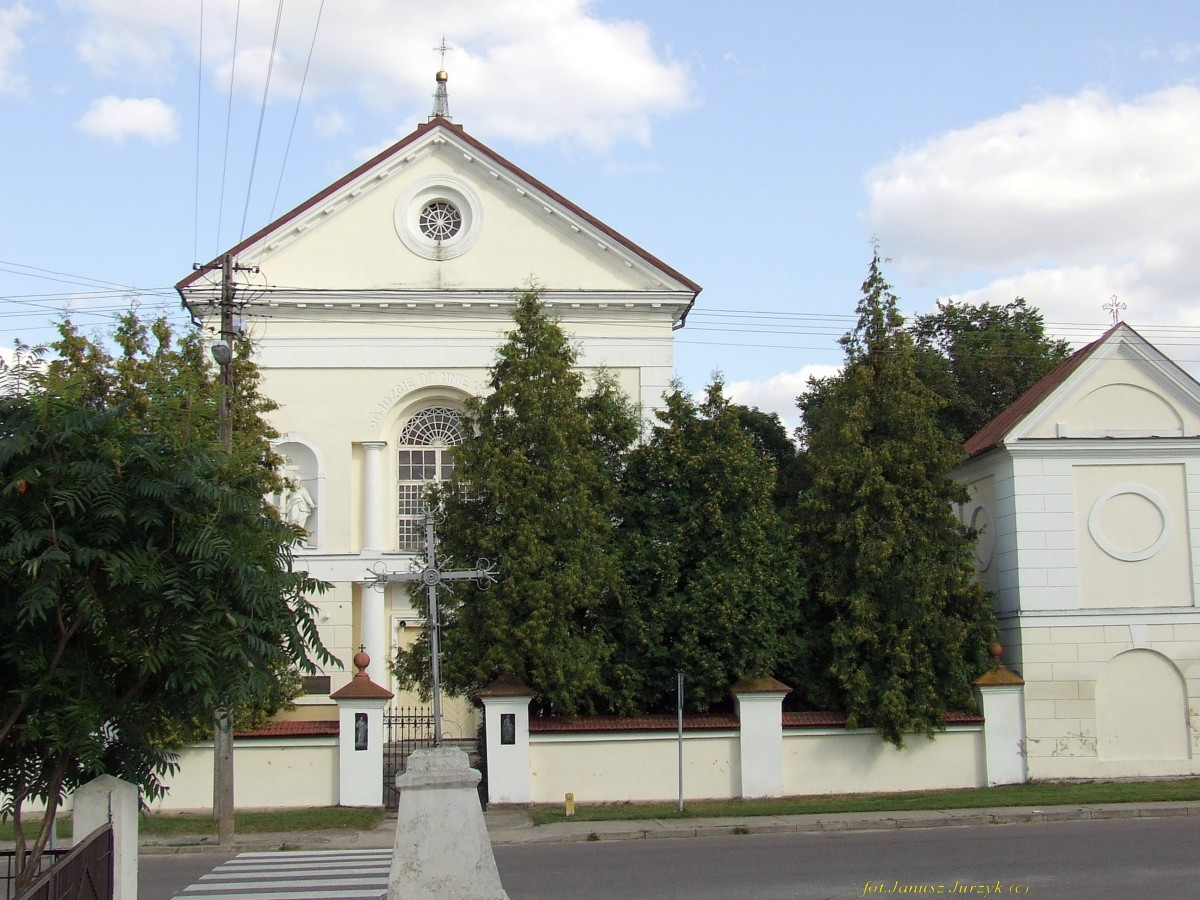

- Location within Poland
- Coordinates: 52°11′N 22°25′E
- Country: Poland
- Voivodeship: Masovian
- County: Siedlce
- Gmina: Siedlce
- Population: 353

Pruszyn [ˈpruʂɨn] is a village in the administrative district of Gmina Siedlce, within Siedlce County, Masovian Voivodeship, in east-central Poland.
