= Bealey =

Bealey is a surname and occasional given name. Notable people with this name include:

- Frank Bealey (1922–2013), British political scientist
- Samuel Bealey (1821–1909), British-born politician in Canterbury, New Zealand
- Herbert Bealey Adshead (1862–1932), British-born farmer, author and politician in Canada
- Samuel Bealey Harrison (1802–1867), British-born joint premier of the Province of Canada

== See also ==
- Bealey River, in Canterbury, NZ, named after Samuel Bealey; there was a settlement named Bealey by this river
- Bealeyia, a genus of spiders
- Beale
- Beeley (surname)
