= Stok Lacki-Folwark =

- Village
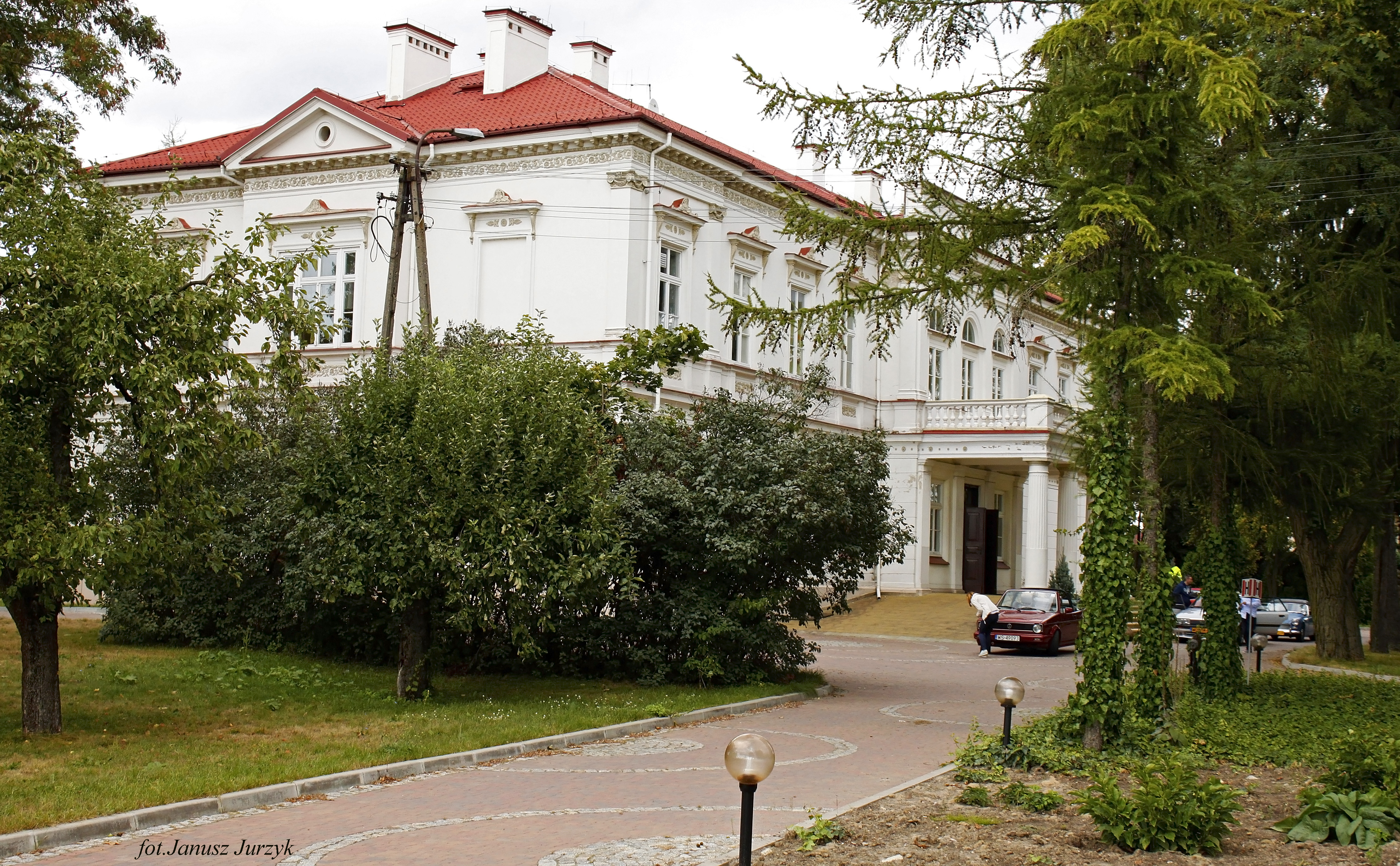

- Location within Poland
- Coordinates: 52°09′43″N 22°20′43″E
- Country: Poland
- Voivodeship: Masovian
- County: Siedlce
- Gmina: Siedlce
- Population: 853

Stok Lacki-Folwark [ˈstɔk ˈlat͡ski ˈfɔlvark] is a village in the administrative district of Gmina Siedlce, within Siedlce County, Masovian Voivodeship, in east-central Poland.
