= Stok Lacki =

- Village
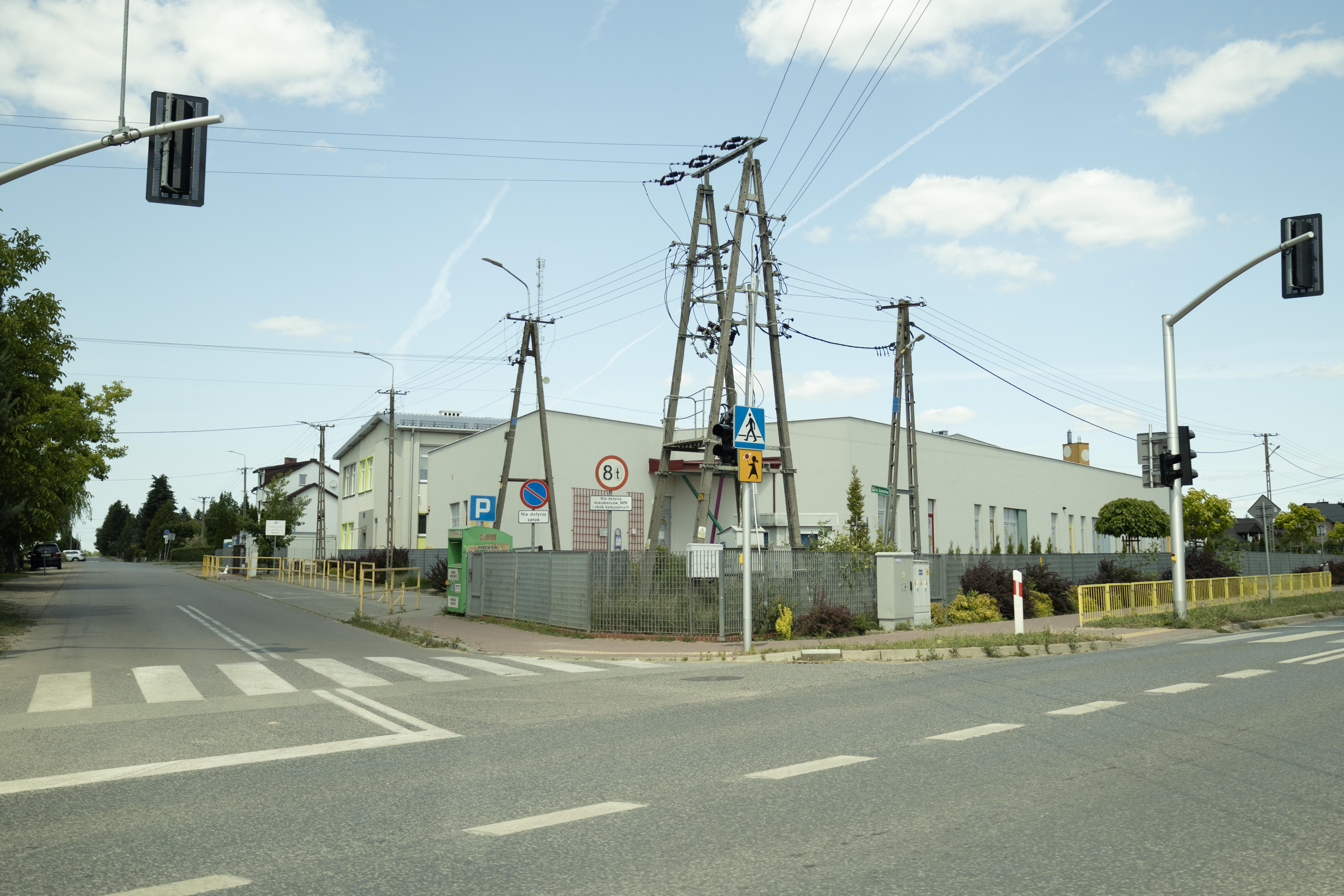

- Location within Poland
- Coordinates: 52°10′N 22°21′E
- Country: Poland
- Voivodeship: Masovian
- County: Siedlce
- Gmina: Siedlce
- Population: 721

Stok Lacki [ˈstɔk ˈlat͡ski] is a village in the administrative district of Gmina Siedlce, within Siedlce County, Masovian Voivodeship, in east-central Poland.
