= Strzała, Masovian Voivodeship =

Strzała
- Village
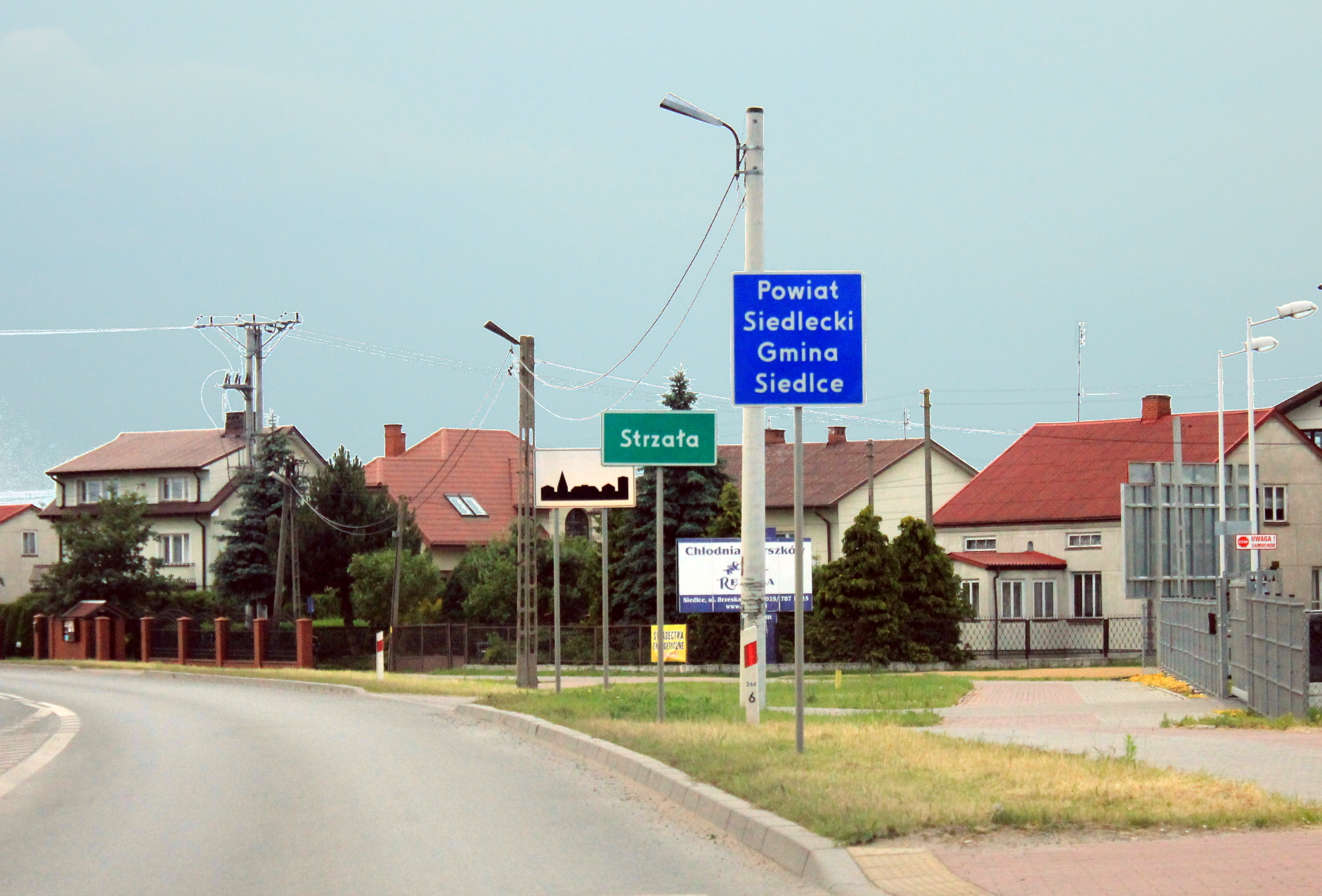

- Location within Poland
- Coordinates: 52°12′N 22°16′E
- Country: Poland
- Voivodeship: Masovian
- County: Siedlce
- Gmina: Siedlce
- Population: 1,054

Strzała [ˈstʂawa] is a village in the administrative district of Gmina Siedlce, within Siedlce County, Masovian Voivodeship, in east-central Poland.

According to documents of Łuków county from 1552, Strzała was the gentry village and was included in the Siedlce wealth of Ogiński's princes.
