= James Beale =

James Beale may refer to:

- James M. H. Beale (1786–1866), U.S. Representative from Virginia
- James Beale (artist), British artist
- James Beale (athlete) (1881–1968), track and field athlete
- James Thomas Beale (born 1947), American mathematician
- Africanus Horton (1835–1883), also known as James Beale, writer and folklorist from Sierra Leone

== See also ==
- James Beall (disambiguation)
