= James Beall =

James Beall may refer to:

- James Andrew Beall (1866–1929), Democratic United States congressman from Texas
- J. Glenn Beall (1894–1971), Republican United States senator from Maryland
- Jim Beall (California politician) (born 1951), Democratic state senator from California

== See also ==
- Lloyd James Beall (1808–1887), commandant of the Confederate States Marine Corps
- James Beale (disambiguation)
