= Jonathan Beale =

British philosopher

- Parent: James Beale
- Awards: Fellow of the Royal Society of Arts

Education
- Education: University of Reading (PhD, 2014)

Philosophical work
- Era: 21st-century philosophy
- Region: Western philosophy
- Institutions: Harvard University; University of Oxford (academic visitor); Eton College (researcher-in-residence)
- Main interests: human flourishing, philosophy of education, flow, philosophy of science, Ludwig Wittgenstein's thought
- Website: drjonbeale.com

Jonathan Beale is a British philosopher, researcher and educator whose work centres on human flourishing, optimal performance, and the philosophy of education. He is a Research Affiliate at the Human Flourishing Program at Harvard University.

== Books ==
- Jonathan Beale and Ian James Kidd (eds.), Wittgenstein and Scientism, Routledge, 2017, ISBN 9781138829398.
- Jonathan Beale and Christina Easton (eds.), The Future of Education: Reimagining its Aims and Responsibilities, Oxford University Press, forthcoming, ISBN 9780197669730
- Julia Harrington, Jonathan Beale, Amy Fancourt and Catherine Lutz (eds.), The 'BrainCanDo' Handbook of Teaching and Learning: Practical Strategies to Bring Psychology and Neuroscience into the Classroom, David Fulton Publishers, 2020, ISBN 9780429586699
