= James Beale (artist) =

British artist

James Beale RE RWA
- Born: 1948 (age 76–77); England
- Education: Gloucestershire College of Art & Design; Chelsea School of Art
- Known for: Printmaking, painting
- Children: Jonathan Beale
- Elected: Royal West of England Academy; Royal Society of Painter-Printmakers
- Website: https://www.jamesbeale.com/

James Beale RE RWA (born 1948) is a British printmaker and painter, known for his work in etching, aquatint, and other intaglio processes. He is a member of the Royal Society of Painter-Printmakers and an Academician of the Royal West of England Academy. Beale has received several national printmaking awards (including Windsor & Newton Outstanding Printmaker Award (1985) and Taylor Space Brothers Printmaking Award (1997)) and his work has been exhibited widely in the United Kingdom and abroad.

== Exhibitions ==
- Solo exhibitions include Gallery 24 (Dorset, 1972); Stockwood Art Centre (Bristol, 1974); Park Gallery (Cheltenham, 1987); Selly Manor Museum (Birmingham, 1994).
- Group exhibitions at the Royal Academy of Arts (London) and Ashmolean Museum (Oxford).

== Collections ==
His works are held in public and private collections in the United Kingdom, France, Canada, Japan, the United States, and Australia, including the Royal Collection at Buckingham Palace.
