= Krishan Bheel =

Pakistani Hindu politician

Krishan Bheel کرشن بھیل
- Born: 1968 (age 57–58); Hyderabad, Sindh
- Occupation: Politician

Krishan Bheel (Urdu: کرشن بھیل) (born in 1968) is a Pakistani politician. He is one of the few Hindu politicians in Pakistan and belongs to the Pakistan Muslim League (N).

== Early life ==
He was born in Hyderabad, Sindh, Pakistan on March 1, 1968, into a Sindhi Hindu family. He received his degree from Sindh University in 1990.

== Slapping incident ==
In Pakistan's parliament, Bheel slapped a politician. During discussions, a member of Bheel's party condemned Pervez Musharraf. An opposing politician, Qari Gul Rehman recited a qaseeda in favour of Musharraf, and was then heckled by members of Bheel's party. After proceedings Rehman, approached Bheel and called him Hindu in a derogatory manner. Bheel then slapped him three times before the fight was broken up.
