= Beal, Missouri =

Extinct hamlet in Missouri, U.S.

Coordinates: 37°06′49″N 91°05′45″W

Beal is an extinct town in southeastern Shannon County, in the U.S. state of Missouri. The GNIS classifies it as a populated place. The community sits above the south bank of the Current River. The Beal State Conservation Area lies adjacent to the south.

A post office called Beal was established in 1922, and remained in operation until 1932. William Beal, an early postmaster, gave the community his last name.
