= Joseph Beale =

Joseph Beale may refer to:

== People ==
- Joseph Boggs Beale (1841–1926), American artist
- Joseph Grant Beale (1839–1915), American law professor
- Joseph Henry Beale (1861–1943), member of U.S. House of Representatives

== Places ==
- Joseph Beale House, Washington, D.C.
