= Pustki, Masovian Voivodeship =

Pustki
- Village
- Location within Poland
- Coordinates: 52°09′11″N 22°22′28″E
- Country: Poland
- Voivodeship: Masovian
- County: Siedlce
- Gmina: Siedlce
- Population: 108

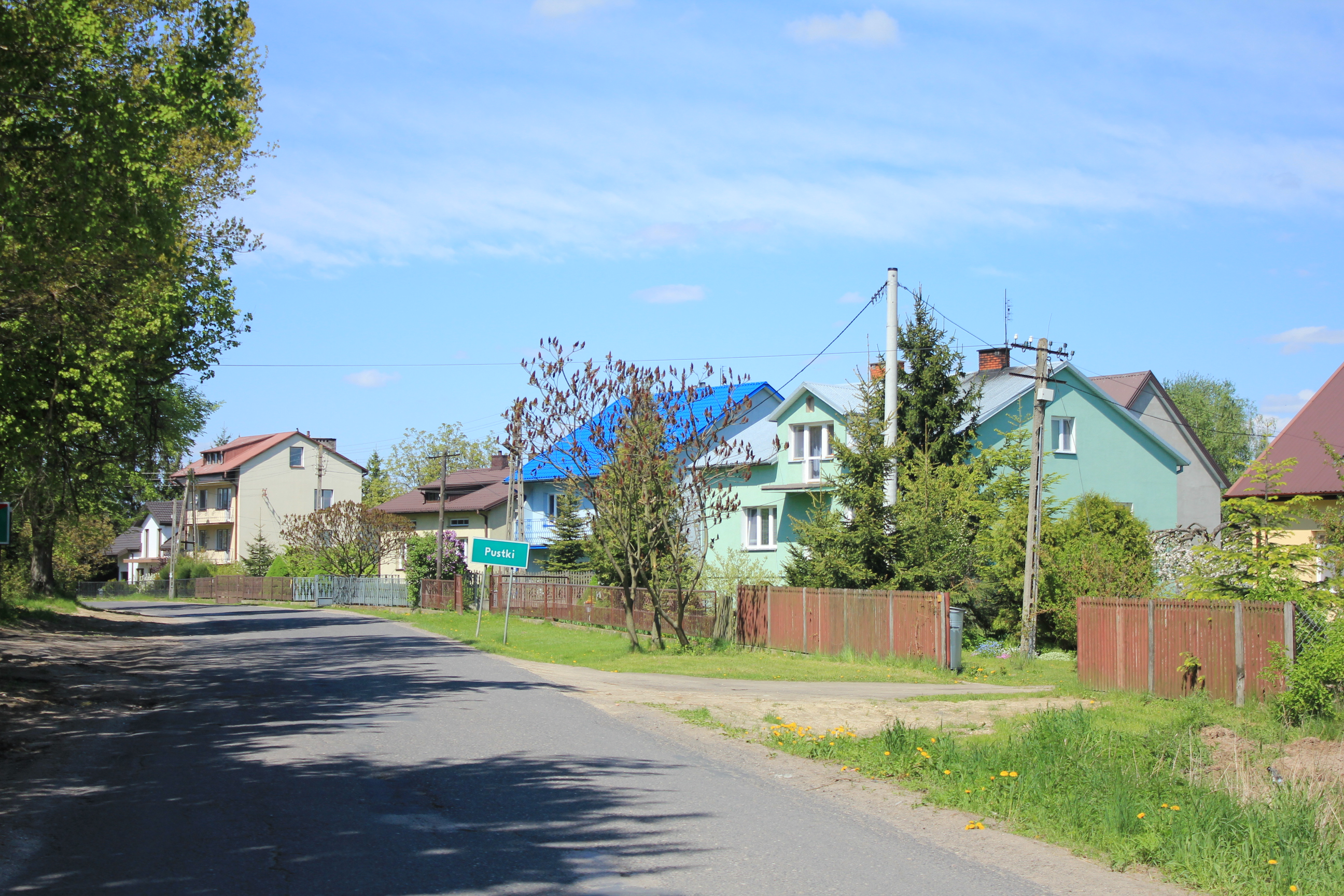

Pustki [ˈpustki] is a village in the administrative district of Gmina Siedlce, within Siedlce County, Masovian Voivodeship, in east-central Poland.
