= Bil Zelman =

American photographer and director (born 1972)

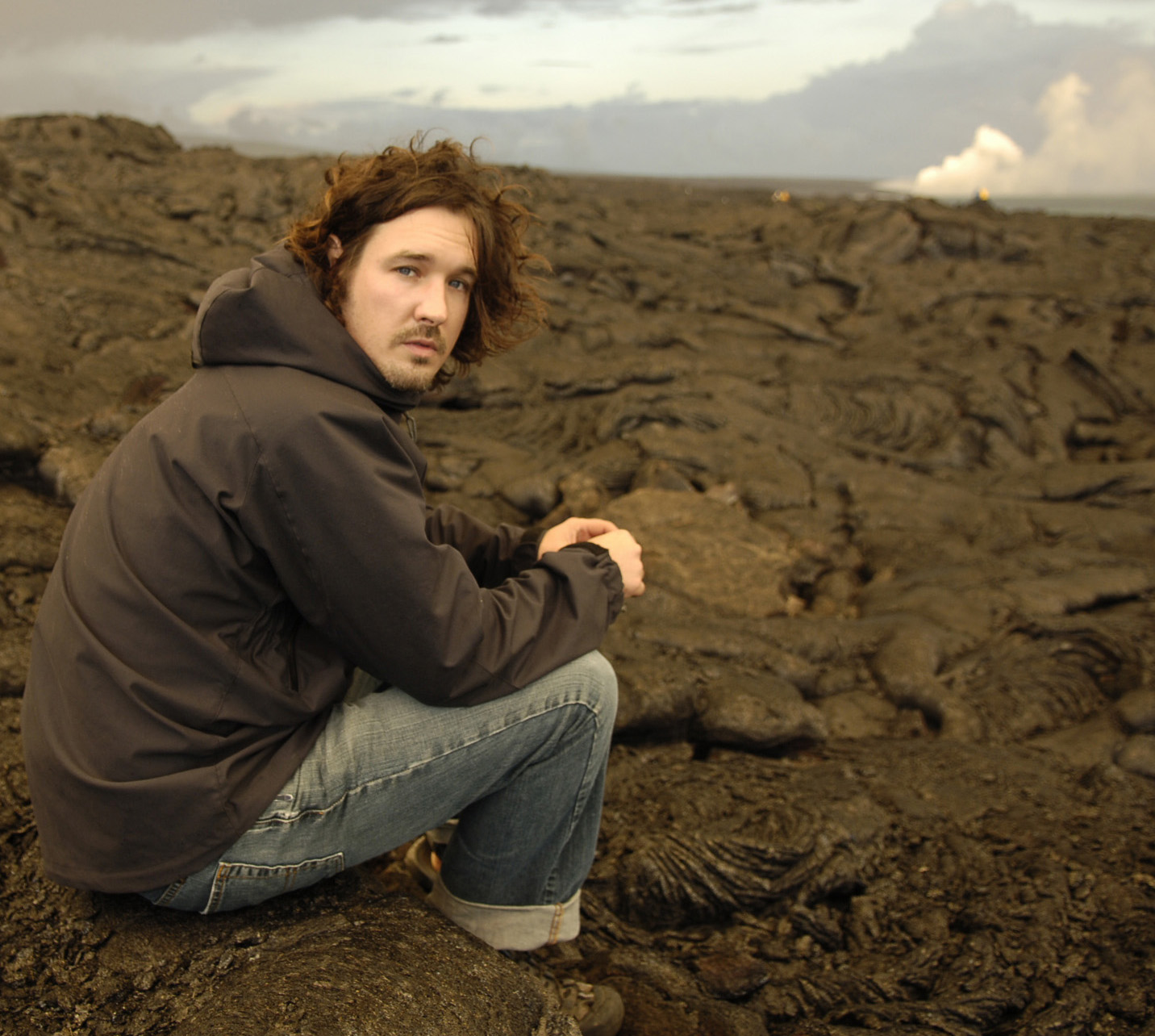
- Portrait of photographer Bil Zelman
- Born: Pittsburgh, Pennsylvania
- Occupations: Photographer, director
- Website: http://www.bilzelman.com

Bil C. Zelman is an American photographer and director known for his candid portraiture and spontaneous, photojournalistic style. Zelman developed a stylized form of hard-flash street photography while in art school and Los Angeles Times art critic Leah Ollman compares the "psychological density" of his work to Garry Winogrand, Larry Fink, Diane Arbus and William Klein, photographers that are "purposely getting it wrong in one way so as to get it right in another, disrupting visual order to ignite a kind of visceral disorder".

Zelman has photographed and directed campaigns for clients ranging from Apple to Coca-Cola to Levi's and is ranked in the top 3 most awarded photographers in the Americas by Lürzer's Archive.

In 2020 Daylight Books published And Here We Are- Stories From the Sixth Extinction, a collection of noir landscapes and writings about the current extinction crisis with a foreword by biologist E. O. Wilson. The book was awarded the Deeper Perspectives award by the International Center For Photography.

Zelman published Isolated Gesture in 2013, a collection of stylized black and white street photography. The book was chosen for an Art Directors Club award by Albert Watson,

Artweek portrays Isolated Gesture as "a cross between S. E. Hinton's The Outsiders and Dutch genre painting". Referencing Zelman's distinctive style, Los Angeles Times said that Zelman's guiding principle is having an intense proximity to his subject, "He doesn't shoot in a war zone but in the realm of ordinary life--on the street, at parties, in restaurants and stores. Working aggressively close to his subjects, and rapidly, intensifies whatever is in front of the camera".

== Selected exhibitions and permanent collections ==
- 2026 Museum of Contemporary Art, San Diego, Medium Photo Where We Stand
- 2026 Blue Sky, The Fourth Decade
- 2023 American Photography Winner
- 2022 And Here We Are, Interactive Installation, PhEST, Monopoli, Italy
- 2021 A Nature Story, Deeper Perspectives Award, International Center For Photography
- 2015 Isolated Gesture, Sparks Gallery, San Diego, California
- 2010 Dusk, Lucie Foundation, Los Angeles, California
- 2010 Museum of Photographic Arts, San Diego, California
- 2008 Portland Museum of Art, Portland, Oregon
- 2007 Isolated Gesture at Blue Sky Gallery, Portland, Oregon
- 2001 Street Work Nicole Dintamin Gallery, Los Angeles, California
