= Biel, Siedlce County =

Biel
- Village
- Location within Poland
- Coordinates: 52°9′27″N 22°23′51″E
- Country: Poland
- Voivodeship: Masovian
- County: Siedlce
- Gmina: Siedlce
- Population: 57

Biel [bjɛl] is a village in the administrative district of Gmina Siedlce, within Siedlce County, Masovian Voivodeship, in east-central Poland.
