= James Beal (cricketer) =

Australian cricketer

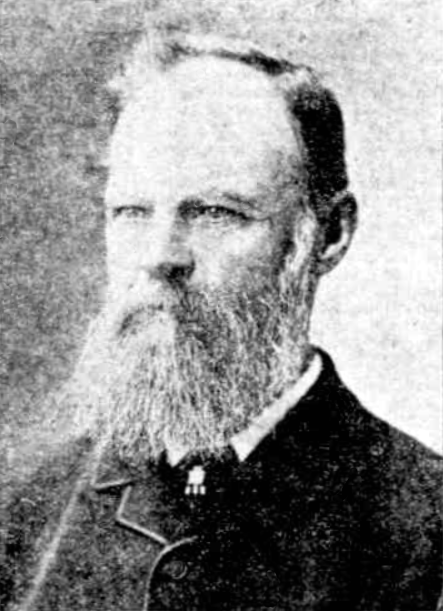

Personal information
- Born: 26 May 1830; Sydney, Australia
- Died: 24 August 1904 (aged 74); Milton, Queensland, Australia
- Source: ESPNcricinfo, 22 December 2016

James Charles Beal (26 May 1830 – 24 August 1904) was an Australian cricketer. He played one first-class match for New South Wales in 1856, which was the first Intercolonial cricket match between Victoria and New South Wales.

Beal was educated at St. James Grammar School in Sydney and then began working in the printing profession. In January 1862 he moved to Queensland settling in Brisbane where he worked as superintendent of the Government Printing Office until 1866 when he became Acting Government printer and in 1867 he was appointed Government printer and served in the role until retiring in 1893. He supported sports while in Queensland especially yachting, cricket, and football and he served as a member of the Queensland Turf Club committee for many years.

== See also ==
- List of New South Wales representative cricketers
