= Michael Beale =

Michael Beale may refer to:

- Michael Beale (football coach) (born 1980), English football manager
- Michael Beale (cricketer) (born 1947), English former cricketer
