= Keith Beal =

- Born: Keith Francis Arnold Beal; 22 December 1933 (age 92)
- Origin: Chalfont St. Peter, England

Keith Francis Arnold Beal (born 22 December 1933) is an English painter, sound engineer, recording engineer and producer, musician and composer, and author.

== Early years ==
Born on 22 December 1933 in Chalfont St. Peter, Buckinghamshire, Beal grew up in Potters Bar, Hertfordshire. After the Second World War, he was sent to Sweden in 1948 to gain strength, staying there for the better part of a year. His formative years were spent in NW London, where he went to school, and in Hamstead, where he explored his interest in painting, which had been instigated in childhood by his painter father.

== Painting ==
In 1955 Beal spent a year in Paris, aiming to develop his painting skills. On returning to England he found quick success, having an exhibition in a gallery in Bond Street and selling out on the day. Beal has remained actively interested in painting throughout his life. The Miguel de Cervantes novel Don Quixote has been a recurring inspiration for his paintings.

== Sound engineer ==
Beal worked as a sound engineer and technician for the BBC, as well as commercial television, and freelance in the film business from 1956 to 1973.

== University ==
Beal studied at the London School of Economics, gaining a BSc degree in economics in 1971. He also studied at Sussex University, gaining an MA in Music and the Sonic Arts in 2013

== Music ==
On his fortieth birthday in 1973, he acquired a saxophone, and won a bet that he could learn to play it within a year. In 1974, he co-founded Ogun Records, a record label specialising in jazz and modern classical music. Initially, he worked as a recording engineer and editor, but later became a producer, eventually leading the company as managing director. In his time at Ogun, Beal recorded and/or produced some 50 records by such artists as Trevor Watts, Chris McGregor's Brotherhood of Breath, Elton Dean, Harry Becket, John Surman and Keith Tippett. After leaving Ogun in 1980 Beal concentrated on playing the saxophone. He toured extensively with Trevor Watts Moiré Music, an avant garde jazz ensemble, playing at most of the European Jazz Festivals between 1982 and 1986.

Since 1987 Beal has divided his time between England and the Netherlands. Initially focusing on jazz, both as a performer and composer, he has increasingly moved towards modern classical composition. Early works include pieces for tuba quartet and saxophone quartet, but he became ever more confident and productive, writing 6 symphonies and 4 concertos, recording his Second Symphony in Kyiv with the Kyiv Modern Symphony Orchestra in 2001, and writing a clarinet concerto to be performed by Alan Hacker. He went on to compose two operas: Dulcinea was written on the 400th anniversary of the Miguel de Cervantes novel Don Quixote, on which the libretto is based, while Merlin has a libretto based on a compilation of myths around Le Morte d'Arthur characters Merlin and Nimue. He has also composed three ballets; the music of which has been played, but not yet danced.

== Novels ==
In 2011 and 2012, Beal published two strongly autobiographical novels, entitled Counterpoint in Three Parts: Reflexions on the Life and Loves of a Musician, based on the experiences of a touring musician, and Cadmium Red, based on painting and politics in Paris of the 1950s.

== Compositions ==
The following is an as yet incomplete overview of Beal's major compositions.

=== Symphonies ===
Title	First performance
Symphony No 1, Easter Day, 4 Movements	1998
Symphony No 2, 5 Movements	Kyiv, 1998
Symphony No 3, 4 Movements	1998
Symphony No 4, The Browns, 5 Movements	2000
Symphony No 5, 4 Movements	2000
Symphony No 6, 4 Movements	2002

=== Concertos ===
Title	First performance
Concerto for Cello	1995
Concerto for Piano, 1 Movement	Switzerland
Concerto for Clarinet, 3 Movements	Royal Leamington Spa 2001
Concerto for Viola, 4 Movements	2000

=== Operas and ballets ===
Title	First performance
3-minute opera (in Dutch Slang)	Utrecht, 2003
Opera No 1, Dulcinea, 4 Acts	2004
Opera No 2, Merlin, 3 Acts	2007
Cantata, "The Knighting of Sir Francis Drake"	2013
Tilburg|
Breda|
Ballet, Fantasy for Wind Orchestrafor Festival Hall	2000

=== Miscellaneous orchestral pieces ===
Title	First performance
Contemplations	
In the Mean Time	2002
Hitch	2002
Music for a Symphony Orchestra, Herbert	
Voor Eline	Commissioned 2001
Lory	
Chamber Orchestra, High Wickham	1994
Chamber Orchestra, Admiraal van Gent	1994
Dartington Piece, Errollynation	c2002
Piece for Saxophone Orchestra No 1, Hannibal Crossing the Alps	
Piece for Saxophone Orchestra No 2	
Suite for String Orchestra No 1, comprising:	1996–1999
– No 1	1998
– No 5	1998
– No 3	1998
– "Star of Eve"	1999
– "The Heart is Only a Muscle"	1996
– "Minimal Refinement"	1999
– "Mooie Neus"	1994
– "The Aftermath"	1998
– "Bril"	1998
– "The Chess Room"	1998
Suite for String Orchestra No 2, comprising:	1992–2002
– "George"	1992
– "Those That Never Were"	2002
– "Karin"	1999
Fugue for String Orchestra, "On Returning From Lisbon"	2008
Piece for 10 piece Brass Ensemble, Tell Brass, comprising:	Utrecht
– "So This Is How It Is"	
– "If Only"	
– "Encore"	
– "Fanfare for Nice Teachers"	1996
Piece for Catalyst Ensemble (13 Piece), The Day We Buried Michael Wilder	2004
Saxophone Quartet No 1	
Saxophone Quartet No 2	
Saxophone Quartet No 3	
Saxophone Quartet No 4	
Saxophone Quartet No 5	Utrecht and recorded
Saxophone Quartet No 6	
Saxophone Quartet No 7	
Saxophone Quartet No 8	
Saxophone Quartet No 9, comprising:	Breda – Commissioned Sax Quartet
– "Black Diamond"	2002
– "Topaz"	2002
– "Ruby"	2001
– "Amber"	2001
– "Amethyst"	1998
– "Emerald"	1998
– "Pearl"	1998
– "Sapphire"	1998
String Quartet No 1, 1 Movement, Living Dangerously	1991
String Quartet No 2 in F	1991
String Quartet No 3, On Returning from Kyiv	1995
String Quartet No 4, 4 Movements, with Bass Rotterdam (Amani)	1997
String Quartet No 5, 3 Movements Minsk	Kyiv and recorded 1998
String Quartet No 6, 3 Movements, Voor Natalia	1998
String Quartet No 7, 4 Movements, Voor Joost	Commissioned 2000
String Quartet No 8, 4 Movements,	2002
String Quartet No 9, Koh-i-Nor	
String Quartet No 10, 3 Movements, The Inner and the Outer	2013
String Quintet No 1 (with Bass), Investigations	2012
Tuba Quartet No 1, 3 Movements	Holland/Birmingham/Germany/
Tuba Quartet No 2, 3 Movements	
Oboe and String Quintet, 3 Movements	
Clarinet and String Quintet, 1st Movement "Loredana's Journey"	2009
Trumpet and String Quintet, 1st Movement "Loredana's Journey"	2009
Quintet for Cello and 4 Percussionists, 5 Movements	Amsterdam Bachzaal
Wind Sextet No 1, Last Summer	2008
Wind Sextet No 2, Daria	
Wind Quintet No 1	
Wind Quintet No 2, comprising:	
– "Investigations"	
– "A Minimal Effect"	
Brass Quintet No 1, For Michael, comprising:	Utrecht
– "The Eyes Have It"	
– "Nice Teachers"	
– "Come Kyiv Come Seattle"	
Brass Quintet No 2, Prevarications	
Suite for Flute and Harp No 1, comprising:	1992–1996
– "Flight of Fancy"	1992
– "A Waltz for the Collector of Dreams"	1996
– "Minimal Commitment"	1996
– "A Walk on the Beach"	1996
– "The Return"	1996
Suite for Flute and Harp No 2, comprising:	1992–1999
– "Primary Thoughts"	1992
– "The Nasty Man"	1992
– "Henk's Waltz"	1992
– "Tomorrow"	1999
Suite for Oboe and Accordion No 1, comprising:	1996
– "Flight of Fancy"	1996
– "A Waltz for the Collector of Dreams"	1996
– "Minimal Commitment"	1996
– "A Walk on the Beach"	1996
– "The Return"	1996
Suite for Oboe and Accordion No 2, comprising:	
– "Primary Thoughts"	
– "The Nasty Man"	
Henk's Waltz, comprising:	
– "Because"	1996
– "Alexia of Life"	1993
– "Mark? My Word"	1993
Choral Piece No 1, From West Hill, comprising Prelude and Fugue	Hastings/Holland x? and Radio
Choral Piece No 2, Dick Fricker's Poems, 3 Movements	2000
Songs:	2008–2013
– "Going to Dinner 1st Version"	2010
– "Merlin's First Aria"	2013
– "Nimue's First Aria"	2013
– "Nimue and Merlin's Duet"	2013
– "A Hymn to Kim"	2008
– "Je Bent"	2007
– "Kith and Kin"	
– "Morgan la Faye's First Aria"	2013
– "The Stormcock Song"	2009
Song Cycle for Soprano and Baritone, with Clarinet and Cello accompaniment, comprising:	2013
– Cello Solo, "A Letter of Intent"	
– Cello Solo, "Consequences"	
– Cello Solo, "Ed Hucation"	
– Baritone Song, "Going to Dinner 2nd Version"	
– Clarinet Solo, "The Red Man"	
– "Nimue and Merlin's Duet"	
– Baritone Song, "A Hymn to Kim"	
– Baritone Song, "Je Bent"	
– Baritone Song, "Merlin's First Aria"	
– Soprano Song, "Nimue's First Aria"	
Clarinet Quartet No 1, 4 Movements	1993
Clarinet Quartet No 2, Koh-i-Nor, 3 Movements	1992
Wood Wind Quartet – (FLMco)	1995
Tuba Quartet No 1, 3 Movements	Holland x? Birmingham/Germany
Tuba Quartet No 2, 3 Movements	
Double Reed Quartet, 3 Movements	
Flute Quartet, 3 Movements	
Clarinet Quintet, Kindred Spirit	1992
Clarinet, Cello and Piano Trio No 1, "Je Bent"	2007
Horn and Tuba Trio, "Call It Tuesday"	
Duet for Two Cellos, "Je Bent"	2007
Duet for Clarinet and Cello	
Horn and Piano Duet, "For Hatie"	
Suite for Trombone and Double Bass, No 1/No 2/No 3	
Suite for Basset Horn and Cello, comprising:	
– No 1 "Je Bent"	Commissioned 2007
– No 2	2008
– No 3 "Pavane for My Mother"	2008
Suite for Unaccompanied Clarinet, comprising:	
– Solo for E♭ Clarinet "Easily Mistaken"	2008
– Solo for Bass Clarinet "The Red Man"	2008
– Solo for Baset Horn "Basset on Experience"	2008
Suite for Unaccompanied Cello, comprising:	2013
– "Ed Hucation"	2013
– "A letter for the Cello Group"	2010
– "A Letter of Intent"	2010
– "Consequences"	2013
– "Basset on Experience"	2008
"Music for Sound Cooking Club", comprising:	
– "Convincent"	1991
– "Cooperation Riff"	
– "Easter Chick"	
– "Fan and Five"	
– "Hen Company"	
– "High Klaas"	
– "You Can't Ignor Igor"	
– "It's A Tjitze"	
– "Kindred Spirit"	
– "Kith & Kin"	
– "Living Dangerously"	
– "Lizard the Wizard"	1990
– "The Man at the Desk"	
– "My Goodness"	
– "Stars & Sriplings"	
