= Biehl =

Biehl is a German surname. Notable people with the surname include:

- Amy Biehl (1967–1993), American anti-apartheid activist murdered by a black South African mob
- Dorothea Biehl (1731–1788), Danish playwright and translator
- Janet Biehl (born 1953), writer associated with social ecology
- João Biehl, Brazilian anthropologist and theologian
- John Biehl (1939–2023), Chilean lawyer, political scientist and politician

== See also ==
- Biel (name), given name and surname
- Beal (surname)
