= William Beal (cricketer) =

Australian-born New Zealand cricketer

Personal information
- Full name: William Matthew Beal
- Born: 17 March 1877; Launceston, Tasmania, Australia
- Died: 3 August 1964 (aged 87); Dunedin, New Zealand
- Relatives: Carl Beal (brother)

Domestic team information
- Years: Team
- 1909/10: Otago

Umpiring information
- FC umpired: 5 (1923/24–1929/30)

Career statistics
Competition	First-class
Matches	1
Runs scored	1
Batting average	1.00
100s/50s	0/0
Top score	1*
Catches/stumpings	0/–
- Source: CricketArchive, 27 January 2021

William Matthew Beal (17 March 1877 – 3 August 1964) was a New Zealand cricketer who played for Otago. He was born in Launceston, Tasmania, Australia in 1877.

Beal made a single first-class appearance for the side in the 1909–10 Plunket Shield against Auckland. He scored a single run in the match.

Beal later stood as umpire in five first-class matches, including the second international match in 1927–28 between the touring Australian team and New Zealand at Carisbrook in Dunedin. His brother, Carl, played first-class cricket for Otago and Canterbury.

Beal died at Dunedin in 1964 aged 87.
