= Biel, Trebišov District =

Village and municipality in Slovakia

Biel Bély
- Municipality
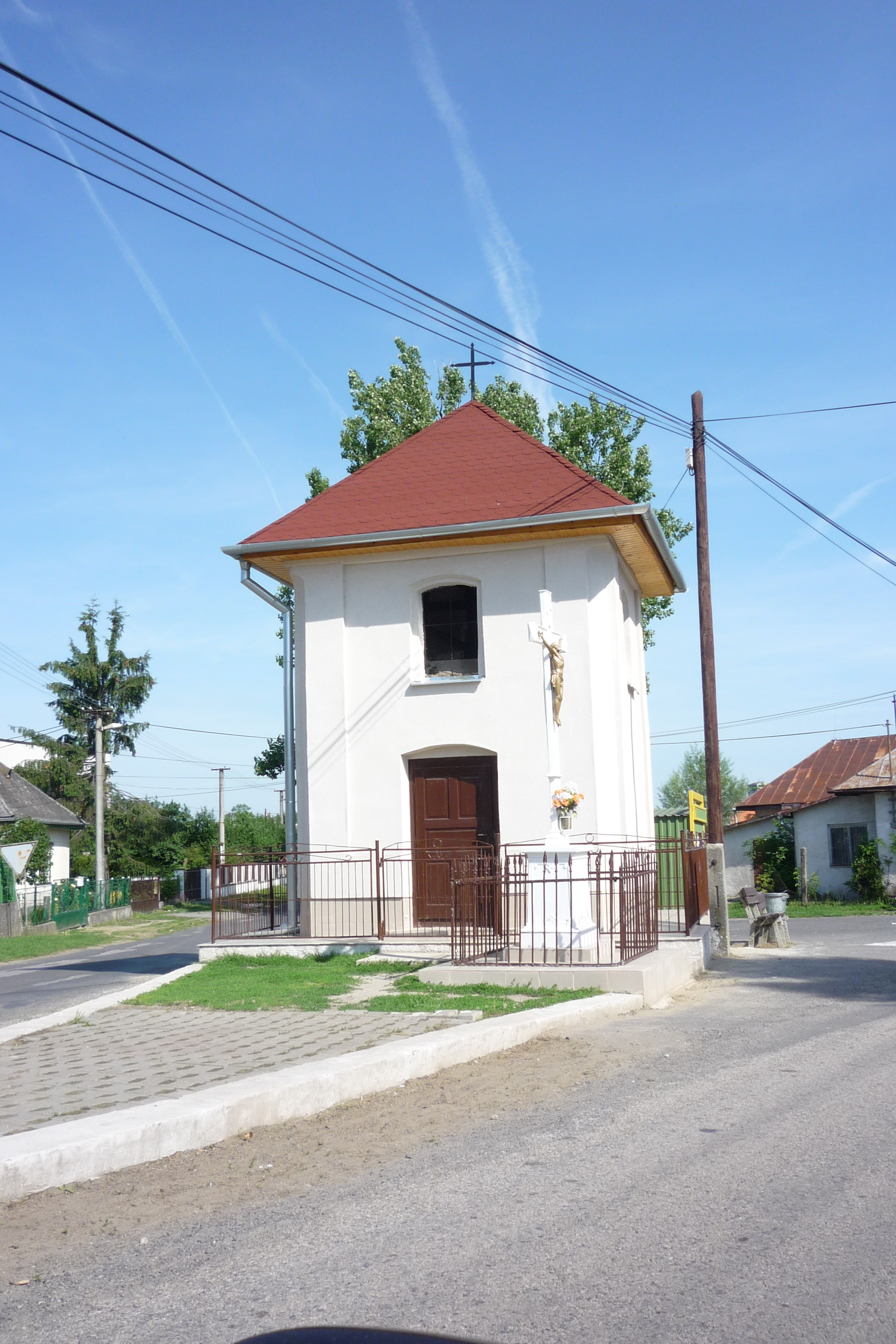

- Flag

- Location of Biel in the Košice Region Location of Biel in Slovakia
- Coordinates: 48.42°N 22.05°E
- Country: Slovakia
- Region: Košice Region
- District: Trebišov District
- First mentioned: 1214

Area
  - Total: 7.45 km^{2} (2.88 sq mi)
- Elevation: 101 m (331 ft)

Population (2025)
  - Total: 1,354
- Time zone: UTC+1 (CET)
  - Summer (DST): UTC+2 (CEST)
- Postal code: 764 1
- Area code: +421 56
- Vehicle registration plate (until 2022): TV
- Website: www.obecbiel.sk

Biel (Hungarian: Bély) is a village and municipality in the Trebišov District in the Košice Region of eastern Slovakia.

== Population ==
Population statistic (10 years)
Year	1995	2005	2015	2025
Count	1315	1432	1445	1354
Difference		+8.89%	+0.90%	−6.29%

Population statistic
Year	2024	2025
Count	1351	1354
Difference		+0.22%

It has a population of 1354 people (31 December 2025).

=== Ethnicity ===
Census 2021 (1+ %)
Ethnicity	Number	Fraction
Hungarian	985	72.85%
Slovak	404	29.88%
Not found out	51	3.77%
Romani	23	1.7%
Total	1352	

In year 2021 was 1352 people by ethnicity 985 as Hungarian, 404 as Slovak, 51 as Not found out, 23 as Romani, 6 as German, 3 as Czech, 2 as Ukrainian, 2 as Other, 1 as Rusyn and 1 as Russian.

Note on population: The difference values of population numbers in the table "Population statistic" and in the sections "Ethnicity" & "Religion" is caused by the use of various statistical methods.

=== Religion ===
Census 2021 (1+ %)
Religion	Number	Fraction
Roman Catholic Church	600	44.38%
Greek Catholic Church	259	19.16%
Calvinist Church	222	16.42%
None	152	11.24%
Not found out	80	5.92%
Jehovah's Witnesses	16	1.18%
Total	1352	

In year 2021 was 1352 people by religion 600 from Roman Catholic Church, 259 from Greek Catholic Church, 222 from Calvinist Church, 152 from None, 80 from Not found out, 16 from Jehovah's Witnesses, 10 from Evangelical Church, 5 from Eastern Orthodox Church, 4 from Islam, 2 from Other and not ascertained christian church, 1 from Old Catholic Church and 1 from United Methodist Church.

== See also ==
- List of municipalities and towns in Slovakia

== Genealogical resources ==
The records for genealogical research are available at the state archive "Statny Archiv in Kosice, Slovakia"

- Roman Catholic church records (births/marriages/deaths): 1848-1904 (parish B)
- Greek Catholic church records (births/marriages/deaths): 1795-1905 (parish B)
- Reformated church records (births/marriages/deaths): 1809-1929 (parish B)
