= Wołyńce, Masovian Voivodeship =

Wołyńce
- Village
- Location within Poland
- Coordinates: 52°7′N 22°13′E
- Country: Poland
- Voivodeship: Masovian
- County: Siedlce
- Gmina: Siedlce
- Population: 414

Wołyńce [vɔˈwɨɲt͡sɛ] is a village in the administrative district of Gmina Siedlce, within Siedlce County, Masovian Voivodeship, in east-central Poland.
