= Mary Beal =

American botanist and painter (1878–1964)

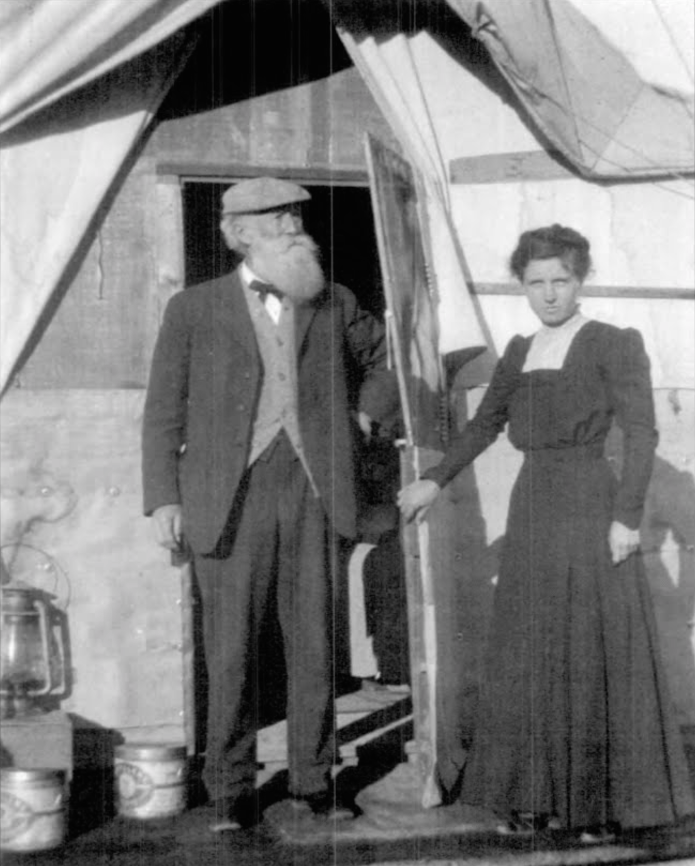
Mary Beal and John Burroughs, standing outside her tent home on the Dix Van Dyke ranch in 1911

Mary Beal (1878–1964) was a botanist who spent most of her life in Daggett, California, living at the ranch of local judge Dix Van Dyke. Though an amateur, she was praised by Willis Linn Jepson for her excellent botanical specimens, and many of these are stored permanently in the University and Jepson Herbaria.

She wrote a regular botany column for the Desert Magazine from 1939 to 1953. Back issues of this publication are available online today through Desert Magazine.

A trail at the Mojave National Preserve commemorates her life and contribution to Mojave Desert botany.

Some of her papers are held at the Mojave Desert Heritage and Cultural Association and some of her paintings of Mojave Desert flowers are held at the Mojave River Valley Museum in Barstow, California. Other papers and plant specimens are held at the archives of the University and Jepson Herbaria at the University of California, Berkeley.
