= Sara Sun Beale =

American law professor (born 1949)

- Born: 1949 (age 76–77); Toledo, Ohio, U.S.
- Occupations: Legal scholar; professor

Academic background
- Education: University of Michigan (BA); University of Michigan Law School (JD)

Sara Sun Beale (born 1949 in Toledo, Ohio) is an American legal scholar and professor who was Charles L. B. Lowndes Distinguished Professor of Law at Duke University School of Law. She retired from Duke in 2024 after a 45-year career there. Beale joined the university in 1979 as an associate professor, and was promoted to professor in 1984. She gained her endowed title in 2001. During her career at Duke, she has held visiting professorships to the University of Michigan Law School, New York University School of Law, and Georgetown University Law Center. Prior to her appointment at Duke Law, Beale graduated from the University of Michigan in 1971 with a Bachelor of Arts degree, and from the University of Michigan Law School in 1974 with a Juris Doctor. After graduating from law school, she became an associate at a Detroit-based law firm before she moved on to be a law clerk for Wade H. McCree of the Sixth Circuit in 1975. In 1976, she became an adviser in the Office of Legal Counsel, and in 1977 she became an assistant to the Solicitor General, which she held until her appointment at Duke. In 2013, Beale was noted in The New York Times as a leader for women in the field of white-collar law.

Beale's research focuses include criminal law and the role of the federal government in criminal law. She is also active in law reform efforts – since she was appointed in 2004, she has served as reporter for the Advisory Committee on Criminal Rules, a drafting body for the Federal Rules of Criminal Procedure. In 2016, Beale was among a group of Duke faculty and staff publicly calling for the repeal of House Bill 2.
