= Margaret Beale =

British artist (1886–1969)

- Born: 30 June 1886; Yaldham, Kent, England
- Died: 17 January 1969 (aged 82)
- Known for: Painting

Margaret L. C. Beale (née Crookshank 30 June 1886 – 17 January 1969) was a British artist, notable as a painter of seascapes and marine craft, who worked in both oils and watercolours.

== Biography ==
Beale was born at Yaldham in Kent and took art lessons in London from William Orpen between 1906 and 1908. In the following years she was a pupil of Percyval Tudor-Hart, first in Paris and then, during 1911 and 1912, in London. She gave up art lessons when she married Major Sydney Beale. Her father was Edgar Marsh Crookshank known for his work on vaccination.

During the First World War, Margaret Beale trained as a physiotherapist.

The Beales eventually settled at Chidham in Sussex where Margaret Beale had a studio overlooking the harbour and the sea and marine craft, especially yachts, became regular subjects of her paintings. She was a keen small-boat sailor and was present at the first meeting, in February 1939, of the Royal Society of Marine Artists and participated in the Society's inaugural exhibition. Beale was an active member of the Chichester Art Society and had a solo exhibition in the town. The National Maritime Museum in Greenwich holds examples of her work. Examples of her work can also be found at the Sunndal museum in Sunndal Norway where she painted several landscapes, interiors and people during holidays in her youth before her marriage.
