= Ulrich Biel =

German politician (1907–1996)

Ulrich Biel (17 May 1907 in Berlin-Charlottenburg – 6 January 1996 in Berlin) was a German politician and representative of the Christian Democratic Union.

After studying law and political science in 1934, he emigrated to the United States because of his Jewish origins. After the end of World War II, he returned to Berlin as an American officer but became a German citizen again.

== Political career ==
In 1946, Biel was "a captain in the U.S. Army and head of the political division of the staff of the then Colonel, Frank L. Howley, the U.S. commandant in Berlin." In 1967 he was running for Berlin assembly against Willy Brandt, who at the time was Foreign Minister and candidate for the Social Democratic Party of Germany. Both men had been refugees during the Nazi regime. They were after the vote of a working-class city district surrounded on two sides by the Berlin Wall. The election four years earlier saw the Christian Democratic Union of Germany poll just over 20%. In this election, Biel saw little to no point in facilitating discussions with the communist leaders of the East, instead, he saw progress coming through a four-power conference on the issue of Berlin. For eight years, 14 March 1971 to 23 April 1979, he was a member of the Berlin House of Representatives (including service as interim president in the 6th term).

Biel was honored for his achievements with the Ernst-Reuter-badge.

== Personal life ==
Ulrich was born to Richard Bielschowsky and Mathilde (née Simon) in Berlin. His mother, Mathilde ("Lilly"), was murdered during the Holocaust in the Riga Ghetto. She was in the same deportation on 5 September 1942 as International Jewish Sports Hall of Fame athlete Lilli Henoch. On 8 September 1943, both women were murdered at gunpoint by the Einsatzgruppen.

In her book, The Power of Solitude: My Life in the German Resistance, Marion Yorck von Wartenburg recounted that she met Biel at the end of 1946 when he joined his friend, Paulus van Husen, in visiting her house. They became friends and later romantic partners living together for some 50 years. Biel encouraged Marion to return to her dream of becoming a lawyer. She succeeded and later became a judge. She reflected on how Biel has impacted her stating, "Through him I have gained a lively relationship to politics and to public life in general."

== See also ==
- List of German Christian Democratic Union politicians
