= Beal (surname) =

Beal is a surname. Notable people with the surname include:

- Andrew Beal (born 1952), American billionaire
- Arthur Harold Beal (1896–1992), creator of Nitt Witt Ridge
- Bradley Beal (born 1993), American basketball player
- Brandon Beal (born 1983), American singer, songwriter, & producer
- Brea Beal (born 2000), American basketball player
- Dana Beal (born 1947), American social and political activist
- Ernest Frederick Beal (1885–1918), English war hero, recipient of the Victoria Cross
- Foster Ellenborough Lascelles Beal (1840–1916), American ornithologist
- Harry Beal (1930–2021), American Navy SEAL
- Jack Beal (1931–2013), English painter
- James Hartley Beal (1861–1945), Ohio educator, legislator, author, and pharmacist
- Jeff Beal (born 1963), American composer
- Jeremy Beal (born 1987), American football player
- John Beal (actor) (1909–97), American actor
- John Beal (composer) (born 1947), American composer
- Keith Beal (born 1933), English painter, musician, composer and author
- Lorna Beal (1923–2020), Australian cricketer
- Mary Beal (1878–1964), American botanist and painter
- Nick Beal (born 1970), British rugby union player
- Phil Beal (born 1945), English footballer
- Robert Beal Jr. (born 1999), American football player
- Sam Beal (born 1996), American football player
- Samuel Beal (1825–1889), English Oriental scholar
- Scott Beal (1890–1973), American actor
- William James Beal (1833–1924), American botanist

== See also ==
- Beale, surname
- Biehl, surname
