= Beel (disambiguation) =

Beel is a term for a pond (wetland) with static water.

Beel may also refer to:

- Chalan Beel - a wetland in Bangladesh
- Louis Beel (1902–1977), Prime Minister of the Netherlands (1946-1948, 1958–1959)

== See also ==
- Beal (disambiguation)
- Bheel (disambiguation)
- BIL (disambiguation)
