= Lionel Smith Beale =

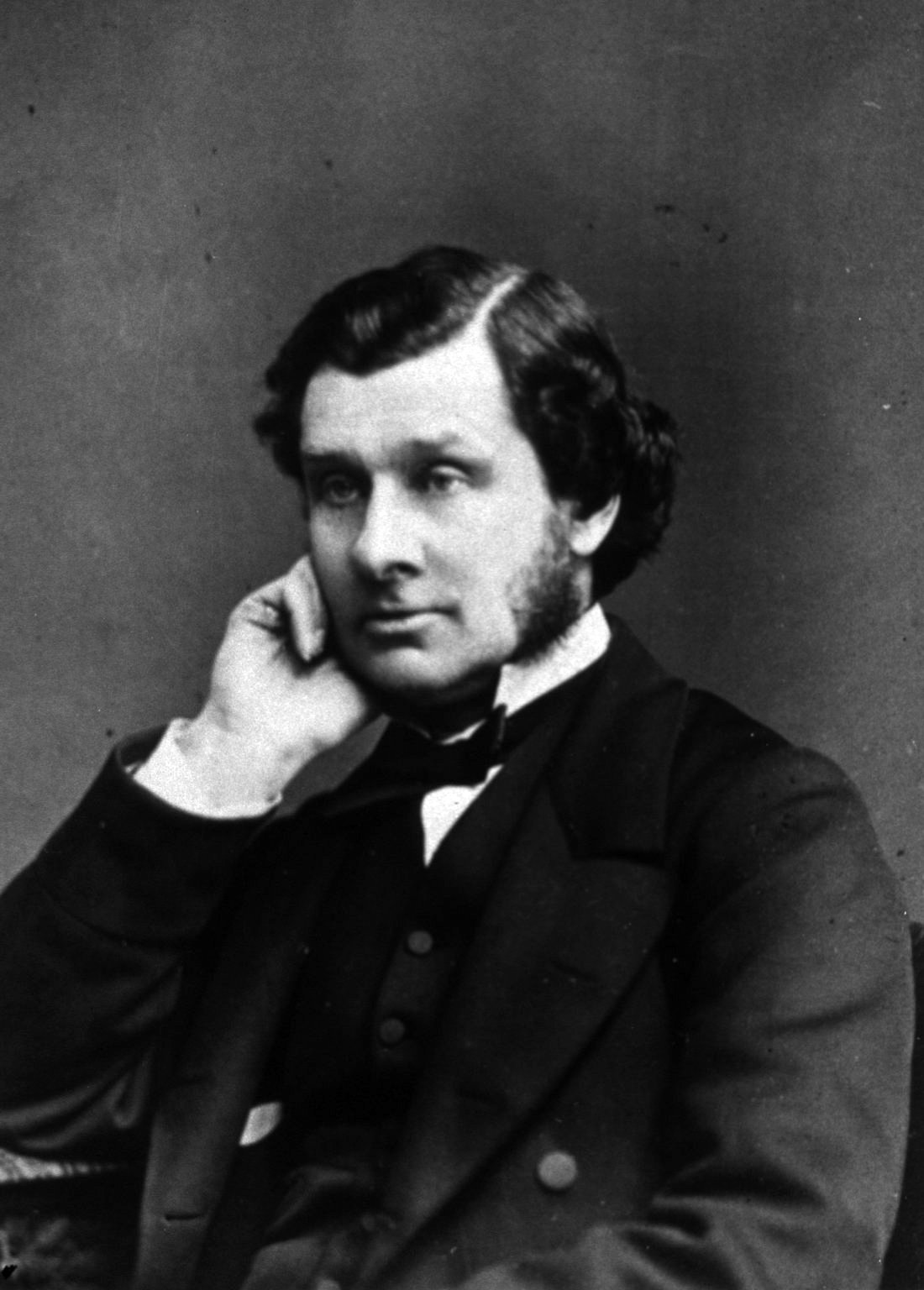
- Born: 5 February 1828
- Died: 28 March 1906 (aged 78)
- Occupation: Physician
- Known for: Microscopy

Lionel Smith Beale (5 February 1828 – 28 March 1906) was a British physician, microscopist, and professor at King's College London. He graduated in medicine from King's College in 1851. He was elected a Fellow of the Royal Society in 1857.

== Life ==
Lionel Smith Beale was born in London on 5 February 1828, son of Lionel John Beale, a member of the Royal College of Surgeons. He attended King's College School and King's College London, where he obtained a degree in medicine. He also studied zoology at King's College.

A year after graduating, Beale used his own funds to set up a laboratory for chemical and microscopic research and teaching. In 1853, when he was 25, King's College appointed him Professor of Physiology and General and Morbid Anatomy. In 1857 Beale was the founding editor of Archives of Medicine. He promised the readers of this journal that it would be "freely illustrated" since "drawings are really of much more use than long descriptions".

Beale was physician to King's College Hospital for forty years. At King's College, he became Professor of Pathology and then Professor of the Principle and Practice of Medicine until 1896, when he resigned. Beale was awarded the Baly medal in 1871. He was Croonian Lecturer to the Royal Society, 1865, President of the Quekett Microscopical Club, 1870–1871, Lumleian Lecturer at the Royal College of Physicians, 1875, President of the Royal Microscopical Society, 1879, and Government medical referee for England, 1891–1904.

Beale married Frances, daughter of Dr. Blakiston, F.R.S. His son, Peyton T. B. Beale, also became a surgeon. He died on 28 March 1906 at the age of 78.

== Work ==
In writing, teaching and public speaking, Beale was a leading proponent of the scientific method in medicine. He was a strong advocate of the value of microscopy, which he felt to be essential to understanding morbid growths and diseases. In his 1854 book The Microscope in its Applications to Practical Medicine, Beale described the cell as a perfectly closed sac containing a nucleus, which in turn usually contained a clear bright spot, the nucleolus. He classified cells by shape as well as by the part of the body they came from, and discussed ways in which cancerous cells could be distinguished from benign changes with similar clinical appearance. In 1860 he found and described cancer cells in sputum.

Beale pioneered differential staining. From observing the differences in the way in which active, living organisms responded to staining compared with nonliving organisms, he concluded that the nucleus must hold the "bioplasm", or the essence of life. He was a passionate and vocal advocate of the view that there is an essential difference between living and inert matter. He felt that there were reasons to doubt the evidence for human evolution. Beale has been described as a "staunch vitalist". He believed in a "vital force", saying,

The living world is absolutely distinct from the non-living world, and instead of being a necessary outcome of it, is, compared with the antiquity of matter, probably a very recent addition to it—not, of course, an addition of mere transformed or modified matter and energy, but of transcendent power conferred on matter, by which both matter and its forces are controlled, regulated and arranged, according, it may be, to laws, but not the laws of inert matter.

He said,

There is a mystery in life—a mystery which has never been fathomed, and which appears greater, the more deeply the phenomena of life are studied and contemplated. In living centres—far more central than the centres seen by the highest magnifying powers, in centres of living matter, where the eye cannot penetrate, but towards which the understanding may tend—proceed changes of the nature of which the most advanced physicists and chemists fail to afford us the conception: nor is there the slightest reason to think that the nature of these changes will ever be ascertained by physical investigation, inasmuch as they are certainly of an order or nature totally distinct from that to which any other phenomenon known to us can be regulated.

== Publications ==
- The Microscope, and Its Application to Clinical Medicine (1854)
- How to Work with the Microscope (5th ed., 1880, 1st pub. 1857)
- Illustrations to How to Work with the Microscope (1859)
- On the Scientific Investigation of Disease in Animals and Man (1865)
- The Microscope in its Application to Practical Medicine (1867)
- Protoplasm: Or, Life, Force, and Matter (1870)
- Disease Germs: Their Real Nature (1870)
- The Mystery of Life (1871)
- Life Theories: Their Influence Upon Religious Thought (1871)
- Bioplasm: An Introduction to the Study of Physiology & Medicine (1872)
- The Microscope in Medicine (1878)
- On Slight Ailments (1882)
- Urinary and Renal Derangements and Calculous Disorders (1885)
- Our Morality and the Moral Question (1893)
- The New Materialism: Dictatorial Scientific Utterances and the Decline of Thought (1899)

== Notes and references ==
Citations

Sources

- Anderson, Nancy; Dietrich, Michael R. (10 January 2012). The Educated Eye: Visual Culture and Pedagogy in the Life Sciences. UPNE. p. 48. ISBN 978-1-61168-044-7.
- Koss, Leopold G.; Melamed, Myron R. (2006). Koss' Diagnostic Cytology And Its Histopathologic Bases. Lippincott Williams & Wilkins. p. 7. ISBN 978-0-7817-1928-5.
- "Lionel Smith Beale (1828–1906) Obituary". The Times (37980). 29 March 1906.
- Numbers, Ronald L. (2006). The Creationists: From Scientific Creationism to Intelligent Design. Harvard University Press. p. 66. ISBN 978-0-674-02339-0.
- Shipman, Paul R. (October 1883). "Matter living and not-living". Popular Science. Bonnier Corporation. ISSN 0161-7370.
- Wayne, Randy O. (15 September 2009). Plant Cell Biology: From Astronomy to Zoology. Academic Press. ISBN 978-0-08-092127-3.
