= National Register of Historic Places listings in Mason County, West Virginia =

Location of Mason County in West Virginia

This is a list of the National Register of Historic Places listings in Mason County, West Virginia.

This is intended to be a complete list of the properties and districts on the National Register of Historic Places in Mason County, West Virginia, United States. The locations of National Register properties and districts for which the latitude and longitude coordinates are included below, may be seen in an online map.

There are 13 properties and districts listed on the National Register in the county.

This National Park Service list is complete through NPS recent listings posted January 2, 2026.

Contents: Counties in West Virginia

Barbour - Berkeley - Boone - Braxton - Brooke - Cabell - Calhoun - Clay - Doddridge - Fayette - Gilmer - Grant - Greenbrier - Hampshire - Hancock - Hardy - Harrison - Jackson - Jefferson - Kanawha - Lewis - Lincoln - Logan - Marion - Marshall - Mason - McDowell - Mercer - Mineral - Mingo - Monongalia - Monroe - Morgan - Nicholas - Ohio - Pendleton - Pleasants - Pocahontas - Preston - Putnam - Raleigh - Randolph - Ritchie - Roane - Summers - Taylor - Tucker - Tyler - Upshur - Wayne - Webster - Wetzel - Wirt - Wood - Wyoming

== Current listings ==
	Name on the Register	Image	Date listed	Location	City or town	Description
1	Couch-Artrip House	Couch-Artrip House	August 23, 1984 (#84003623)	U.S. Route 35; 38°42′11″N 81°58′04″W	Southside	
2	Eastham House		February 24, 1989 (#88002669)	U.S. Route 35; 38°47′27″N 82°03′53″W	Point Pleasant	
3	Elm Grove		July 16, 1992 (#92000897)	2283 U.S. Route 35 N. 38°43′19″N 81°57′18″W	Southside	
4	The Gold Houses	The Gold Houses	July 9, 1997 (#97000784)	503 and 505 N. 2nd St. 39°01′29″N 82°01′28″W	Mason	
5	Lewis-Capehart-Roseberry House	Lewis-Capehart-Roseberry House	August 29, 1979 (#79002590)	1 Roseberry Lane; 38°52′36″N 82°08′05″W	Point Pleasant	
6	Maplewood		February 16, 2001 (#00000251)	1951 U.S. Route 35; 38°40′40″N 81°57′59″W	Pliny	
7	Gen. John McCausland House	Gen. John McCausland House	June 16, 1980 (#00000778)	U.S. Route 35; also Grape Hill; 38°39′26″N 81°58′14″W	Leon	Grape Hill represents a boundary increase of July 5, 2000
8	Point Pleasant Battleground	Point Pleasant Battleground	January 26, 1970 (#70000656)	Southwestern corner of Main and 1st Sts. 38°50′21″N 82°08′26″W	Point Pleasant	
9	Point Pleasant Historic District	Point Pleasant Historic District	July 1, 1985 (#85001465)	Main St. between 1st and 11th and Viand St. between 8th and 10th 38°50′40″N 82°08′18″W	Point Pleasant	
10	Powell-Redmond House	Powell-Redmond House	February 10, 1983 (#83003243)	23 Columbia St. 39°00′05″N 82°02′23″W	Clifton	
11	Shumaker-Lewis House	Shumaker-Lewis House	March 26, 1979 (#79002589)	Brown St. 39°01′09″N 82°01′53″W	Mason	
12	Smithland Farm		October 17, 2003 (#03001061)	U.S. Route 35 between Lower Nine Mile Rd. and Lower Five Mile Rd. 38°46′42″N 82°03′02″W	Henderson	
13	Wilson Mail Pouch Barn		January 8, 2026 (#100012516)	12621 Charleston Road; 38°47′10″N 82°00′50″W	Leon vicinity	

== See also ==
- List of National Historic Landmarks in West Virginia
- National Register of Historic Places listings in West Virginia
