= Chester H. West =

- Born: January 3, 1888; Fort Collins, Colorado
- Died: May 20, 1935 (aged 47); Gallipolis, Ohio
- Burial place: Van Sickle Cemetery, Southside, West Virginia
- Military career
- Allegiance: United States of America
- Branch: United States Army
- Rank: First Sergeant
- Service number: 2263711
- Units: Company D, 363d Infantry, 91st Division
- Conflicts: World War I
- Awards: Medal of Honor

Chester Howard West (January 3, 1888 – May 20, 1935) was a soldier in the United States Army who received the Medal of Honor for his actions during World War I.

== Biography ==
West was born in Fort Collins, Colorado on January 3, 1888, and later enlisted for World War I in California.

After the war, he married Maggie Elizabeth Van Sickle of Southside on Christmas Day, 1932, and began working as a farm hand for Sam McCausland, the son of Civil War Confederate Gen. John McCausland.

West died May 20, 1935, shot and murdered by Sam McCausland at West's home during an altercation. West later died at a hospital in Gallipolis, Ohio, and McCausland was convicted of second-degree murder.

West is buried at the Van Sickle Cemetery in Southside, West Virginia, but his grave-site was lost as the cemetery became part of the Chief Cornstalk Wildlife Management Area in the 1970s.

The first attempt to rediscover West's grave was 2012 by Jack Crutchfield of West Virginia Public Television's "Obscurely Famous" series, however Crutchfield was unsuccessful. In 2015, the grave was successfully rediscovered by Derrick Jackson, a Boy Scout who used the rediscovery of the grave as his Eagle Scout service project. West was reinterred at the Donel C. Kinnard Memorial State Veterans Cemetery in Dunbar, West Virginia, on May 12, 2018, at 2:00 pm with full Military Honors with escort and Honor Guard provided by the West Virginia Patriot Guard Rides

== Medal of Honor citation ==
Rank and organization: First Sergeant, U.S. Army, Company D, 363d Infantry, 91st Division. Place and date: Near Bois-de-Cheppy, France, September 26, 1918. Entered service at: Los Banos, Calif. Birth: Fort Collins, Colo. G.O. No.: 34, W.D., 1919.
Citation:

While making his way through a thick fog with his automatic rifle section, his advance was halted by direct and unusual machinegun fire from 2 guns. Without aid, he at once dashed through the fire and, attacking the nest, killed 2 of the gunners, 1 of whom was an officer. This prompt and decisive hand-to-hand encounter on his part enabled his company to advance farther without the loss of a man.

== See also ==
- List of Medal of Honor recipients
- List of Medal of Honor recipients for World War I
