= Point Pleasant =

Point Pleasant may refer to:

== Places ==
=== Canada ===
- Point Pleasant Park, Halifax, Nova Scotia

=== England ===
- Point Pleasant (Wallsend), Tyne and Wear

=== United States ===
- Point Pleasant Township, Warren County, Illinois
- Point Pleasant, Indiana
- Point Pleasant, New Jersey
- Point Pleasant Beach, New Jersey
- Point Pleasant, Maryland, a neighborhood of Glen Burnie, Maryland
- Point Pleasant, Missouri, in New Madrid County, Missouri
- Point Pleasant, Ohio
- Point Pleasant, Pennsylvania
- Point Pleasant, West Virginia

== Other ==
- Point Pleasant (TV series), a 2005 Fox television show set in a fictionalized version of the New Jersey town
- Battle of Point Pleasant, near Point Pleasant, West Virginia; site of a 1774 battle between Virginia militia and Native Americans
- "Point Pleasant", a song by God Is an Astronaut from the 2002 album The End of the Beginning

== See also ==
- Point Pleasant Historic District (disambiguation)
- Pleasant Point (disambiguation)
- Point Pleasant High School (disambiguation)
