= West Virginia Ordnance Works =

US Army ammunition manufacturing facility

Coordinates: 38.925635°N 82.072087°W

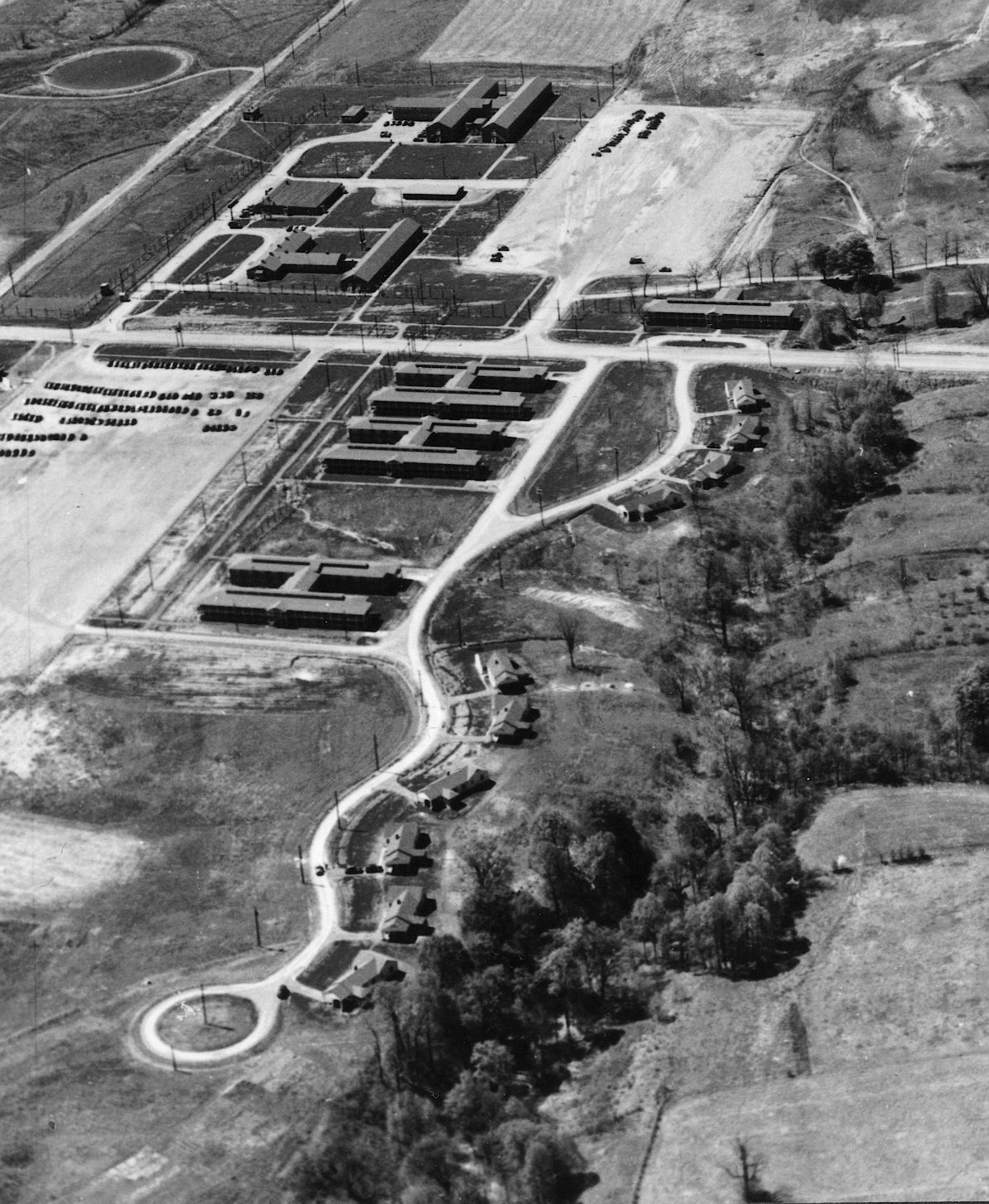
Aerial of Staffhouse Row and Dormitories

West Virginia Ordnance Works (WVOW) was a United States Army ammunition manufacturing facility constructed and operated during World War II. It was located north of Point Pleasant, in Mason County, West Virginia, encompassing 8,323 acres (33.68 km^{2}). The $45 million plant employed 3500 at its peak and operated from 1942 to 1945. The site was disposed of following the war and land was utilized by creating a landfill, the McClintic Wildlife Management Area, the Mason County Airport and an industrial park, among others.

It was also around here that the first claimed sighting of the cryptid dubbed "Mothman" occurred in November, 1966.

== Superfund ==
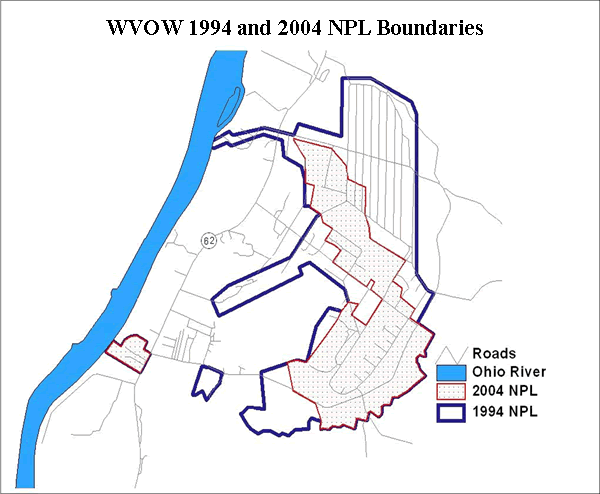
NPL boundaries

Around 1979, fishermen in the Wildlife Management Area reported red water seepage at the site and beginning in 1981, TNT, DNT and other residual contaminants from World War II operations were discovered. On September 8, 1983, the site was listed on the National Priorities List (NPL) making it eligible for cleanup as part of the Superfund program. The site was West Virginia's "top priority" cleanup site and was among the national top ten most polluted sites. Portions of the site have been cleaned up or determined uncontaminated and were later removed from the list, but cleanup has not been completed as of 2007.

According to the FY 2006 Defense Environmental Restoration Program Annual Report To Congress, 2,704 acres (10.94 km^{2}) remained on the NPL and $71.4 million in cleanup funding had been appropriated. Estimated completion was FY 2020 for an additional $27.9 million.

According to the FY 2019 Defense Environmental Restoration Program Annual Report to Congress, $1.9 million in FY 2019 funds were obligated to the site. The total cost estimate in FY 2019 was $72 million.

== See also ==
- Mothman (alleged sightings in the vicinity known as the "TNT area")
- McClintic Wildlife Management Area received around 2,788 acres (11.28 km^{2}), the industrial portion of the site
- Mason County Airport (FAA location identifier: 3I2)
