= Point Pleasant Historic District =

Point Pleasant Historic District may refer to:

- Point Pleasant Historic District (Point Pleasant, Pennsylvania), listed on the National Register of Historic Places in Bucks County, Pennsylvania
- Point Pleasant Historic District (Point Pleasant, West Virginia), listed on the National Register of Historic Places in Mason County, West Virginia

== See also ==
- Point Pleasant (disambiguation)
