= John McCausland =

Confederate general during the American Civil War (1836–1927)

John McCausland Jr.
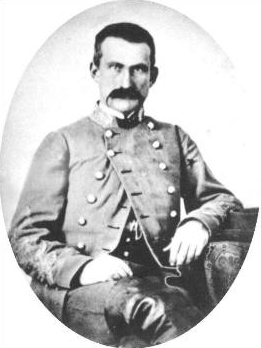
- Born: John McCausland Jr. September 13, 1836; St. Louis, Missouri, U.S.
- Died: January 22, 1927 (aged 90); Point Pleasant, West Virginia, U.S.
- Burial place: Henderson, West Virginia, U.S.
- Military career
- Allegiance: Confederate States of America
- Branch: Confederate States Army
- Service years: 1861–1865
- Rank: Brigadier general
- Commands: 36th Virginia Infantry
- Conflicts: American Civil War: Battle of Fort Donelson; Battle of Charleston (1862); Valley Campaigns of 1864; Siege of Petersburg; Battle of Five Forks; Appomattox Campaign

Signature
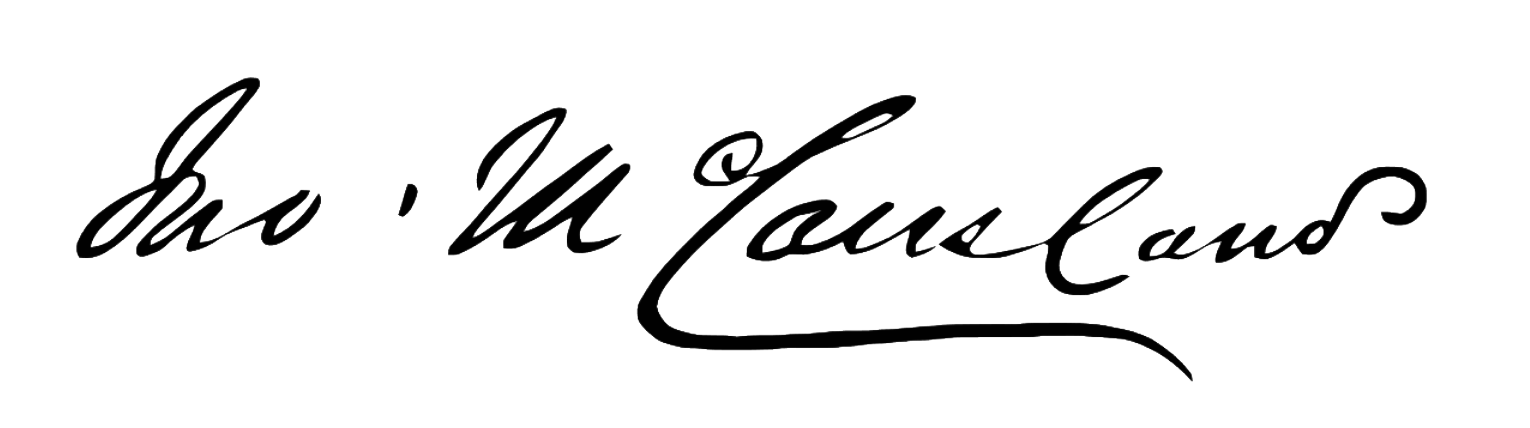

John McCausland Jr. (September 13, 1836 – January 22, 1927) was a Confederate States Army brigadier general during the American Civil War. He commanded the 36th Virginia Infantry and served in several campaigns in western and eastern Virginia, including the Battle of Fort Donelson, the Siege of Petersburg, and the Appomattox Campaign.

McCausland is particularly associated with the burning of Chambersburg, Pennsylvania, in July 1864. During Jubal Early's campaign in Maryland and Pennsylvania, McCausland demanded a ransom from Hagerstown, Maryland, and later ordered the burning of Chambersburg after the town failed to provide the demanded payment.

== Early life and education ==
McCausland was born in St. Louis, Missouri on September 13, 1836, the son of an immigrant from Ireland. Orphaned in 1843, he lived first with his grandmother until her death, then he and his brother went to live with his aunt Jane Smith near Point Pleasant, Virginia, now in Mason County, West Virginia. McCausland attended the Buffalo Academy in Putnam County, Then he traveled to Harrisonburg, Virginia, studied engineering at the Virginia Military Institute (VMI) and graduated with first honors in the class of 1857. In 1858, after a year of further studies at the University of Virginia in Charlottesville, Virginia, McCausland became an assistant professor of mathematics at VMI until 1861. In 1859 he and VMI professor Stonewall Jackson commanded a group of VMI cadets at the execution of John Brown at Charles Town for the uprising at Harpers Ferry.

== Career ==
=== American Civil War ===
Immediately after Virginia seceded, McCausland recruited an artillery company from Rockbridge County (the 1st Rockbridge Artillery) but refused a command, instead recruiting in the Kanawha Valley at General Robert E. Lee's request. On July 16, 1861, McCausland was commissioned as a colonel and placed in command of the 36th Virginia Infantry Regiment. The regiment had been formed from the 2nd Kanawha Regiment and part of the 3rd Kanawha Regiment, which had been recruited heavily from the south-western counties of what became West Virginia during the war. McCausland's regiment fought in the brigade of Brigadier General John B. Floyd in western Virginia and was transferred to Bowling Green, Kentucky, to serve in General Albert Sidney Johnston's army. McCausland and his men fought at the Battle of Fort Donelson and escaped before the Confederates surrendered the fort in February 1862. For the remainder of 1862 and 1863, McCausland's troops fought in the Department of Southwest Virginia. There, McCausland gained the nickname "Tiger John" for his fearless partisan raids.

After Confederate Brigadier General Albert Gallatin Jenkins was mortally wounded during the Union Army victory at the Battle of Cloyd's Mountain on May 9, 1864, McCausland took command of the Confederate forces in western Virginia (including the new state of West Virginia). McCausland was promoted to brigadier general on May 18, 1864; Soon citizens credited him with saving Lynchburg from a raid by Union Army Major General David Hunter, who had invaded the Shenandoah Valley and burned the Virginia Military Institute as well as the house of former Virginia governor John Letcher. McCausland sent units to harass the Union supply trains, as well as burned bridges and fired upon the crews sent to rebuild them, buying time for Generals Grumble Jones and John Imboden to join forces at Staunton (although Jones would die at the Battle of Piedmont on June 5) and then reinforce Lynchburg, where a train ruse about other reinforcements led Hunter to turn back.

McCausland fought as a cavalry brigade commander during the Valley Campaigns of 1864, under Lieutenant General Jubal A. Early, using his 2,800 men in various configurations to raid into Maryland (often extorting large sums of money from towns by threatening to burn them) and Pennsylvania. Under Early's orders, on July 30, 1864, McCausland burned the town of Chambersburg, Pennsylvania, after it failed to pay a $100,000 extortion demand, justifying it as retaliation for the private property destroyed during Hunter's Shenandoah Valley campaign. In fact, Early's orders left little room for compromise or negotiation, and bankers had removed most of the money from Chambersburg days earlier. Plus despite Union General Darius Couch's early morning telegrams about the oncoming raiders, General William Averell's cavalry did not arrive from nearby Greencastle until after 2p.m., only to find still-burning ruins, displaced civilians and a trail of miscellaneous merchandise looted, then dropped by McCausland's departing raiders. The Union army relentlessly pursued McCausland's cavalry, ambushing and routing them at the Battle of Moorefield on August 8.

After Early's campaign failed, McCausland rejoined the Army of Northern Virginia in the Siege of Petersburg, the Battle of Five Forks, and the Appomattox Campaign. As at Fort Donelson, McCausland refused to surrender but escaped with his cavalry from Appomattox Court House before Robert E. Lee's surrender, but withdrew to Lynchburg and disbanded his unit soon after. He was paroled in Charleston, West Virginia, on May 22, 1865.

== Later life ==
After the war, McCausland spent two years in Europe and Mexico before returning to the United States. In Mexico he was in Maximilian's military service. He faced arson charges for the burning of Chambersburg, but was pardoned by President Ulysses S. Grant. With part of his inheritance from his father, he purchased a tract of 6,000 acres (24 km²) 17 miles from Point Pleasant in Mason County, West Virginia. He also married Emmett Charlotte Hannah on October 3, 1878, and they would have four children: 3 sons and a daughter. During the next six decades, McCausland became known as a progressive farmer, draining his land using tiles from a relative's factory, and increasing his acreage. In his final years, he lived with his daughter Charlotte, his sons operating farms nearby.

== Death and legacy ==
McCausland died at his farm, "Grape Hill", in Pliny, near Point Pleasant, West Virginia, on January 22, 1927, the last fully confirmed Confederate general to die. McCausland is buried in the Smith family cemetery in Henderson, West Virginia. Eight years after his death, McCausland's son, Sam, shot and killed World War I Medal of Honor recipient Chester H. West, who was working for Sam as a farmhand, over what may have been a fight over Gen. John McCausland's gun. Sam was convicted of second-degree murder.

Much of General McCausland's former farm was acquired by the State of West Virginia in 1981, and initially operated as John McCausland Memorial Farm. The living history museum (many of the 32 buildings moved from other areas) is now known as Smithland Farm. McCausland descendants still farm nearby. A documentary was commissioned by the West Virginia Department of Transportation as part of a mitigation to use McCausland Family property for its development of U.S. Route 35. The film, The Legacy of the Land, is part of the PBS library and is told in two parts. Part one, The Legacy, explores General McCausland's Civil War history, along with that of Native Americans, the Battle of Point Pleasant, and other notable figures from the Kanawha Valley and part two, The Land, meets up with the modern day McCauslands and other farmers in the region to discuss the history and its impact upon their agricultural pursuits. It is narrated by actor Chris Sarandon, who is also from West Virginia.

The tiling method used by Gen. McCausland was abandoned in another part of the farm which became the McClintic Wildlife Management Area.

== See also ==
- List of American Civil War generals (Confederate)
- Gen. John McCausland House
- Smithland Farm
