= Virgil A. Lewis =

American lawyer

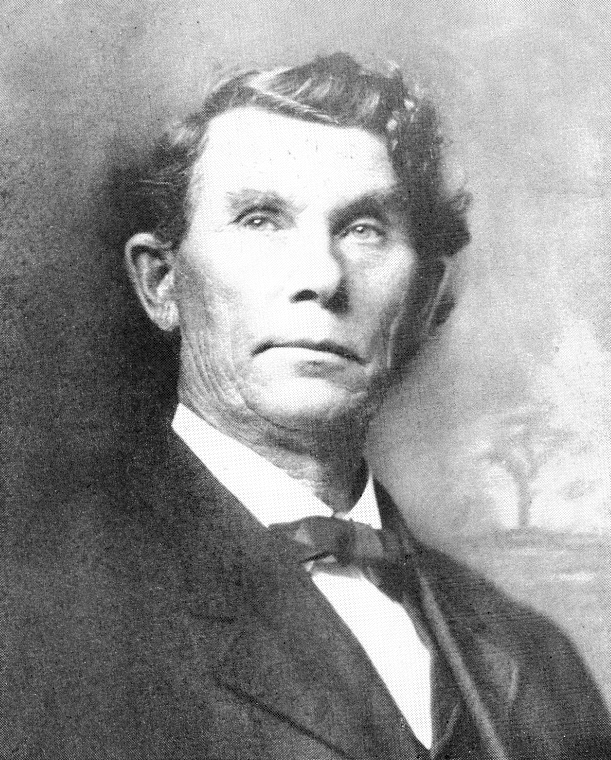
- Born: July 6, 1848; West Columbia, Virginia, United States
- Died: December 5, 1912 (aged 64); Mason City, West Virginia, United States
- Education: West Virginia University (M.A., 1893)
- Occupations: Historian, teacher, lawyer, mayor
- Spouse: Elizabeth Stone (m. 1886)

Virgil Anson Lewis (July 6, 1848 – December 5, 1912) was a lawyer, teacher and historian of the U.S. state of West Virginia, as well as (for one term in 1891) mayor of Mason City, West Virginia. His state history was used in West Virginia schools for five decades; Lewis was the first State Historian and Archivist of West Virginia (1905–1912).

== Early and family life ==
Lewis was born in a log cabin in West Columbia, Mason County, West Virginia, to George W. Lewis Jr. (1819-1858) and his wife, the former Lucie Edwards (1814-1885). His Scotch-Irish ancestors had settled in the Shenandoah Valley of Virginia, then crossed the Allegheny Mountains to settle first in Greenbrier County. His great-grandfather Benjamin Lewis has fought as a patriot in the American Revolutionary War and after receiving a wound at the Battle of Point Pleasant returned to build cabins in what was then wilderness near Point Pleasant in the Kanawha Valley in 1797. The family grew to include three sons and two daughters before George Lewis died in 1858. Virgil Lewis, as the eldest male (though only nine years old), then worked to support the family on a nearby farm. He continued his education, however, at a field school in winter, then worked as a printer's assistant and later as a shipping clerk. In 1886, he married Elizabeth Stone (1862-1941) of Mason City. They had a daughter Anna Lucy (1888-1976) and their son Hale V. Lewis was born in 1890.

== Career ==
Lewis began teaching in his native Mason county, and also drew attention with historical sketches that were published. In 1878 he became principal of the Buffalo Academy in neighboring Putnam County. While there, Lewis also studied law under the direction of James M. Hoge and was admitted to the West Virginia bar in 1879, and also to the federal district and circuit court bars. Ultimately, Lewis decided not to practice as a lawyer, instead returning to teaching, writing and his mayoral duties.

Lewis had a passion for history, notwithstanding his extremely limited formal education. The Virginia Historical Society elected Lewis as a corresponding member in 1880, and he later became a member of the Historical Society of Pennsylvania. In 1882 Lewis traveled through the southern states and decided to write a history of his native West Virginia, which was published by Hubbard Brothers in Philadelphia in 1889. Two years later, the West Virginia legislature passed a joint resolution recommending it as a standard authority and a reference work for schools across the state. In 1890 Lewis helped organize the West Virginia Historical and Antiquarian Society, and in 1892 became editor of the Southern Historical Magazine.

Although Lewis received more votes, B.S. Morgan became State Superintendent of Free Schools in 1892. Lewis received an A.M. in history from West Virginia University the following year, and also published the first state manual of primary education. His 1896 textbook History and Government of West Virginia was utilized statewide in public schools for over fifty years. In 1905, Governor William M. O. Dawson appointed Lewis first director of the Bureau of Archives and History, and he served in that position until his death.

== Death and legacy ==
Lewis died at his home in Mason City on December 5, 1912. His papers are held by Marshall University and by West Virginia University. His former home in Mason City, now known as the Shumaker-Lewis House, was placed on the National Register of Historic Places in 1979. The West Virginia Historical Society's Virgil A. Lewis Award is named in his honor.

== Works ==
- Lewis, Virgil A. and Brock, Robert Alonzo (1884), History of Virginia from Settlement of Jamestown to Close of the Civil War Two volumes; H. H. Hardesty.
- Lewis, Virgil A. (1888), Life and Times of Anne Bailey, the Pioneer Heroine of the Great Kanawha Valley
- Lewis, Virgil A. and Brock, Robert Alonzo (1888), Virginia and Virginians: Eminent Virginians, Vol. I, H.H. Hardesty, Richmond.
- Lewis, Virgil A. (1889), General History of West Virginia
- Lewis, Virgil A. (1892). Southern Historical Magazine: Devoted to History, Genealogy, Biography, Archæology and Kindred Subjects.
- Lewis, Virgil A. (1894), Biennial Report of the State Superintendent of Free Schools, State of West Virginia.
- Lewis, Virgil A. (1894), Manual and Graded Course of Study for the Country and Village Schools of West Virginia.
- Lewis, Virgil A. (1895), The Original Indiana Territory: It was in West Virginia; The Eleventh Amendment to the Federal Constitution, A Paper Read by Virgil A. Lewis, before the Fifth Annual Meeting of the West Virginia Historical and Antiquarian Society, January 17, 1895. Charleston, W.Va.: Press of Butler Printing Co.
- Lewis, Virgil A. (1896), History and Government of West Virginia (Revised editions: 1904, 1912, 1916, 1922, etc.)
- Lewis, Virgil A. (1903), The Story of the Louisiana Purchase
- Lewis, Virgil A. (1904), Handbook of West Virginia: Its History, Natural Resources, Industrial Enterprise and Institutions; Published by West Virginia Commission of the Louisiana Purchase Exposition.
- Lewis, Virgil A. (1909), How West Virginia Was Made: Proceedings of the First Convention of the People Northwestern Virginia at Wheeling May 13, 14 and 15, 1861, and the Journal of the Second Convention of the People of Northwestern Virginia at Wheeling, which Assembled...
- Lewis, Virgil A. (1909), History of the Battle of Point Pleasant; Charleston, West Virginia: Tribune (Reprinted Maryland: Willow Bend, 2000. ISBN 1-888265-59-0.)
- Lewis, Virgil A., "A history of Marshall Academy, Marshall College and Marshall College State Normal School."
- Three biennial reports (1906, 1908, 1911) of the State Department of Archives and History.
  - Extract of 1911 report: Lewis, Virgil A. (1911), The Soldiery of West Virginia in the French and Indian War; Lord Dunmore's War; the Revolution; the Later Indian Wars; the Whiskey Insurrection; the Second War with England; the War with Mexico. And Addenda Relating to West Virginians in the Civil War.
