= HNN =

HNN may refer to:

- HLN (TV channel), an American television news channel
- HNN extension, in combinatorial group theory
- Hanunó'o language, spoken in the Philippines
- Hawaii News Now, a television program
- History News Network, a project of George Washington University
- HNN, Henderson VORTAC, located near Henderson, West Virginia.
