= Pleasant Point =

Pleasant Point may refer to:

== Places ==
In Canada

- Pleasant Point, Nova Scotia

In New Zealand

- Pleasant Point, New Zealand

In the United States

- Pleasant Point, Lincoln County, Kentucky
- Passamaquoddy Pleasant Point Reservation, at Pleasant Point, Maine
- Pleasant Point (Scotland, Virginia), a historic home

== See also ==
- Point Pleasant (disambiguation)
