= Gen. John McCausland House =

Historic house in West Virginia, United States

- U.S. National Register of Historic Places
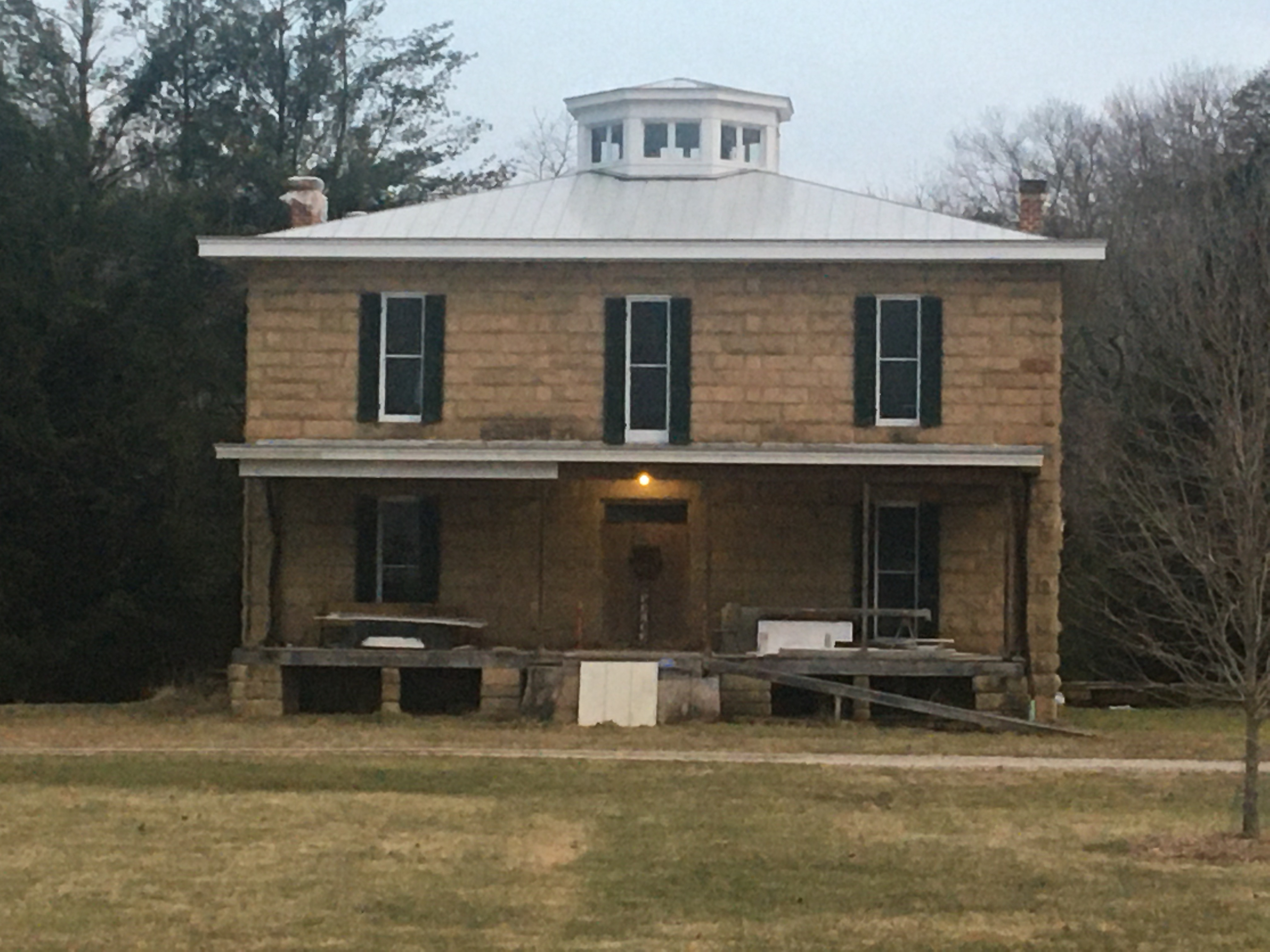
- The front of the house

- Location within West Virginia Location within the United States
- Location: U.S. Route 35; also Grape Hill, Frazier Bottom, West Virginia
- Coordinates: 38°39′26″N 81°58′14″W
- Area: 2 acres (0.81 ha)
- Built: 1885
- Built by: John McCausland
- NRHP reference No.: 80004031 (original); 00000778 (increase)

Significant dates
- Added to NRHP: June 16, 1980
- Boundary increase: July 5, 2000

Gen. John McCausland House, also known as "Grape Hill," is a historic home located near Pliny, Mason County, West Virginia. The main house was built in 1885, and is a two-story sandstone residence. It features a full-length, one story, five bay porch with fluted Doric order columns and metal covered hip roof. The house was built by Confederate General John McCausland (1836–1927). The boundary increase expanded the listing to include 23 additional contributing buildings and 4 contributing structures and designated it a national historic district. They include a variety of farm-related outbuildings and a log house (c. 1834, 1930).

It was listed on the National Register of Historic Places in 1980 and the boundary expanded in 2000.

Beginning in 2015 a complete restoration project began to bring the historic site to its original condition.

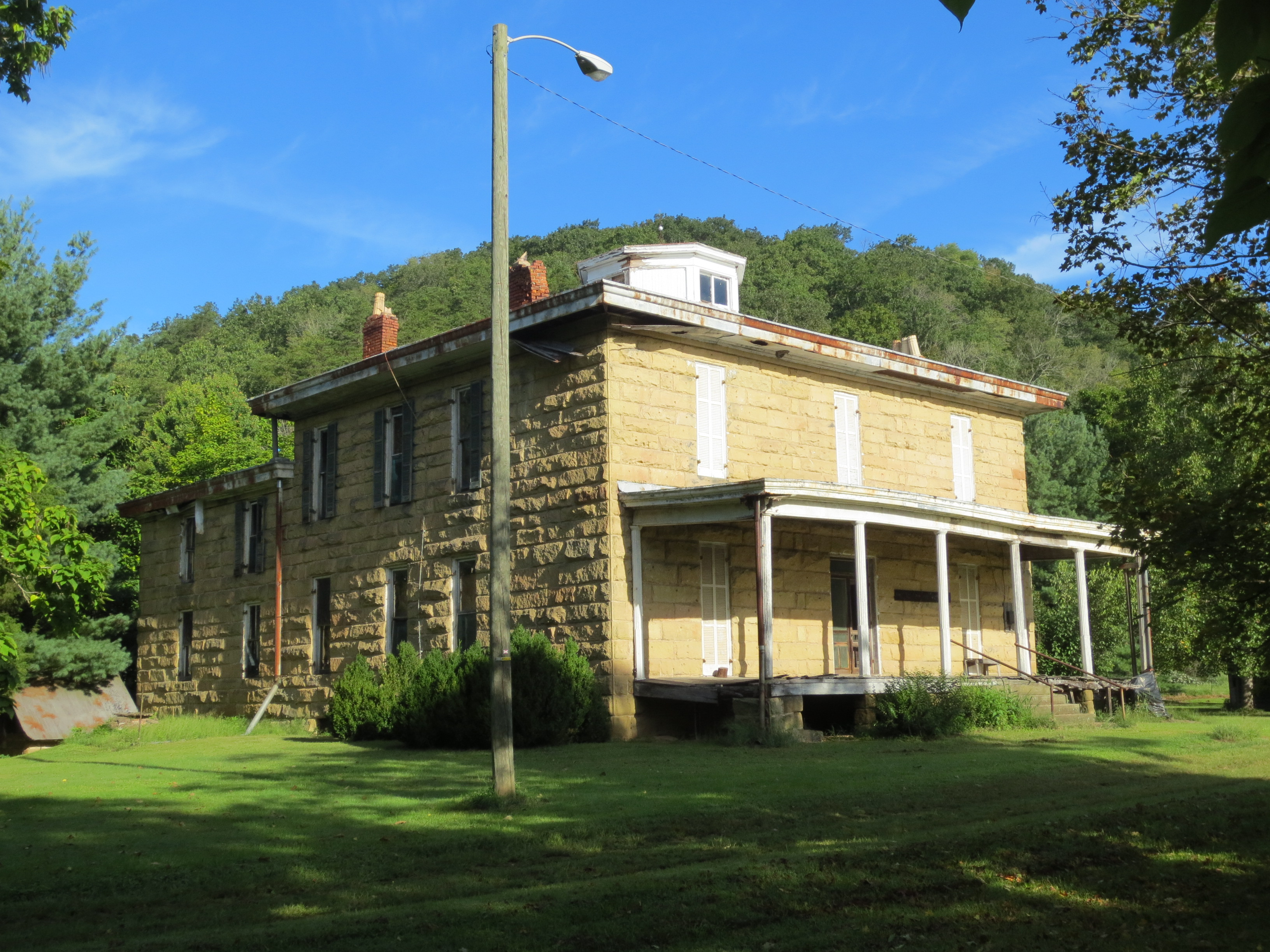
The house in 2014 pre-restoration

== See also ==
- Smithland Farm
