= Chief Cornstalk Wildlife Management Area =

State Wildlife Management Area in Mason County, West Virginia

- IUCN category V (protected landscape/seascape)
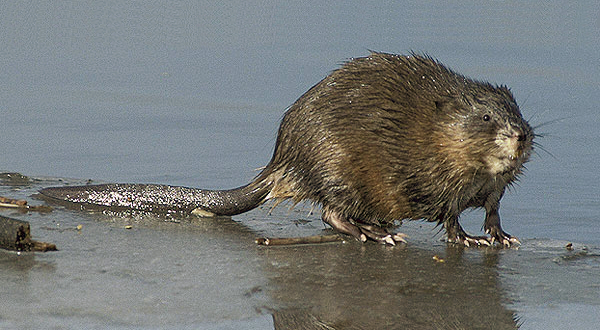
- Muskrat (Ondatra zibethicus) may be found in the Chief Cornstalk WMA

- Location within West Virginia
- Location: Mason, West Virginia, United States
- Coordinates: 38°44′29″N 82°02′26″W
- Area: 11,772 acres (47.64 km^{2})
- Elevation: 750 ft (230 m)
- Operator: Wildlife Resources Section, WVDNR

Chief Cornstalk Wildlife Management Area is located on 11,772 acres (4,764 ha) in Mason County near Southside, West Virginia. Second growth oak-hickory and mixed hardwoods forests cover much of the rolling and moderately steep slopes. Chief Cornstalk WMA can be reached either on Nine Mile Creek Road off US 35 near Southside, or by Crab Creek Road from State Route 2, south of Gallipolis Ferry.

== Hunting, fishing and trapping ==
Hunting opportunities include deer, squirrel, turkey and grouse. A small (5 acres (2.0 ha)) lake provides fishing opportunities for largemouth bass, bluegill and channel catfish, as well as stocked trout. A special permit is required to pursue trapping of muskrat, raccoon, mink or fox.

A shooting range is available for gun enthusiasts. Rustic camping sites are available for tents and small trailers.

== See also ==
- Animal conservation
- Animal trapping
- Cornstalk (Shawnee leader)
- Fishing
- Hunting
- List of West Virginia wildlife management areas
