= Mason County Airport (West Virginia) =

- IATA: none; ICAO: none; FAA LID: 3I2

Summary
- Airport type: Public
- Owner: Mason County Commission
- Serves: Point Pleasant, West Virginia
- Elevation AMSL: 643 ft / 196 m
- Coordinates: 38°54′53″N 082°05′55″W

Map
- Location of airport in West Virginia

Runways
Direction	Length		Surface
Direction	ft	m	Surface
7/25	4,000	1,219	Asphalt

Statistics (2012)
- Aircraft operations: 1,810
- Based aircraft: 9
- Source: Federal Aviation Administration

Mason County Airport (FAA LID: 3I2) is a public use airport in Mason County, West Virginia, United States. It is owned by the Mason County Commission and located four nautical miles (5 mi, 7 km) northeast of the central business district of Point Pleasant, West Virginia. This airport is included in the National Plan of Integrated Airport Systems for 2011–2015, which categorized it as a general aviation facility.

== Facilities and aircraft ==
Mason County Airport covers an area of 124 acres (50 ha) at an elevation of 643 feet (196 m) above mean sea level. It has one runway designated 7/25 with an asphalt surface measuring 4,000 by 75 feet (1,219 x 23 m).

For the 12-month period ending July 1, 2012, the airport had 1,810 aircraft operations, an average of 150 per month: 93.9% general aviation, 5.5% air taxi, and 0.6% military. At that time there were nine aircraft based at this airport: 56% single-engine, 22% ultralight, 11% multi-engine, and 11% helicopter.

== See also ==
- List of airports in West Virginia
