= Virginia Mae Brown =

Civil servant, government official, and lawyer

- Born: November 13, 1923; Pliny, West Virginia
- Died: February 15, 1991 (aged 67); Charleston, West Virginia
- Occupation: Civil servant
- Known for: Interstate Commerce Commission chairperson

Virginia Mae Brown (November 13, 1923 – February 15, 1991) was an American civil servant, government official, and lawyer. Among her many "firsts", she became West Virginia's first female assistant attorney general by working for Attorney General John G. Fox. She was later named West Virginia's insurance commissioner, the first female to hold this position in the United States. President Lyndon B. Johnson appointed Brown a member of the Interstate Commerce Commission (ICC), the first female since its inception in 1887, and later promoted her to be its first female chair.

== Early life ==
Virginia May Brown was born in Pliny, West Virginia

Brown was appointed a member of the Interstate Commerce Commission (ICC) in March 1964 by President Lyndon B. Johnson, the first female since its inception in 1887. She was promoted to vice chairman of the commission in 1968. In 1969, President Johnson promoted her as the first female chair of the Interstate Commerce Commission for a one-year term.

Brown served in 1967 as a delegate on the Inland Transport Committee to the United Nations. The meeting took place in Geneva, Switzerland.

== Later life and death ==
After Brown left the Interstate Commerce Commission in 1979, she was president and chair of the board of the Buffalo Bank of Eleanor. From 1983 through 1991 she served in the United States Department of Health and Human Services office of hearing appeals in Charleston, West Virginia, in the position of chief administrative law judge. She died of a heart attack in Charleston on February 15, 1991.

== Personal life ==
Brown had two daughters.

== Legacy ==
Brown was the first woman to serve as executive secretary to the West Virginia Judicial Council (1949) and as executive secretary to the Judicial Council of West Virginia (1944–1952). She was the first woman in West Virginia to be the state's assistant attorney general (1952–1961); the first woman insurance commissioner in the United States (1961); the first woman to be West Virginia Public Service Commission member (1962); and the first woman chairperson of an independent federal agency, the United States Interstate Commerce Commission (1969–1970).

== Bibliography ==
- Read, Phyllis J.; Witlieb, Bernard L. (1992). The Book of Women's Firsts: Breakthrough Achievements of Almost 1,000 American Women. Random House Information Group. ISBN 978-0-679-40975-5.
