= Smithland Farm =

Historic house in West Virginia, United States

- U.S. National Register of Historic Places
- Location within West Virginia Location within the United States
- Location: U.S. Route 35 between Lower Nine Mile Rd. and Lower Five Mile Rd., near Henderson, West Virginia
- Coordinates: 38°46′42″N 82°3′2″W
- Area: 800 acres (320 ha)
- Built: 1869
- Architectural style: Greek Revival, Colonial Revival
- NRHP reference No.: 03001061
- Added to NRHP: October 17, 2003

Smithland Farm, also known as the General John McCausland Memorial Farm, is a historic home and farm located near Henderson, Mason County, West Virginia. The main house is a two-story frame structure constructed in 1869. The house is a side-gabled, two-story, weatherboarded frame structure with a two-story frame wing. The property includes a contributing corncrib (c. 1950), silo (c. 1930), pole barn (c. 1930s), barn (early 1900s), main barn (early 1900s), block school (c. 1915–1920), and Poffenbarger Cemetery (late 1900s). It was for many years part of a larger farm owned by Confederate General John McCausland. The West Virginia Department of Agriculture acquired the farm in 1981.

It was listed on the National Register of Historic Places in 2003.

== See also ==
- Gen. John McCausland House
