= Point Pleasant High School =

Point Pleasant High School may refer to one of several high schools in the United States:

- Point Pleasant Borough High School in Point Pleasant, New Jersey
- Point Pleasant High School (West Virginia) in Point Pleasant, West Virginia
