= Pleasant Point, Lincoln County, Kentucky =

Unincorporated community in Kentucky, United States

- Unincorporated community
- Location in Kentucky Location in the United States
- Coordinates: 37°23′25″N 84°39′43″W
- Country: United States
- State: Kentucky
- County: Lincoln
- Elevation: 1,247 ft (380 m)
- Time zone: UTC-5 (Eastern (EST))
  - Summer (DST): UTC-4 (EDT)
- GNIS feature ID: 2566665

Pleasant Point was an unincorporated community located in Lincoln County, Kentucky, United States.
