= Couch-Artrip House =

Historic house in West Virginia, United States

- U.S. National Register of Historic Places
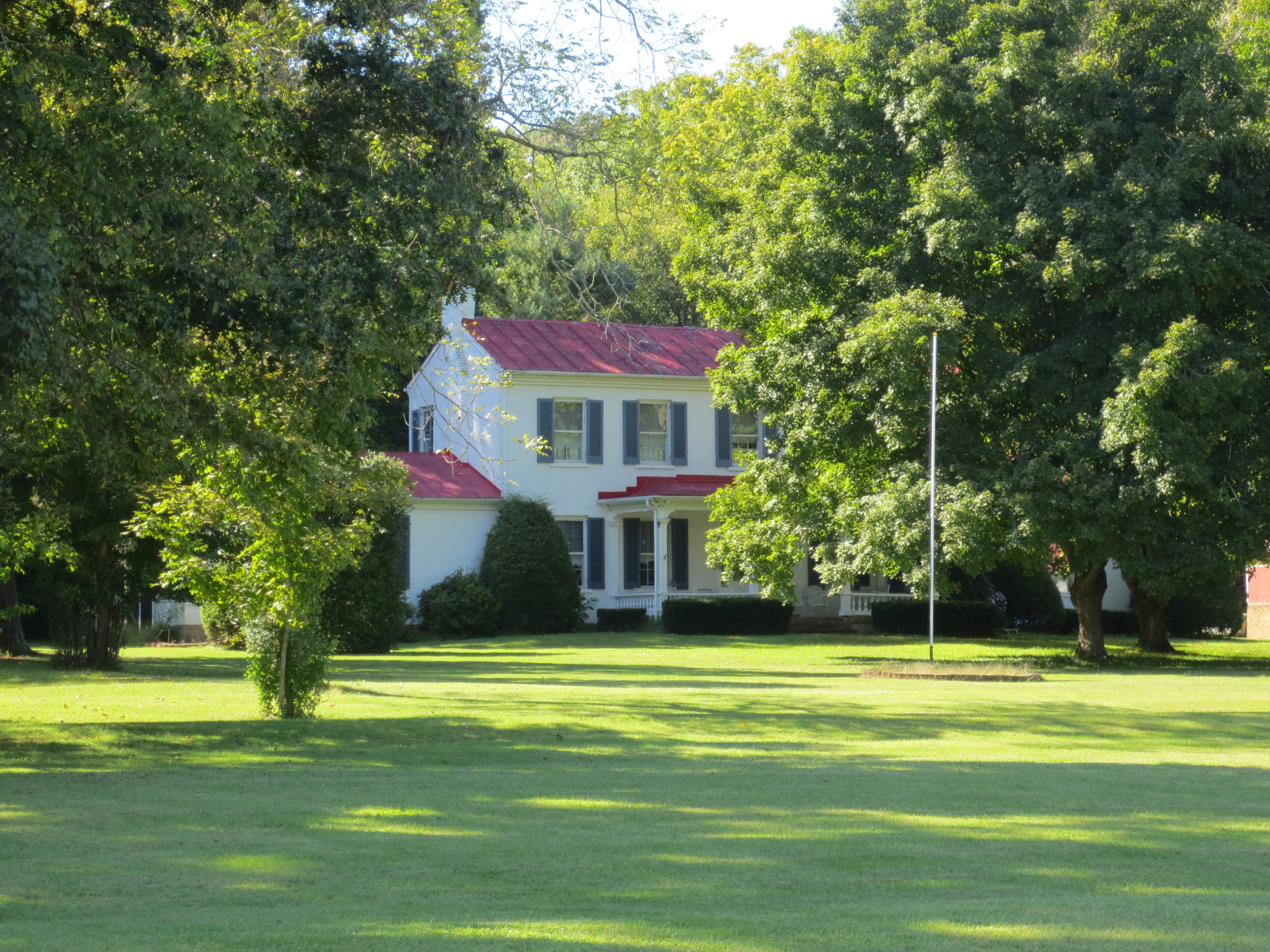

- Location within West Virginia Location within the United States
- Location: U.S. Route 35, near Southside, West Virginia
- Coordinates: 38°42′11″N 81°58′4″W
- Area: 6 acres (2.4 ha)
- Built: c. 1830
- Architect: Samuel Couch
- Architectural style: Greek Revival
- NRHP reference No.: 84003623
- Added to NRHP: August 23, 1984

Couch-Artrip House, also known as "Longmeadow" and "The Holmwood," is a historic home located near Southside, Mason County, West Virginia. It was built about 1830, and is a two-story brick residence in a vernacular Greek Revival-style. It features an Italianate style front porch and one-story addition, added about 1875. It also has a corbeled cornice composed of four brick courses. Also on the property are a two-room, one-story Greek Revival office / school room and a log building.

It was listed on the National Register of Historic Places in 1984.
