= Mason, West Virginia =

- Town
- Seal

- Location of Mason in Mason County, West Virginia.
- Coordinates: 39°1′11″N 82°1′51″W
- Country: United States
- State: West Virginia
- County: Mason

Area
  - Total: 0.58 sq mi (1.51 km^{2})
  - Land: 0.58 sq mi (1.51 km^{2})
  - Water: 0 sq mi (0.00 km^{2})
- Elevation: 584 ft (178 m)

Population (2020)
  - Total: 866
  - Estimate (2021): 854
  - Density: 1,604.6/sq mi (619.53/km^{2})
- Time zone: UTC−5 (Eastern (EST))
  - Summer (DST): UTC−4 (EDT)
- ZIP Code: 25260
- Area code: 304
- FIPS code: 54-52180
- GNIS feature ID: 1542846
- Website: townofmason.com

Mason, also known as Mason City, is a town in Mason County, West Virginia, United States. The population was 865 at the 2020 census. It is part of the Point Pleasant, WV–OH Micropolitan Statistical Area.

Mason was initially known as Waggener's Bottom. It was chartered by the Virginia General Assembly in 1856, and named for Mason County, which was named for George Mason, a delegate to the U.S. Constitutional Convention.

== History ==
The Gold Houses and Shumaker-Lewis House are listed on the National Register of Historic Places.

== Geography ==
Mason is located at 39°1′11″N 82°1′51″W (39.019760, -82.030952), along the Ohio River.

According to the United States Census Bureau, the town has a total area of 0.59 square miles (1.53 km^{2}), all land.

== Demographics ==
Historical population
Census	Pop.	Note	%±
1870	1,182		—
1880	1,186		0.3%
1890	1,029		−13.2%
1900	904		−12.1%
1910	784		−13.3%
1920	992		26.5%
1930	691		−30.3%
1940	795		15.1%
1950	924		16.2%
1960	1,005		8.8%
1970	1,319		31.2%
1980	1,432		8.6%
1990	1,053		−26.5%
2000	1,064		1.0%
2010	968		−9.0%
2020	866		−10.5%
2021 (est.)	854	▼	−1.4%
U.S. Decennial Census

=== 2010 census ===
As of the census of 2010, there were 968 people, 428 households, and 272 families living in the town. The population density was 1,640.7 inhabitants per square mile (633.5/km^{2}). There were 495 housing units at an average density of 839.0 per square mile (323.9/km^{2}). The racial makeup of the town was 95.8% White, 0.3% African American, 0.7% Native American, 1.4% Asian, and 1.8% from two or more races.

There were 428 households, of which 29.0% had children under the age of 18 living with them, 41.1% were married couples living together, 16.4% had a female householder with no husband present, 6.1% had a male householder with no wife present, and 36.4% were non-families. 32.5% of all households were made up of individuals, and 14.4% had someone living alone who was 65 years of age or older. The average household size was 2.26 and the average family size was 2.80.

The median age in the town was 45.3 years. 22.2% of residents were under the age of 18; 6.2% were between the ages of 18 and 24; 21.1% were from 25 to 44; 29.4% were from 45 to 64; and 21% were 65 years of age or older. The gender makeup of the town was 47.1% male and 52.9% female.

=== 2000 census ===
As of the census of 2000, there were 1,064 people, 475 households, and 317 families living in the town. The population density was 1,900.8 inhabitants per square mile (733.9/km^{2}). There were 535 housing units at an average density of 955.8 per square mile (369.0/km^{2}). The racial makeup of the town was 96.71% White, 0.09% African American, 1.60% Native American, 0.28% Asian, and 1.32% from two or more races. Hispanic or Latino of any race were 0.47% of the population.

There were 475 households, out of which 26.5% had children under the age of 18 living with them, 49.3% were married couples living together, 13.9% had a female householder with no husband present, and 33.1% were non-families. 29.9% of all households were made up of individuals, and 15.2% had someone living alone who was 65 years of age or older. The average household size was 2.24 and the average family size was 2.75.

In the town, the population was spread out, with 20.9% under the age of 18, 9.6% from 18 to 24, 24.1% from 25 to 44, 24.9% from 45 to 64, and 20.6% who were 65 years of age or older. The median age was 41 years. For every 100 females, there were 89.7 males. For every 100 females age 18 and over, there were 88.4 males.

The median income for a household in the town was $24,621, and the median income for a family was $30,833. Males had a median income of $31,389 versus $17,500 for females. The per capita income for the town was $14,020. About 15.6% of families and 19.8% of the population were below the poverty line, including 37.2% of those under age 18 and 10.4% of those age 65 or over.

== See also ==
- List of cities and towns along the Ohio River
