= Maplewood (Pliny, West Virginia) =

Historic house in West Virginia, United States

- U.S. National Register of Historic Places
- U.S. Historic district
- Location within West Virginia Location within the United States
- Location: 1951 U.S. Route 35, near Pliny, West Virginia
- Coordinates: 38°40′40″N 81°57′59″W
- Area: 800 acres (320 ha)
- Built: 1870
- Architectural style: Italianate
- NRHP reference No.: 00000251
- Added to NRHP: February 16, 2001

"Maplewood", also known as Sebrell-McCausland Farm, is a historic home and national historic district located near Pliny, Mason County, West Virginia. The district includes eight contributing buildings and four contributing sites. The main house is a two-story Italianate-style brick farmhouse with wood siding. It features two round attic portholes and three porches. Also on the property are the following contributing buildings / sites: a coal house, chicken house, blacksmith shop, and well house all built about 1870; the Jenny Lind House (c. 1880); a schoolhouse / storage shed (c. 1890); machine shed (c. 1910); the ruins of the main barn and hog barn (c. 1870); and the Sebrell-McCausland Cemetery and Slave Cemetery, both established about 1850.

It was listed on the National Register of Historic Places in 2000.
