= The Gold Houses =

Historic houses in West Virginia, United States

- U.S. National Register of Historic Places
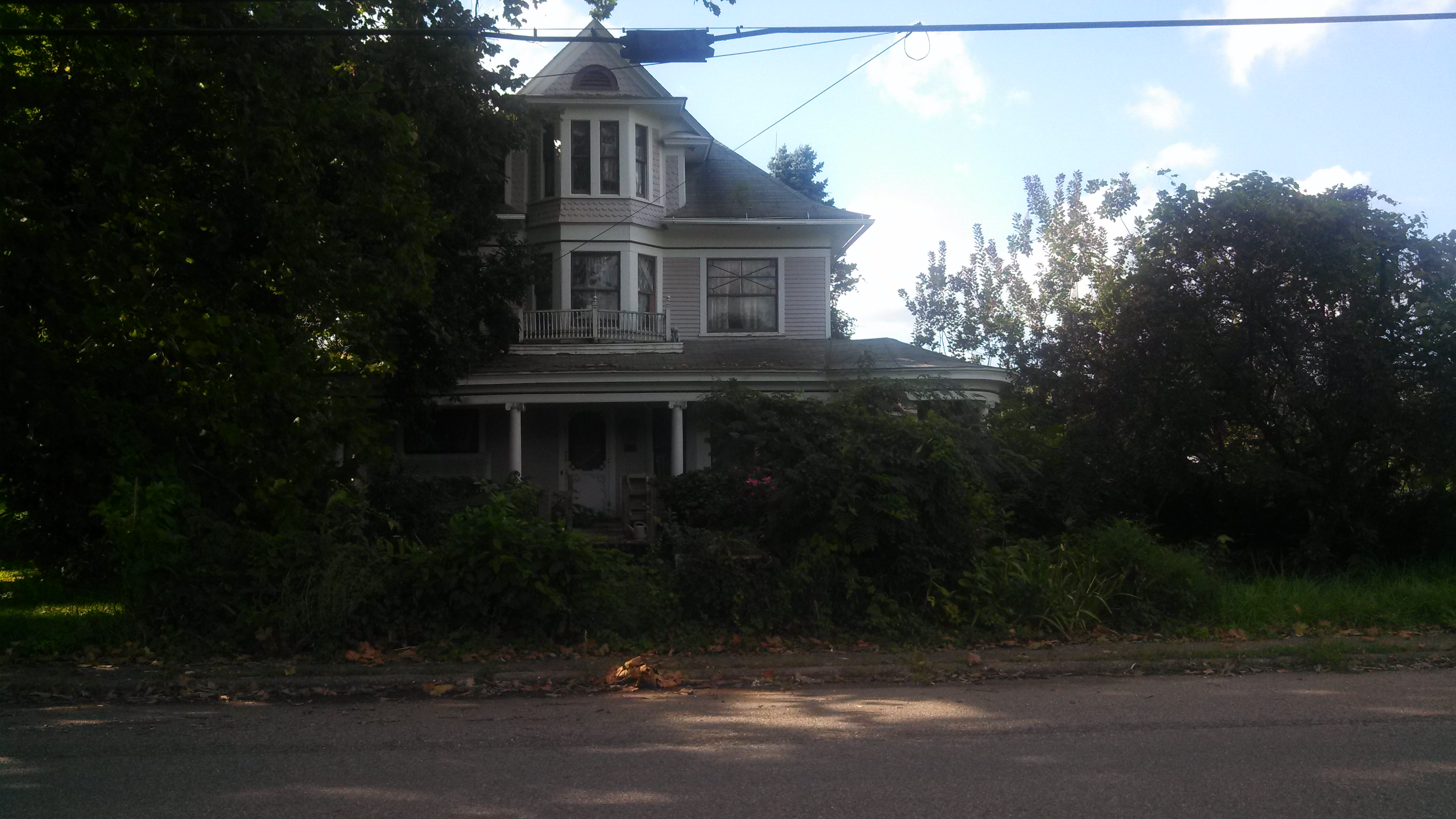

- Location within West Virginia Location within the United States
- Location: 503 and 505 N. Second St., Mason, West Virginia
- Coordinates: 39°1′29″N 82°1′28″W
- Area: 1 acre (0.40 ha)
- Built: 1908
- Architectural style: Queen Anne
- NRHP reference No.: 97000784
- Added to NRHP: July 9, 1997

The Gold Houses, also known as the Gold Brothers' Houses, are two historic homes located at Mason, Mason County, West Virginia. The two houses were built in 1908, and are 2 1/2-story, mirrored pair frame dwellings in the Queen Anne style. They feature pyramidal shaped slate roofs that curve outward to the eaves. They also have wraparound porches enclosed by a spindled balustrade with a circular roof at one corner. Also on the property are a rusticated concrete block garage with a gambrel roof and an original privy.

It was listed on the National Register of Historic Places in 1997.

In 2004, one of the houses was set on fire by its then current occupant for what was believed to be insurance fraud, although this was never proven and no charges were ever filed. The house stood empty for a few more years, never being reconstructed and was demolished in the latter part of the decade.
