= McClintic Wildlife Management Area =

State Wildlife Management Area in Mason County, West Virginia

- IUCN category V (protected landscape/seascape)
- Location within West Virginia
- Location: Mason, West Virginia, United States
- Coordinates: 38°54′37″N 82°04′10″W
- Area: 3,655 acres (14.79 km^{2})
- Elevation: 585 ft (178 m)
- Operator: Wildlife Resources Section, WV Division of Natural Resources

The Clifton F. McClintic Wildlife Management Area, known locally as "the TNT area", is a naturalized area located in Mason County about 5 miles (8 km) north of Point Pleasant, West Virginia. Located on 3,655 acres (1,479 ha) of former wartime industrial land, the WMA is occupied by farmland, woodlands, and wetlands encompassing 31 ponds. The area still contains stored explosives.

In the late 1960s, the area was the location of supposed sightings of a paranormal Mothman creature.

== Hunting and fishing ==
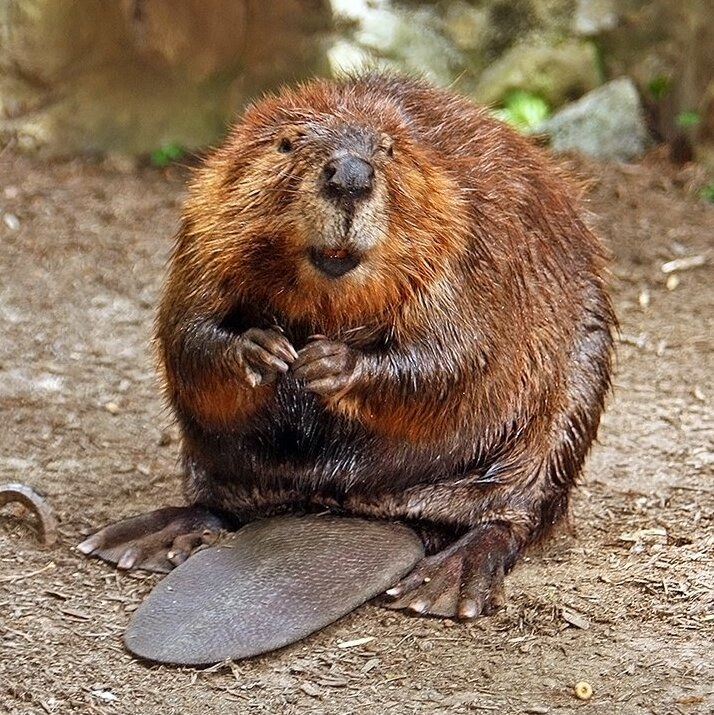
North American beaver (Castor canadensis) may be found in the McClintic WMA

Hunting opportunities include deer, mourning dove, grouse, rabbit, raccoon, squirrel, waterfowl, woodcock, and turkey. Special regulations for deer hunting have been established for the WMA to create a "trophy buck hunting" area. Only bucks with an antler spread of 14 inches (360 mm) or more may be killed in the WMA.

Trapping opportunities include beaver, mink, muskrat, and raccoon. A special permit from the District Wildlife Biologist is required to run traps on WMA land.

Fishing opportunities abound in the 29 ponds available for fishing and in the nearby Ohio River. Warmwater species fishing opportunities can include walleye, musky, tiger musky, channel catfish, hybrid striped bass, saugeye, sunfish, largemouth bass, and smallmouth bass.

Rustic camping is available seasonally in the WMA. A 100-yard (90 m) shooting range is also available.

== See also ==
- Animal conservation
- Camping
- Fishing
- Hunting
- Mothman
- List of West Virginia wildlife management areas
- West Virginia Ordnance Works
