= Lewis-Capehart-Roseberry House =

Historic house in West Virginia, United States

- U.S. National Register of Historic Places
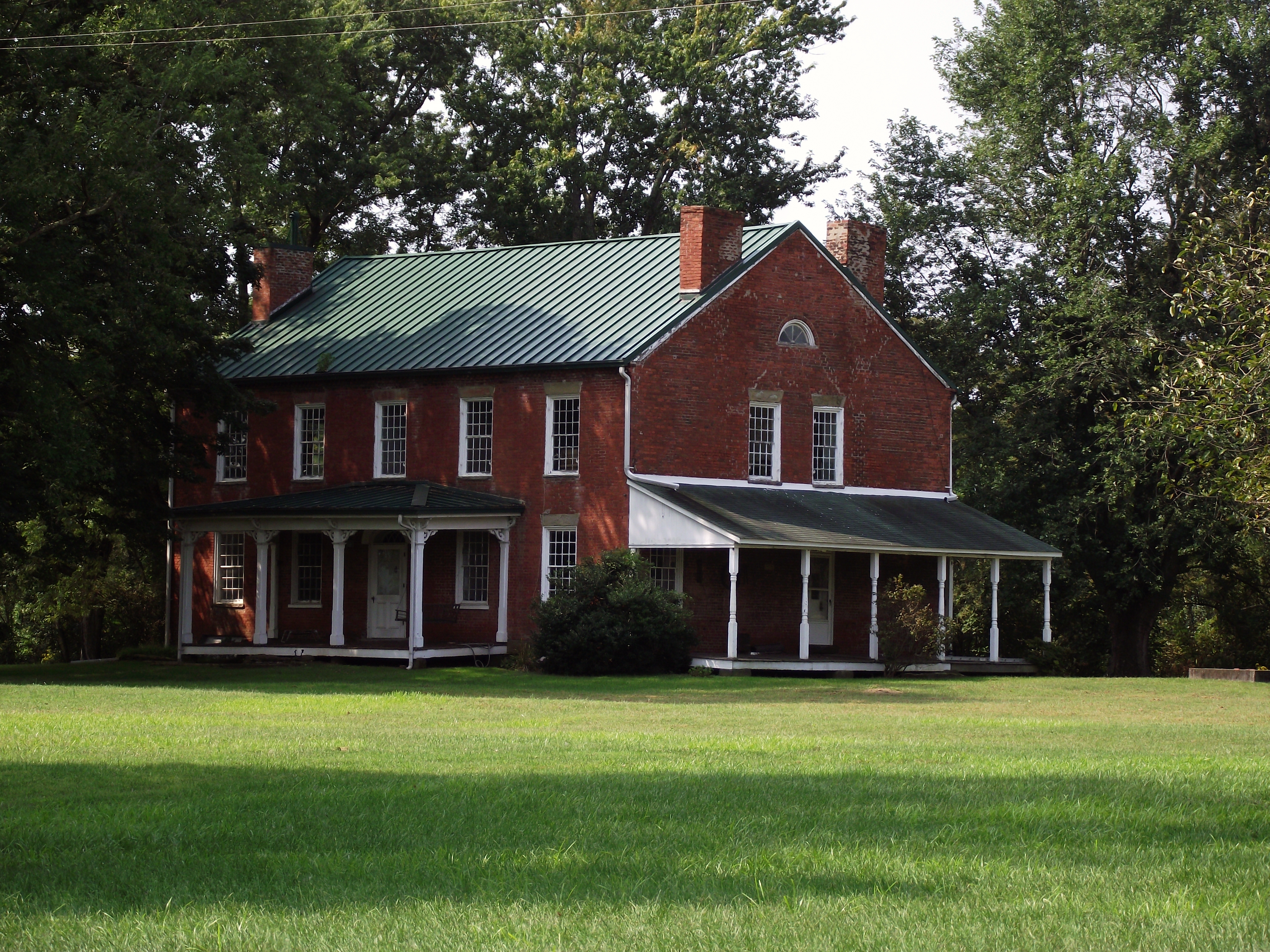

- Location within West Virginia Location within the United States
- Location: 1 Roseberry Lane, Point Pleasant, West Virginia
- Coordinates: 38°52′36″N 82°8′5″W
- Area: 4.8 acres (1.9 ha)
- Built: c. 1820
- Architectural style: Federal
- NRHP reference No.: 79002590
- Added to NRHP: August 29, 1979

Lewis-Capehart-Roseberry House, also known as "Roseberry," is a historic home located at Point Pleasant, Mason County, West Virginia. It was built about 1820, and is a spacious two story, double-pile, brick residence with a gable roof in the Federal-style. It features sandstone lintels and sills.

It was listed on the National Register of Historic Places in 1979.
