= Eastham House =

Historic house in West Virginia, United States

- U.S. National Register of Historic Places
- Location within West Virginia Location within the United States
- Location: U.S. Route 35, near Point Pleasant, West Virginia
- Coordinates: 38°47′27″N 82°3′53″W
- Area: 8 acres (3.2 ha)
- Built: 1850
- Architectural style: Greek Revival
- NRHP reference No.: 88002669
- Added to NRHP: February 24, 1989

Eastham House, also known as Glenn Manor, is a historic home located at Point Pleasant, Mason County, West Virginia. It was built about 1850, and is a two-story, L-shaped, brick residence with a low-pitched, slate-covered gable roof in the Greek Revival-style. Also on the property is a contributing c. 1820 smokehouse.

It was listed on the National Register of Historic Places in 1988.
