= Elm Grove (Southside, West Virginia) =

Historic house in West Virginia, United States

- U.S. National Register of Historic Places
- U.S. Historic district
- Location within West Virginia Location within the United States
- Location: 2283 US 35 N, Southside, West Virginia
- Coordinates: 38°43′19″N 81°57′18″W
- Area: 17.1 acres (6.9 ha)
- Built: 1803
- Architectural style: Italianate
- NRHP reference No.: 92000897
- Added to NRHP: July 16, 1992

"Elm Grove", also known as Long's Landing, is a historic home and national historic district located at Southside, Mason County, West Virginia. The district includes seven contributing buildings and one contributing structure. The manor house is a High Victorian Italianate-style brick farmhouse built in 1884. It features two round attic portholes and three porches. Also on the property is a two-story contributing log house built in 1803, 1920s bungalow, late 19th century barn, a large sandstone fireplace shaped kiln, three outbuildings, and the site of the first brick manor house built c. 1830.

It was listed on the National Register of Historic Places in 1992.
