= Shumaker-Lewis House =

Historic house in Mason county West Virginia, United States

- U.S. National Register of Historic Places
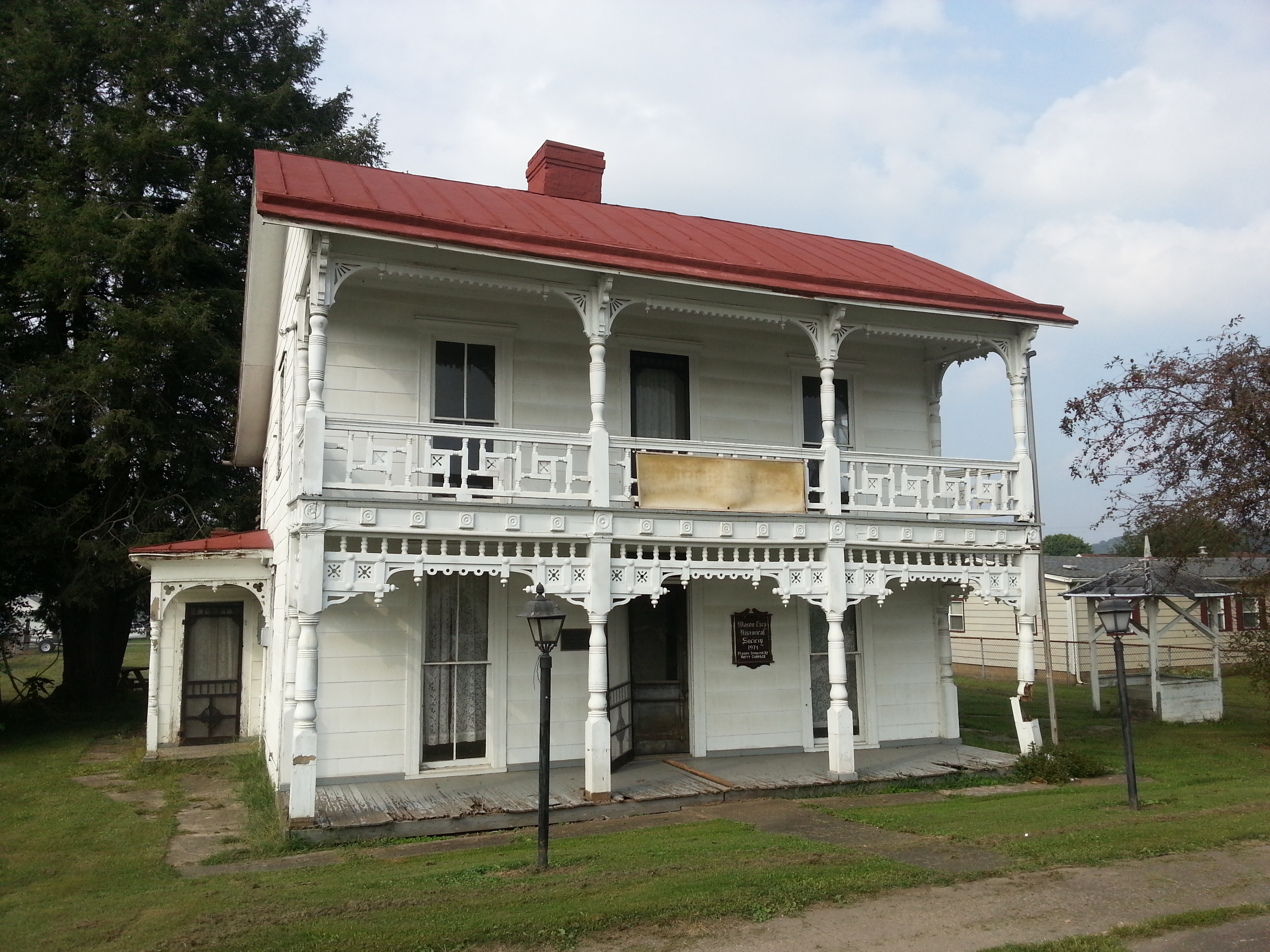

- Location within West Virginia Location within the United States
- Location: Brown St., Mason, West Virginia
- Coordinates: 39°1′9″N 82°1′53″W
- Area: less than one acre
- Built: c. 1885
- NRHP reference No.: 79002589
- Added to NRHP: March 26, 1979

Shumaker-Lewis House, also known as Virgil A. Lewis House, was a historic home located in Mason, West Virginia. It was built about 1885, and was a two-story Victorian-era frame cottage. It featured a two tier Eastlake movement style porch. It was the home of Virgil A. Lewis (1848-1912), the first State Historian and Archivist of West Virginia, 1905–1912. It was the headquarters of the Mason City Historical Society. It was demolished in 2014 and the Virgil A. Lewis Park now occupies the site.

The house was listed on the National Register of Historic Places in 1979.
