= Pliny, West Virginia =

Pliny
- Unincorporated community
- Location within the state of West Virginia Pliny (the United States)
- Coordinates: 38°37′13″N 81°59′14″W
- Country: United States
- State: West Virginia
- County: Mason
- Time zone: UTC-5 (Eastern (EST))
  - Summer (DST): UTC-4 (EDT)
- ZIP codes: 25082
- GNIS feature ID: 1545053

Pliny is an unincorporated community in Putnam County, West Virginia, United States. It was named for M. Pliny Brown, an early settler. The ZIP code is 25158.

Located near Pliny is Maplewood, listed on the National Register of Historic Places in 2000.

== Notable person ==
- Virginia Mae Brown, set many "first woman" records
