= Point Pleasant Historic District (Point Pleasant, West Virginia) =

Historic district in West Virginia, United States

- U.S. National Register of Historic Places
- U.S. Historic district
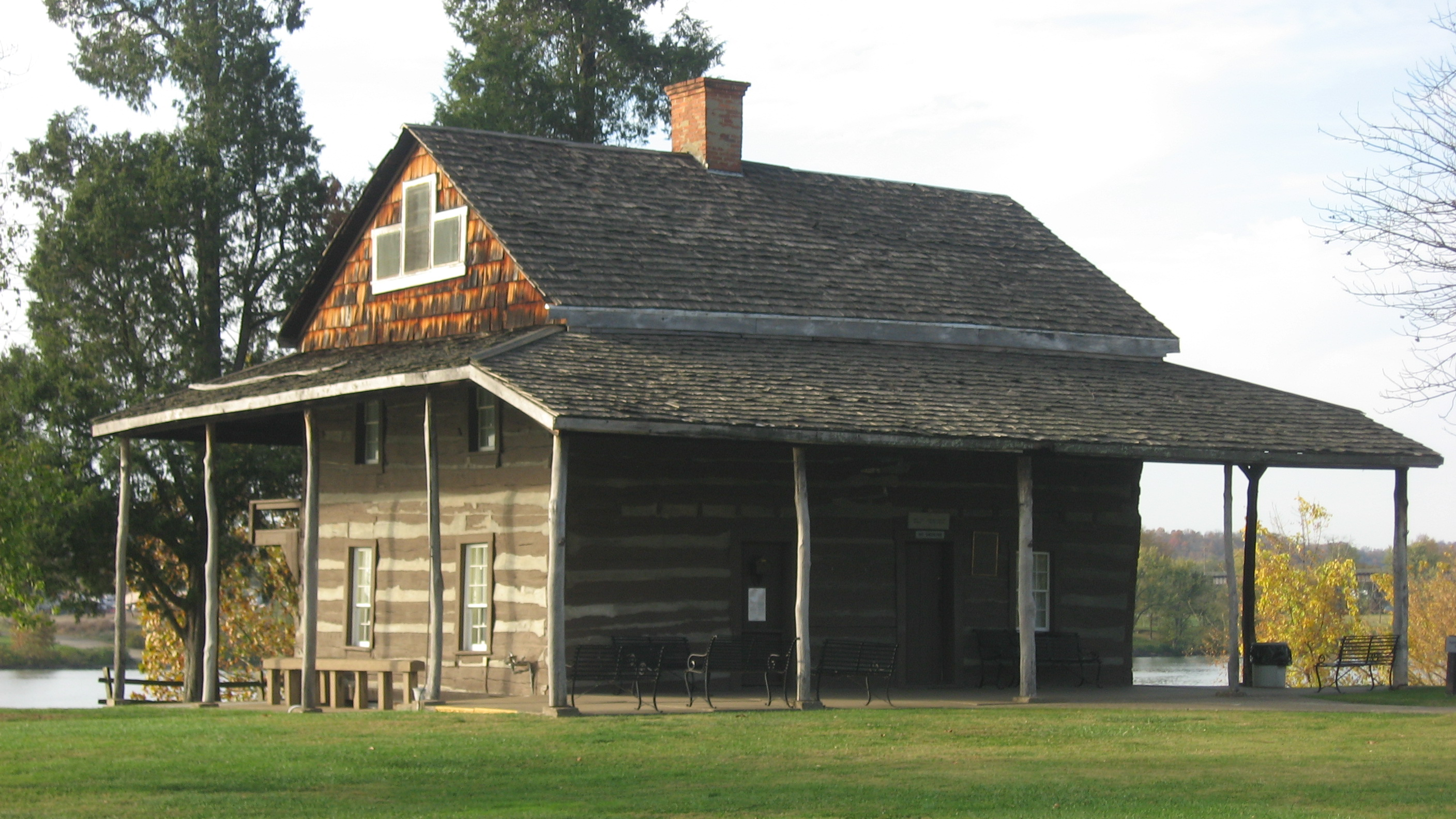
- The Old Mansion House, located at the battleground

- Location within West Virginia Location within the United States
- Location: Main St. between 1st & 11th and Viand St. between 8th & 10th, Point Pleasant, West Virginia
- Coordinates: 38°50′40″N 82°8′18″W
- Area: 36.7 acres (14.9 ha)
- Built: 1749
- Architectural style: Late 19th And 20th Century Revivals, Late Victorian, Federal
- NRHP reference No.: 85001465
- Added to NRHP: July 1, 1985

Point Pleasant Historic District is a national historic district located at Point Pleasant, Mason County, West Virginia. The district includes 93 contributing buildings and one contributing site in Point Pleasant's central business district and surrounding residential areas. They are in a variety of late 19th- and early 20th-century architectural styles. Notable buildings include the Mansion House (1796), The Church of Christ in Christian Union (1840), Odd Fellows Hall (c. 1906), The Presbyterian Church (1926), Christ Episcopal Church (1869-1873), "Hooff's Opera House" (1905), Pioneer Cemetery, U.S. Post Office Building (1913), and the Poffenbarger House. The Point Pleasant Battleground is located in the district and listed separately on the National Register of Historic Places.

It was listed on the National Register of Historic Places in 1985.
