= Southside, West Virginia =

- Unincorporated community
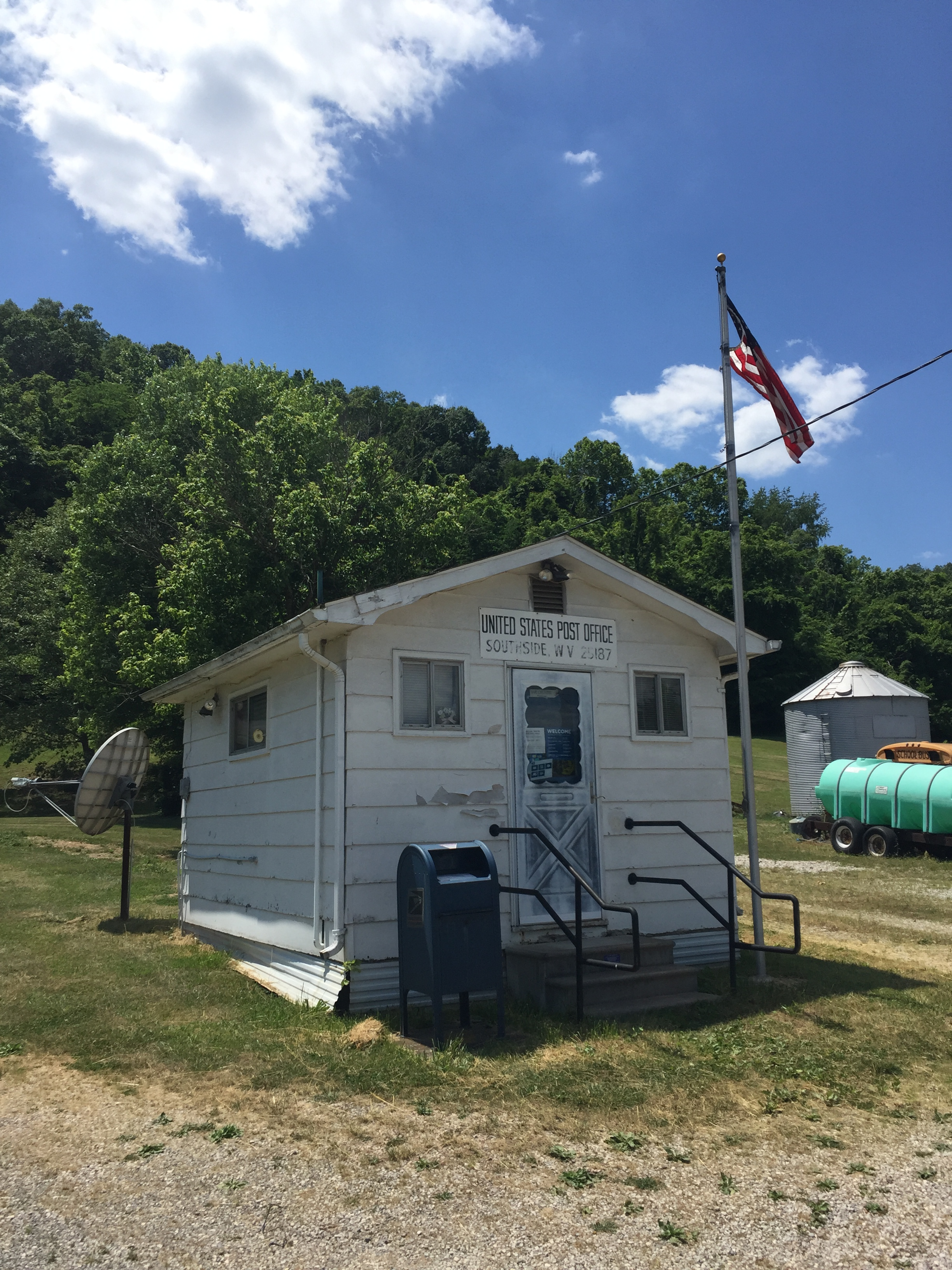
- Southside Post Office

- Location within West Virginia Location within the United States
- Coordinates: 38°43′00″N 81°58′07″W
- Country: United States
- State: West Virginia
- County: Mason
- Elevation: 564 ft (172 m)
- Time zone: UTC-5 (Eastern (EST))
  - Summer (DST): UTC-4 (EDT)
- ZIP code: 25187
- Area codes: 304 & 681
- GNIS feature ID: 1547094

Southside is an unincorporated community in Mason County, West Virginia, United States. Southside is located near the Kanawha River south of Leon. It is served by West Virginia Route 817, which follows a former routing of U.S. Route 35, and by U.S. Route 35 itself, which bypasses the community to the west.

Located near Southside are the Couch-Artrip House and Elm Grove, both of which are listed on the National Register of Historic Places.
