= Henderson, West Virginia =

- Unincorporated Town
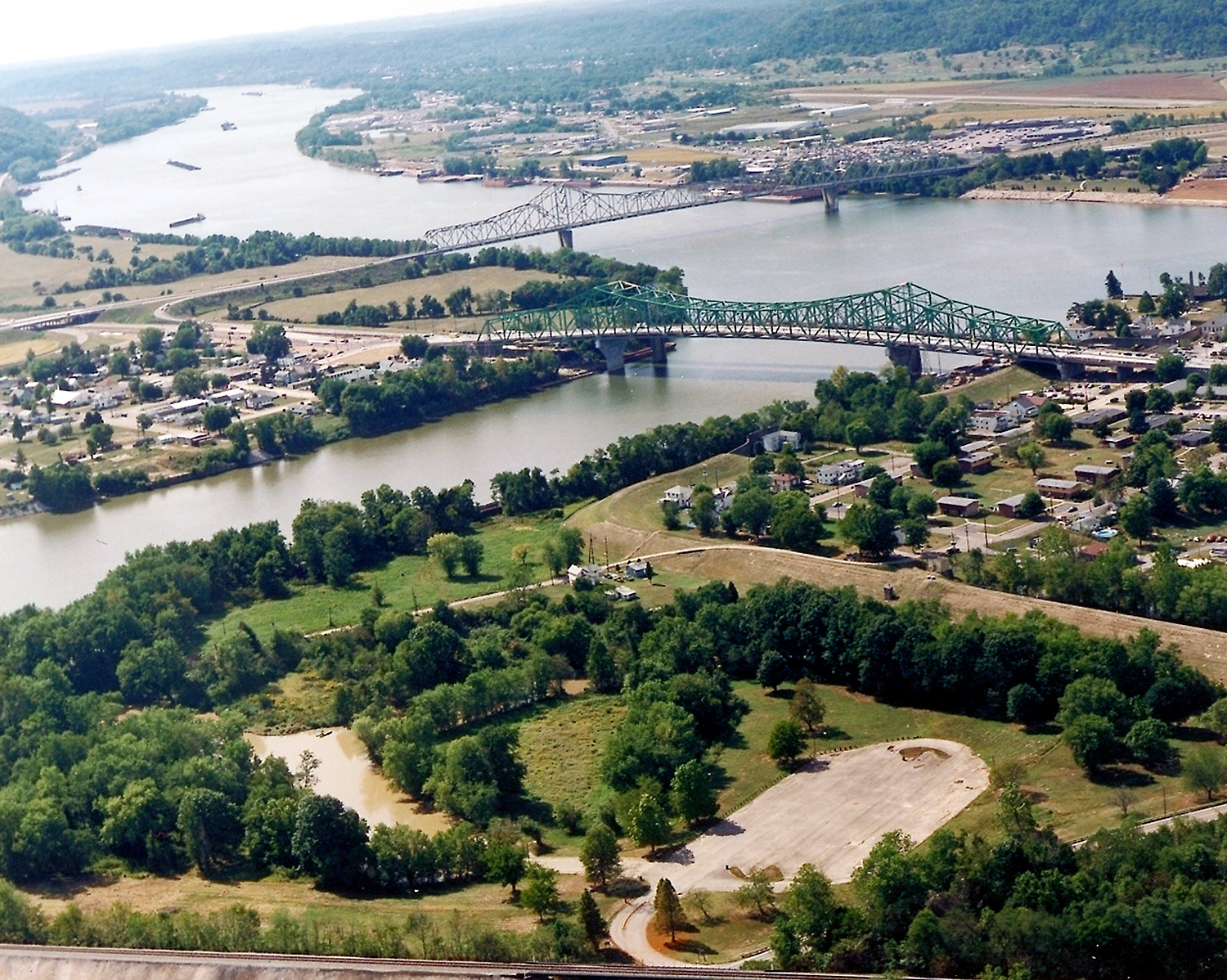
- Henderson (left) at the confluence of the Kanawha and Ohio Rivers

- Location of Henderson in Mason County, West Virginia.
- Coordinates: 38°49′59″N 82°8′14″W
- Country: United States
- State: West Virginia
- County: Mason
- Incorporated (town): 1893
- Dissolved: 2022

Area
  - Total: 0.47 sq mi (1.21 km^{2})
  - Land: 0.42 sq mi (1.08 km^{2})
  - Water: 0.046 sq mi (0.12 km^{2})
- Elevation: 564 ft (172 m)

Population (2020)
  - Total: 228
  - Estimate (2021): 228
  - Density: 620/sq mi (239/km^{2})
- Time zone: UTC-5 (Eastern (EST))
  - Summer (DST): UTC-4 (EDT)
- ZIP code: 25106
- Area code: 304
- FIPS code: 54-36436
- GNIS feature ID: 1554681

Henderson is an unincorporated community and former town in Mason County, West Virginia, United States, at the confluence of the Ohio and Kanawha Rivers. The population was 231 at the 2020 census. It is part of the Point Pleasant, WV–OH Micropolitan Statistical Area. The town was incorporated in 1893 and named for Samuel Bruce Henderson, who owned the townsite at the time. The town was unincorporated following a public hearing on August 11, 2022.

== History ==
Located near Henderson is the General John McCausland Memorial Farm, listed on the National Register of Historic Places in 2003.

== Geography ==
Henderson is located at 38°49′59″N 82°8′14″W (38.833035, -82.137216).

According to the United States Census Bureau, the town has a total area of 0.47 square miles (1.22 km^{2}), of which 0.42 square miles (1.09 km^{2}) is land and 0.05 square miles (0.13 km^{2}) is water.

=== Climate ===
The climate in this area is characterized by relatively high temperatures and evenly distributed precipitation throughout the year. According to the Köppen Climate Classification system, Henderson has a Humid subtropical climate, abbreviated "Cfa" on climate maps.

Climate data for Henderson, West Virginia
Month	Jan	Feb	Mar	Apr	May	Jun	Jul	Aug	Sep	Oct	Nov	Dec	Year
Mean daily maximum °C (°F)	6 (43)	8 (47)	14 (57)	20 (68)	25 (77)	29 (85)	31 (88)	31 (87)	27 (81)	21 (70)	14 (57)	8 (46)	19 (67)
Mean daily minimum °C (°F)	−5 (23)	−4 (25)	0 (32)	5 (41)	11 (51)	16 (60)	18 (64)	17 (62)	13 (55)	6 (43)	1 (34)	−3 (26)	6 (43)
Average precipitation mm (inches)	79 (3.1)	76 (3)	99 (3.9)	89 (3.5)	100 (4.1)	94 (3.7)	110 (4.3)	97 (3.8)	79 (3.1)	64 (2.5)	74 (2.9)	79 (3.1)	1,040 (40.8)
Source: Weatherbase

== Demographics ==
Historical population
Census	Pop.	Note	%±
1900	304		—
1910	286		−5.9%
1920	320		11.9%
1930	330		3.1%
1940	398		20.6%
1950	483		21.4%
1960	601		24.4%
1970	496		−17.5%
1980	604		21.8%
1990	549		−9.1%
2000	325		−40.8%
2010	271		−16.6%
2020	228		−15.9%
2021 (est.)	228	Steady	0.0%
U.S. Decennial Census

=== 2010 census ===
As of the census of 2010, there were 271 people, 114 households, and 72 families living in the town. The population density was 645.2 inhabitants per square mile (249.1/km^{2}). There were 132 housing units at an average density of 314.3 per square mile (121.4/km^{2}). The racial makeup of the town was 94.8% White, 1.5% African American, 1.1% Native American, 1.8% Asian, and 0.7% from two or more races. Hispanic or Latino of any race were 0.4% of the population.

There were 114 households, of which 31.6% had children under the age of 18 living with them, 38.6% were married couples living together, 18.4% had a female householder with no husband present, 6.1% had a male householder with no wife present, and 36.8% were non-families. 33.3% of all households were made up of individuals, and 8.8% had someone living alone who was 65 years of age or older. The average household size was 2.38 and the average family size was 3.00.

The median age in the town was 38.4 years. 24.7% of residents were under the age of 18; 8.5% were between the ages of 18 and 24; 26.5% were from 25 to 44; 25.4% were from 45 to 64; and 14.8% were 65 years of age or older. The gender makeup of the town was 46.5% male and 53.5% female.

=== 2000 census ===
As of the census of 2000, there were 325 people, 134 households, and 95 families living in the town. The population density was 738.5 inhabitants per square mile (285.1/km^{2}). There were 149 housing units at an average density of 338.6 per square mile (130.7/km^{2}). The racial makeup of the town was 97.85% White, 0.31% from other races, and 1.85% from two or more races. Hispanic or Latino of any race were 0.31% of the population.

There were 134 households, out of which 28.4% had children under the age of 18 living with them, 47.0% were married couples living together, 20.1% had a female householder with no husband present, and 28.4% were non-families. 23.9% of all households were made up of individuals, and 11.2% had someone living alone who was 65 years of age or older. The average household size was 2.43 and the average family size was 2.81.

In the town, the population was spread out, with 24.0% under the age of 18, 10.8% from 18 to 24, 25.2% from 25 to 44, 26.2% from 45 to 64, and 13.8% who were 65 years of age or older. The median age was 39 years. For every 100 females, there were 81.6 males. For every 100 females age 18 and over, there were 84.3 males.

The median income for a household in the town was $15,865, and the median income for a family was $23,750. Males had a median income of $31,875 versus $13,750 for females. The per capita income for the town was $10,170. About 24.0% of families and 33.4% of the population were below the poverty line, including 38.2% of those under age 18 and 32.7% of those age 65 or over.

== See also ==
- List of cities and towns along the Ohio River
