= Point Pleasant, West Virginia =

- City
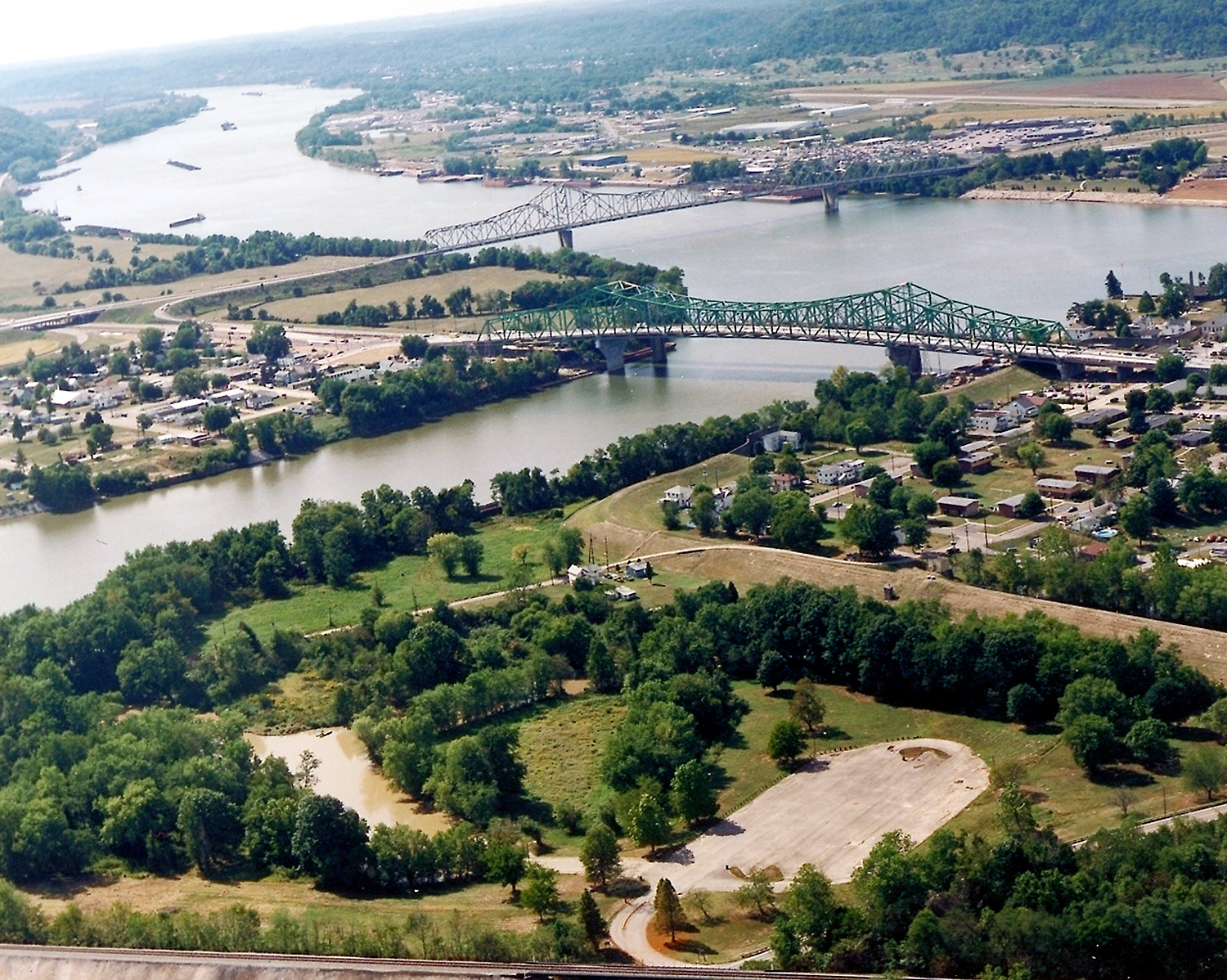
- Point Pleasant (foreground) at the confluence of the Kanawha and Rivers. Gallipolis, Ohio, is in the background right while Henderson, West Virginia, is on the left.

- Flag
- Interactive map of Point Pleasant, West Virginia
- Location within West Virginia Location within the United States
- Coordinates: 38°51′27″N 82°7′43″W
- Country: United States
- State: West Virginia
- County: Mason
- Chartered: 1794
- Incorporated: 1833

Government
  - Mayor: Amber Tatterson

Area
  - Total: 3.10 sq mi (8.02 km^{2})
  - Land: 2.42 sq mi (6.26 km^{2})
  - Water: 0.68 sq mi (1.76 km^{2})
- Elevation: 568 ft (173 m)

Population (2020)
  - Total: 4,070
  - Estimate (2021): 4,031
  - Density: 1,681/sq mi (649.1/km^{2})
- Time zone: UTC-5 (Eastern (EST))
  - Summer (DST): UTC-4 (EDT)
- ZIP code: 25550
- Area code: 304/681
- FIPS code: 54-64708
- GNIS feature ID: 1555381
- Website: visitpointpleasantwv.com

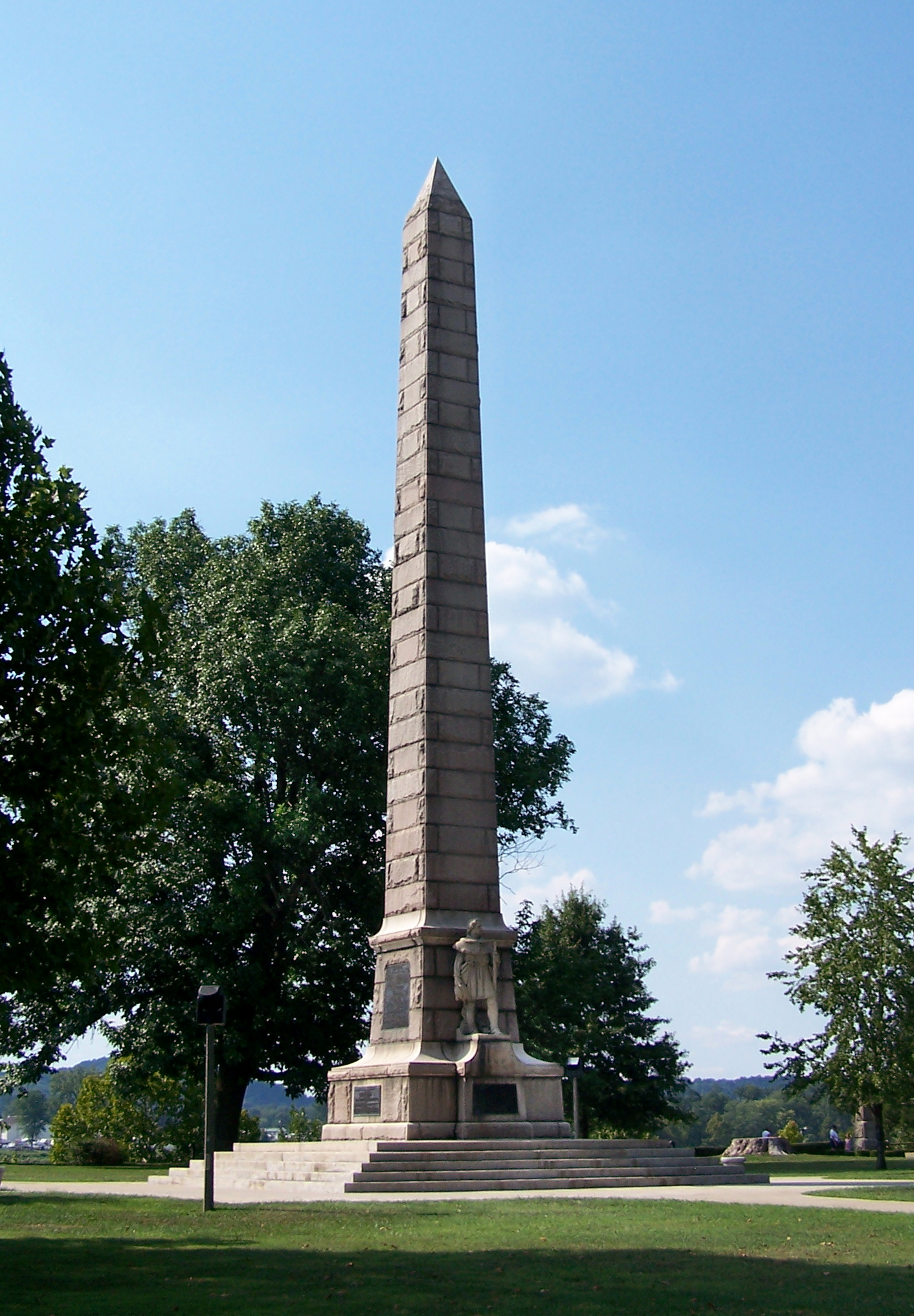
Monument of the Battle of Point Pleasant in Tu-Endie-Wei State Park

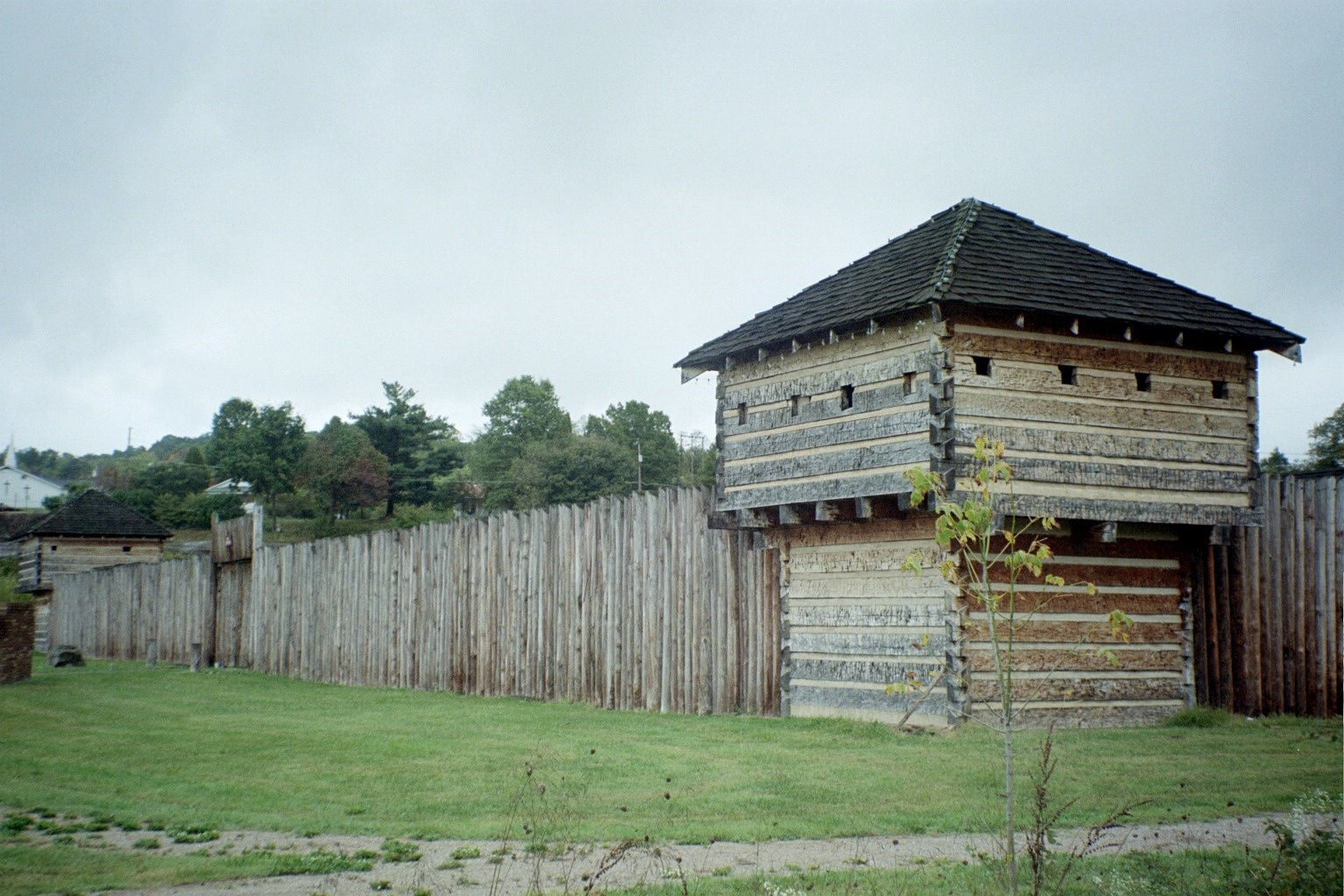
A replica of Fort Randolph, a fort from the American Revolutionary War. The town of Point Pleasant was built on the site of the original fort, and so the rebuilt fort was located nearby.

Point Pleasant is a city in and the county seat of Mason County, West Virginia, United States, at the confluence of the Ohio and Kanawha Rivers. The population was 4,101 at the 2020 census. It is the principal city of the Point Pleasant micropolitan area extending into Ohio. The town is best known for the Mothman, a purported humanoid creature reportedly sighted in the area that has become a part of West Virginia folklore, and more broadly part of American popular culture.

== History ==
A Shawnee village known as Upper Shawneetown was established in this area before 1749, which the Shawnees called "Chinoudaista" or "Chinodahichetha".

=== The Céloron Expedition (1749) ===
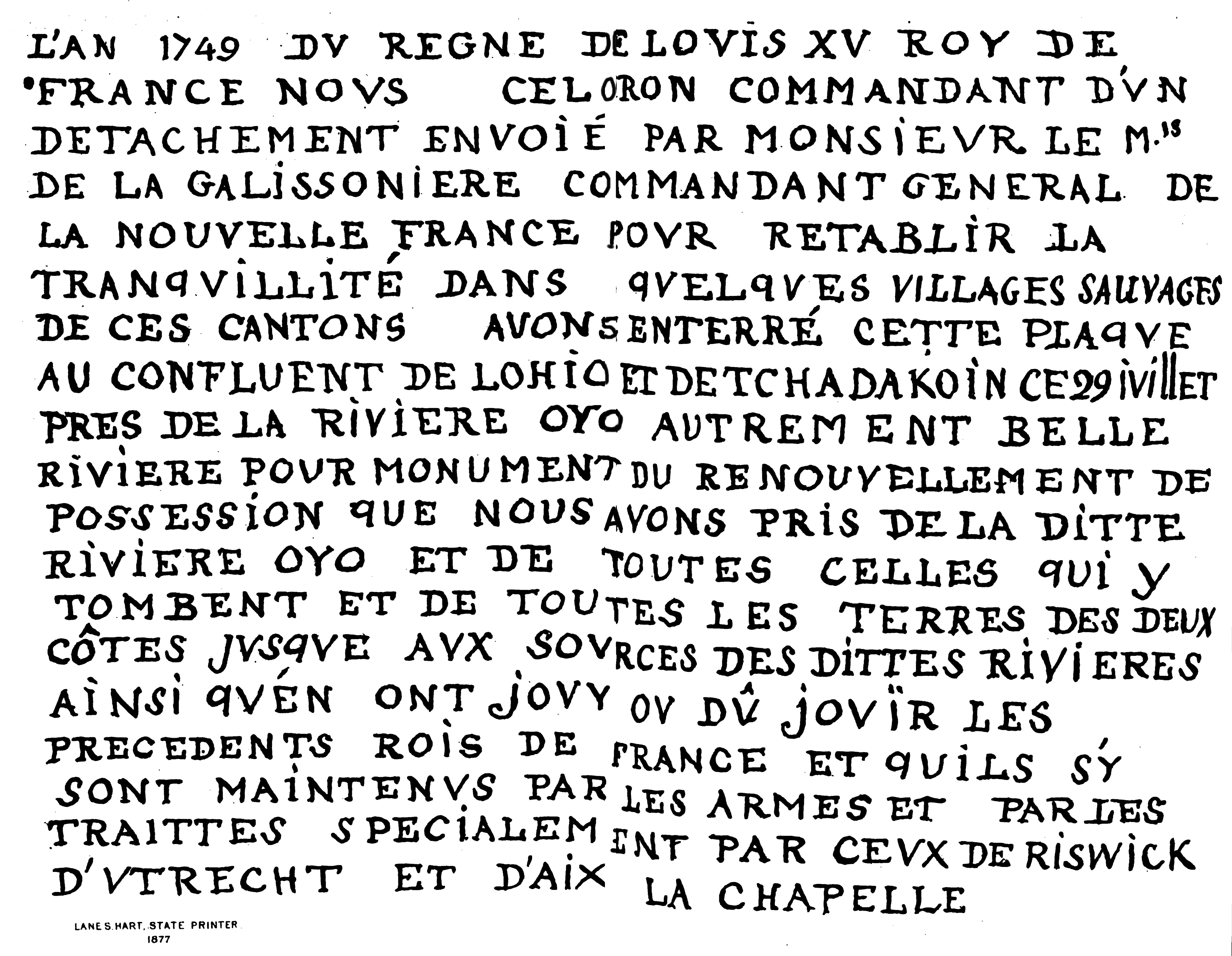
In 1749 French explorer Pierre Joseph Céloron de Blainville asserts sovereignty of France over the Ohio valley by burying a lead plaque called « of Point Pleasant ».

In the second half of 1749, the French explorer Pierre Joseph Céloron de Blainville (1693–1759) claimed French sovereignty over the Ohio Valley, burying a lead plaque at the meeting point of the Ohio and Kanawha Rivers.

The text on the plaque is as follows:

L'AN 1749 DV REGNE DE LOVIS XV ROY DE FRANCE, NOVS CELORON, COMMANDANT D'VN DETACHEMENT ENVOIE PAR MONSIEVR LE MIS. DE LA GALISSONIERE, COMMANDANT GENERAL DE LA NOUVELLE FRANCE POVR RETABLIR LA TRAN QUILLITE DANS QUELQUES VILLAGES SAUVAGES DE CES CANTONS, AVONS ENTERRE CETTE PLAQUE AU CONFLUENT DE L'OHIO ET DE TCHADAKOIN CE 29 JVILLET, PRES DE LA RIVIERE OYO AUTREMENT BELLE RIVIERE, POUR MONUMENT DU RENOUVELLEMENT DE POSSESSION QUE NOUS AVONS PRIS DE LA DITTE RIVIERE OYO, ET DE TOUTES CELLE~ QUI Y TOMBENT, ET DE TOUTES LES TERRES DES DEUX COTES JVSQVE AVX SOURCES DES DITTES RIVIERES AINSI QV'EN ONT JOVY OU DV JOVIR LES PRECEDENTS ROIS DE FRANCE, ET QU'ILS S'Y SONT MAINTENVS PAR LES ARMES ET PAR LES TRAIT TES, SPECIALEMENT PAR CEVX DE RISWICK D'VTRECHT ET D'AIX LA CHAPELLE.

(In the year 1749, in the reign of King Louis XV, we, Celoron, commander of a detachment sent by Commander de La Galissonière, Commander General of New France, for the restoration of peace in various untamed villages in the region, have buried this plaque at the confluence of the Ohio and Tchadakoin [Rivers] this 29th day of July near the fine river bank, to commemorate the retaking into possession of the afore-mentioned river bank and all the surrounding lands on both river shores back to the river sources, as secured by previous kings of France, and maintained by force of arms and by treaties, specifically the Treaties of Rijswick, of Utrecht and of Aix la Chapelle)

Céloron's expedition was a diplomatic failure since the local tribes remained pro-British, and British representatives refused to leave. This incident was the prelude to conflicts between the French and British in North America that would lead to the outbreak of the French and Indian War in 1754 (as part of the Seven Years' War) that would lead to the cessation of New France to the British and the ultimate expulsion of France from most of its possessions in North America.

The expedition can nevertheless be seen in more positive terms as a geographical project since the Céloron expedition was the starting point for the first map of the Ohio Valley, which was the work of the Jesuit Joseph Pierre de Bonnecamps.

In 1770, Colonel George Washington visited the confluence that would become Point Pleasant, then proceeded 14 miles up the "Great Kanawha" and later reported that "This Country abounds in Buffalo and Wild game of all kinds as also in all kinds of wild fowl, there being in the Bottoms a great many small grassy Ponds or Lakes which are full of Swans, Geese, and Ducks of different kinds."

=== The Battle of Point Pleasant (1774) ===
In the Battle of Point Pleasant (October 10, 1774), fought on the future site of the town, over one thousand Virginia militiamen, led by Colonel Andrew Lewis (1720–1781), defeated a roughly equal force of an Algonquin confederation of Shawnee and Mingo warriors led by Shawnee Chief Cornstalk (c. 1720–1777). The event is celebrated locally as the "First Battle of the American Revolutionary War", and in 1908, the U.S. Senate authorized the erection of a local monument to commemorate it as such. Most historians, however, regard it not as a battle of the Revolution (1775–1783) but as a part of Lord Dunmore's War (1774).

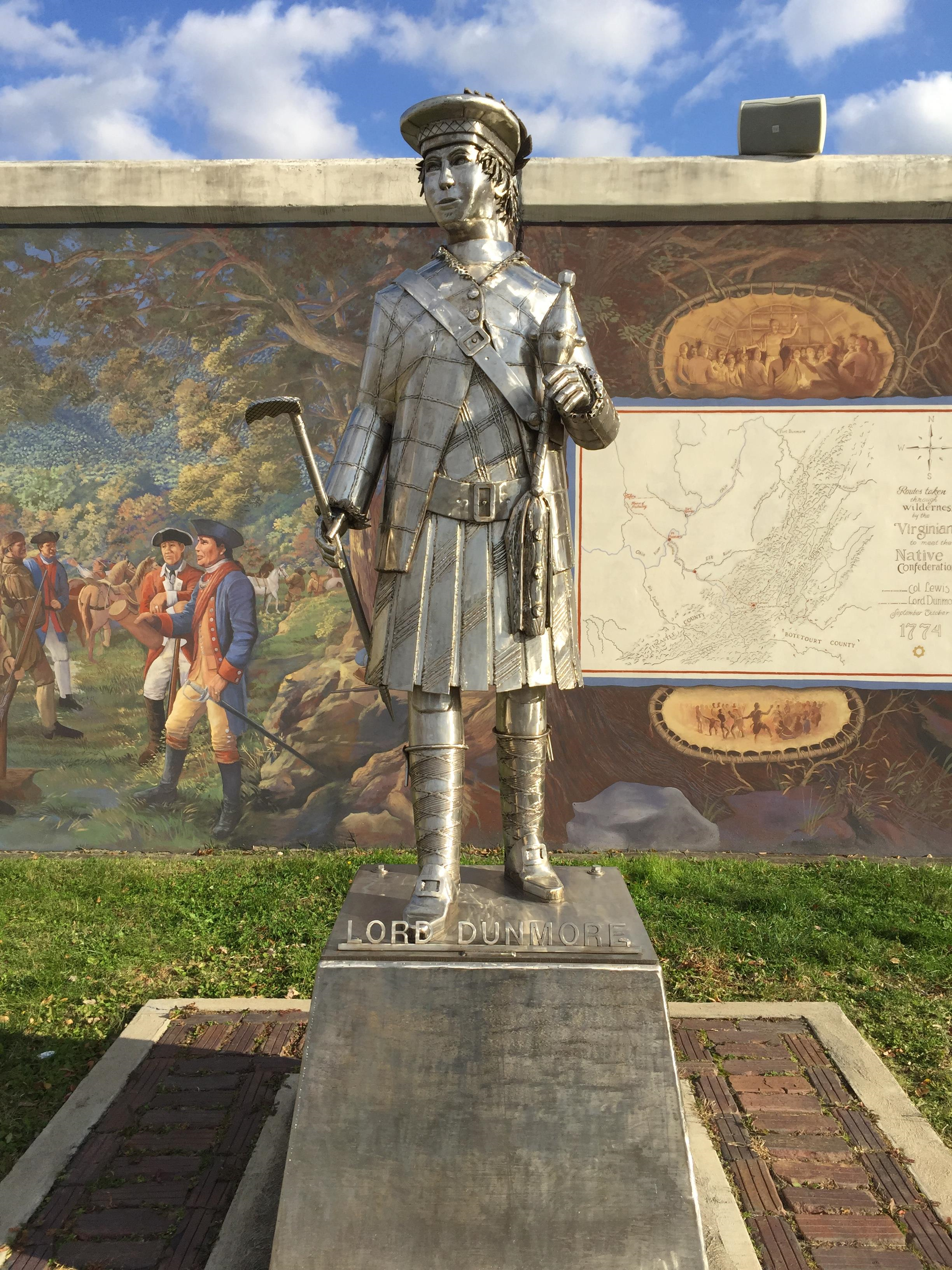
Statue of Lord Dunmore at Point Pleasant, in front of the flood wall mural

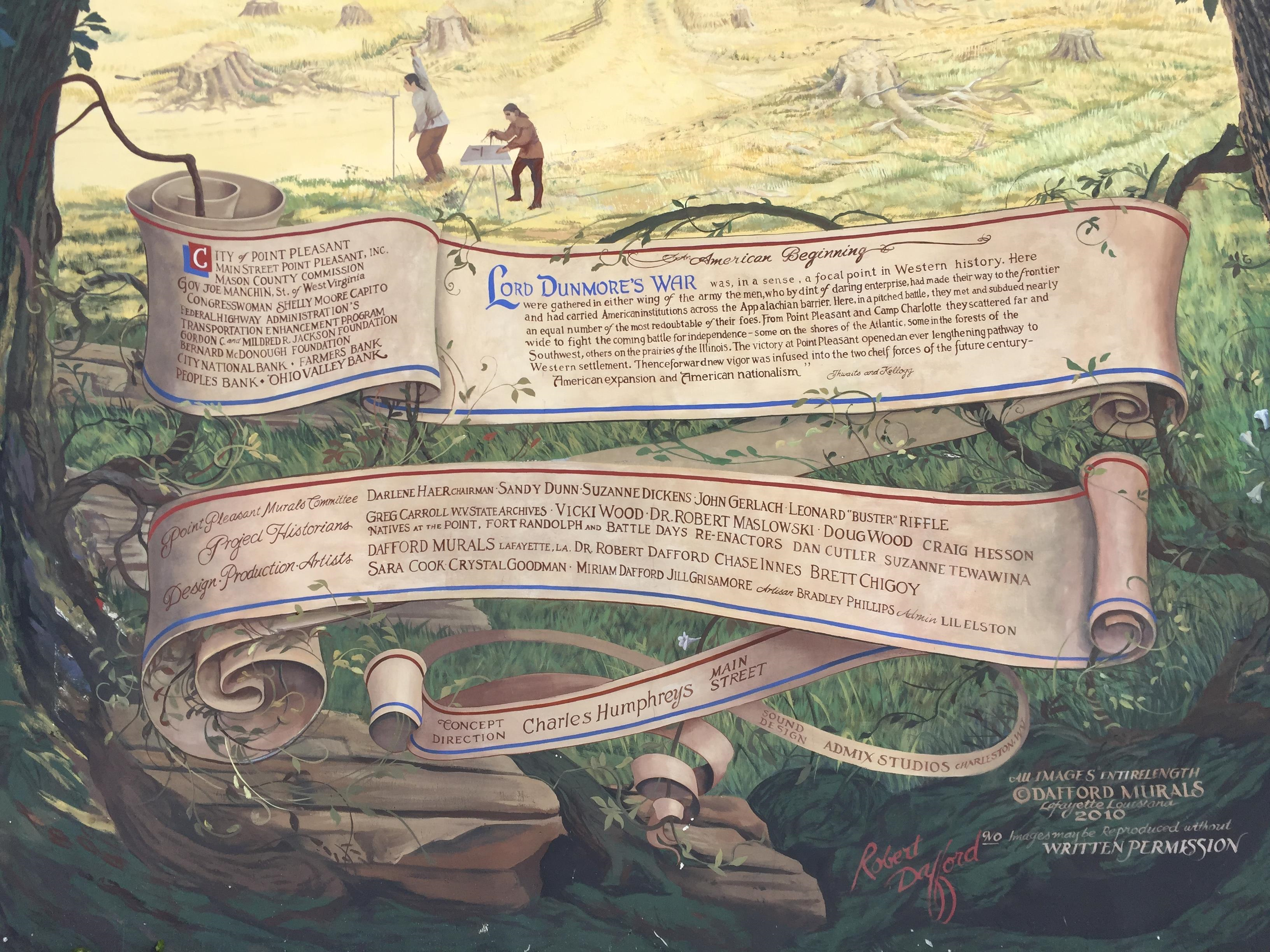
Mural with a quotation from Documentary History of Dunmore's War, 1774, edited by Reuben Thwaites (here misspelled "Thwaits") and Louise Kellogg

=== Settlement ===
"Camp Point Pleasant" was established by Col. Lewis at the time of the Battle, and the settlement that followed also took that name. Although not certain, Point Pleasant may have been permanently settled by whites as early as 1774. At about that time, a permanent stockade known as Fort Blair was erected there. Before that, hostilities between whites and Native Americans all along the Ohio River Valley probably precluded the possibility of settlement in the absence of a substantial stockade. In 1776, a new fort was built on the site of the earlier fort and named for the recently deceased Virginia official Peyton Randolph (1721–1775). Fort Randolph is best remembered as the place where Chief Cornstalk was murdered in 1777. It withstood an attack by Native Americans the following year but was abandoned in 1779.

George Washington's 1770 journey to the Ohio River Valley had been occasioned by military grants that had been awarded by proclamation in 1754 by Governor Dinwiddie to officers and soldiers who had served in the French and Indian War. The resulting survey encompassed 52,302 acres (or 80 square miles). It was subdivided in the 1780s as follows: 9,876 acres – including the present side of Point Pleasant – to Andrew Lewis, 5,000 acres for George Muse, 5,000 acres for Peter Hogg, 8,000 acres for Andrew Stephens, another 3,000 acres for Peter Hogg, another 5,026 acres for George Muse, 3,400 acres for Andrew Waggener, 6,000 acres for John Poulson, 6,000 acres for John West. On the lower side of the Kanawha River, 13,532 acres for Hugh Mercer (see Mercers Bottom) and, finally, 10,990 acres for Washington himself.

Fort Randolph was rebuilt nearby in 1785 after the renewal of hostilities between the United States government and Native Americans, but it saw little action and was eventually abandoned once again. The settlement at Point Pleasant did not receive an official charter until 1794.

=== 19th century ===
Mason County was carved out of Kanawha County in 1804, and Point Pleasant was designated the county seat then. According to historian Virgil A. Lewis, "Point Pleasant did not flourish for many years [after the turn of the century]. There was no church for over fifty years, and society was low. There was a popular superstition that because of the fiendish murder of Cornstalk there in 1777, the place was laid under a curse for a hundred years". Lewis also relates that a visitor to Point Pleasant in 1810 observed that ...

Point Pleasant is pleasantly situated immediately above the mouth of the Great Kanawha, on an extensive and fertile bottom of the Ohio, of which it has a fine prospect up and down that river. It is the seat of justice of Mason county Virginia, and contains about 15 or 20 families, a log courthouse, a log jail and as usual (but unfortunately) in the Virginia towns, a pillory and whipping post. Point Pleasant seems rather on the stand in point of improvement, arising, it is said, from the difficulty in establishing the land titles. It is, however, a considerable place of embarkation for those descending the Ohio from the back and western parts of Virginia. There is one merchant. Mr. William Langtry.

Point Pleasant was incorporated in 1833.

During the American Civil War, the Virginia Secession Convention of 1861, Mason County's delegate, lawyer James H. Couch (1821–1899), although an enslaver, voted against declaring secession. Mason County then sent no delegates to the Virginia House of Delegates until West Virginia's statehood, which Virginia's House of Delegates refused to recognize, thus seating James Hutcheson, who Confederate soldiers had elected in their camp. Meanwhile, William W. Newman claimed to represent Mason and nearby Jackson, Cabell, Wayne, and Wirt counties throughout the war. Mason County sent more than 1000 men to the Union army and one company of 61 men to the Confederate Army (the 37th Virginia Infantry). In March 1863, in the only wartime skirmish in Point Pleasant, during the Jones-Imboden Raid, the 6th Virginia Cavalry and 8th Virginia Cavalry attacked the Mason County Courthouse, where they believed munitions stored, leaving bullet holes in the walls until a replacement was built in 1954.

=== 20th century ===
Point Pleasant was widely noted for the 1967 collapse of the Silver Bridge, which killed 46 people.

On October 10, 1974, Point Pleasant celebrated the 200th anniversary of the Battle of Point Pleasant. A replica of Fort Randolph was built in 1973–74 and dedicated as part of the festivities. The town of Point Pleasant was situated over the site of the fort and so the replica is located at Krodel Park, about one mile away.

=== National Register of Historic Places ===
The Eastham House, Lewis-Capehart-Roseberry House, and Point Pleasant Battleground are listed on the National Register of Historic Places. The central business district and surrounding residential areas are included in the Point Pleasant Historic District.

== Geography ==
According to the United States Census Bureau, the city has a total area of 3.10 square miles (8.03 km^{2}), of which 2.40 square miles (6.22 km^{2}) is land and 0.70 square miles (1.81 km^{2}) is water.

Point Pleasant is located at 38°51′27″N 82°7′43″W (38.857527, -82.128571).

Point Pleasant is home to Tu-Endie-Wei State Park and Krodel Park.

=== Climate ===
The climate in this area is characterized by evenly distributed precipitation throughout the year. According to the Köppen Climate Classification system, Point Pleasant has a humid subtropical climate, abbreviated "Cfa" on climate maps.

Climate data for Point Pleasant, West Virginia
Month	Jan	Feb	Mar	Apr	May	Jun	Jul	Aug	Sep	Oct	Nov	Dec	Year
Mean daily maximum °F (°C)	45 (7)	46 (8)	58 (14)	69 (21)	78 (26)	86 (30)	89 (32)	88 (31)	83 (28)	71 (22)	57 (14)	46 (8)	68 (20)
Mean daily minimum °F (°C)	25 (−4)	25 (−4)	33 (1)	42 (6)	51 (11)	60 (16)	64 (18)	63 (17)	56 (13)	44 (7)	34 (1)	27 (−3)	44 (7)
Average precipitation inches (mm)	3.7 (94)	3.2 (81)	4.1 (100)	3.5 (89)	4 (100)	4.3 (110)	4.5 (110)	3.6 (91)	2.5 (64)	2.5 (64)	3 (76)	3.4 (86)	42.4 (1,080)
Source: Weatherbase

== Demographics ==
Historical population
Census	Pop.	Note	%±
1870	773		—
1880	1,036		34.0%
1890	1,853		78.9%
1900	1,934		4.4%
1910	2,045		5.7%
1920	3,059		49.6%
1930	3,301		7.9%
1940	3,538		7.2%
1950	4,596		29.9%
1960	5,785		25.9%
1970	6,122		5.8%
1980	5,682		−7.2%
1990	4,996		−12.1%
2000	4,637		−7.2%
2010	4,350		−6.2%
2020	4,070		−6.4%
2021 (est.)	4,031		−1.0%
U.S. Decennial Census

=== 2020 census ===
As of the 2020 census, Point Pleasant had a population of 4,070. The median age was 44.2 years. 21.5% of residents were under the age of 18 and 24.4% of residents were 65 years of age or older. For every 100 females there were 83.7 males, and for every 100 females age 18 and over there were 76.3 males age 18 and over.

99.5% of residents lived in urban areas, while 0.5% lived in rural areas.

There were 1,912 households in Point Pleasant, of which 26.4% had children under the age of 18 living in them. Of all households, 33.6% were married-couple households, 18.3% were households with a male householder and no spouse or partner present, and 42.3% were households with a female householder and no spouse or partner present. About 41.4% of all households were made up of individuals and 22.5% had someone living alone who was 65 years of age or older.

There were 2,207 housing units, of which 13.4% were vacant. The homeowner vacancy rate was 3.3% and the rental vacancy rate was 9.4%.

Racial composition as of the 2020 census
Race	Number	Percent
White	3,837	94.3%
Black or African American	54	1.3%
American Indian and Alaska Native	9	0.2%
Asian	29	0.7%
Native Hawaiian and Other Pacific Islander	1	0.0%
Some other race	3	0.1%
Two or more races	137	3.4%
Hispanic or Latino (of any race)	28	0.7%

=== 2010 census ===
As of the census of 2010, there were 4,350 people, 2,014 households, and 1,162 families residing in the city. The population density was 1,812.5 inhabitants per square mile (699.8/km^{2}). There were 2,244 housing units at an average density of 935.0 per square mile (361.0/km^{2}). The racial makeup of the city was 95.9% White, 1.3% African American, 0.3% Native American, 0.6% Asian, 0.3% Pacific Islander, and 1.7% from two or more races. Hispanic or Latino of any race were 0.6% of the population.

There were 2,014 households, of which 25.7% had children under the age of 18 living with them, 37.9% were married couples living together, 16.0% had a female householder with no husband present, 3.8% had a male householder with no wife present, and 42.3% were non-families. 38.5% of all households were made up of individuals, and 18.7% had someone living alone who was 65 years of age or older. The average household size was 2.15 and the average family size was 2.82.

The median age in the city was 44 years. 21.5% of residents were under the age of 18; 7.8% were between the ages of 18 and 24; 21.6% were from 25 to 44; 27.4% were from 45 to 64; and 21.6% were 65 years of age or older. The gender makeup of the city was 44.9% male and 55.1% female.

=== 2000 census ===
As of the census of 2000, there were 4,637 people, 2,107 households, and 1,310 families residing in the city. The population density was 1,945.6 inhabitants per square mile (751.2/km^{2}). There were 2,313 housing units at an average density of 970.5 per square mile (374.7/km^{2}). The racial makeup of the city was 96.57% White, 1.90% African American, 0.15% Native American, 0.60% Asian, 0.09% from other races, and 0.69% from two or more races. Hispanic or Latino of any race were 0.54% of the population.

There were 2,107 households, out of which 26.3% had children under the age of 18 living with them, 44.7% were married couples living together, 14.4% had a female householder with no husband present, and 37.8% were non-families. 34.8% of all households were made up of individuals, and 17.8% had someone living alone who was 65 years of age or older. The average household size was 2.18 and the average family size was 2.80.

In the city, the population was spread out, with 21.3% under the age of 18, 8.4% from 18 to 24, 23.7% from 25 to 44, 26.2% from 45 to 64, and 20.4% who were 65 years of age or older. The median age was 43 years. For every 100 females, there were 83.6 males. For every 100 females age 18 and over, there were 75.3 males.

The median income for a household in the city was $27,022, and the median income for a family was $33,527. Males had a median income of $31,657 versus $16,607 for females. The per capita income for the city was $16,692. About 22.2% of families and 24.2% of the population were below the poverty line, including 37.9% of those under age 18 and 13.3% of those age 65 or over.

== Folklore ==
=== Mothman ===
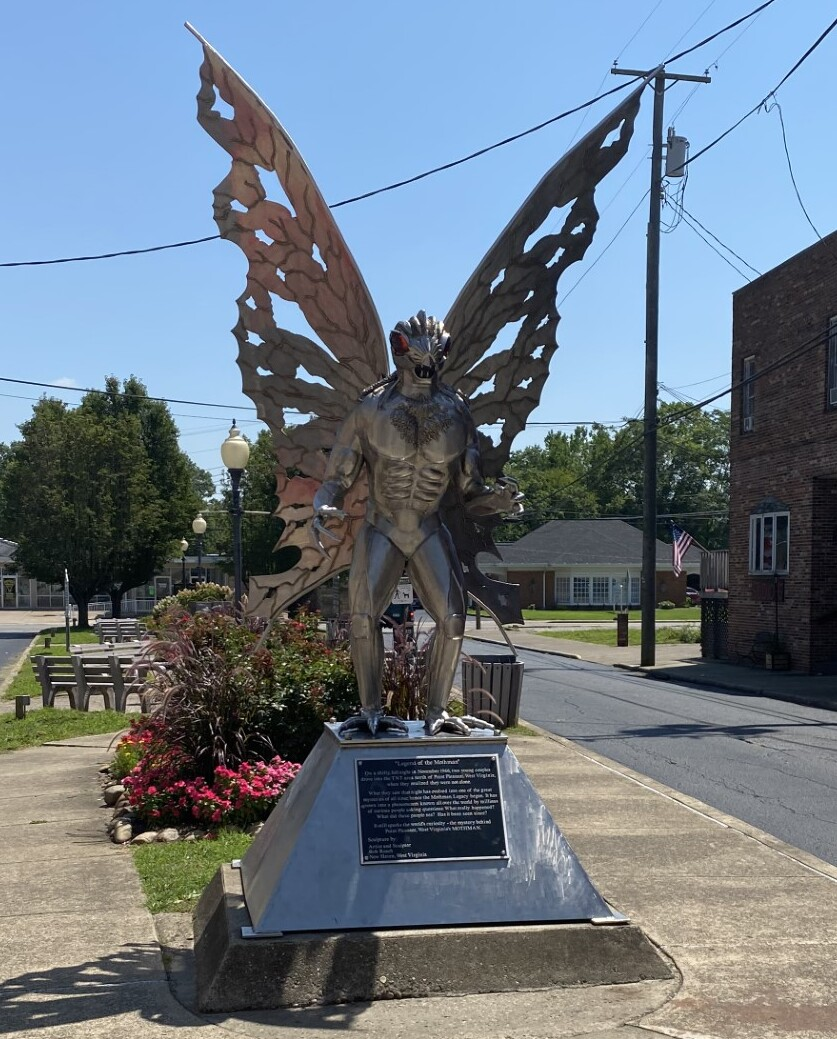
Statue of the Mothman, a legendary creature said to inhabit Point Pleasant

Paranormal enthusiasts flock to Point Pleasant in search of Mothman, a creature said to be a harbinger of imminent disaster that inhabits an abandoned TNT factory from World War II. John Keel published a book in 1975 entitled The Mothman Prophecies, and a film inspired by the novel was released in January 2002. Later, another film, loosely based on the legend, was also released. The town is host to a Mothman Museum, and every year, it holds a Mothman Festival that features tours, pageants, balls, films, music, and other events to celebrate what they consider "one of Point Pleasant's largest tourist attractions". A 12-foot-tall metallic statue of the creature stands in Point Pleasant.

=== Sheepsquatch (The White Thing) ===
The Sheepsquatch or the "White Thing" is a legendary cryptid rumored to inhabit Point Pleasant. According to local folklore, during the 1990s, women driving through the TNT area saw a creature described as being seven to eight feet tall covered in shaggy white hair with legs like a man, a face like a sheep, and horns like a ram's. Other stories include a miner who said they saw a big white grey thing, unnamed motorists who reported an animal with a long face that looked to be covered in rags, and a hunter who claimed to see an animal with horns and human hands.

== Notable people ==
- Among the early settlers at Point Pleasant was Samuel B. Clemens and his wife Pamela (née Goggin), grandparents of the celebrated author Mark Twain. They had migrated from Campbell County, Virginia, and, according to family tradition, Samuel was killed in 1805 by a falling log at a house raising there.
- Point Pleasant was the final home of Confederate Brigadier-General John McCausland, the next-to-last Confederate General to die. He died at his farm at Grimm's Landing on January 23, 1927, and is buried in nearby Henderson.
- Karl Probst, born in Point Pleasant, was an automotive engineer credited in 1940 with the design of the Jeep.
- The Shawnee Chief Cornstalk was taken prisoner and later killed by a mob at Fort Randolph on November 10, 1777.
- Lee Anna Starr (1853–1937), Methodist minister and suffragist, was born in Point Pleasant
- Ray Stevens, pro wrestler and 2021 WWE Hall of Fame inductee

== See also ==
- List of cities and towns along the Ohio River
