= Clendenin District, Mason County, West Virginia =

- Magisterial district
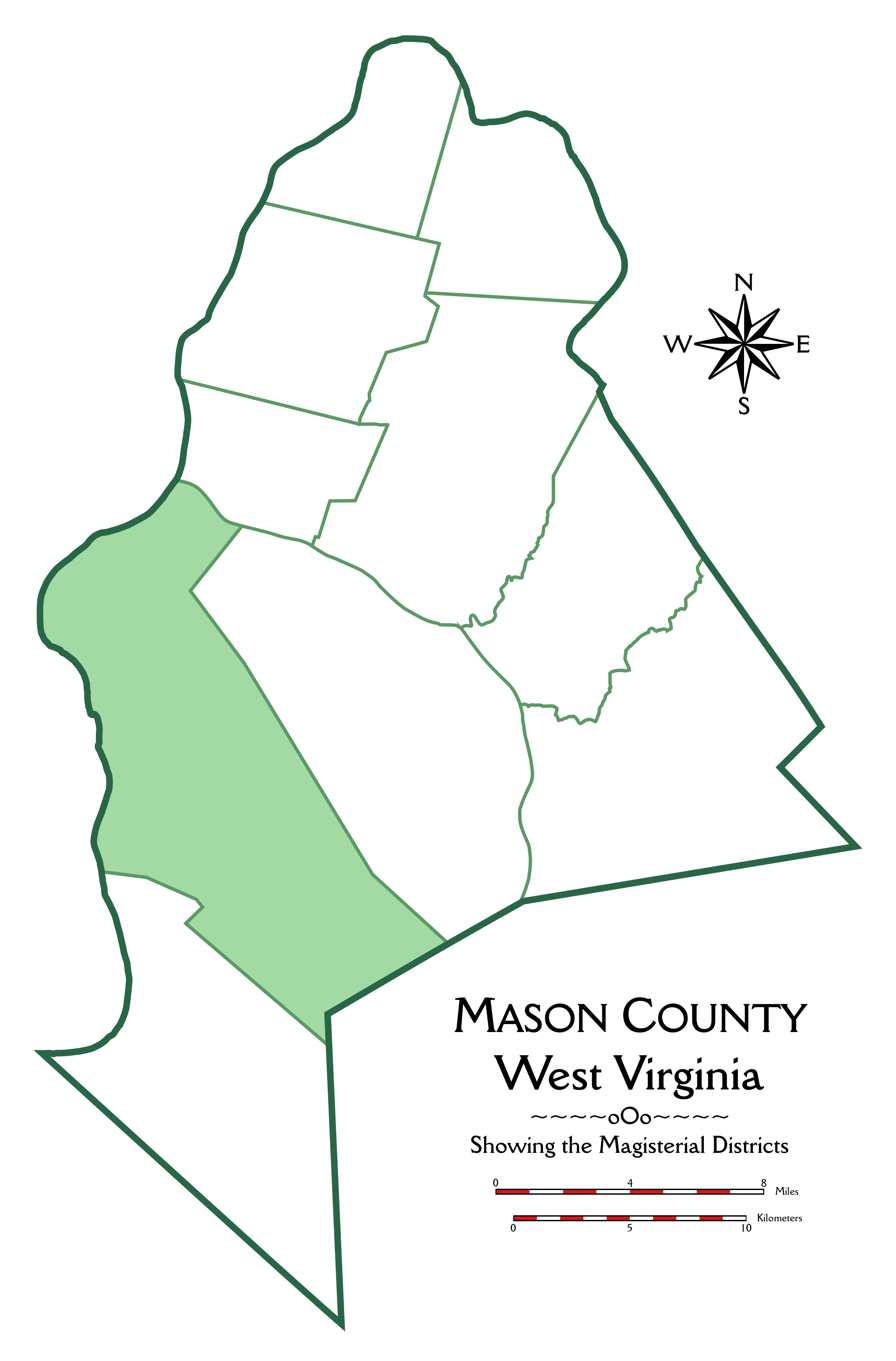
- Location of Clendenin District in Mason County
- Coordinates: 38°42′47″N 82°07′25″W
- Country: United States
- State: West Virginia
- County: Mason
- Established: 1863
- Named after: William Clendenin

Area
  - Total: 83.34 sq mi (215.8 km^{2})
  - Land: 79.88 sq mi (206.9 km^{2})
  - Water: 3.47 sq mi (9.0 km^{2})
- Elevation: 876 ft (267 m)

Population (2020)
  - Total: 3,435
  - Density: 45/sq mi (17/km^{2})
- Time zone: UTC-5 (Eastern (EST))
  - Summer (DST): UTC-4 (EDT)
- GNIS feature ID: 1928195

Clendenin Magisterial District is one of ten magisterial districts in Mason County, West Virginia, United States. The district was originally established as a civil township in 1863, and converted into a magisterial district in 1872. In 2020, Clendenin District was home to 3,435 people.

== Geography ==
Clendenin District is located along the Ohio River in the southern part of Mason County. To the north, it is bounded by the Ohio and Kanawha Rivers, and by Lewis District; to the northeast, by Arbuckle District; to the southeast by Buffalo-Union District in Putnam County, formerly Buffalo District; to the south by Hannan District, in Mason County; and to the west by the Ohio River. Across the river are Gallipolis and Clay Townships, in Gallia County, Ohio, and the village of Gallipolis.

Clendenin District includes submerged land in the Ohio River to the low water mark on the Ohio shore, originally reserved by the state of Virginia, when it ceded its claim to the Northwest Territory in 1784. As a result, the district includes Gallipolis Island, a quarter-mile long island barely two hundred feet from the Gallipolis shore. The district also includes the Robert C. Byrd Locks and Dam, on the Ohio River just above Apple Grove. Excluded from Clendenin District is Raccoon Island, a former island, now a shoal in the Ohio River opposite the mouth of Crab Creek; at low water, Raccoon Island was connected to the mainland, so it belongs to Clay Township in Gallia County.

With an area greater than eighty-three square miles, Clendenin is the largest of Mason County's ten magisterial districts. It is one of three districts south of the Kanawha River, together with Arbuckle and Hannan; these are three of the four largest and most rural districts in Mason County. The soil in the Ohio River bottoms of the western part of the district feature a productive mixture of sand and clay. The soil in the hills making up the majority of the district contains red and white clay, mixed with black loam.

=== Streams ===
The main streams of Clendenin District are Salt Creek, Twomile Creek, Crab Creek, Flatfoot Creek, Sixteenmile Creek, and Eighteenmile Creek, all of which empty into the Ohio River, and Arbuckle Creek, which flows into the Kanawha above Henderson. Of these, Twomile and Sixteenmile are sometimes referred to as the Ohio Twomile and Sixteenmile, to distinguish them from the Kanawha Twomile and Sixteenmile Creeks, which flow into the Kanawha River from Arbuckle District. There was once a Kanawha Eighteenmile in Mason County, but since 1848 it has been part of Putnam County; its mouth forms part of the boundary between Putnam County and Union District in Mason County.

Crab Creek is the largest stream lying entirely in Clendenin District. Its middle fork begins in the hills three miles east of Gallipolis Ferry, near the northwest corner of Arbuckle District. It flows south and west for about three miles, until it meets its Right-hand Fork, which flows westward from the hills east of Fay, taking in Horse Lick coming from the north below Mohrtown. Crab Creek then flows westward out of the hills, meeting the Sand Fork at the base of the hills. The Sand Fork of Crab Creek flows south and west out of the hills a mile east of Gallipolis Ferry, reaching the river bottom at Beale, then meandering through the floodplain south and east for a mile and a half before joining the main branch. Crab Creek then flows along the base of the hills for a mile and a half before abruptly turning northwest, and meeting Mud Run, flowing out of the hills behind Ben Lomond, a mile to the south. The combined stream then meanders through the bottomland before discharging into the Ohio, just above the mouth of Raccoon Creek on the opposite shore.

Flatfoot Creek flows southeast out of the hills behind Hogsett, reaching the floodplain above Apple Grove, then running along the base of the hills north to Hogsett. Here the creek historically turned southward, and gradually meandered toward the Ohio, which it joined at the boundary of Clendenin and Hannan Districts. In the 1990s, part of the western portion of the floodplain along the Robert C. Byrd Locks and Dam was removed and flooded to build two auxiliary locks, and Flatfoot Creek diverted to empty into the Ohio at Hogsett. The original lower course of the creek was used to create a series of ponds below the locks.

The Ohio Sixteenmile drains much of the southern part of the district. Its upper waters are in western Arbuckle District, along with its tributaries, the Wolfpen Branch and the Willow Branch, which join the main branch southeast of Arlee, along the district boundary. Sixteenmile curves around the base of Loggerhead Ridge, meeting the Loggerhead Fork, and flows south for about three miles past Potts Hollow and Potts Chapel Ridge, and meets the Righthand Fork flowing west from the hills near Sevenmile Ridge. From here, Sixteenmile flows west, meeting with Millstone Creek flowing from the north, and then turning southwest, meeting with Daves Run, and crossing into Hannan District. The creek makes a dogleg turn to the southeast, and briefly crosses back into Clendenin District, where it meets Jerrys Run, flowing westward, then continues southwest through Hannan District to the river. As it exits the hills, Sixteenmile is joined by Stonecoal Run, the upper waters of which are in Clendenin District.

The main branch of Eighteenmile Creek only flows for a short distance through the southernmost part of Clendenin District, as it travels from western Putnam County to the Ohio River below Ashton in Hannan District. However, several of its tributaries flow out of Clendenin District, including the Spring Branch of Whitepine Creek, which joins Eighteenmile at the Putnam County line; Road Fork, all of which lies in Clendenin District; and the upper waters of Mud Run and the Hughes Branch of Eighteenmile.

Other streams of Clendenin District include a Willow Branch that flows into the Ohio below Henderson; Mile Creek, which flows into the Ohio between Willow Branch and Salt Creek; Ohio Threemile, which enters the river opposite Gallipolis Island; Ferry Creek, of which several branches flow from the hills northeast of Gallipolis Ferry, and which joins the Ohio just above the old ferry landing; and the upper waters of the Kanawha Sixteenmile, or Big Sixteen, including its Fivefork Branch, drain the southeastern part of the district, before flowing into Arbuckle District.

=== Communities ===
Henderson is the only incorporated town in Clendenin District. It was first laid out by Frank Sisson in 1879, on land that had belonged to Samuel B. Henderson, one of the district's earliest settlers. Within a few years, it had its own post office, a general store, and about a dozen houses. The town developed around the intersection of two roads, one following the Ohio River northward to Point Pleasant, and one following the southern bank of the Kanawha. There was a ferry landing to carry passengers between Henderson, Point Pleasant, and Kanauga, a village in Gallia County opposite Point Pleasant. Since 1931, Henderson has stood at the southern end of a north–south bridge carrying traffic to Point Pleasant, and since 1969, the Silver Memorial Bridge, just south of the village, has carried passengers across the Ohio to Kanauga and Gallipolis. U.S. Route 35 formerly passed through the center of Henderson, but it has since been diverted into the hills south of the Kanawha, and connects directly with the Silver Memorial Bridge.

Although there are no other towns, Clendenin District includes a number of unincorporated communities. The village of Gallipolis Ferry sits at the base of the hills in the westernmost part of the district. From here, a ferry once carried passengers across the Ohio to the city of Gallipolis. More recently, the village has been the site of a chemical plant, formerly owned by Dutch paint and chemical manufacturer AkzoNobel. The village of Beale, site of a post office from 1902 to 1916, as well as Beale School, has largely disappeared into Gallipolis Ferry.

Redmond is a small village in the northern hills of the district, on Redmond Ridge between the upper waters of Salt Creek and the boundary with Arbuckle District. It was the site of a post office from 1886 to 1913, (Note: Officially "Redmud" until 1902.) when the mail was redirected to Henderson. Further south along Redmond Ridge is the village of Wyoma, above the upper waters of Crab Creek, flowing southwest to the Ohio, and Upper Fivemile Creek, flowing northeast toward the Kanawha in Arbuckle District. Wyoma was the site of a post office from 1884 to 1916.

The former villages of Caddie and Fay lay on the upper waters of the Righthand Fork of Crab Creek. Both received post offices in 1903; Caddie's was discontinued in 1913, and Fay's in 1916. Later, Mohrtown was located on a different branch of the Righthand Fork. Ben Lomond sits at the base of the hills at a narrow point in the river bottom, where Mud Run turns northward on its way to join Crab Creek. About a mile south of Ben Lomond is Hogsett, near the mouth of Flatfoot Creek. The village was named for Charles W. Hogsett, its first postmaster, in 1885. Ben Lomond received its post office in 1886, and for a while the U.S. Post Office Department wavered between which village should keep one. Ben Lomond's post office closed permanently in 1919, while Hogsett's remained until 1967.

Arlee and Pondlick are villages on the upper waters of Ohio Sixteenmile Creek. Arlee had a post office from 1890 to 1955; Pondlick from 1900 to 1919.

Apple Grove, West Virginia is a village on the broad river bottom in the southern part of Clendenin District, and it straddles the boundary between Clendenin and Hannan Districts. The village received its first postmaster in 1872, and is home to a sizable chemical plant, formerly owned by the Goodyear Tire and Rubber Company.

=== Roads and transportation ===
There are two highways in Clendenin District: West Virginia Route 2, known locally as "Huntington Road", runs along the Ohio River from Huntington to Point Pleasant, crossing the Kanawha River at Henderson. U.S. Route 35 follows the Kanawha River from Teays Valley to Henderson, where it crosses the Ohio into Gallia County, continuing northwest to Chillicothe.

Other important routes include Crab Creek Road, County Route 29, and Redmond Ridge Road, County Route 25. Crab Creek Road follows the Righthand Fork of Crab Creek, and continues into the hills to Arlee, on the eastern side of the district. Crab Creek Road then enters Arbuckle District, where it travels around and through the Chief Cornstalk Wildlife Management Area on its way to Southside, in the Kanawha Valley, following the course of Little Sixteenmile Creek during its descent out of the hills. Redmond Ridge Road follows the course of Redmond Ridge south to Wyoma; from there it continues southeast to Lower Fivemile Road, which runs northeast along Lower Fivemile Creek in Arbuckle District, and southwest as County Route 25 until it joins Crab Creek Road. A more direct route, Horse Lick Road, County Route 29/6, follows a minor tributary of Crab Creek from Wyoma south to Crab Creek Road.

A Baltimore and Ohio Railroad Line, now part of CSX, runs along the Ohio River between Huntington and Point Pleasant, crossing the river on a railroad bridge at Henderson, and continuing north along the river to Parkersburg. Until the twentieth century, there were ferries across the Ohio and Kanawha Rivers at Henderson, and a ferry on the Ohio at Gallipolis Ferry. The Robert C. Byrd Locks and Dam make the Ohio River navigable for barge and other water traffic between the Racine Locks and Dam at the upper end of the county, and the Greenup Lock and Dam in Kentucky, a stretch of one hundred and three miles.

== History ==
Historical population
Census	Pop.	Note	%±
1870	1,657		—
1880	2,741		65.4%
1890	3,124		14.0%
1900	4,049		29.6%
1910	3,841		−5.1%
1920	3,187		−17.0%
1930	2,935		−7.9%
1940	3,251		10.8%
1950	3,091		−4.9%
1960	2,968		−4.0%
1970	3,107		4.7%
1980	4,044		30.2%
1990	3,673		−9.2%
2000	3,732		1.6%
2010	3,715		−0.5%
2020	3,435		−7.5%
United States Census Bureau, U.S. Decennial Census, 1870–2020.

The first European to attempt a settlement in Clendenin District was a man named Teas, who hoped to build a tannery at the present site of Henderson, on the southern bank of the Kanawha opposite Point Pleasant. However, he was forced to abandon his efforts and take shelter in Fort Randolph due to the threat of Indian raids. Indians regularly visited the area until 1795, (Note: Although Indian raids largely ceased after 1795, the last known hostilities between the Indians and the settlers in Mason County occurred about 1797, when Samuel Lewis was shot and wounded by an Indian near his cabin, at the mouth of Big Sixteenmile Creek.) when the Treaty of Greenville forced them westward into Ohio. The first permanent settlement occurred in 1795, when William Clendenin, John H. Henderson, and Samuel Henderson made their homes in the district. They were joined by Gideon H. Long in 1808; Spencer and George Withers, and Peter H. Steenbergen in 1810; Josiah Potts in 1813; and W.P.L. Neale in 1815.

Clendenin, for whom the district was named, was a veteran of the Battle of Point Pleasant, in 1774, and about 1788 came to settle in the land that would become Mason County. His homestead in Clendenin District stood opposite the city of Gallipolis. From 1789 to 1804, the area was part of Kanawha County, which obliged the residents to travel nearly sixty miles through the Kanawha Valley, between Point Pleasant and the county seat at Charleston, to conduct official business. In 1804, the settlers petitioned the Virginia General Assembly for the formation of a new county, to be named after George Mason, one of Virginia's delegates to the U.S. Constitutional Convention in 1787, and the "father" of the Bill of Rights. William Clendenin was chosen to deliver this petition to Richmond, where it was approved. Clendenin subsequently served as Mason County's first representative in the Virginia legislature. Clendenin is also credited with having brought the first domestic geese to Mason County, a flock of twenty delivered by none other than Anne Bailey.

In the autumn of 1814, Peter H. Steenbergen, one of the district's pioneers, was commissioned captain of a cavalry company requisitioned for service in the War of 1812. This was the third company raised in Mason County during the war, following the Mason County Riflemen, an infantry company led by Captain Anthony Van Sickle in 1812, and a second infantry company led by Captain William Parsons in 1813. The Riflemen had gone to the rapids of the Maumee, where they participated in the construction of Fort Meigs, while Parsons' company had gone to Norfolk, Virginia. Steenbergen's soldiers were mustered at Point Pleasant, and immediately sent out for the east coast. They had reached the summit of Big Sewell Mountain, now in Fayette County when news reached them that the Treaty of Ghent had been signed, ending the war.

The first school in Clendenin District was taught in 1816 by a master named Withrow, in a log cabin at the mouth of Arbuckle Creek, later the site of the Arbuckle Schoolhouse. The first grist mill in the district was built by John Stephens in 1834. It had a single run of stones, and was powered by a team of four horses. It was followed by a steam-powered mill built by Charles Beale. Beale, along with his uncle, Peter H. Steenbergen, were influential in developing Mason County's fledgling stock-raising industry. Steenbergen brought the first "improved breed" of cattle to Mason County, and in 1839 he and Beale introduced the first Shorthorn cattle, a breed that was soon distributed throughout the county.

After West Virginia gained its independence from Virginia in 1863, the legislature enacted a law requiring the counties to be divided into civil townships. Mason County was divided into ten townships, each of which was named after a pioneer settler of Mason County. Clendenin Township was named in honor of William Clendenin, one of the earliest settlers of the area. The spelling of the name was highly variable in the nineteenth century; "Clendenen Township" is mentioned in the Weekly Register in the year of its formation, with the surname spelled "Clendennen" directly beneath it; other early spellings included "Clendennin" and "Clendinen". As a surname, the present spelling appears in the Register from its inception in 1862, and this spelling was applied to the township by 1870, gradually becoming the predominant spelling for both the surname and the territory over the following years. Like the other townships, Clendenin was converted into a magisterial district in 1872. It is the only Clendenin District in the state.

The first post office in the district was established at Crab Creek in 1874. (Note: Hardesty's says 1873, but the records of the U.S. Post Office Department give the date of August 26, 1874. The Crab Creek Post Office was discontinued in 1876.) It operated out of the house of John R. Dabney, who was appointed the first postmaster. 1879 saw the establishment of the town of Henderson. The Gallipolis Locks and Dam, now the Robert C. Byrd Locks and Dam, were built in the southern part of the district, just above Apple Grove, in 1937.
