= Condee =

Condee may refer to:

- Condee, West Virginia
- Leander D. Condee (1847–1929), American politician
- Nancy Condee, American linguist
- MV Condee, a British coaster in service 1947-50
