= Arbuckle District, Mason County, West Virginia =

- Magisterial district
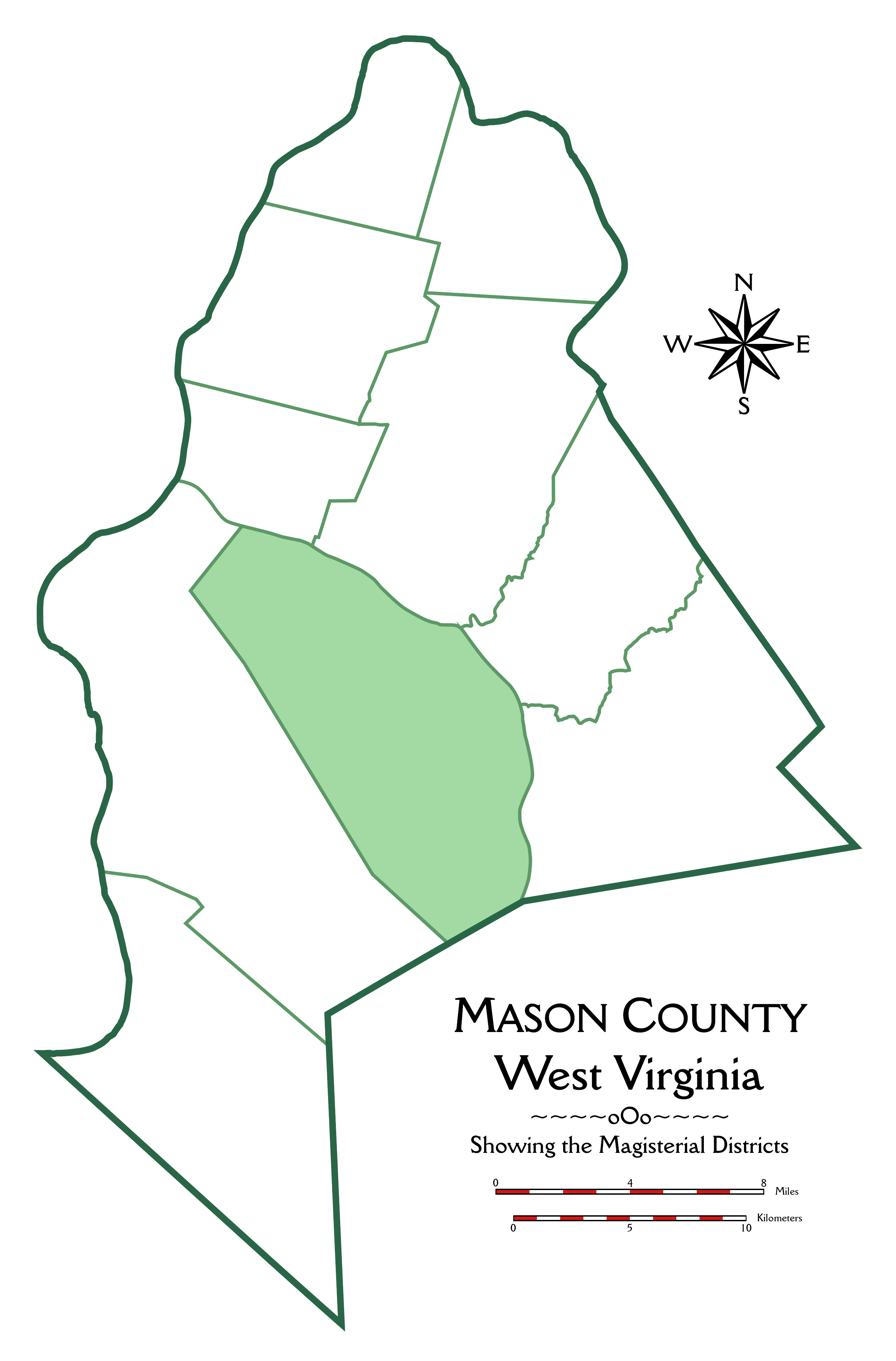
- Location of Arbuckle District in Mason County
- Coordinates: 38°44′00″N 82°01′52″W
- Country: United States
- State: West Virginia
- County: Mason
- Established: 1863
- Named after: William Arbuckle

Area
  - Total: 66.31 sq mi (171.7 km^{2})
  - Land: 65.03 sq mi (168.4 km^{2})
  - Water: 1.28 sq mi (3.3 km^{2})
- Elevation: 833 ft (254 m)

Population (2020)
  - Total: 1,054
  - Density: 17/sq mi (6.6/km^{2})
- Time zone: UTC-5 (Eastern (EST))
  - Summer (DST): UTC-4 (EDT)
- GNIS feature ID: 1928162

Arbuckle Magisterial District is one of ten magisterial districts in Mason County, West Virginia, United States. The district was originally established as a civil township in 1863, and converted into a magisterial district in 1872. In 2020, Arbuckle District was home to 1,054 people.

== Geography ==
Arbuckle District is located in the central portion of Mason County, between the Kanawha River and the northern end of Putnam County. To the north, it is bounded by the Kanawha River, and by Lewis and Cooper Districts; to the northeast by the Kanawha and Cologne District; to the east by the Kanawha and Union District; to the south by the Buffalo-Union District of Putnam County, formerly Buffalo District; and to the west and southwest by Clendenin District in Mason County.

Occupying over sixty-six square miles, Arbuckle is the second-largest of Mason County's ten magisterial districts; only Clendenin District is larger. Its northern and eastern boundary runs for sixteen miles along the Kanawha River. About sixty percent of the district is hilly, and topped with a soil containing white, red, and yellow clay. The remainder of the district consists of bottomlands, with a soil consisting of white and blue clay mixed with black loam.

=== Streams ===
The district's main streams all empty into the Kanawha River, and are named for the distance that their ends lie above the mouth of the Kanawha, or did at the time of the first settlement: Threemile, Fivemile, Lower and Upper Ninemile, Little Sixteenmile and Big Sixteenmile Creeks.

Threemile Creek drains the western end of Arbuckle District, and empties into the Kanawha a little below the mouth of another, more extensive creek also named Threemile, on the north side of the Kanawha, in Lewis and Cooper Districts. Fivemile has an extensive course on the Kanawha River Bottom, where its right-hand fork branches off to the west as Little Fivemile Creek. The main branch flows out of the hills behind Couch, where it divides into Lower Fivemile Creek, to the west, and extending into Clendenin District; and Upper Fivemile Creek, to the east, running past the village of Fivemile. Similarly, Lower and Upper Ninemile Creeks converge on the river bottom below Beech Hill. In the hills Lower Ninemile meets with Middle Ninemile Creek, which runs past Pine Grove Church and the former village of Stockton, while Upper Ninemile flows out of the hills north of the former village of Flaxton, both now part of the Chief Cornstalk Wildlife Management Area.

Little Sixteenmile flows south out of the hills around Condee, above which the main branch converges with the Shady Fork; from Condee, the creek turns eastward before reaching the river bottom at Southside. Little Sixteen then meanders northward across the floodplain, running parallel to the Kanawha for more than two miles, before discharging into the river. The upper waters of Big Sixteenmile Creek, also known as Kanawha Sixteenmile, or just Sixteen, arise in the southeastern part of Clendenin District, with the main branch and the Five Fork Branch flowing out of the hills of Crooked Ridge, Mount Union Ridge, and Dunlavy Ridge, converging before flowing eastward into Arbuckle District just above the former village of Siloam. The creek continues east past Barn Hollow, then is joined by more branches flowing south from Hambrick Ridge and north from Dunlavy, and finally leaves the hills below McCausland. Sixteenmile then meanders north for about a mile along the base of the hills, before turning eastward and flowing across the plain to the Kanawha.

Other streams in Arbuckle District include McCausland Run, which joins the Kanawha just below the Putnam County line, opposite Robertsburg; Pond Branch, which empties into the Kanawha above Ninemile; and Twomile Creek, which runs just inside the northeastern boundary with Clendenin District. The upper waters of the Ohio Sixteenmile Creek arise in the western part of Arbuckle District; the main branch meets with Wolfpen Run, and joins with the Willow Branch, flowing southward out of Arbuckle District just above Arlee.

=== Communities ===
There are no incorporated towns in Arbuckle District, but there are several unincorporated communities, including Beech Hill, Condee, Couch, Fivemile, McCausland, Southside, and the former villages of Flaxton, Siloam and Veranda.

Nine miles from the mouth of the Kanawha, Beech Hill is the largest village in Arbuckle District. The village is thought to have taken its name from the Beech Hill Methodist Episcopal Church, built there in 1860; and the church was named for the numerous beech trees that covered the hill. In the latter part of the nineteenth century, Beech Hill was the site of a large lumber depot, established by Robert Alexander in 1866. Alexander was also Beech Hill's first postmaster, from 1868 to 1872. There was a steamboat landing, sheltered from ice floes by a bend in the river, and another landing across the river at Beech Hill Station, or Debby Post Office, in Cooper District. A ferry carried passengers back and forth between the two sides.

=== Roads and travel ===
The only highway in Arbuckle District is U.S. Route 35, which runs from Scott Depot in Putnam County to Henderson, in Clendenin District, before crossing the Ohio River. For most of its length in Arbuckle District, Route 35 parallels the river at the base of the hills, but for about six miles the highway moves into the hills, diverting heavy traffic from its former route, now West Virginia Route 817, known locally as Kanawha Valley Road.

There are currently no Kanawha River crossings in Arbuckle District. Until the twentieth century, ferries carried passengers across the river at Ambrosia, Beech Hill, Leon, and Grimms Landing.

== History ==
Historical population
Census	Pop.	Note	%±
1870	1,301		—
1880	2,040		56.8%
1890	2,117		3.8%
1900	2,485		17.4%
1910	2,365		−4.8%
1920	1,928		−18.5%
1930	1,655		−14.2%
1940	1,709		3.3%
1950	1,273		−25.5%
1960	1,085		−14.8%
1970	1,048		−3.4%
1980	1,168		11.5%
1990	881		−24.6%
2000	1,080		22.6%
2010	1,121		3.8%
2020	1,054		−6.0%
United States Census Bureau, U.S. Decennial Census, 1870–2020.

According to Hardesty's Biographical Atlas of Mason County, the first resident of Arbuckle District was a squatter named Macky, who built a cabin at the mouth of Big Sixteenmile Creek circa 1794. The first regular settler was a man named Ayres, who built his homestead at the mouth of Little Sixteenmile about 1800. They were followed by John Coffman, Nathan Long, Adam Long, William Arbuckle, Andrew Bryan, Charles Day, and Thomas Saunders. William Sterrett, who for twenty-seven years was Clerk of the Mason County Court, was another early settler of the district.

In 1814, John Koontz built a horse-powered grist mill on Fivemile Creek, the first mill within the present limits of Arbuckle District. In 1818, twenty-eight students attended the first school, held in a log cabin by a teacher named Payne. William George, a Baptist minister who had first come to the district in 1811, organized the Harmony church at the mouth of Little Sixteen in 1821; several years later, he would found a church of the same name in Union District.

After West Virginia gained its independence from Virginia in 1863, the legislature enacted a law requiring the counties to be divided into civil townships. Mason County was divided into ten townships, each of which was named after a pioneer settler of Mason County. Arbuckle Township was named in honor of William Arbuckle, one of the county's earliest settlers, whose homestead stood on Thirteenmile Creek, now in Union District. It is the only Arbuckle District in the state. Like the other townships, Arbuckle was converted into a magisterial district in 1872.
