= List of magisterial districts in West Virginia =

1970 map of West Virginia, showing all of the counties, magisterial districts, and municipalities.

The U.S. state of West Virginia is divided into fifty-five counties, each of which is further subdivided into magisterial districts. The U.S. Census Bureau defines these districts as non-functioning subdivisions used for various purposes, such as conducting elections, apportioning county officials from different areas, recording land ownership, assessing property taxes, and collecting vital statistics. Magisterial districts possess no governmental organization or authority.

After attaining independence from Virginia in 1863, West Virginia's counties were divided into civil townships, with the goal of placing authority in the hands of local governments. However, township government proved impractical across the heavily rural state, with citizens unable to meet on a regular basis, and inadequate tax revenue to meet township responsibilities. Following the adoption of the Constitution of West Virginia in 1872, the townships were converted into magisterial districts, and the county courts (later county commissions) empowered to establish, consolidate, or otherwise modify them.

Each county shall be laid off by the county court into magisterial districts, not less than three nor more than ten in number, and as nearly equal as may be in territory and population. The districts as they now exist shall remain until changed by the county court. The county court may, from time to time, increase or diminish the number of such districts, and change the boundary lines thereof as necessity may require, in order to conform the same to the provisions of the Constitution of the State.

The only state other than West Virginia to use magisterial districts as a minor civil division of its counties is Virginia, which like West Virginia initially established a system of civil townships, in its Constitution of 1870. These were replaced by magisterial districts in 1874.

For most of the state's history, there were three hundred and fifty magisterial districts in West Virginia, an average of six districts per county. Greenbrier, Harrison, Mason, Ohio, and Wood Counties each contained ten districts, the maximum number provided for by state law. Brooke, Grant, and Hancock were the only counties with the minimum number of three. Twenty-four different counties included a Union District, thirteen had districts named after Ulysses S. Grant, and nine counties each had districts named for George Washington and Henry Clay.

Beginning in the 1970s, many counties combined or consolidated their original magisterial districts in order to equalize their area and population, creating districts that were fewer in number, but larger in area. This created confusion with county land and tax records, in response to which the legislature provided for the establishment of tax districts following the former magisterial district lines, as they existed on January 1, 1969. In these counties, the new magisterial districts are used only for the allocation of county officials, and the collection of census data; the former magisterial districts continue to exist in the form of tax districts.

A List of the current and former magisterial districts of West Virginia, sorted by county:

== Barbour County ==
=== Current ===
- North
- South
- West

=== Historic ===
- Barker
- Cove
- Elk
- Glade
- Philippi
- Pleasant
- Union
- Valley

== Berkeley County ==
=== Current ===
- Adam Stephens
- Norborne
- Potomac
- Shenandoah
- Tuscarora
- Valley

=== Historic ===
- Arden
- Falling Water
- Gerrardstown
- Hedgesville
- Martinsburg
- Mill Creek
- Opequon

== Boone County ==
=== Current ===
- District 1
- District 2
- District 3

=== Historic ===
- Crook
- Peytona
- Scott
- Sherman
- Washington

== Braxton County ==
=== Current ===
- Eastern
- Northern
- Southern
- Western

=== Historic ===
- Birch
- Holly
- Kanawha
- Otter
- Salt Lick

== Brooke County ==
=== Current ===
- Follansbee
- Weirton
- Wellsburg

=== Historic ===
- Buffalo
- Cross Creek

== Cabell County ==
=== Current ===
- District 1
- District 2
- District 3
- District 4
- District 5

=== Historic ===
- Barboursville
- Gideon
- Grant
- Guyandotte
- Kyle
- McComas
- Union

== Calhoun County ==
=== Current ===
- District 1
- District 2
- District 3
- District 4
- District 5

=== Historic ===
- Center
- Lee
- Sheridan
- Sherman
- Washington

== Clay County ==
=== Current ===
- District A
- District B
- District C

=== Historic ===
- Buffalo
- Henry
- Otter
- Pleasant
- Union

== Doddridge County ==
=== Current ===
- Beech
- Maple
- Oak
- Pine

=== Historic ===
- Central
- Cove
- Grant
- Greenbrier
- McClellan
- New Milton
- Southwest
- West Union

== Fayette County ==
=== Current ===
- New Haven
- Plateau
- Valley

=== Historic ===
- Falls
- Fayetteville
- Kanawha
- Mountain Cove
- Nuttall
- Quinnimont
- Sewell Mountain

== Gilmer County ==
=== Current ===
- Center
- City
- De Kalb-Troy
- Glenville

=== Historic ===
- De Kalb
- Troy

== Grant County ==
- Grant
- Milroy
- Union

== Greenbrier County ==
=== Current ===
- Central
- Eastern
- Western

=== Historic ===
- Anthony's Creek
- Big Levels
- Blue Sulphur
- Falling Spring
- Fort Spring
- Frankford
- Irish Corner
- Lewisburg
- Meadow Bluff
- White Sulphur
- Williamsburg

== Hampshire County ==
- Bloomery
- Capon
- Gore
- Mill Creek
- Romney
- Sherman
- Springfield

== Hancock County ==
=== Current ===
- Butler
- Clay
- Grant

=== Historic ===
- Poe

== Hardy County ==
- Capon
- Lost River
- Moorefield
- Old Fields
- South Fork

== Harrison County ==
=== Current ===
- Eastern
- Northern
- North Urban
- Southern
- South Urban
- Southwest

=== Historic ===
- Clark
- Clay
- Coal
- Eagle
- Elk
- Grant
- Sardis
- Simpson
- Southeast
- Suburban
- Tenmile
- Union

== Jackson County ==
=== Current ===
- Eastern
- Northern
- Western

=== Historic ===
- Grant
- Ravenswood
- Ripley
- Union
- Washington

== Jefferson County ==
=== Current ===
- Charles Town
- Harpers Ferry
- Kabletown
- Middleway
- Shepherdstown

=== Historic ===
- Bolivar
- Potomac
- Shepherd

== Kanawha County ==
=== Current ===
- District 1
- District 2
- District 3
- District 4

=== Historic ===
- Big Sandy
- Cabin Creek
- Elk
- Jefferson
- Loudon
- Malden
- Poca
- Union
- Washington
- District 5
- District 6

== Lewis County ==
=== Current ===
- Courthouse-Collins Settlement
- Freemans Creek
- Hackers Creek-Skin Creek

=== Historic ===
- Collins Settlement
- Court House
- Hackers Creek
- Skin Creek

== Lincoln County ==
=== Current ===
- District 1
- District 2
- District 3

=== Historic ===
- Carroll
- Duval
- Harts Creek
- Jefferson
- Laurel Hill
- Sheridan
- Union
- Washington

== Logan County ==
=== Current ===
- Central
- Eastern
- Western

=== Historic ===
- Buffalo
- Chapmanville
- East
- Guyan
- Hardee
- Island Creek
- Lee
- Logan
- Magnolia
- Northwest
- Triadelphia
- West

== Marion County ==
=== Current ===
- Middletown
- Palatine
- West Augusta

=== Historic ===
- Fairmont
- Grant
- Lincoln
- Mannington
- Paw Paw
- Union
- Winfield

== Marshall County ==
=== Current ===
- District 1
- District 2
- District 3

=== Historic ===
- Cameron
- Clay
- Franklin
- Liberty
- Meade
- Sand Hill
- Union
- Washington
- Webster

== Mason County ==
- Arbuckle
- Clendenin
- Cologne
- Cooper
- Graham
- Hannan
- Lewis
- Robinson
- Union
- Waggener

== McDowell County ==
=== Current ===
- Big Creek
- Browns Creek
- North Elkin
- Sandy River

=== Historic ===
- Adkin
- Elk
- North Fork

== Mercer County ==
=== Current ===
- District I
- District II
- District III

=== Historic ===
- Beaver Pond
- East River
- Jumping Branch
- Plymouth
- Rock

== Mineral County ==
=== Current ===
- District 1
- District 2
- District 3

=== Historic ===
- Cabin Run
- Elk
- Frankfort
- New Creek
- Piedmont
- Welton

== Mingo County ==
=== Current ===
- Beech Ben Mate
- Kermit Harvey
- Lee
- Magnolia
- Stafford
- Tug Hardee
- Williamson

=== Historic ===
- Hardee
- Harvey
- Kermit
- Tug River

== Monongalia County ==
=== Current ===
- Central
- Eastern
- Western

=== Historic ===
- Battelle
- Cass
- Clay
- Clinton
- Grant
- Morgan
- Union

== Monroe County ==
=== Current ===
- Central
- Eastern
- Western

=== Historic ===
- Forest Hill
- Red Sulphur
- Second Creek
- Springfield
- Sweet Springs
- Union
- Wolf Creek

== Morgan County ==
=== Current ===
- District 1
- District 2
- District 3

=== Historic ===
- Allen
- Bath
- Cacapon
- Rock Gap
- Sleepy Creek
- Timber Ridge
- District 4

== Nicholas County ==
- Beaver
- Grant
- Hamilton
- Jefferson
- Kentucky
- Summersville
- Wilderness

== Ohio County ==
=== Current ===
- District 1
- District 2
- District 3

=== Historic ===
- Center
- Clay
- Liberty
- Madison
- Richland
- Ritchie
- Triadelphia
- Union
- Washington
- Webster

== Pendleton County ==
=== Current ===
- Central
- Eastern
- Western

=== Historic ===
- Bethel
- Circleville
- Franklin
- Mill Run
- Sugar Grove
- Union

== Pleasants County ==
=== Current ===
- District A
- District B
- District C
- District D

=== Historic ===
- Grant
- Jefferson
- Lafayette
- McKim
- Union
- Washington

== Pocahontas County ==
- Edray
- Greenbank
- Huntersville
- Little Levels

== Preston County ==
=== Current ===
- First
- Second
- Third
- Fourth
- Fifth

=== Historic ===
- Grant
- Kingwood
- Lyon
- Pleasant
- Portland
- Reno
- Union
- Valley

== Putnam County ==
=== Current ===
- Buffalo-Union
- Curry
- Pocatalico
- Scott
- Teays

=== Historic ===
- Buffalo
- Union

== Raleigh County ==
=== Current ===
- District 1
- District 2
- District 3

=== Historic ===
- Clear Fork
- Marsh Fork
- Richmond
- Shady Spring
- Slab Fork
- Town
- Trap Hill

== Randolph County ==
- Beverly
- Dry Fork
- Huttonsville
- Leadsville
- Middle Fork
- Mingo
- New Interest
- Roaring Creek
- Valley Bend

== Ritchie County ==
- Clay
- Grant
- Murphy
- Union

== Roane County ==
=== Current ===
- Eastern
- Northern
- Southern
- Western

=== Historic ===
- Curtis
- Geary
- Harper
- Reedy
- Smithfield
- Spencer
- Walton

== Summers County ==
=== Current ===
- Bluestone River
- Greenbrier River
- New River

=== Historic ===
- Forest Hill
- Greenbrier
- Green Sulphur
- Jumping Branch
- Pipestem
- Talcott

== Taylor County ==
=== Current ===
- Eastern
- Tygart
- Western

=== Historic ===
- Booths Creek
- Court House
- Fetterman
- Flemington
- Grafton
- Knottsville

== Tucker County ==
- Black Fork
- Clover
- Davis
- Dry Fork
- Fairfax
- Licking
- St. George

== Tyler County ==
=== Current ===
- Central
- North
- South
- West

=== Historic ===
- Centreville
- Ellsworth
- Lincoln
- McElroy
- Meade
- Union

== Upshur County ==
=== Current ===
- First
- Second
- Third

=== Historic ===
- Banks
- Buckhannon
- Meade
- Union
- Warren
- Washington

== Wayne County ==
=== Current ===
- Butler
- Ceredo
- Stonewall
- Union
- Westmoreland

=== Historic ===
- Grant
- Lincoln

== Webster County ==
=== Current ===
- Central
- Northern
- Southern

=== Historic ===
- Fork Lick
- Glade
- Hacker Valley
- Holly

== Wetzel County ==
=== Current ===
- District 1
- District 2
- District 3

=== Historic ===
- Center
- Church
- Clay
- Grant
- Green
- Proctor
- Magnolia

== Wirt County ==
=== Current ===
- Central
- Northeast
- Southwest

=== Historic ===
- Burning Springs
- Clay
- Elizabeth
- Newark
- Reedy
- Spring Creek
- Tucker

== Wood County ==
- Clay
- Harris
- Lubeck
- Parkersburg
- Slate
- Steele
- Tygart
- Union
- Walker
- Williams

== Wyoming County ==
=== Current ===
- District 1
- District 2
- District 3

=== Historic ===
- Baileysville
- Barkers Ridge
- Center
- Clear Fork
- Huff Creek
- Oceana
- Slab Fork
