= Ben Lomond, West Virginia =

Unincorporated community in West Virginia, United States

- Unincorporated community
- Location within West Virginia Location within the United States
- Coordinates: 38°42′28″N 82°10′40″W
- Country: United States
- State: West Virginia
- County: Mason
- District: Clendenin
- Elevation: 561 ft (171 m)
- Time zone: UTC-5 (Eastern (EST))
  - Summer (DST): UTC-4 (EDT)
- Area codes: 304 & 681
- GNIS feature ID: 1550259

Ben Lomond is an unincorporated community in Mason County, West Virginia, United States. It is located on the eastern bank of the Ohio River at the junction of West Virginia Route 2 and County Route 56, (Mud Run Road), some 9.7 miles (15.6 km) south-southwest of Point Pleasant.

Ben Lomond is in the watershed of Mud Run, one of the tributaries of Crab Creek. A CSX Transportation line — which was formerly part of the Baltimore & Ohio Railroad — runs through the community. Ben Lomond once had a post office, which is now closed. The community was named for Ben Lomond, a celebrated mountain in Scotland.

== History ==
Ben Lomond and adjacent settlements were in a region on the east bank of the Ohio River known as Mercer's Bottom since the 1790s. About a mile south of Ben Lomond is the settlement of Hogsett, near the mouth of Flatfoot Creek. Hogsett received its post office in 1885 and Ben Lomond received its post office in 1886, and for a while the U.S. Post Office Department wavered between which village should keep one. Ben Lomond's post office closed permanently in 1919, while Hogsett's remained until 1967. Both communities were formerly more populous, but have dwindled to almost no inhabitants.
