= Lewis District, Mason County, West Virginia =

- Magisterial district
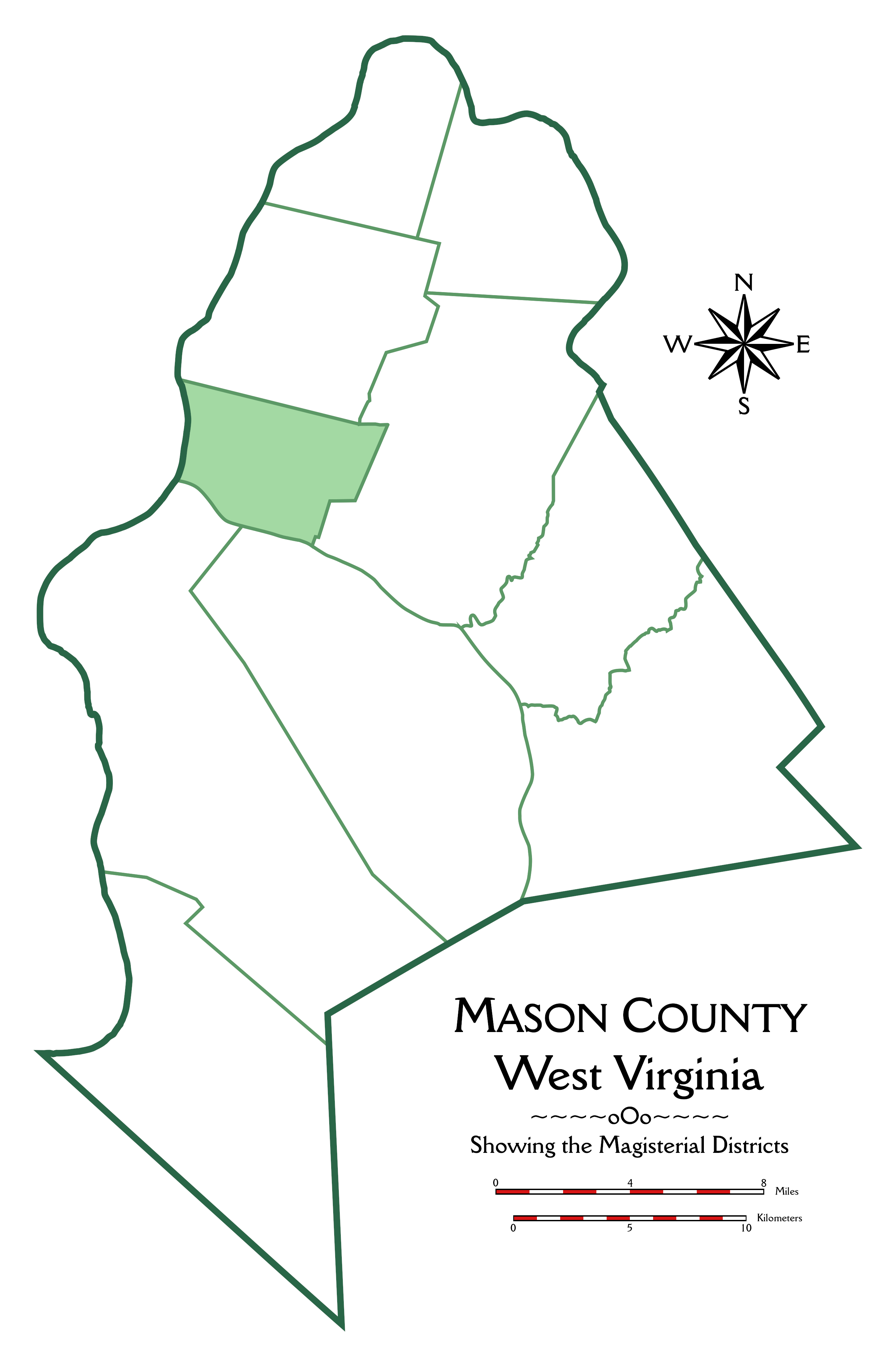
- Location of Lewis District in Mason County
- Coordinates: 38°50′49″N 82°05′34″W
- Country: United States
- State: West Virginia
- County: Mason
- Established: 1863
- Named for: Andrew Lewis

Area
  - Total: 18.92 sq mi (49.0 km^{2})
  - Land: 17.86 sq mi (46.3 km^{2})
  - Water: 1.06 sq mi (2.7 km^{2})
- Elevation: 768 ft (234 m)

Population (2020)
  - Total: 5,635
  - Density: 321/sq mi (124/km^{2})
- Time zone: UTC-5 (Eastern (EST))
  - Summer (DST): UTC-4 (EDT)
- GNIS feature ID: 1928302

Lewis Magisterial District is one of ten magisterial districts in Mason County, West Virginia, United States. The district was originally established as a civil township in 1863, and converted into a magisterial district in 1872. In 2020, Robinson District was home to 5,635 people.

== Geography ==
Lewis District is located at the confluence of the Ohio River and the Great Kanawha, in the northern part of Mason County. To the north, it is bounded by Robinson District, to the east by Cooper District, to the south by the Kanawha River, and to the west by the Ohio. On the south side of the Kanawha are Arbuckle and Clendenin Districts, and across the Ohio to the west are Addison Township and the northernmost part of Gallipolis Township, both in Gallia County, Ohio.

At just under nineteen square miles, Lewis is the smallest of Mason County's ten magisterial districts. Like most of Mason County, the majority of Lewis District is hilly, but there are broad river bottoms in the eastern and southeastern parts of the district. On the eastern side of the district, the bottom land is occupied by the city of Point Pleasant, the district's only incorporated community, and the county seat.

Besides Point Pleasant, the only other community in Lewis District is the unincorporated village of Hickory, the site of Hickory Chapel, and a post office from 1874 to 1906. A former village, Heights, was absorbed into Point Pleasant during the mid-twentieth century. The original settlement was just north of the boundary with Robinson District, but it gradually extended southward into Lewis District until it reached the northern end of Point Pleasant.

The main streams in Lewis District are Crooked Creek and Threemile Creek. Crooked Creek flows through the northern part of the district, and at the base of the hills east of Point Pleasant. Until the 1940s, Crooked Creek formed the eastern boundary of Point Pleasant, flowing into the Kanawha River about half a mile above its confluence with the Ohio. As part of the flood control projects following the 1937 Ohio River flood, a flood wall was constructed around the Point Pleasant riverfront, and Crooked Creek was diverted into the Ohio River north of the floodwall. The former right-hand fork of Crooked Creek still flows into the Kanawha through the original mouth of the creek. A smaller run flows into the Kanawha about half a mile above the old outlet of Crooked Creek. Threemile Creek flows through the southeastern part of the district, emptying into the Kanawha three miles above Point Pleasant. Besides these, Oldtown Creek, most of which lies in Robinson and Cooper Districts, flows through the northwest corner of Lewis District before joining the Ohio.

There are two main highways in Lewis District. West Virginia Route 2 runs south along the Ohio River from Point Pleasant to Huntington, and eastward through the hills to Ravenswood, in Jackson County. West Virginia Route 62 runs southeast along the Kanawha from Point Pleasant to Buffalo in Putnam County, and northward along the Ohio River, through Mason City, Hartford, and New Haven, before joining Route 2 at Mount Alto in Jackson County. Other important routes in Lewis District include Jericho Road, which traverses the center of the district from Point Pleasant to Hickory, where it meets Route 2; and the western end of Sand Hill Road, which travels through the middle of the county from Point Pleasant to Letart.

Two railroads meet at Point Pleasant. The first, once part of the Kanawha and Michigan Railroad, followed the course of the Kanawha River from Charleston, and crossed the Ohio to Kanauga, Ohio, where it originally joined the Hocking Valley Railroad. Completed in 1885, the railroad bridge was the first span crossing the Ohio at Point Pleasant; the original bridge was replaced in 1919. This line is currently leased by the Kanawha River Railroad from Norfolk Southern, and carries freight from southeastern West Virginia to central Ohio. A second line, formerly part of the Baltimore and Ohio Railroad, now CSX Transportation, follows the Ohio River for the length of the county, between Huntington and Ravenswood, crossing the Kanawha just east of Henderson and Point Pleasant.

In the early twentieth century, three ferries carried passengers between Point Pleasant, Henderson, and Kanauga. These became obsolete with the construction bridges spanning the Ohio and Kanawha Rivers. The Silver Bridge, between Sixth Street in Point Pleasant and Kanauga, was built in 1928; it famously collapsed in 1967, and was replaced by the Silver Memorial Bridge, built two years later, and a mile downstream, in Clendenin District. The Shadle Bridge was built in 1931 between Viand Street in Point Pleasant, and Henderson on the south side of the Kanawha. It was replaced by the Bartow Jones Bridge in 1998.

== History ==
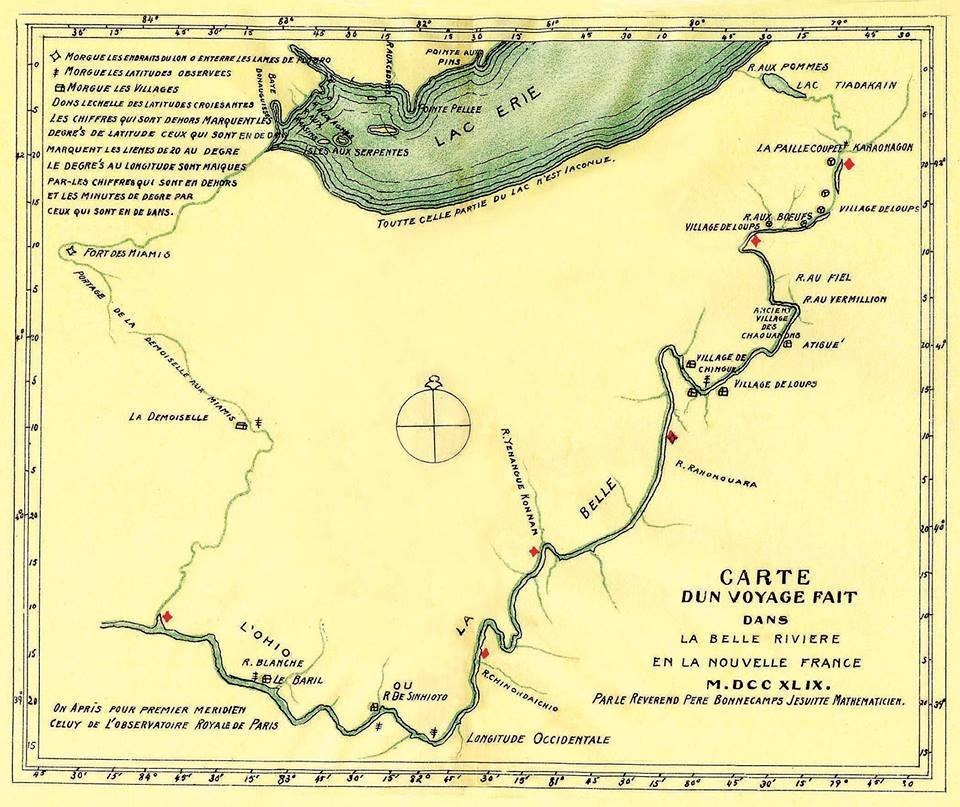
Map of Céloron's expedition in 1749; the site of Point Pleasant is marked by a red diamond above the mouth of the Kanawha, here called "R. Chinondaichio".

Although there is abundant evidence of Indian presence in the lands that would become Mason County prior to the arrival of Europeans, including by various groups of Mound Builders, by the mid-eighteenth century the area was largely uninhabited. This was likely due to pressure from the Iroquois Confederacy, which pushed most of the aboriginal inhabitants west of the Ohio. A notable exception in Mason County was a Shawnee town near the mouth of the Great Kanawha, which still existed in colonial times, and was known to the colonists as "Oldtown". An important Indian road, the Buffalo or Kanawha Trail, followed the north bank of the Kanawha through present-day Lewis District.

=== Early exploration ===
French and Dutch traders had visited the Ohio Valley before 1700, but there is no definite record of exploration in Mason County until 1742, when Virginians John Howard and John Peter Salling followed the Kanawha to its mouth. Competing claims to the Ohio Country by France and Britain following the conclusion of King George's War led to the expedition of Pierre Joseph Céloron de Blainville, who traveled the length of the Ohio in 1749, burying lead plaques stating France's claim to the territory at the mouths of the river's principal tributaries. One such plaque was buried at the future site of Point Pleasant (Note: This plaque was discovered in 1846, and is preserved by the Virginia Historical Society.) on August 18, 1749. During the winter of 1750 and 1751, Christopher Gist explored both sides of the Ohio on behalf of the Ohio Company of Virginia. Gist reached the mouth of the Kanawha, now in Lewis and Clendenin Districts, but no attempt was made to settle in Mason County until after the French and Indian War.

The land that would become Mason County, West Virginia was first surveyed in 1772 by a team led by George Washington; his brother, Augustine, had been one of the organizers of the Ohio Company. The team surveyed a tract of 51,302 acres, just over eighty square miles, lying between Letart Falls on the Ohio, and the mouth of Threemile Creek on the Great Kanawha, including most of Lewis District, most of Robinson, and all of Waggener and Graham Districts. The land was patented to them on December 15, 1772, by Lord Dunmore, the royal governor of Virginia, on behalf of King George III. Most of Lewis District consists of a 9,000 acre section allocated to Andrew Lewis, and accounting for the majority of the roughly 12,109 acres now lying in the district. The balance includes submerged land in the Ohio and Kanawha Rivers, as well as a parcel of land in the southeastern portion of the district, east of the mouth of Threemile Creek, not included in the original survey.

Historical population
Census	Pop.	Note	%±
1870	1,364		—
1880	1,646		20.7%
1890	2,435		47.9%
1900	2,628		7.9%
1910	3,029		15.3%
1920	3,533		16.6%
1930	3,939		11.5%
1940	4,343		10.3%
1950	5,609		29.2%
1960	6,925		23.5%
1970	7,437		7.4%
1980	7,169		−3.6%
1990	6,533		−8.9%
2000	6,310		−3.4%
2010	6,082		−3.6%
2020	5,635		−7.3%
United States Census Bureau, U.S. Decennial Census, 1870–2020.

=== Indian warfare ===
An outbreak of hostilities between the colonists and the Indians led to Lord Dunmore's War in 1774. In the course of this conflict, Governor Dunmore ordered a regiment of Virginia Militia, under Colonel Andrew Lewis, to proceed to the mouth of the Kanawha, where he arrived on October 6. Although Dunmore sent instructions to Lewis to cross the Ohio and rendezvous with the governor's army near Chillicothe, his men were reluctant to abandon their strategic position—on land that Lewis himself claimed—and they set about constructing a fort at the present site of Point Pleasant. Here they were attacked by a force of Indians led by Chief Cornstalk on October 9. After a hard-fought battle, Cornstalk's men retreated, leaving the Virginians victorious in the only major battle of the war.

Cornstalk subsequently made peace with the colonists, but while visiting Fort Randolph to warn the garrison of an alliance between the Shawnees and the British, the soldiers seized him and his son, Elinipsico, and two other Shawnees in retaliation for the murder of two militiamen by unknown Indians. The prisoners were subsequently murdered by the soldiers, over the protests of Captain Matthew Arbuckle. Although Indian forces appeared before the fort over the winter and again in May 1778, there were no major battles. Indian raids into the area continued as late as 1792, after which the growing number of settlers and their defenses deterred further incursions.

=== Lewis District and Point Pleasant ===
The first settlers at Point Pleasant referred to it as "Shawneetown", due to the nearby Indian village at the mouth of Oldtown Creek, but as the Indians abandoned their settlement, the Virginians began to call their new village "Point Pleasant". Among the early settlers was Daniel Boone, who had been a scout for Colonel Lewis during Dunmore's War, and subsequently settled in Kentucky. He came to Point Pleasant in 1788, and opened a trading post. He was named Lieutenant Colonel of the Kanawha County Militia, (Note: The territory that became Mason County was part of Kanawha County from 1789 to 1804.) and served a term in the Virginia House of Delegates beginning in 1791. He returned to Kentucky in 1795.

In 1804, the Virginia legislature agreed to the petition of the residents for the creation of a new county, named for George Mason, with its seat at Point Pleasant. The first meeting of the county court was held in the house of William Owens on July 3, 1804. Francis Watkins was commissioned Sheriff, William Sterrett Clerk of the Mason County Court, Samuel Clemens Revenue Commissioner, Robert McKee surveyor, and Jesse Bennett Colonel of the County Militia. Soon afterwards, Walter Newman was licensed to operate ferries across the Ohio and Kanawha Rivers, and to keep a tavern at Point Pleasant, and the following year Sheriff Watkins was licensed to perform marriages.

Lewis District was almost entirely rural during the first half of the nineteenth century. Despite being the county seat, Point Pleasant was not surveyed until 1819, and not incorporated until 1833. Superstitious inhabitants attributed the town's failure to thrive to a curse brought about by the murder of Chief Cornstalk. There were few buildings in 1825, including the courthouse; four stores, one of them housing the post office; a hotel; and a horse-powered grist mill. All of the structures were wooden, except for two built from brick. The first steam-powered grist mill was built by Edmund Franklin and William W. Martin in 1832, and the first saw mill built by Franklin in 1839. By 1843, there were two churches, three stores, and about fifty houses. The Merchants and Mechanics Bank opened at Point Pleasant in 1853. After a long, slow beginning, the town grew considerably over the next thirty years. The Weekly Register, now the Point Pleasant Register, was founded by George W. Tippett in 1862.

During the Civil War, the only battle occurring in Mason County occurred at Point Pleasant. On March 30, 1863, Confederate General Albert Gallatin Jenkins, a native of neighboring Cabell County, attacked the Federal garrison at Point Pleasant with four hundred men from the 8th and 16th Virginia Cavalry, hoping to capture government horses and military supplies. The defenders, from Company 'E', 13th Virginia Infantry, commanded by Captain John D. Carter, took refuge inside the courthouse. The town was briefly shelled by a Federal artillery battery that had been stationed in Gallipolis, and taken up a position across the Ohio River at Kanauga. Not finding the anticipated stores, and concluding that the Federal troops were too firmly emplaced, Jenkins withdrew his men across the Kanawha. The skirmish resulted in very few casualties, but was notable for the murder of an elderly civilian, Andrew Waggener, one of the pioneer settlers of the county, and a veteran of the Battle of Craney Island during the War of 1812, by a Confederate soldier who had demanded Waggener's horse.

After West Virginia gained its independence from Virginia in 1863, the legislature enacted a law requiring the counties to be divided into civil townships. Mason County was divided into ten townships, each of which was named after a pioneer settler of Mason County. The township including Point Pleasant was named in honour of Andrew Lewis, largely in recognition of his action at the Battle of Point Pleasant, and the fact that the land on which the battle was fought had been surveyed for and granted to him. Although one of the original proprietors of Mason County, Lewis never settled on his claim. During the War of Independence, Lewis was commissioned a brigadier general by the Continental Congress, but he retired due to ill health and dissatisfaction with his post in 1780, and died while on his way home to Botetourt County. Like the other townships, Lewis was converted into a magisterial district in 1872. Although other locations in West Virginia also honour Colonel Lewis, including Lewis County and the city of Lewisburg, Mason County has the only Lewis District.
