= Raccoon Island (Ohio) =

Submerged island in Gallia County, Ohio, United States

- Interactive map of Raccoon Island

Geography
- Location: Ohio River, Gallia County, Ohio
- Coordinates: 38°43′52″N 82°11′25″W
- Length: 1/3 mi (1 km)
- Highest elevation: 535 ft (163.1 m)

Administration
- United States

Additional information
- GNIS feature ID 1051244

Raccoon Island is a former island in Gallia County, Ohio, now submerged in the Ohio River. It was located above the mouth of Raccoon Creek, in Clay Township, opposite the mouth of Crab Creek in Mason County, West Virginia.

Most islands in the Ohio River between Ohio and West Virginia belong to West Virginia, which was part of Virginia until 1863. When Virginia ceded its claim to the Northwest Territory in 1784, it reserved control of the Ohio River along its borders, including the submerged land up to the low water mark on the Ohio shore. Raccoon Island's inclusion as part of Ohio meant that at low water levels, the island was connected to Gallia County by land. However, this is no longer the case, as the construction of the Gallipolis Locks and Dam in 1937 permanently raised the level of the river; leading to the island's disappearance.

According to a United States Geological Survey topographical map from 1906, Raccoon Island measured approximately a third of a mile in length and about five hundred feet in width. It was situated closer to the Ohio side of the river than the West Virginia side. The upper end of the island was rounded, while the eastern side curved gently to the southern end, and the Ohio side was relatively straight. The two sides converged at a narrow point. The northern part of the island gradually sloped up to the highest point, approximately forty feet above the mean level of the river, whereas the western bank was relatively steep. The USGS reported a populated place of the same name southwest of the island at an elevation of 571 feet.

The Western Pilot, an annual publication of inland navigation charts by Samuel Cummings lists Racoon Island as "a very small island; on the lower extremity of a large bar. Channel to the left, and near the island at its foot. Raccoon Creek comes in on the right, just below the island. This is a considerable creek, rising in the western part of Athens, and eastern part of Hocking county, and is famous for its quarries of stone; from which are manufactured burr mill stones, said to be of a quality equal to the best French burrs.".

Hardesty's History of Gallia County mentions that "[a] post office was established, at a very early date upon Raccoon Island situated in the Ohio river, at the mouth of Raccoon creek." The records of the United States Post Office Department indicate that William F. Gooldin was appointed postmaster at Raccoon Island on August 18, 1841; the last postmaster was Berton H. Ingels, appointed February 3, 1909. The post office was discontinued, effective October 15, 1936, and the mail redirected to Gallipolis. The island may have been rapidly eroding, or perhaps was being abandoned due to the planned construction of the Gallipolis Locks and Dam, which raised the height of the river. By 1958, Raccoon Island was entirely submerged, and appears as a shoal in the Ohio River on USGS maps. The elevation of 535 feet places it three feet under the mean level of the river, which is 538 feet at a point just below the southern tip of the island.
