= Apple Grove, Mason County, West Virginia =

Apple Grove, West Virginia
- Census-designated place
- Location within West Virginia
- Coordinates: 38°39′54″N 82°10′09″W
- Country: United States
- State: West Virginia
- County: Mason

Area
  - Total: 2.458 sq mi (6.37 km^{2})
  - Land: 2.303 sq mi (5.96 km^{2})
  - Water: 0.155 sq mi (0.40 km^{2})
- Elevation: 591 ft (180 m)

Population (2020)
  - Total: 187
  - Density: 81.2/sq mi (31.4/km^{2})
- Time zone: UTC-5 (Eastern (EST))
  - Summer (DST): UTC-4 (EDT)
- ZIP code: 25502
- Area codes: 304 & 681
- GNIS feature ID: 1553735

Apple Grove is a census-designated place (CDP) in Mason County, West Virginia, United States, on the Ohio River located along West Virginia Route 2. Apple Grove lies just south of Gallipolis Ferry. As of the 2020 census, its population was 187 (down from 204 at the 2010 census). It is part of the Point Pleasant, WV–OH Micropolitan Statistical Area.

== Climate ==
The climate in this area is characterized by relatively high temperatures and evenly distributed precipitation throughout the year. According to the Köppen Climate Classification system, Apple Grove has a humid subtropical climate, abbreviated "Cfa" on climate maps.

Climate data for Apple Grove, Mason County, West Virginia
Month	Jan	Feb	Mar	Apr	May	Jun	Jul	Aug	Sep	Oct	Nov	Dec	Year
Mean daily maximum °C (°F)	5 (41)	7 (45)	13 (55)	19 (66)	24 (75)	28 (83)	30 (86)	29 (85)	26 (79)	20 (68)	13 (56)	7 (45)	18 (65)
Mean daily minimum °C (°F)	−6 (21)	−5 (23)	−1 (31)	4 (40)	9 (49)	14 (58)	17 (63)	17 (62)	12 (54)	6 (43)	1 (33)	−4 (25)	6 (42)
Average precipitation mm (inches)	81 (3.2)	74 (2.9)	99 (3.9)	86 (3.4)	99 (3.9)	91 (3.6)	100 (4)	89 (3.5)	76 (3)	64 (2.5)	71 (2.8)	79 (3.1)	1,010 (39.8)
Source: Weatherbase
