= Leander D. Condee =

American politician

Leander Devine Condee
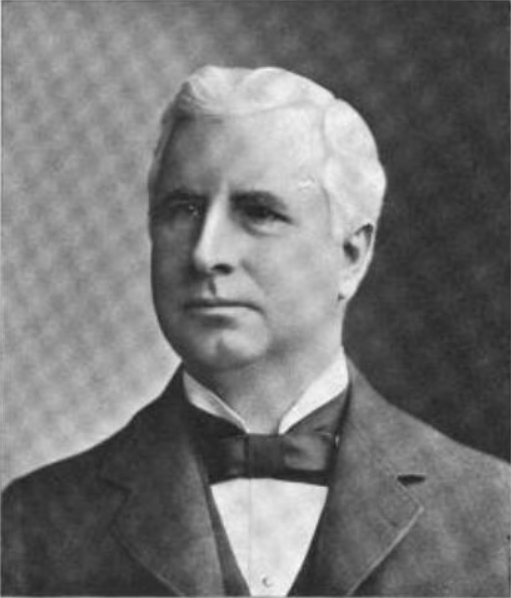

Member of the Illinois Senate from the 2nd district
- In office 1880 – 1884
- Preceded by: David N. Bash
- Succeeded by: Charles H. Crawford

Personal details
- Born: September 26, 1847 Athens County, Ohio
- Died: January 14, 1929 (aged 81) Chicago, Illinois
- Party: Republican
- Profession: Attorney

Leander Devine Condee (September 26, 1847 – January 14, 1929) was an American attorney and politician from Ohio. A graduate of the University of Michigan, Condee ran a law office in Missouri for four years before settling in Chicago, Illinois. From 1880 to 1884, Condee served in the Illinois Senate. He later formed a law partnership with former U.S. Representative Legrand W. Perce.

== Biography ==
Leander Devine Condee was born in Athens County, Ohio, on September 26, 1847. He attended public schools in Kankakee, Illinois, then attended St. Paul's Academy. He studied law at the University of Michigan, graduating with a Bachelor of Laws in 1868. In 1869, he opened a law office in Butler, Missouri, which he ran for four years. He decided to then come to Chicago, Illinois, which was rebuilding following the 1871 Great Chicago Fire.

In Chicago, Condee focused on chancery practice and corporation law. He practiced with a variety of partners in his early years, most notably as Condee & Rose, but also occasionally practiced alone. In 1880, Condee was elected as a Republican to the Illinois Senate, serving for four years. From 1879 to 1883, he was village attorney for Hyde Park, Illinois. He returned to this role from 1891 to 1894 after Hyde Park was annexed by Chicago. He was nominated as the Republicans' candidate to the Superior Court of Cook County in 1892, but was defeated. He formed a partnership with Legrand W. Perce in 1899 as Condee & Perce.

Condee married Martha Jane Waterbury; they had three children. Condee was a member of the Chicago Bar Association and was on its Committee on Grievances, responsible for disbarring unworthy attorneys. He lectured at the Chicago Law School, which conferred an honorary Legum Doctor upon him. He was a member of the Union League Club of Chicago and was a trustee of St. James' Methodist Episcopal Church. He lived in the Kenwood neighborhood. He died in Chicago on January 14, 1929.
