= MV Clary (1939) =

Ship

History
- Name: Hermann Litmeyer (1939-45); Empire Condee (1945-47); Condee (1947-50); Aisne (1950-60); Clary (1960-75); Marie Elizabeth (1975-76)
- Owner: Gebr. Elfring (1939-45); Ministry of War Transport (1945); Ministry of Transport (1945-47); Dutch Government (1947-50); Wm H Muller & Co Ltd (1950-60); Channel Shipping Ltd (1960-76); M Garzon (1976)
- Operator: Maria Litmeyer (1939-45); Ministry of War Transport (1945); Ministry of Transport (1945-50); Vianda Steamship Co Ltd (1950-60); Channel Shipping Ltd (1960-75); M Garzon (1975-76)
- Port of registry: (Nazi Germany) Haren-Ems (1938-45); (United Kingdom) London (1945-47); (Netherlands) 's Gravenhage (1947-50); (United Kingdom) London (1950-60); (United Kingdom) Jersey (1960-75); Panama City (1975-76)
- Builder: Van Diepen Scheepswerf Gebroeders NV,
- Yard number: 834
- Launched: March 1939
- In service: 20 June 1939
- Out of service: 20 February 1976
- Identification: Code Letters GSKB (1950-60); IMO Number 5075608 ( -1976)
- Fate: Scrapped 1976

General characteristics
- Type: Coaster
- Tonnage: 215 GRT; 96 NRT; 305 DWT
- Length: 121 ft 3 in (36.96 m)
- Beam: 22 ft 9 in (6.93 m)
- Depth: 8 ft 7 in (2.62 m)
- Installed power: 4SCSA diesel engine
- Propulsion: Screw propeller
- Speed: 7.5 knots (13.9 km/h)

Clary was a 215 GRT coaster that was built in 1939 by Van Diepen Scheepswerf Gebroeders NV, Waterhuizen, Netherlands, for German owners. She was seized by the Allies in May 1945 at Nyborg, Denmark and passed to the Ministry of War Transport (MoWT) and renamed Empire Condee. In 1947, she was sold into merchant service and was renamed Condee. In 1950, a further sale saw her renamed Aisne. In 1960, she was sold to Jersey and renamed Clary. In 1975, she was sold to Algerian owners and renamed Marie Elizabeth but on 20 February 1976 she caught fire and was declared a constructive total loss.

== Description ==
The ship was built in 1938 by Van Diepen Scheepswerf Gebroeders NV, Waterhuizen, Netherlands, as yard number 834.

The ship was 121 feet 3 inches (36.96 m) long, with a beam of 22 feet 9 inches (6.93 m) a depth of 8 feet 7 inches (2.62 m). She had a GRT of 215 and a NRT of 96, with a DWT of 305.

The ship was propelled by a 4-stroke Single Cycle Single Acting diesel engine, which had 4 cylinders of 11 inches (28 cm) diameter by 17 11/16 (45 cm) stroke. The engine was built by Humboldt-Deutzmotoren AG, Köln-Deutz. The engine could propel her at 7.5 knots (13.9 km/h).

== History ==
Herman Litmeyer was built for Gebr. Elfring. She entered service on 20 June 1939. Her port of registry was Haren a/d Ems. She was placed under the management of Maria Litmeyer. In May 1945, Herman Litmeyer was seized by the Allies at Nyborg, Denmark. She was passed to the MoWT and was renamed Empire Condee. In 1947, she was allocated to the Dutch Government and was renamed Condee.

In 1950, she was sold to Wm H Muller & Co Ltd, London and was renamed Aisne. She was operated by the Vianda Steamship Co Ltd, London. The Code Letters GSKB were allocated. In 1960, she was sold to Shipping & Trading Co Ltd, Jersey and was renamed Clary. With the introduction on IMO Numbers, Clary was allocated 5075608. In 1975, she was sold to Manuel Garcon, Tangier and renamed Marie Elizabeth. She was placed under the Panamanian flag. On 20 February 1976, a fire broke out while Marie Elizabeth was moored at Barcelona, Spain. She was declared a total loss.
