= Hogsett, West Virginia =

- Unincorporated community
- Location within West Virginia Location within the United States
- Coordinates: 38°41′33″N 82°10′34″W
- Country: United States
- State: West Virginia
- County: Mason
- Elevation: 558 ft (170 m)
- Time zone: UTC-5 (Eastern (EST))
  - Summer (DST): UTC-4 (EDT)
- Area codes: 304 & 681
- GNIS feature ID: 1551470

Hogsett is an unincorporated community on the east bank of the Ohio River in Mason County, West Virginia, USA. It is on West Virginia Route 2, some 10.7 miles (17.2 km) south-southwest of Point Pleasant at the mouth of Flatfoot Creek. This region has been known as Mercers Bottom since the late 18th century.

The community of Hogsett was originally known as "Hogsett Landing" (a minor river access point) after a local dry goods merchant and grocer — Charles W. Hogsett (1856-1913) — whose parents located there in the late 1840s. In 1885, Hogsett became the official postmaster of "Hogsett Post Office" which closed in 1967.

The closest named community near Hogsett is Ben Lomond, about a mile away.
