= Couch, West Virginia =

Unincorporated community in West Virginia, United States

- Unincorporated community
- Location within West Virginia Location within the United States
- Coordinates: 38°47′19″N 82°03′32″W
- Country: United States
- State: West Virginia
- County: Mason
- Elevation: 581 ft (177 m)
- Time zone: UTC-5 (Eastern (EST))
  - Summer (DST): UTC-4 (EDT)
- GNIS feature ID: 1549644

Couch is an unincorporated community in Mason County, West Virginia, United States. Their post office is closed.
