= Point Pleasant Register =

Newspaper for Point Pleasant, West Virginia

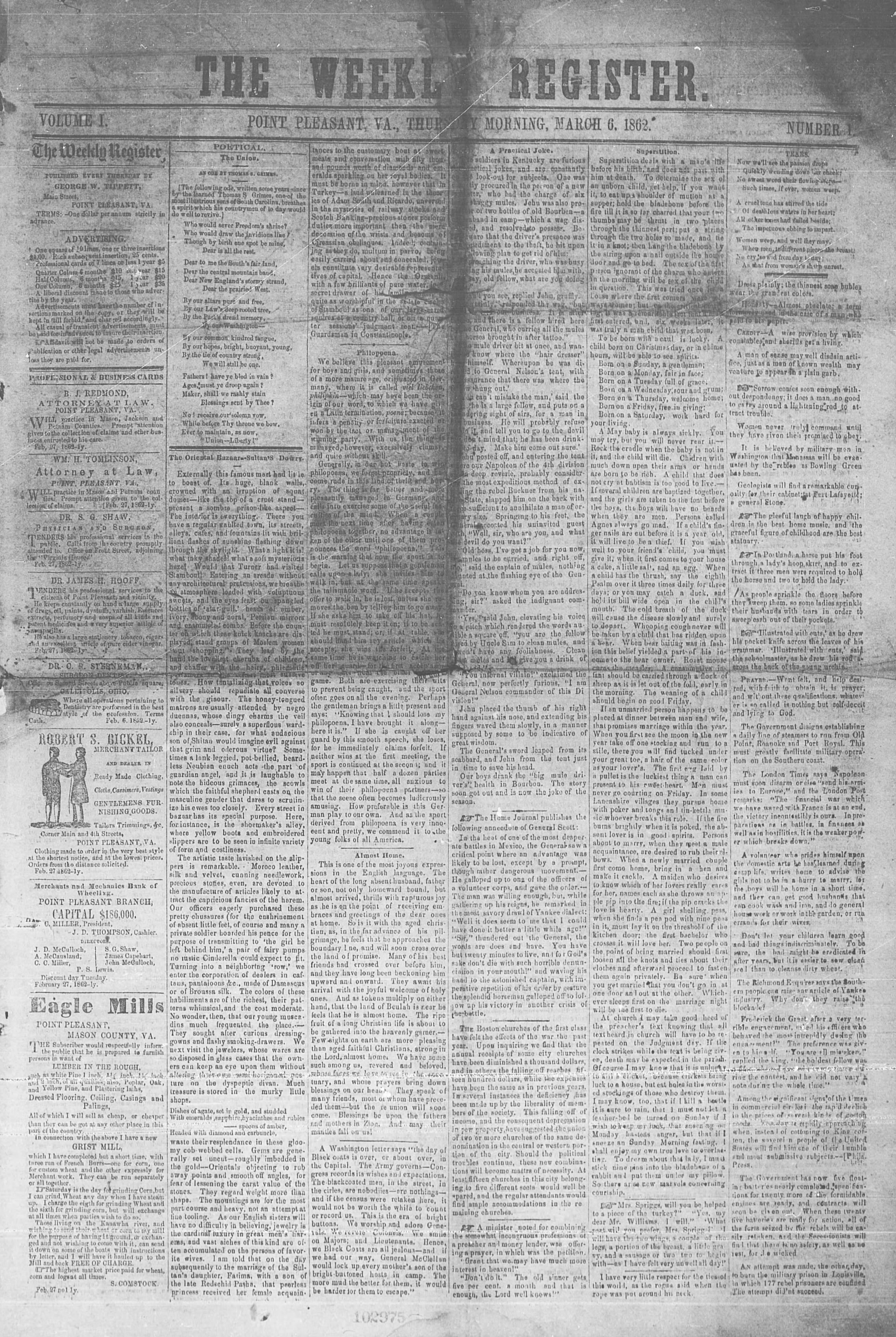
- The first page of the first issue of The Weekly Register of Point Pleasant, (West) Virginia.
- Type: weekly newspaper (1862–1916), daily newspaper (1895–1902, 1916–2022)
- Owner: AIM Media Midwest
- Founder: George W. Tippett
- Founded: March 6, 1862; 164 years ago
- Ceased publication: 2022
- Language: English
- City: Point Pleasant, West Virginia
- Country: United States
- Circulation: 2,216 (as of 2016)
- Website: mydailyregister.com

The Point Pleasant Register was a newspaper serving Point Pleasant and Mason County, West Virginia from 1862 to 2022. Circulation was limited to Mason County and nearby areas. The newspaper was founded by George W. Tippett as The Weekly Register in 1862, many years before becoming a daily publication, known as The Point Pleasant Register beginning in 1909.

== History ==
=== Precursors ===
Several ephemeral newspapers preceded the Register at Point Pleasant. The first of these was The West Virginian, published by Charles W. Hoy and William Peoples, beginning in 1845. This paper ceased publication after about a year, when Peoples moved the printing press to Gallipolis, Ohio. Another newspaper was published from 1852 to 1854, under the titles Weekly Bulletin and The Western Messenger, subsequently purchased by the United Brethren Publishing Company and continued as The Virginia Telescope until 1856, then The Virginia Messenger, published by D. S. Van Matre, proprietor of Slasher's Monthly, until 1857. The Independent Republican was published by James Hutchinson and Lewis Wetzel from 1854 to 1861, when mail delivery was halted early in the American Civil War, and its printing press and office equipment were sold.

=== Establishment ===
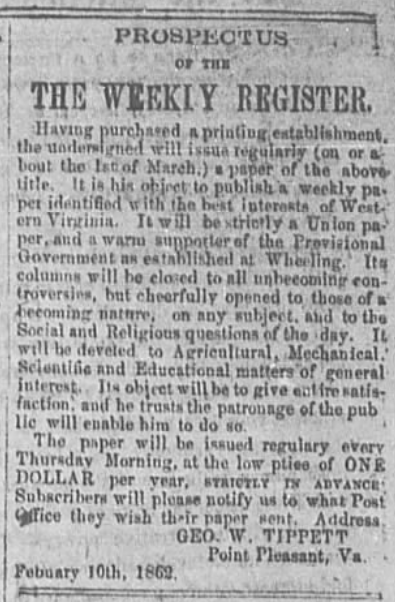
Declararation of the Register's original purpose.

On March 6, 1862, George Ways Tippett, who had been foreman of the Independent Republican, published the first issue of The Weekly Register, a weekly newspaper issued each Thursday. The Register was housed in a frame building on the lower end of Main Street in Point Pleasant, with subscriptions sold for $1 per year, to be paid in advance. Tippett served as owner and editor of the Register during the Civil War, selling it to W. D. Mansfield of Athens, Ohio in 1865. The following year, Mansfield sold the paper to E. M. Fitzgerald, formerly the city editor. With the help of J. A. Shearer, who succeeded Fitzgerald as city editor, Tippett repurchased the Register in 1867. The Register would prove to be an exception to the usual pattern of early West Virginia newspapers, most of which failed within a few years of their establishment.

=== Tippett era ===
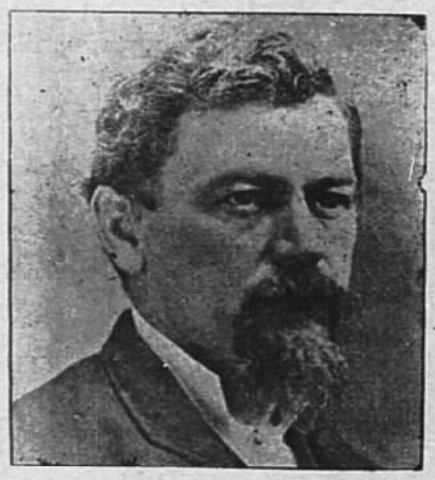
George W. Tippett, founder of the Weekly Register, c. 1900.

Tippett continued to publish and edit the paper each Thursday, through the end of the sixteenth volume on January 31, 1878. Beginning with the next issue, the Register was published on Wednesdays, with Tippett citing the need to go to press a day earlier in order to meet the mails. Interviewed for Hardesty's Biographical Atlas of Mason County, West Virginia (1882), Tippett stated that the Register had only missed six issues in its twenty-one years of publication. On January 18, 1895, The Weekly Register was joined by The Daily Register, a daily newspaper also published by Tippett, at the price of 25¢ per month.

George W. Tippett died May 19, 1902, aged sixty-six, forty years after beginning the Register. His death resulted in the suspension of The Daily Register on June 30, 1902, after nearly eight-and-a-half years of publication. His son, F. B. Tippett, succeeded him as editor until the Weekly Register's final issue, dated January 27, 1909. At this time the Register's business failed, and without warning the paper ceased publication for about two months.

=== Re-establishment ===
On April 6, 1909, the Register Publishing Company was incorporated with a capital investment of $25,000, having purchased the assets of The Weekly Register from J. S. Spencer on March 27. The new owners, none of whom had been connected with the previous version, announced their intention of publishing a weekly Democratic-leaning newspaper, at a time when all other papers in Mason County were Republican, under the title of The Point Pleasant Register. The company assumed responsibility for the Weekly Register's subscribers. W. C. Whaley, one of the new owners, was appointed general manager, with subscriptions at $1 per year, to be paid in advance.

By 1916, R. B. Bell succeeded as editor and general manager of the Register, which resumed daily publication, and operated on the second story of a hardware store on Fifth and Main Streets in Point Pleasant. The company re-incorporated on July 24, 1930, and moved into a brick building on Fifth Street. W. Cleveland Bowie served as editor from 1931 to 1941, when he was succeeded by Edward Swint, editor from 1941 to 1965. In 1951, the building housing the Register was badly damaged by fire, and the paper moved into a new location at the corner of Second and Main Streets.

Swint was followed as editor by J. Knox Dye, John Samsell, William J. Dempsey, and Robert Wingett. In 1969, the Register became part of the Ohio Valley Publishing Company, which merged with Multimedia, Inc. in 1977. Judy Morgan, previously the news editor, became the first female editor of the Point Pleasant Register in 1985.

=== Late period ===
By the 2010s, the newspaper was owned by Heartland Publications, an imprint of Ohio Community Media, which merged with Impressions Media to form Civitas Media in 2012. Civitas Media sold the Register to AIM Media Midwest in 2017. The Register continued to publish under its own name, following the schedule of publishing morning editions from Tuesday to Friday, and a "weekend" edition delivered at mid-day on Saturday. At this period, the Register primarily covered local events, with broader news coverage provided by the Huntington Herald-Dispatch and the Charleston Gazette-Mail, which circulated widely throughout the county. About 2022, the Register ceased to be published as a separate paper, being folded into the River Cities Tribune & Register, along with newspapers from Gallipolis and Pomeroy, Ohio.

== Archives ==
Various libraries preserve archives of The Weekly Register and Point Pleasant Register. Although incomplete, the West Virginia State Archives has issues of the Register on microfilm, from the first issue in 1862 to June 30, 2022. Some of the Register's archives can be viewed over the internet: a commercial website, Newspapers.com, has some, but not all extant issues of The Weekly Register from 1862 to 1909, and The Point Pleasant Register from 1909 and 1910. The Google News Archive has issues from 1986 to 1997, 1999 to 2002, and 2004.
