= Condee, West Virginia =

Unincorporated community in West Virginia, United States

Condee
- Unincorporated community
- Location within the state of West Virginia Condee (the United States)
- Coordinates: 38°42′45″N 82°1′20″W
- Country: United States
- State: West Virginia
- County: Mason
- Elevation: 676 ft (206 m)
- Time zone: UTC-5 (Eastern (EST))
  - Summer (DST): UTC-4 (EDT)
- GNIS ID: 1560162

Condee was an unincorporated community in Mason County, West Virginia, United States.
