= Arlee, West Virginia =

Unincorporated community in West Virginia, United States

Arlee
- Unincorporated community
- Location within the state of West Virginia Arlee (the United States)
- Coordinates: 38°43′57″N 82°5′41″W
- Country: United States
- State: West Virginia
- County: Mason
- Elevation: 650 ft (200 m)
- Time zone: UTC-5 (Eastern (EST))
  - Summer (DST): UTC-4 (EDT)
- GNIS ID: 1535005

Arlee is an unincorporated community in Mason County, West Virginia, United States.
