= Robert C. Byrd Lock and Dam =

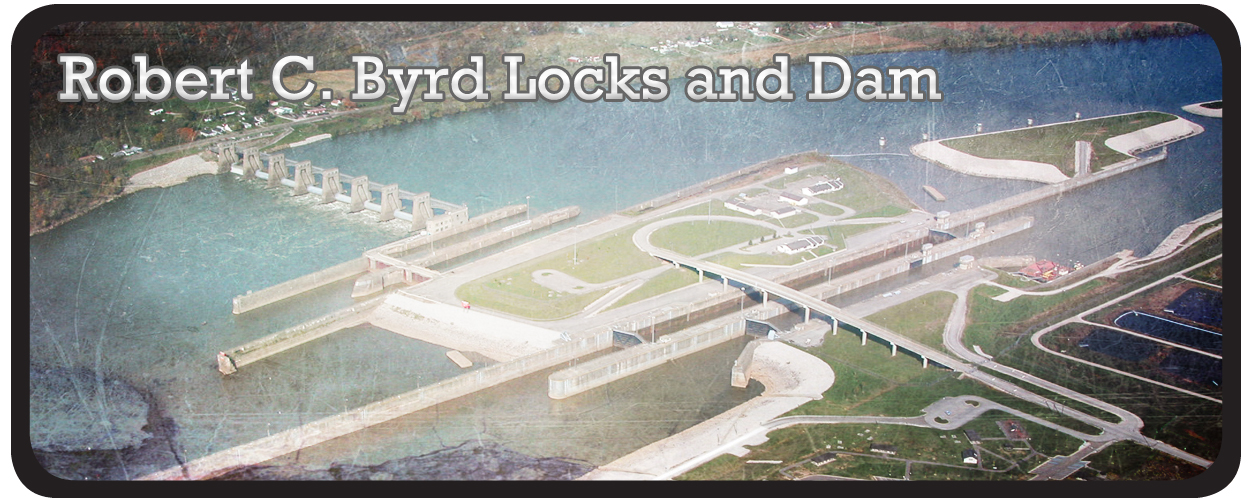
- Official name: Robert C. Byrd Lock and Dam
- Location: Ohio/West Virginia border
- Coordinates: 38.6816°N 82.1900°W
- Construction began: August 25, 1937
- Opening date: October 1937
- Construction cost: Lock Replacement $244,550,000; Dam Rehabilitation $46,700,000
- Operator: United States Army Corps of Engineers Huntington District

Dam and spillways
- Type of dam: 8 Roller gates
- Impounds: Ohio River
- Length: 1,132 feet

Reservoir
- Normal elevation: 538 feet above sealevel

The Robert C. Byrd Lock and Dam, formerly the Gallipolis Lock and Dam, is the 10th lock and dam on the Ohio River, located 280 miles downstream from Pittsburgh. There are 4 locks: one for commercial barge traffic, 1,200 feet long by 110 feet wide; the auxiliary lock is 600 feet long by 110 feet wide; and there are 2 smaller parallel locks.

== See also ==
- List of locks and dams of the Ohio River
- List of locks and dams of the Upper Mississippi River
