= Minor civil division =

Governmental divisions of U.S. counties, such as civil townships

A minor civil division (MCD) is a term used by the United States Census Bureau for primary governmental and/or administrative divisions of a county or county-equivalent. MCDs are used for statistical purposes by the Census Bureau, and do not necessarily represent the primary form of local government. They range from non-governing geographical survey areas to municipalities with weak or strong powers of self-government. Some states with large unincorporated areas give substantial powers to counties; others have smaller or larger incorporated entities with governmental powers that are smaller than the MCD level chosen by the Census.

As of 2010, MCDs exist in 29 states, the District of Columbia, and Puerto Rico. In all other states where state-defined entities are not used for census purposes (mostly in the South and the West), the Census Bureau designates Census County Divisions (CCDs). For several decennial censuses prior to the 2010 census, 28 states used MCDs, but in 2008, Tennessee changed from CCDs to MCDs, bringing the total number of MCD states to 29.

In states that use MCDs, when any land or water is not covered by a state-defined MCD, the Census Bureau creates additional entities as unorganized territories, that it treats as equivalent to MCDs for statistical purposes. Because MCDs are used to divide up counties, when a MCD-level municipality or unallocated territory or water spans county boundaries, that entity's boundaries are used to create multiple MCDs, one for each county. For water areas unallocated to any MCD, the Census Bureau assigns a default FIPS county subdivision code of 00000 and an ANSI code of eight zeroes. This typically happens when state and county boundaries extend into the ocean or Great Lakes, but MCDs are not defined by the state for the unoccupied water.

== Minor civil divisions by state and territory ==
- American Samoa - counties are treated as MCDs; districts and atolls are treated as county equivalents.
- Arkansas - townships (non-governing), one unorganized territory (Fort Chaffee)
- Connecticut - towns and consolidated city-towns, unorganized water in Long Island Sound. Groton is the only city not consolidated with a town. Naugatuck is the only borough coterminous with a town.
- District of Columbia - considered an undivided equivalent of state, county, and MCD.
- Guam - villages (technically election districts, but these are currently all co-terminous). Some reports treat villages as county equivalents.
- Illinois - townships in 85 counties, election precincts in 17 counties, unorganized water in Lake Michigan. Chicago spans two counties and is thus two separate MCDs.
- Indiana - townships, one unorganized territory (Camp Atterbury), unorganized water in Lake Michigan
- Iowa - townships, cities, one unorganized water area (reservoir in Polk County). The city of Tabor spans two counties and constitutes two MCDs.
- Kansas - cities, townships (some non-governing)
- Louisiana - parish governing authority districts (non-governing, used for elections), one city (New Orleans)
- Maine - cities, towns, plantation, American Indian reservations, unorganized territories (including one gore)
- Maryland - county election districts, one city (Baltimore)
- Massachusetts - cities, towns, unorganized water
- Michigan - townships, cities, unorganized water
- Minnesota - townships (mostly governing), cities, unorganized territories, unorganized water
- Mississippi - supervisors' districts (five per county, only used for electing county officials)
- Missouri - townships (mostly non-governing), one city (St. Louis)
- Nebraska - townships (27 counties, mostly governing), election precincts (65 counties), election districts (Webster County), cities, villages
- New Hampshire - cities, towns, unincorporated townships (some of which are known as grants, locations, or purchases), unorganized water
- New Jersey - cities, towns, boroughs, villages, townships (governing), unorganized water
- New York - cities, towns, American Indian reservations, unorganized territory, unorganized water. Each of the boroughs of New York City is a county. The city of Geneva also spans county boundaries; the only part in Seneca County is water.
- North Carolina - townships (non-governing), one city (Asheville), four unorganized territories, and Cleveland County is undivided after abolishing townships
- North Dakota - townships (mostly governing), cities, unorganized territories
- Northern Mariana Islands - municipal districts; municipalities are treated as county equivalents
- Ohio - townships, cities, villages
- Pennsylvania - townships (governing except for Cold Spring Township), boroughs, cities, 3 municipalities, 1 town, and 1 area of unorganized water
- Puerto Rico - barrios and barrios-pueblo, unorganized water
- Rhode Island - towns, cities, unorganized water
- South Dakota - cities, townships, unorganized territories
- Tennessee - county commissioner districts (non-governing)
- US Virgin Islands - subdistricts (created by the territorial government explicitly for census purposes)
- Vermont - cities, towns (governing except 5 unincorporated), and four gores (one of which is known as Warner's Grant)
- Virginia - independent cities (each of which is also a county equivalent), districts (used for election of county supervisors, known as magisterial districts or election districts); Arlington County is a single MCD
- West Virginia - magisterial districts (used to elect county commissioners and school board members)
- Wisconsin - towns (mostly governing, consolidated with county in Menominee County), cities, villages, unorganized water

The United States also performs a census for the Republic of Palau, which has an agreement of free association. The U.S. Census considers all of Palau a county equivalent, and uses its states (formerly known as municipalities) as MCDs.
